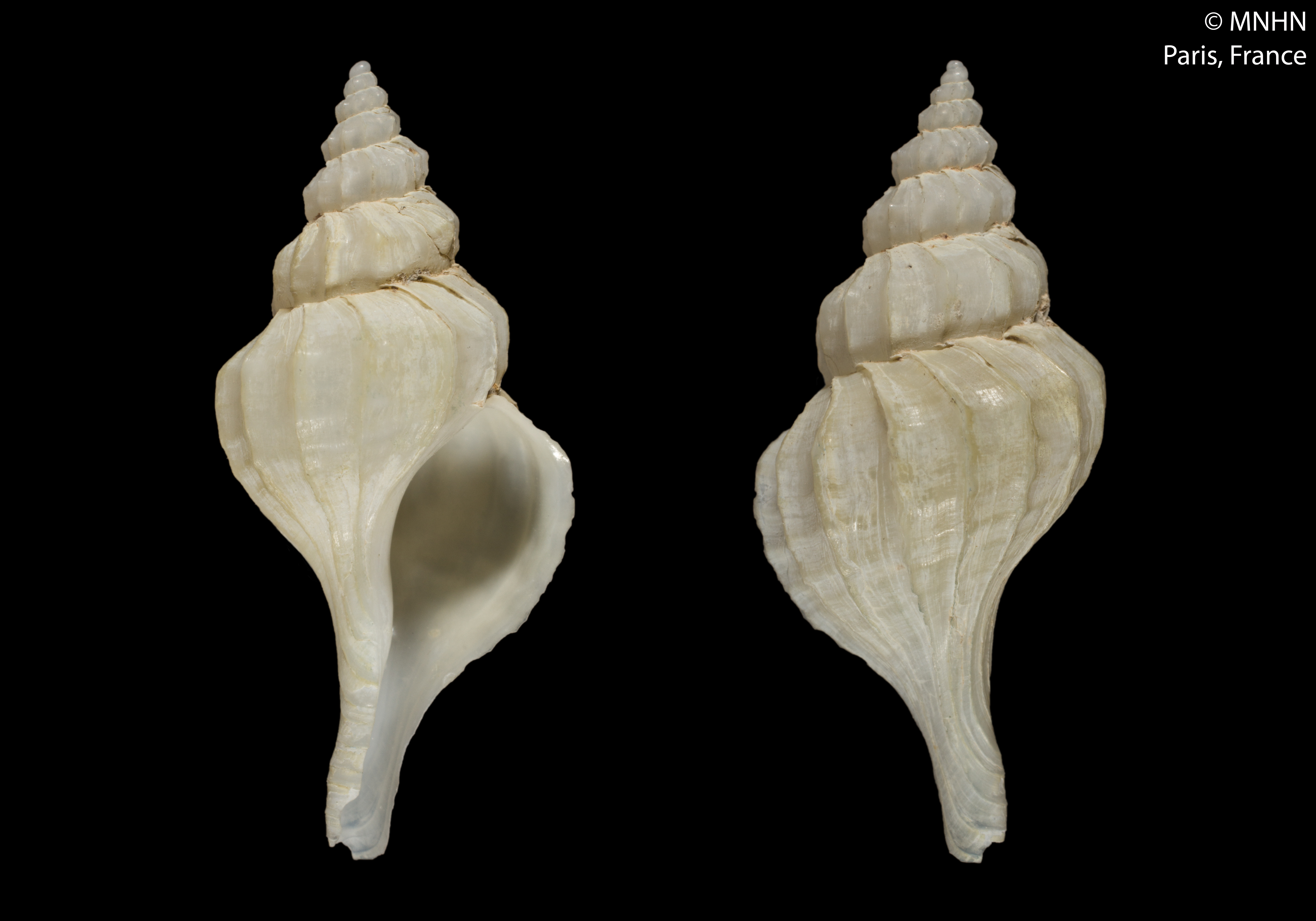
- Pagodula mucrone

Scientific classification
- Kingdom: Animalia
- Phylum: Mollusca
- Class: Gastropoda
- Subclass: Caenogastropoda
- Order: Neogastropoda
- Family: Muricidae
- Subfamily: Pagodulinae
- Genus: Pagodula; Monterosato, 1884

Type species
- Fusus echinatus Kiener, 1840

Synonyms
- Trophon (Enixotrophon); Enixotrophon Iredale, 1929; Pinon de Gregorio, 1885; Poirieria (Pagodula)

= Pagodula =

Genus of gastropods

Pagodula is a genus of sea snails, marine gastropod mollusks in the subfamily Pagodulinae of the family Muricidae, the murex snails or rock snails.

== Species ==
Species within the genus Pagodula include:

- Pagodula abyssorum (Verrill, 1885)
- Pagodula aculeata (Watson, 1882)
- † Pagodula carinata (Bivona, 1832)
- Pagodula cossmanni (Locard, 1897)
- Pagodula diaphana Garrigues & Lamy, 2018
- Pagodula echinata (Kiener, 1840)
- Pagodula fraseri (Knudsen, 1956)
- Pagodula golikovi (Egorov, 1992)
- Pagodula guineensis (Thiele, 1925)
- Pagodula lacunella (Dall, 1889)
- Pagodula limicola Verrill, 1885
- Pagodula mucrone (Houart, 1991)
- Pagodula obtuselirata (Schepman), 1911)
- Pagodula pagoda Garrigues & Lamy, 2018
- Pagodula parechinata Houart, 2001
- † Pagodula vaginata (de Cristofori & Jan, 1832)
- † Pagodula vegrandis P. Marshall & Murdoch, 1923
- Pagodula verrillii (Bush, 1893)

Species brought into synonymy

- Pagodula acceptans (Barnard, 1959): synonym of Enixotrophon acceptans (Barnard, 1959)
- Pagodula araios (Houart & Engl, 2007): synonym of Enixotrophon araios (Houart & Engl, 2007)
- Pagodula arnaudi (Pastorino, 2002): synonym of Enixotrophon arnaudi (Pastorino, 2002)
- Pagodula atanua Houart & Tröndlé, 2008: synonym of Enixotrophon atanua (Houart & Tröndle, 2008)
- Pagodula carduelis (Watson, 1882): synonym of Enixotrophon carduelis (R. B. Watson, 1882)
- Pagodula carinata (Bivona, 1832) sensu Monterosato, 1884: synonym of Pagodula echinata (Kiener, 1840)
- Pagodula ceciliae (Houart, 2003): synonym of Enixotrophon ceciliae (Houart, 2003)
- Pagodula columbarioides (Pastorino & Scarabino, 2008): synonym of Enixotrophon columbarioides (Pastorino & Scarabino, 2008)
- Pagodula concepcionensis (Houart & Sellanes, 2006): synonym of Enixotrophon concepcionensis (Houart & Sellanes, 2006)
- Pagodula condei (Houart, 2003): synonym of Enixotrophon condei (Houart, 2003)
- Pagodula declinans (Watson, 1882): synonym of Enixotrophon declinans (R. B. Watson, 1882)
- † Pagodula delli (Beu, 1967): synonym of † Enixotrophon delli (Beu, 1967)
- Pagodula eos B.A. Marshall & Houart, 2011: synonym of Enixotrophon eos (B. A. Marshall & Houart, 2011)
- Pagodula eumorpha B.A. Marshall & Houart, 2011: synonym of Enixotrophon eumorphus (B. A. Marshall & Houart, 2011)
- Pagodula hastula B.A. Marshall & Houart, 2011: synonym of Enixotrophon hastulus (B. A. Marshall & Houart, 2011)
- Pagodula kosunorum Houart & Lan, 2003: synonym of Enixotrophon kosunorum (Houart & Lan, 2003)
- Pagodula lata B.A. Marshall & Houart, 2011: synonym of Enixotrophon latus (B. A. Marshall & Houart, 2011)
- Pagodula lochi B.A. Marshall & Houart, 2011: synonym of Enixotrophon lochi (B. A. Marshall & Houart, 2011)
- Pagodula macquariensis (Powell, 1957): synonym of Enixotrophon macquariensis (Powell, 1957)
- Pagodula maxwelli B.A. Marshall & Houart, 2011: synonym of Enixotrophon maxwelli (B. A. Marshall & Houart, 2011)
- Pagodula multigrada (Houart, 1990): synonym of Enixotrophon multigradus (Houart, 1990)
- Pagodula obtusa B.A. Marshall & Houart, 2011: synonym of Enixotrophon obtusus (B. A. Marshall & Houart, 2011)
- Pagodula occidua B.A. Marshall & Houart, 2011: synonym of Enixotrophon occiduus (B. A. Marshall & Houart, 2011)
- Pagodula planispina (Smith, 1892): synonym of Enixotrophon planispinus (E. A. Smith, 1906)
- Pagodula plicilaminata (Verco, 1909): synonym of Enixotrophon plicilaminatus (Verco, 1909)
- Pagodula poirieria (Powell, 1951): synonym of Enixotrophon poirieria (Powell, 1951)
- Pagodula procera Houart, 2001: synonym of Enixotrophon procerus (Houart, 2001)
- Pagodula pulchella (Schepman, 1911): synonym of Enixotrophon pulchellus (Schepman, 1911)
- Pagodula pygmaea B.A. Marshall & Houart, 2011: synonym of Enixotrophon pygmaeus (B. A. Marshall & Houart, 2011)
- Pagodula sansibarica (Thiele, 1925): synonym of Enixotrophon sansibaricus (Thiele, 1925)
- Pagodula siberutensis (Thiele, 1925): synonym of Enixotrophon siberutensis (Thiele, 1925)
- Pagodula tangaroa B.A. Marshall & Houart, 2011: synonym of Enixotrophon tangaroa (B. A. Marshall & Houart, 2011)
- Pagodula tenuirostrata (Smith, 1899): synonym of Enixotrophon tenuirostratus (E. A. Smith, 1899)
- Pagodula venusta B.A. Marshall & Houart, 2011: synonym of Enixotrophon venustus (B. A. Marshall & Houart, 2011)
- Pagodula veronicae (Pastorino, 1999): synonym of Enixotrophon veronicae (Pastorino, 1999)
- Pagodula ziczac (Tiba, 1981): synonym of Enixotrophon ziczac (Tiba, 1981)
