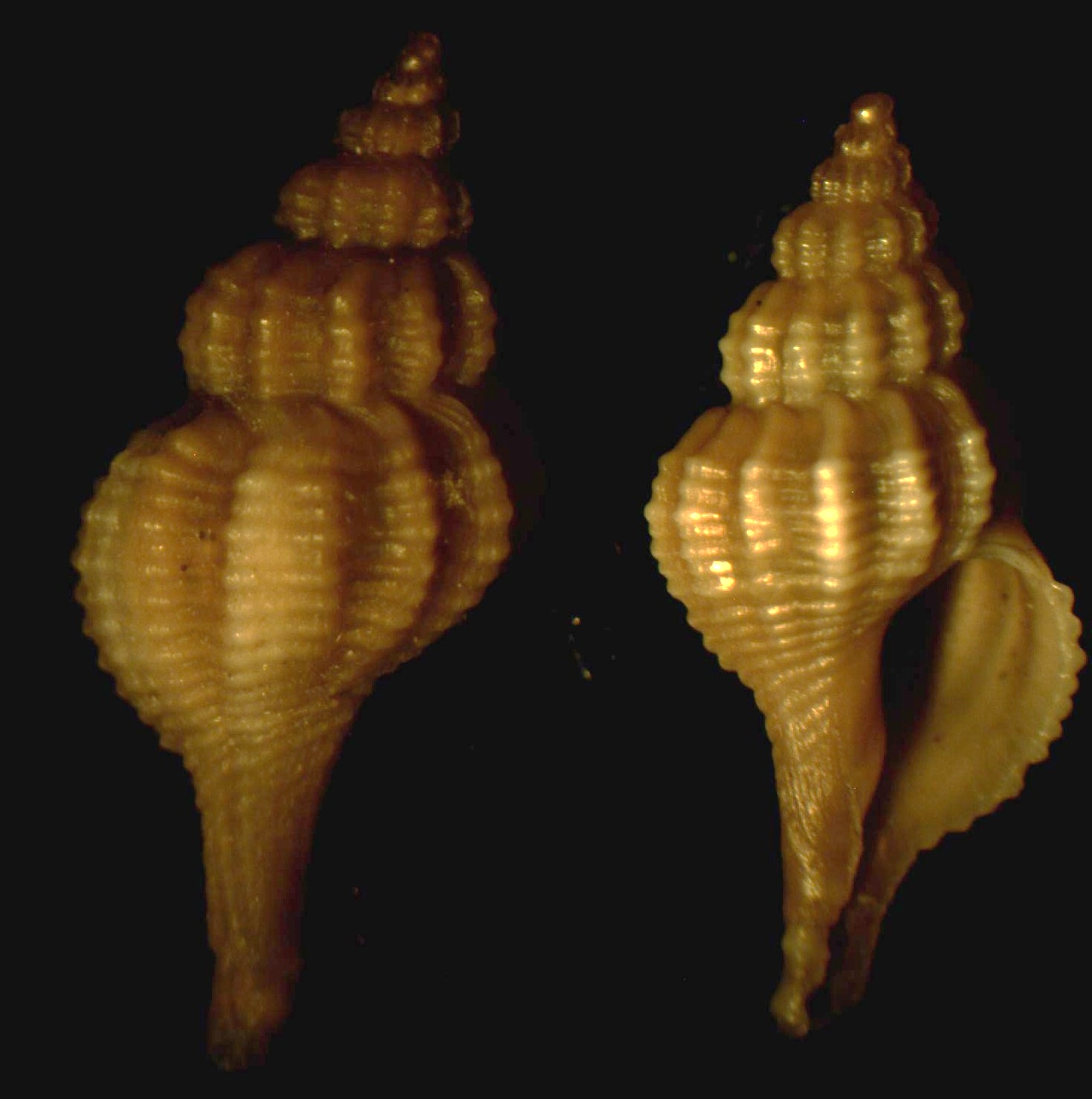
- Trophonopsis muricata

Scientific classification
- Kingdom: Animalia
- Phylum: Mollusca
- Class: Gastropoda
- Subclass: Caenogastropoda
- Order: Neogastropoda
- Superfamily: Muricoidea
- Family: Muricidae
- Subfamily: Pagodulinae
- Genus: Trophonopsis; Bucquoy, Dautzenberg & Dollfus, 1882

Type species
- Murex muricatus Montagu, 1803

Synonyms
- Chalmon de Gregorio, 1885; Houartiella Smriglio, Mariottini & Bonfitto, 1997; Neptunea (Trophonopsis); Trophon (Trophonopsis)

= Trophonopsis =

Genus of gastropods

Trophonopsis is a genus of sea snails, marine gastropod mollusks in the family Muricidae, the murex snails or rock snails.

== Species ==
Species within the genus Trophonopsis include:

- Trophonopsis aberrans (Houart, 1991)
- † Trophonopsis acharya (Yokoyama, 1926)
- Trophonopsis alboranensis (Smriglio, Mariottini & Bonfitto 1997)
- v Trophonopsis aulacophora (Cossmann, 1913)
- Trophonopsis barvicensis (Johnston, 1825)
- † Trophonopsis bonneti (Cossmann, 1913)
- Trophonopsis breviata (Jeffreys, 1882)
- † Trophonopsis cuisensis (Cossmann, 1913)
- Trophonopsis densilamellata Golikov & Gulbin, 1977: synonym of Scabrotrophon densilamellatus (Golikov & Gulbin, 1977) (original combination)
- Trophonopsis diazi (Durham, 1942)
- Trophonopsis droueti (Dautzenberg, 1889)
- Trophonopsis kayae Habe, 1981
- Trophonopsis mioplectos (Barnard, 1959)
- Trophonopsis muricata (Montagu, 1803)
- † Trophonopsis multistriata (Deshayes, 1865)
- Trophonopsis orpheus (Gould, 1849)
- Trophonopsis pistillum (Barnard, 1959)
- Trophonopsis polycyma Kuroda, 1953
- Trophonopsis sparacioi Smriglio, Mariottini & Di Giulio, 2015
- † Trophonopsis squamulata (Brocchi, 1814)
- † Trophonopsis sublamellosa (Deshayes, 1835)

Species brought into synonymy

- Subgenus Trophonopsis (Austrotrophon) Dall, 1902: synonym of Austrotrophon Dall, 1902
- Subgenus Trophonopsis (Boreotrophon) P. Fischer, 1884: synonym of Boreotrophon P. Fischer, 1884
- Trophonopsis apolyonis (Dall, 1919): synonym of Boreotrophon apolyonis (Dall, 1919)
- Trophonopsis bassetti Houart, 1998: synonym of Enatimene bassetti (Houart, 1998)
- Trophonopsis carduelis (Watson, 1882): synonym of Pagodula carduelis (Watson, 1882)
- † Trophonopsis carinata (Bivona, 1832): synonym of † Pagodula carinata (Bivona, 1832)
- † Trophonopsis carinatus: synonym of † Pagodula carinata (Bivona, 1832)
- Trophonopsis clathratus (Linnaeus, 1767): synonym of Boreotrophon clathratus (Linnaeus, 1767)
- Trophonopsis clavatus Sars, GO, 1879 synonym of Boreotrophon clavatus (Sars, 1878)
- Trophonopsis crystallinus Kuroda, 1953: synonym of Abyssotrophon crystallinus (Kuroda, 1953)
- Trophonopsis curta Locard, 1892: synonym of Trophonopsis muricata (Montagu, 1803)
- Trophonopsis delicatus Kuroda, 1953: synonym of Abyssotrophon delicatus (Kuroda, 1953)
- Trophonopsis densicostata Golikov in Golikov & Scarlato, 1985: synonym of Scabrotrophon densicostatus (Golikov in Golikov & Scarlato, 1985)
- Trophonopsis densilamellata Golikov & Gulbin, 1977: synonym of Scabrotrophon densilamellatus (Golikov & Gulbin, 1977) (original combination)
- Trophonopsis fabricii Beck in Møller, 1842: synonym of Scabrotrophon fabricii (Møller, 1842)
- Trophonopsis fasciolarioides (Pastorino & Scarabino, 2008): synonym of Enixotrophon fasciolarioides (Pastorino & Scarabino, 2008)
- Trophonopsis forestii Ruggieri, 1947: synonym of Trophonopsis muricata (Montagu, 1803)
- Trophonopsis gortani Ruggieri, 1947: synonym of Trophonopsis muricata (Montagu, 1803)
- Trophonopsis gruveli Dautzenberg, 1910: synonym of Vaughtia gruveli (Dautzenberg, 1910) (original combination)
- Trophonopsis hubbsi Rokop, 1972: synonym of Abyssotrophon hubbsi ^{(Rokop, 1972)}
- Trophonopsis kamchatkanus (Dall, 1902): synonym of Scabrotrophon kamchatkanus (Dall, 1902)
- Trophonopsis keepi (Strong & Hertlein, 1937): synonym of Boreotrophon pedroanus (Arnold, 1903)
- Trophonopsis lasius (Dall, 1919): synonym of Scabrotrophon lasius (Dall, 1919)
- Trophonopsis longurio Bucquoy & Dautzenberg, 1882: synonym of Trophonopsis muricata (Montagu, 1803)
- Trophonopsis magnifica Golikov & Sirenko, 1992: synonym of Nipponotrophon magnificus (Golikov & Sirenko, 1992)
- Trophonopsis minirotunda (Houart, 1986): synonym of Leptotrophon minirotundus (Houart, 1986)
- Trophonopsis multigradus (Houart, 1990): synonym of Pagodula multigrada (Houart, 1990)
- Trophonopsis nana Egorov, 1994: synonym of Boreotrophon kamchatkanus Dall, 1902
- Trophonopsis nodulosa Golikov, 1985: synonym of Scabrotrophon nodulosus (Golikov, in Golikov & Scarlato, 1985)
- Trophonopsis obtuseliratus (Schepman, 1911): synonym of Enixotrophon obtuseliratus (Schepman, 1911)
- Trophonopsis odisseyi Golikov & Sirenko, 1992: synonym of Abyssotrophon odisseyi (Golikov & Sirenko, 1992)
- Trophonopsis plicilaminatus (Verco, 1909): synonym of Pagodula plicilaminata (Verco, 1909)
- Trophonopsis scarlatoi Golikov & Sirenko, 1992: synonym of Scabrotrophon scarlatoi (Golikov & Sirenko, 1992)
- Trophonopsis segmentata (Verco, 1909): synonym of Leptotrophon segmentatus (Verco, 1909)
- Trophonopsis shingoi Tiba, 1981: synonym of Nipponotrophon shingoi (Tiba, 1981)
- Trophonopsis similidroueti (Houart, 1989): synonym of Enixotrophon similidroueti (Houart, 1989)
- Trophonopsis soyoae Okutani, 1959: synonym of Abyssotrophon soyoae (Okutani, 1959)
- Trophonopsis stuarti (E. A. Smith, 1880): synonym of Nipponotrophon stuarti (E. A. Smith, 1880)
- Trophonopsis tegularis Golikov & Gulbin, 1977: synonym of Scabrotrophon tegularis (Golikov & Gulbin, 1977)
- Trophonopsis tolomius (Dall, 1919): synonym of Boreotrophon tolomius (Dall, 1919)
- Trophonopsis tripherus (Dall, 1902): synonym of Boreotrophon tripherus Dall, 1902
- Trophonopsis truncata (Strom, 1768): synonym of Boreotrophon truncatus (Ström, 1768)
- Trophonopsis undocostata Golikov & Sirenko, 1992: synonym of Scabrotrophon undocostatus (Golikov & Sirenko, 1992)
- † Trophonopsis varicosissimus (Michelotti, 1841): synonym of † Pagodula carinata (Bivona, 1832)
- Trophonopsis yurii Egorov, 1994: synonym of Scabrotrophon yurii (Egorov, 1994)
- Trophonopsis ziczac Tiba, 1981: synonym of Pagodula ziczac (Tiba, 1981)
