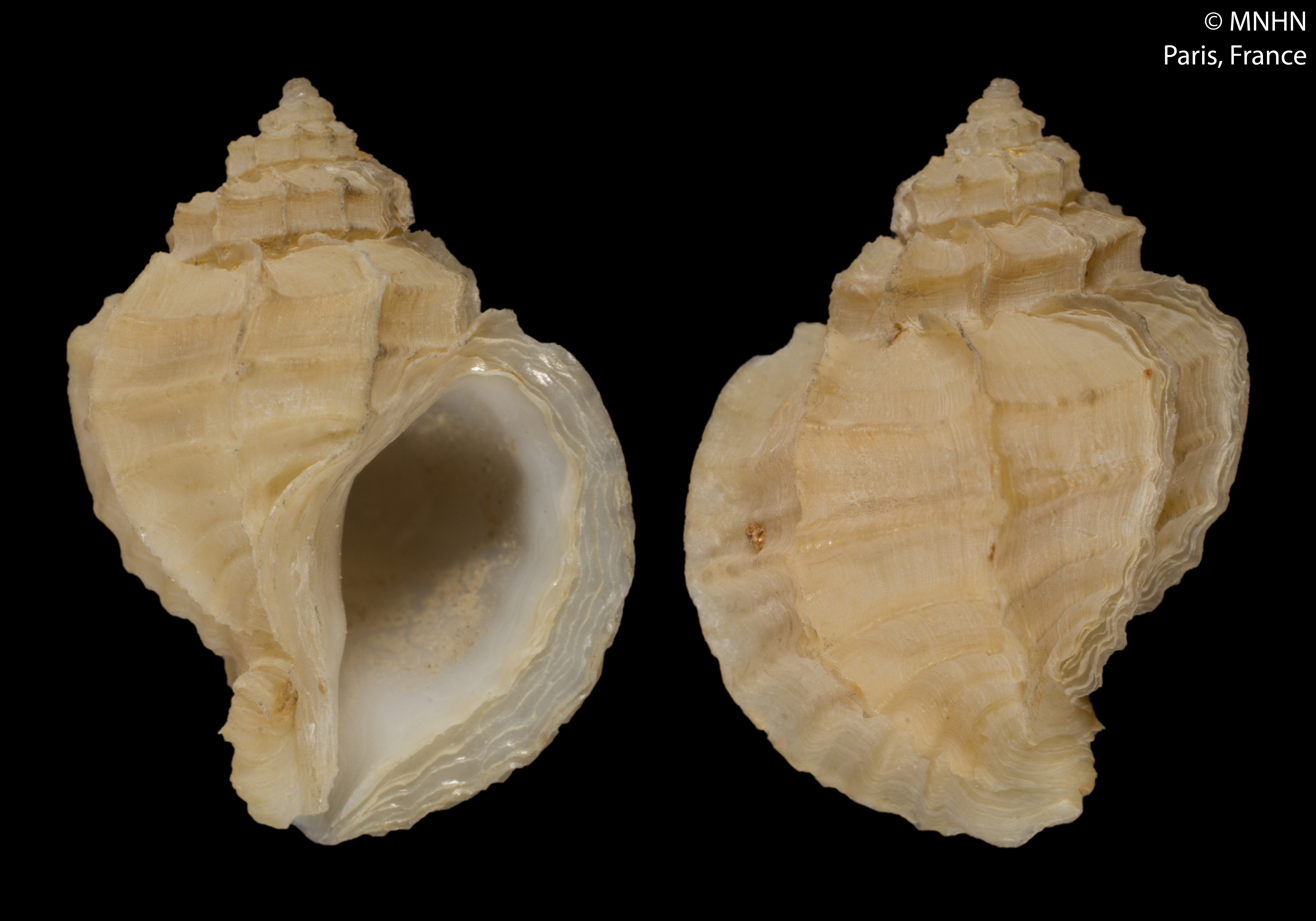
- Shell of Trophonopsis droueti (holotype at MNHN, Paris)

Scientific classification
- Kingdom: Animalia
- Phylum: Mollusca
- Class: Gastropoda
- Subclass: Caenogastropoda
- Order: Neogastropoda
- Family: Muricidae
- Subfamily: Pagodulinae
- Genus: Trophonopsis
- Species: T. droueti

Binomial name
- Trophonopsis droueti (Dautzenberg, 1889)

Synonyms
- Trophon droueti Dautzenberg, 1889; Trophon richardi Dautzenberg & Fischer, 1896; Trophonopsis droueti var. elongata Locard, 1897

= Trophonopsis droueti =

Species of gastropod

Trophonopsis droueti is a species of sea snail, a marine gastropod mollusk in the family Muricidae, the murex snails or rock snails.

== Distribution ==
This marine species occurs in European waters.
