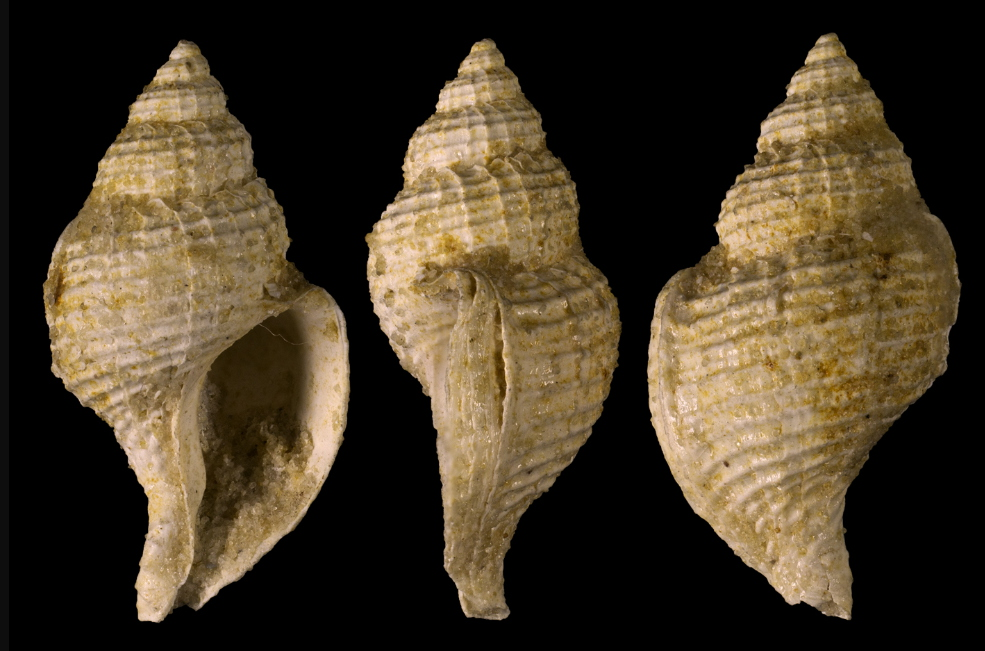
- Shell of Trophonopsis sublamellosa (specimen at MNHN, Paris)

Scientific classification
- Kingdom: Animalia
- Phylum: Mollusca
- Class: Gastropoda
- Subclass: Caenogastropoda
- Order: Neogastropoda
- Family: Muricidae
- Subfamily: Pagodulinae
- Genus: Trophonopsis
- Species: T. sublamellosa

Binomial name
- Trophonopsis sublamellosa (Deshayes, 1835)

Synonyms
- † Fusus sublamellosus Deshayes, 1834 superseded combination; † Urosalpinx defossum (Pilkington, 1804)

= Trophonopsis sublamellosa =

Species of gastropod

Trophonopsis sublamellosa is an extinct species of sea snail, a marine gastropod mollusk in the family Muricidae, the murex snails or rock snails.

== Distribution ==
Fossils were found in Eocene strata of Paris Basin, France.

== Bibliography ==
- Cossmann (M.) & Pissarro (G.), 1911 - Iconographie complète des coquilles fossiles de l'Éocène des environs de Paris, t. 2, p. pl. 26–45
- Le Renard, J. & Pacaud, J. (1995). Révision des mollusques Paléogènes du Bassin de Paris. II. Liste des références primaires des espèces. Cossmanniana. 3: 65–132.
