= Trophonopsis orpheus =

Scientific classification
- Kingdom: Animalia
- Phylum: Mollusca
- Class: Gastropoda
- Subclass: Caenogastropoda
- Order: Neogastropoda
- Family: Muricidae
- Subfamily: Pagodulinae
- Genus: Trophonopsis
- Species: T. orpheus

Binomial name
- Trophonopsis orpheus (Gould, 1849)

Synonyms
- Boreotrophon orpheus (Gould, 1849); Fusus orpheus Gould, 1849 (original combination)

Species of gastropod

Trophonopsis orpheus is a species of sea snail, a marine gastropod mollusk in the family Muricidae, the murex snails or rock snails.
