= Trophonopsis alboranensis =

Scientific classification
- Kingdom: Animalia
- Phylum: Mollusca
- Class: Gastropoda
- Subclass: Caenogastropoda
- Order: Neogastropoda
- Family: Muricidae
- Subfamily: Pagodulinae
- Genus: Trophonopsis
- Species: T. alboranensi

Binomial name
- Trophonopsis alboranensi (Smriglio, Mariottini & Bonfitto 1997)

Synonyms
- Houartiella alboranensis Smriglio, Mariottini & Bonfitto, 1997

Species of gastropod

Trophonopsis alboranensis is a species of sea snail, a marine gastropod mollusk in the family Muricidae, the murex snails or rock snails.

== Distribution ==
This marine species occurs in European waters.
