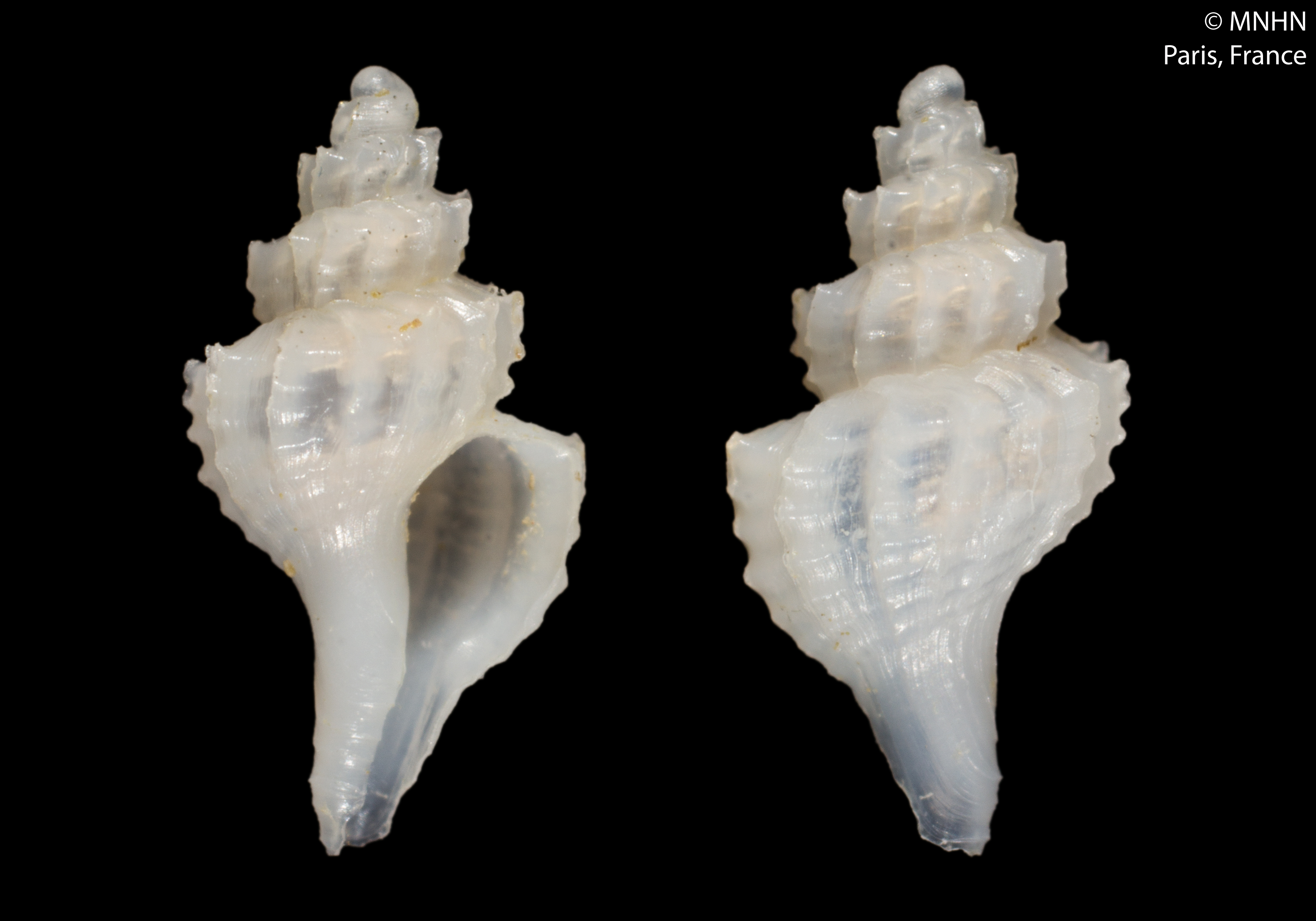
- Shell of Trophonopsis sparacioi (holotype at MNHN, Paris)

Scientific classification
- Kingdom: Animalia
- Phylum: Mollusca
- Class: Gastropoda
- Subclass: Caenogastropoda
- Order: Neogastropoda
- Family: Muricidae
- Subfamily: Pagodulinae
- Genus: Trophonopsis
- Species: T. sparacioi

Binomial name
- Trophonopsis sparacioi Smriglio, Mariottini & Di Giulio, 2015

= Trophonopsis sparacioi =

Species of gastropod

Trophonopsis sparacioi is a species of sea snail, a marine gastropod mollusk, in the family Muricidae, the murex snails or rock snails.

== Description ==
The length of the shell attains 5.6 mm.

== Distribution ==
This species occurs in Tyrrhenian Sea at depths between 500 m and 600 m.
