= Trophonopsis kayae =

Scientific classification
- Kingdom: Animalia
- Phylum: Mollusca
- Class: Gastropoda
- Subclass: Caenogastropoda
- Order: Neogastropoda
- Family: Muricidae
- Subfamily: Pagodulinae
- Genus: Trophonopsis
- Species: T. kayae

Binomial name
- Trophonopsis kayae Habe, 1981

Species of gastropod

Trophonopsis kayae is a species of sea snail, a marine gastropod mollusk in the family Muricidae, the murex snails or rock snails.
