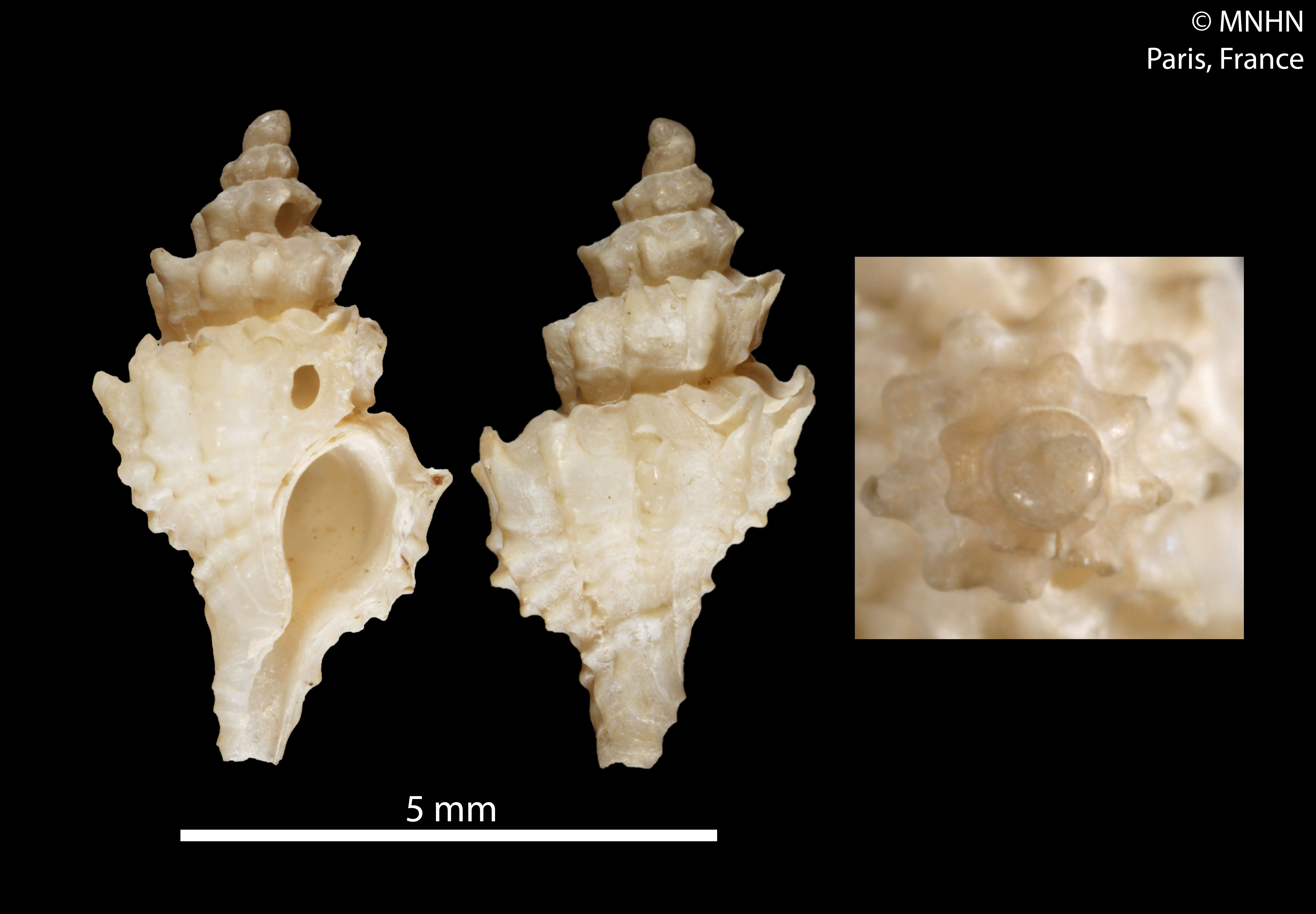
- Shell of Trophonopsis aberrans (paratype at MNHN, Paris)

Scientific classification
- Kingdom: Animalia
- Phylum: Mollusca
- Class: Gastropoda
- Subclass: Caenogastropoda
- Order: Neogastropoda
- Family: Muricidae
- Subfamily: Pagodulinae
- Genus: Trophonopsis
- Species: T. aberrans

Binomial name
- Trophonopsis aberrans (Houart, 1991)

Synonyms
- Trophon aberrans Houart, 1991

= Trophonopsis aberrans =

Species of gastropod

Trophonopsis aberrans is a species of sea snail, a marine gastropod mollusk in the family Muricidae, the murex snails or rock snails.
