= Trophonopsis pistillum =

Scientific classification
- Kingdom: Animalia
- Phylum: Mollusca
- Class: Gastropoda
- Subclass: Caenogastropoda
- Order: Neogastropoda
- Family: Muricidae
- Subfamily: Pagodulinae
- Genus: Trophonopsis
- Species: T. pistillum

Binomial name
- Trophonopsis pistillum (Barnard, 1959)

Synonyms
- Trophon pistillum Barnard, 1959

Species of gastropod

Trophonopsis pistillum is a species of sea snail, a marine gastropod mollusk in the family Muricidae, the murex snails or rock snails.
