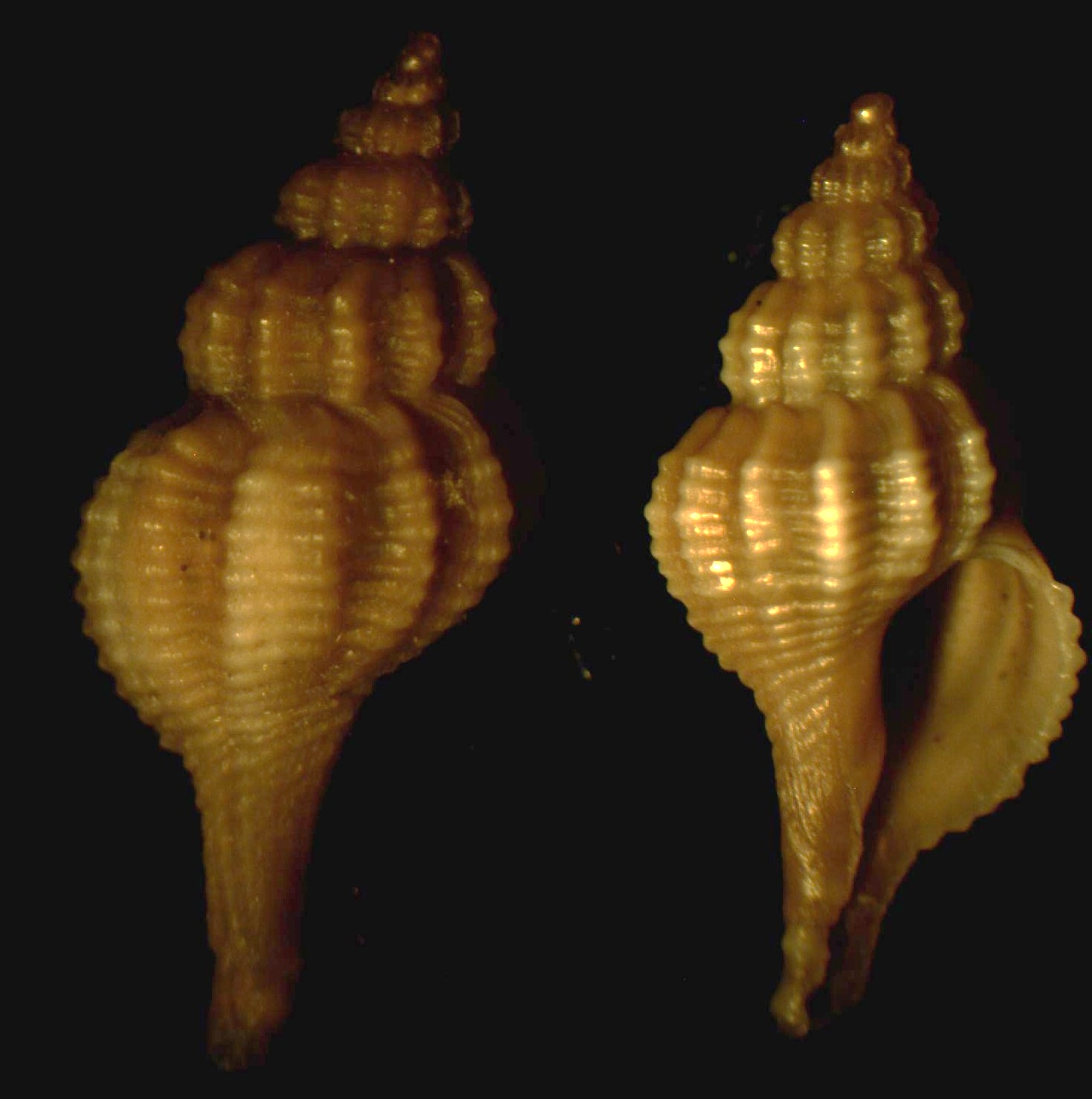

Scientific classification
- Kingdom: Animalia
- Phylum: Mollusca
- Class: Gastropoda
- Subclass: Caenogastropoda
- Order: Neogastropoda
- Family: Muricidae
- Subfamily: Pagodulinae
- Genus: Trophonopsis
- Species: T. muricata

Binomial name
- Trophonopsis muricata (Montagu, 1803)

Synonyms
- See list

= Trophonopsis muricata =

Species of gastropod

Trophonopsis muricata is a species of sea snail, a marine gastropod mollusk in the family Muricidae, the murex snails or rock snails.

== Description ==
The size of an adult shell varies between 10 mm and 20 mm. The narrow, conical shell has seven or eight tumid whorls, crossed by numerous transverse ribs (15 to 20 on the penultimate whorl), spiral ridges and fine growth lines. These ribs are narrow and interact with spiral ridges, forming a deep reticulate pattern with raised tubercles. The thin outer lip is straight, crenulate andshows internal grooves. It is marked with inflection at the base of the siphonal canal. This siphonal canal is long (about 25% of the length of the shell), narrow and almost straight. The color of the shell is yellowish (often with spiral brown bands), flesh-colored or sometimes white.

The ova-capsules are described by Jeffreys as about a line in diameter, with an oval orifice. The contain a purplish liquor together with the fry. The animal is light yellow or whitish. It is eaten by fishes : Trigla lyra and Peristedion cataphractum.

== Distribution ==
This species occurs in sublittoral European waters, in the Mediterranean Sea, in the Black Sea, in the Northwest Atlantic Ocean off Portugal, Spain and the Azores

== Synonyms ==
- Fusus asperrimus Leach in Brown, 1827
- Fusus cancellatus Bivona, 1838
- Fusus longurio Weinkauff, 1866
- Murex muricatus Montagu, 1803
- Murex recticanalis Wood, 1879
- Murex sculptus Bellardi, 1872
- Pseudofusus rostratus var. sowerbyana Monterosato, 1890
- Raphitoma asperrima (Brown, 1827)
- Trophon curta Locard, 1892
- Trophon muricatus (Montagu, 1803)
- Trophon muricatus albinus Settepassi, 1977 (not available, published in a work which does not consistently use binomial nomenclature (ICZN art. 11.4))
- Trophon muricatus major Settepassi, 1977 (not available, published in a work which does not consistently use binomial nomenclature (ICZN art. 11.4))
- Trophon muricatus var. aspera Monterosato in Bucquoy & Dautzenberg, 1882
- Trophon muricatus var. lactea Jeffreys, 1867
- Trophon muricatus var. major Monterosato in Bucquoy & Dautzenberg, 1882
- Trophon muricatus var. minor Monterosato in Bucquoy & Dautzenberg, 1882
- Trophonopsis curta Locard, 1892
- Trophonopsis forestii Ruggieri, 1947
- Trophonopsis forestii coeni Ruggieri, 1947
- Trophonopsis gortani Ruggieri, 1947
- Trophonopsis longurio Bucquoy & Dautzenberg, 1882 ·
- Trophonopsis muricata var. minor Locard, 1897
- Trophonopsis muricatus albinus Monterosato in Settepassi, 1977
- Trophonopsis muricatus var. minor Locard, 1897
