= Trophonopsis breviata =

Scientific classification
- Kingdom: Animalia
- Phylum: Mollusca
- Class: Gastropoda
- Subclass: Caenogastropoda
- Order: Neogastropoda
- Family: Muricidae
- Subfamily: Pagodulinae
- Genus: Trophonopsis
- Species: T. breviata

Binomial name
- Trophonopsis breviata (Jeffreys, 1882)

Synonyms
- Trophon breviatus Jeffreys, 1882 (basionym); Trophon breviatus var. lactea Milaschewitsch, 1916; Trophon breviatus var. striata Milaschewitsch, 1916

Species of gastropod

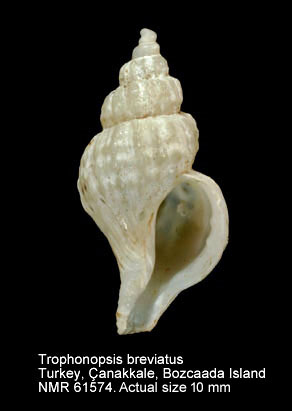
Trophonopsis breviata.

Trophonopsis breviata is a species of sea snail, a marine gastropod mollusk in the family Muricidae, the murex snails or rock snails.

== Description ==
The shell grows to a length of 12.5 mm.

== Distribution ==
This species is found in the Mediterranean Sea off Greece and in the Black Sea.
