= Trophonopsis diazi =

Scientific classification
- Kingdom: Animalia
- Phylum: Mollusca
- Class: Gastropoda
- Subclass: Caenogastropoda
- Order: Neogastropoda
- Family: Muricidae
- Subfamily: Pagodulinae
- Genus: Trophonopsis
- Species: T. diazi

Binomial name
- Trophonopsis diazi (Durham, 1942)

Synonyms
- Trophon (Boreotrophon) diazi Durham, 1942

Species of gastropod

Trophonopsis diazi is a species of sea snail, a marine gastropod mollusk in the family Muricidae, the murex snails or rock snails.
