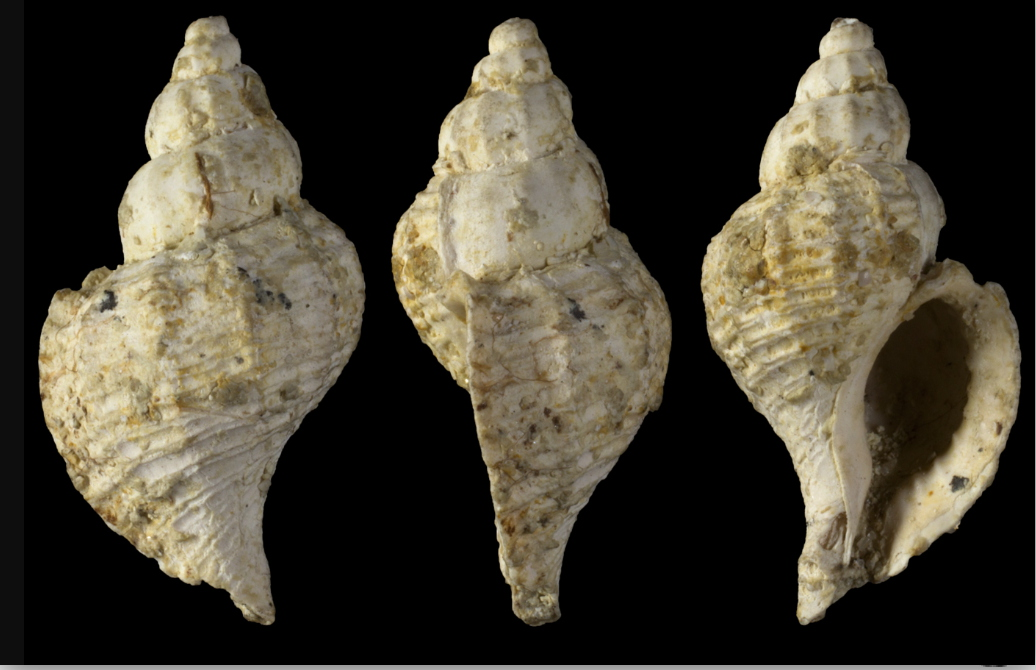
- Shell of Trophonopsis bonneti (holotype at MNHN, Paris)

Scientific classification
- Kingdom: Animalia
- Phylum: Mollusca
- Class: Gastropoda
- Subclass: Caenogastropoda
- Order: Neogastropoda
- Family: Muricidae
- Subfamily: Pagodulinae
- Genus: Trophonopsis
- Species: T. bonneti

Binomial name
- Trophonopsis bonneti (Cossmann, 1913)

Synonyms
- † Urosalpinx bonneti Cossmann, 1913

= Trophonopsis bonneti =

Species of gastropod

Trophonopsis bonneti is an extinct species of sea snail, a marine gastropod mollusk in the family Muricidae, the murex snails or rock snails.

== Distribution ==
Fossils were found in Eocene strata of Paris Basin, France.
