= P. aculeata =

P. aculeata may refer to:

- Pagodula aculeata, a species of sea snail in the family Muricidae
- Paralomis aculeata, a species of king crab
- Parkinsonia aculeata, palo verde, a species of flowering tree in the family Fabaceae
- Parmentiera aculeata, cow okra, a species of flowering tree in the family Bignoniaceae
- Pentidotea aculeata, a species of isopod in the family Idoteidae
- Pereskia aculeata, Barbados gooseberry, a species of shrub in the family Cactaceae
- Petrophile aculeata, a species of flowering plant in the family Proteaceae
- Pleurotomella aculeata, a species of sea snail in the family Raphitomidae
