= Comptella coronata =

Scientific classification
- Kingdom: Animalia
- Phylum: Mollusca
- Class: Gastropoda
- Subclass: Caenogastropoda
- Order: Neogastropoda
- Family: Muricidae
- Genus: Comptella
- Species: C. coronata

Binomial name
- Comptella coronata Dell, 1956

Species of gastropod

Comptella coronata is a species of sea snail, a marine gastropod mollusk in the family Muricidae, the murex snails or rock snails.

== Distribution ==
This marine species is endemic to New Zealand.
