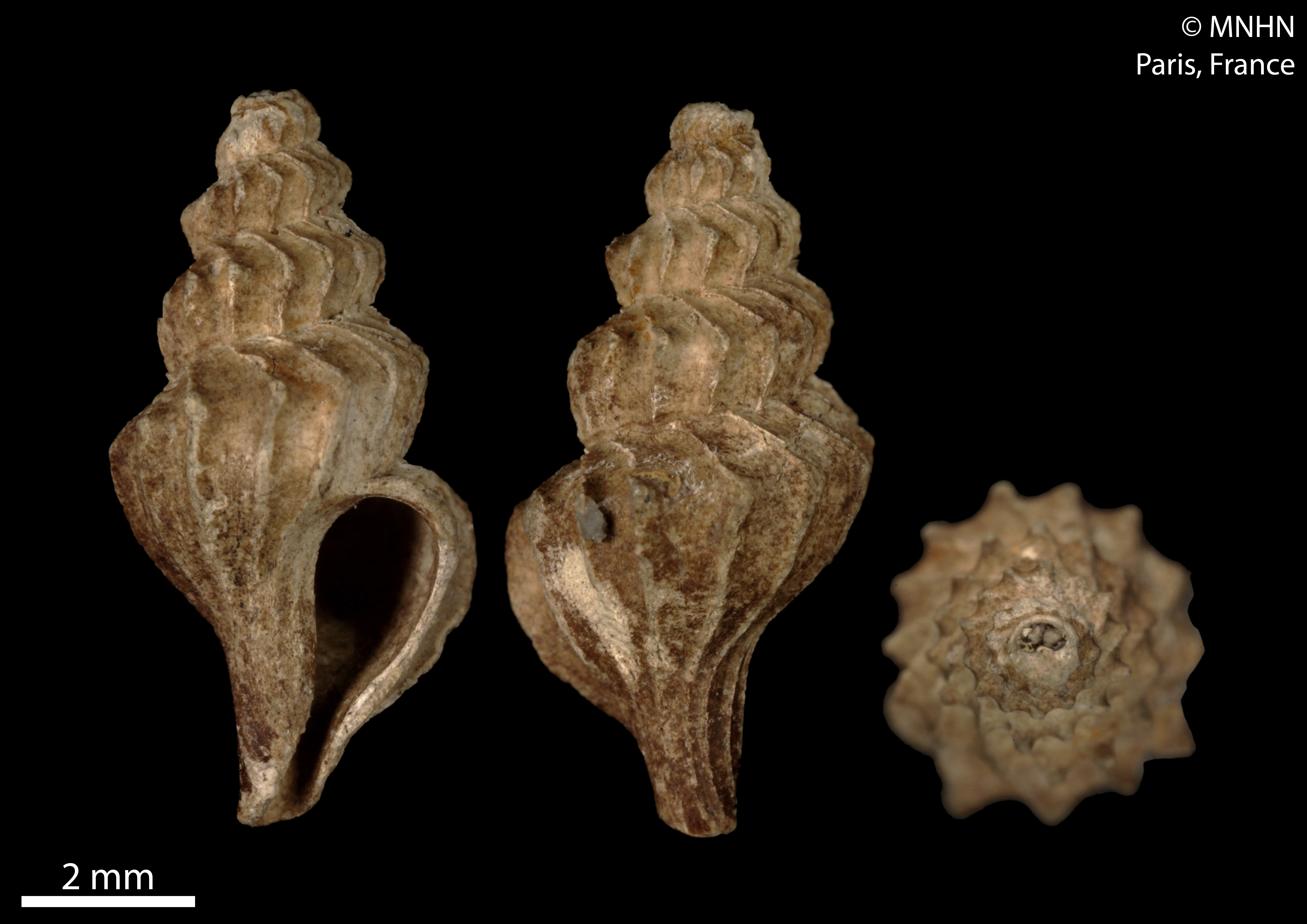
- Shell of Pagodula lacunella (specimen at MNHN, Paris)

Scientific classification
- Kingdom: Animalia
- Phylum: Mollusca
- Class: Gastropoda
- Subclass: Caenogastropoda
- Order: Neogastropoda
- Family: Muricidae
- Genus: Pagodula
- Species: P. lacunella

Binomial name
- Pagodula lacunella (Dall, 1889)

Synonyms
- Trophon lacunellus Dall, 1889

= Pagodula lacunella =

Species of gastropod

Pagodula lacunella is a species of sea snail, a marine gastropod mollusc in the family Muricidae, the murex snails or rock snails.

== Distribution ==
This species occurs in the Caribbean Sea, the Gulf of Mexico and off the Lesser Antilles.
