= Pagodula parechinata =

Scientific classification
- Kingdom: Animalia
- Phylum: Mollusca
- Class: Gastropoda
- Subclass: Caenogastropoda
- Order: Neogastropoda
- Family: Muricidae
- Genus: Pagodula
- Species: P. parechinata

Binomial name
- Pagodula parechinata Houart, 2001

Species of gastropod

Pagodula parechinata is a species of sea snail, a marine gastropod mollusk in the family Muricidae, the murex snails or rock snails.

== Distribution ==
This species occurs in the Atlantic Ocean off the Canary Islands.
