= Enixotrophon cuspidarioides =

Scientific classification
- Kingdom: Animalia
- Phylum: Mollusca
- Class: Gastropoda
- Subclass: Caenogastropoda
- Order: Neogastropoda
- Family: Muricidae
- Genus: Enixotrophon
- Species: E. cuspidarioides

Binomial name
- Enixotrophon cuspidarioides Powell, 1951

Synonyms
- Trophon cuspidarioides (Powell, 1951)

Species of gastropod

Enixotrophon cuspidarioides is a species of sea snail, a marine gastropod mollusk in the family Muricidae, the murex snails or rock snails.

== Distribution ==
This species occurs in Antarctic waters.
