= Enixotrophon fasciolarioides =

Scientific classification
- Kingdom: Animalia
- Phylum: Mollusca
- Class: Gastropoda
- Subclass: Caenogastropoda
- Order: Neogastropoda
- Family: Muricidae
- Subfamily: Pagodulinae
- Genus: Enixotrophon
- Species: E. fasciolarioides

Binomial name
- Enixotrophon fasciolarioides (Pastorino & Scarabino, 2008)

Synonyms
- Trophon fasciolarioides Pastorino, 2008 (original combination); Trophonopsis fasciolarioides (Pastorino & Scarabino, 2008) ·

Species of gastropod

Enixotrophon fasciolarioides is a species of sea snail, a marine gastropod mollusk in the family Muricidae, the murex snails or rock snails.
