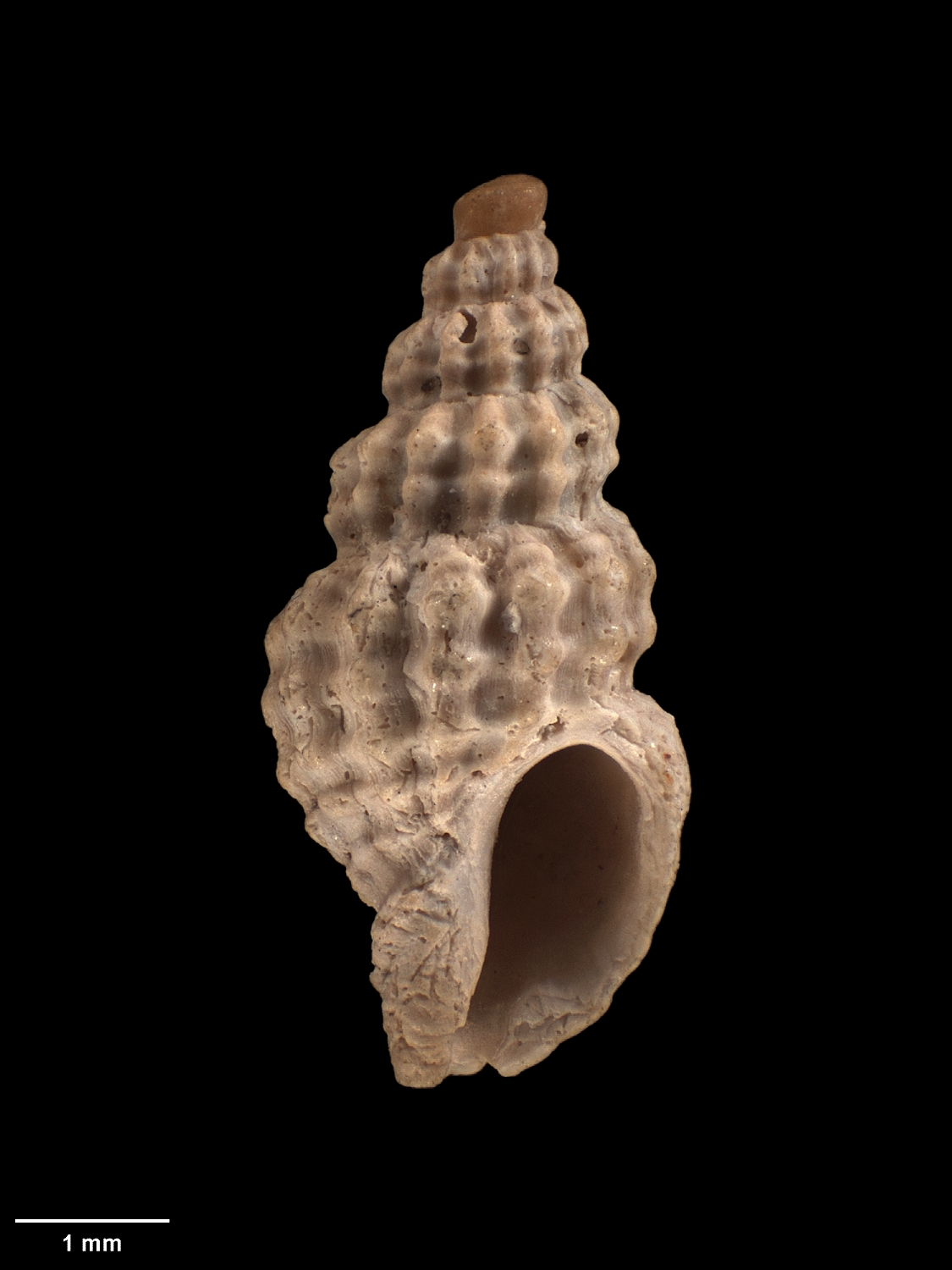
- Shell of Comptella curta held at Te Papa, Wellington

Scientific classification
- Kingdom: Animalia
- Phylum: Mollusca
- Class: Gastropoda
- Subclass: Caenogastropoda
- Order: Neogastropoda
- Family: Muricidae
- Genus: Comptella
- Species: C. curta

Binomial name
- Comptella curta (Murdoch, 1905)

Synonyms
- Trophon (Kalydon) curta Murdoch, 1905

= Comptella curta =

Species of gastropod

Comptella curta is a species of sea snail, a marine gastropod mollusk in the family Muricidae, the murex snails or rock snails.

== Distribution ==
This marine species is endemic to New Zealand.
