= Enixotrophon similidroueti =

Scientific classification
- Kingdom: Animalia
- Phylum: Mollusca
- Class: Gastropoda
- Subclass: Caenogastropoda
- Order: Neogastropoda
- Family: Muricidae
- Subfamily: Pagodulinae
- Genus: Enixotrophon
- Species: E. similidroueti

Binomial name
- Enixotrophon similidroueti (Houart, 1989)

Synonyms
- Trophon similidroueti Houart, 1989 (original combination); Trophonopsis similidroueti (Houart, 1989)

Species of gastropod

Enixotrophon similidroueti is a species of sea snail, a marine gastropod mollusk in the family Muricidae, the murex snails or rock snails.
