= Pagodula golikovi =

Scientific classification
- Kingdom: Animalia
- Phylum: Mollusca
- Class: Gastropoda
- Subclass: Caenogastropoda
- Order: Neogastropoda
- Family: Muricidae
- Genus: Pagodula
- Species: P. golikovi

Binomial name
- Pagodula golikovi (Egorov, 1992)

Synonyms
- Boreotrophon golikovi Egorov, 1992

Species of gastropod

Pagodula golikovi is a species of sea snail, a marine gastropod mollusk in the family Muricidae, the murex snails or rock snails.
