= Pagodula verrillii =

Scientific classification
- Kingdom: Animalia
- Phylum: Mollusca
- Class: Gastropoda
- Subclass: Caenogastropoda
- Order: Neogastropoda
- Family: Muricidae
- Genus: Pagodula
- Species: P. verrillii

Binomial name
- Pagodula verrillii (Bush, 1893)

Synonyms
- Trophon verrillii Bush, 1893

Species of gastropod

Pagodula verrillii is a species of sea snail, a marine gastropod mollusk in the family Muricidae, the murex snails or rock snails.
