= Comptella devia =

Scientific classification
- Kingdom: Animalia
- Phylum: Mollusca
- Class: Gastropoda
- Subclass: Caenogastropoda
- Order: Neogastropoda
- Family: Muricidae
- Genus: Comptella
- Species: C. devia

Binomial name
- Comptella devia (Suter, 1908)

Synonyms
- Mangelia devia Suter, 1908; Mangilia devia Suter, 1908

Species of gastropod

Comptella devia is a species of sea snail, a marine gastropod mollusk in the family Muricidae, the murex snails or rock snails.

== Distribution ==
This marine species is endemic to New Zealand.
