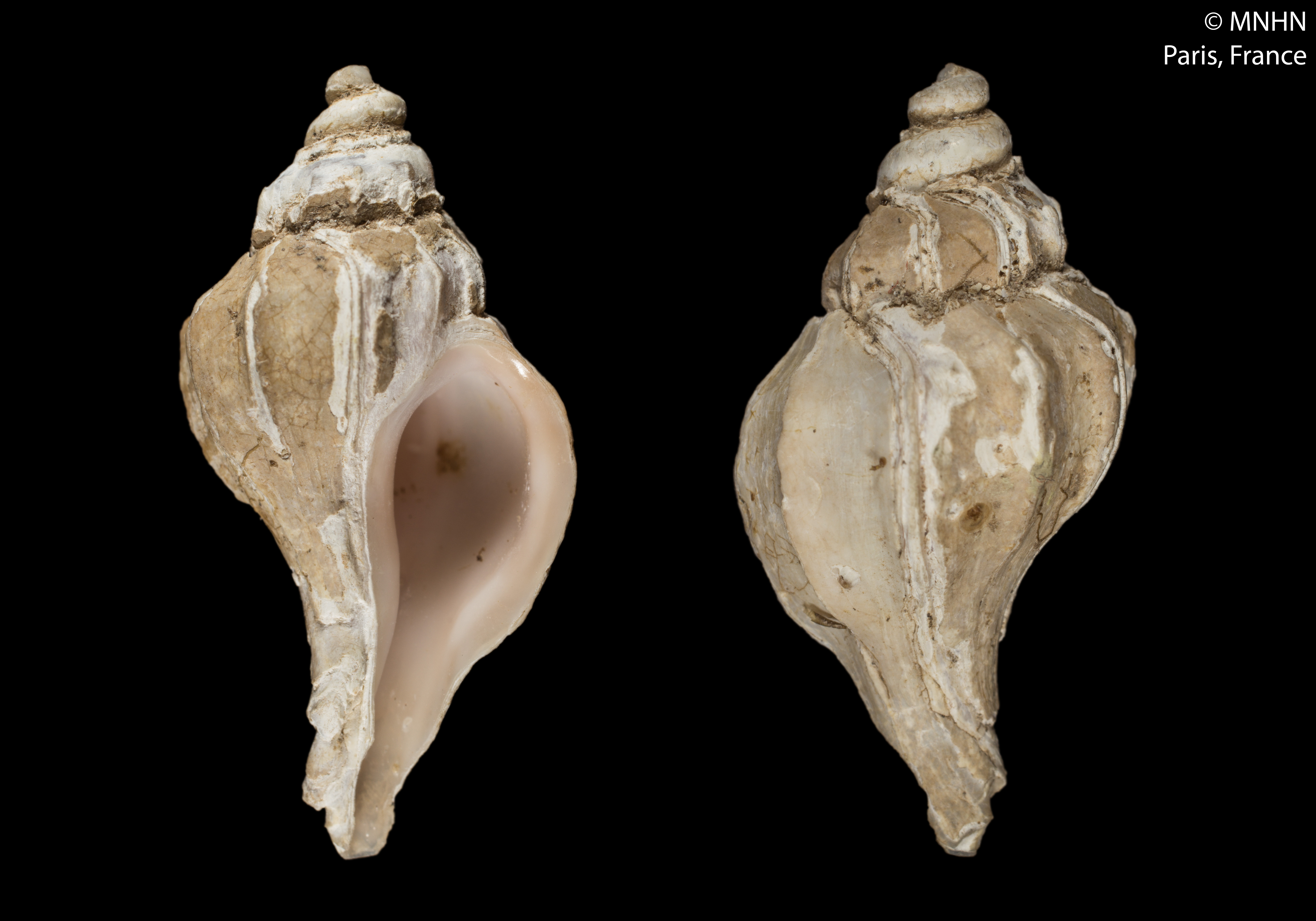
- Shell of Enixotrophon atanua (holotype at MNHN, Paris)

Scientific classification
- Kingdom: Animalia
- Phylum: Mollusca
- Class: Gastropoda
- Subclass: Caenogastropoda
- Order: Neogastropoda
- Superfamily: Muricoidea
- Family: Muricidae
- Subfamily: Pagodulinae
- Genus: Enixotrophon; Iredale, 1929

Type species
- Trophon carduelis R. B. Watson, 1882

= Enixotrophon =

Genus of gastropods

Enixotrophon is a genus of sea snails, marine gastropod mollusks in the subfamily Pagodulinae of the family Muricidae, the murex snails or rock snails.

== Species ==
Species within the genus Enixotrophon include:

- Enixotrophon acceptans (Barnard, 1959)
- Enixotrophon araios (Houart & Engl, 2007)
- Enixotrophon arnaudi (Pastorino, 2002)
- Enixotrophon atanua (Houart & Tröndle, 2008)
- Enixotrophon carduelis (R. B. Watson, 1882)
- Enixotrophon ceciliae (Houart, 2003)
- Enixotrophon columbarioides (Pastorino & Scarabino, 2008)
- Enixotrophon concepcionensis (Houart & Sellanes, 2006)
- Enixotrophon condei (Houart, 2003)
- Enixotrophon cuspidarioides (Powell, 1951)
- Enixotrophon declinans (R. B. Watson, 1882)
- † Enixotrophon delli (Beu, 1967)
- Enixotrophon emilyae (Pastorino, 2002)
- Enixotrophon eos (B. A. Marshall & Houart, 2011)
- Enixotrophon eumorphus (B. A. Marshall & Houart, 2011)
- Enixotrophon fasciolarioides (Pastorino & Scarabino, 2008)
- Enixotrophon hastulus (B. A. Marshall & Houart, 2011)
- Enixotrophon karubar Houart, 2023
- Enixotrophon kosunorum (Houart & Lan, 2003)
- Enixotrophon latus (B. A. Marshall & Houart, 2011)
- Enixotrophon lochi (B. A. Marshall & Houart, 2011)
- Enixotrophon macquariensis (Powell, 1957)
- Enixotrophon maxwelli (B. A. Marshall & Houart, 2011)
- Enixotrophon multigradus (Houart, 1990)
- Enixotrophon obtuseliratus (Schepman, 1911)
- Enixotrophon obtusus (B. A. Marshall & Houart, 2011)
- Enixotrophon occiduus (B. A. Marshall & Houart, 2011)
- Enixotrophon petalospeira Houart & Buge, 2022
- Enixotrophon pistillum (Barnard, 1959)
- Enixotrophon planispinus (E. A. Smith, 1906)
- Enixotrophon plicilaminatus (Verco, 1909)
- Enixotrophon poirieria (Powell, 1951)
- Enixotrophon procerus (Houart, 2001)
- Enixotrophon pulchellus (Schepman, 1911)
- Enixotrophon pumilus B. A. Marshall & Houart, 2022
- Enixotrophon pygmaeus (B. A. Marshall & Houart, 2011)
- Enixotrophon sansibaricus (Thiele, 1925)
- Enixotrophon siberutensis (Thiele, 1925)
- Enixotrophon similidroueti (Houart, 1989)
- Enixotrophon tangaroa (B. A. Marshall & Houart, 2011)
- Enixotrophon tenuirostratus (E. A. Smith, 1899)
- Enixotrophon vangoethemi (Houart, 2003)
- Enixotrophon venustus (B. A. Marshall & Houart, 2011)
- Enixotrophon veronicae (Pastorino, 1999)

Synonyms

- Enixotrophon johannthielei (Barnard, 1959): synonym of Enixotrophon pulchellus (Schepman, 1911)
- Enixotrophon ziczac (Tiba, 1981): synonym of Enixotrophon pulchellus (Schepman, 1911)
