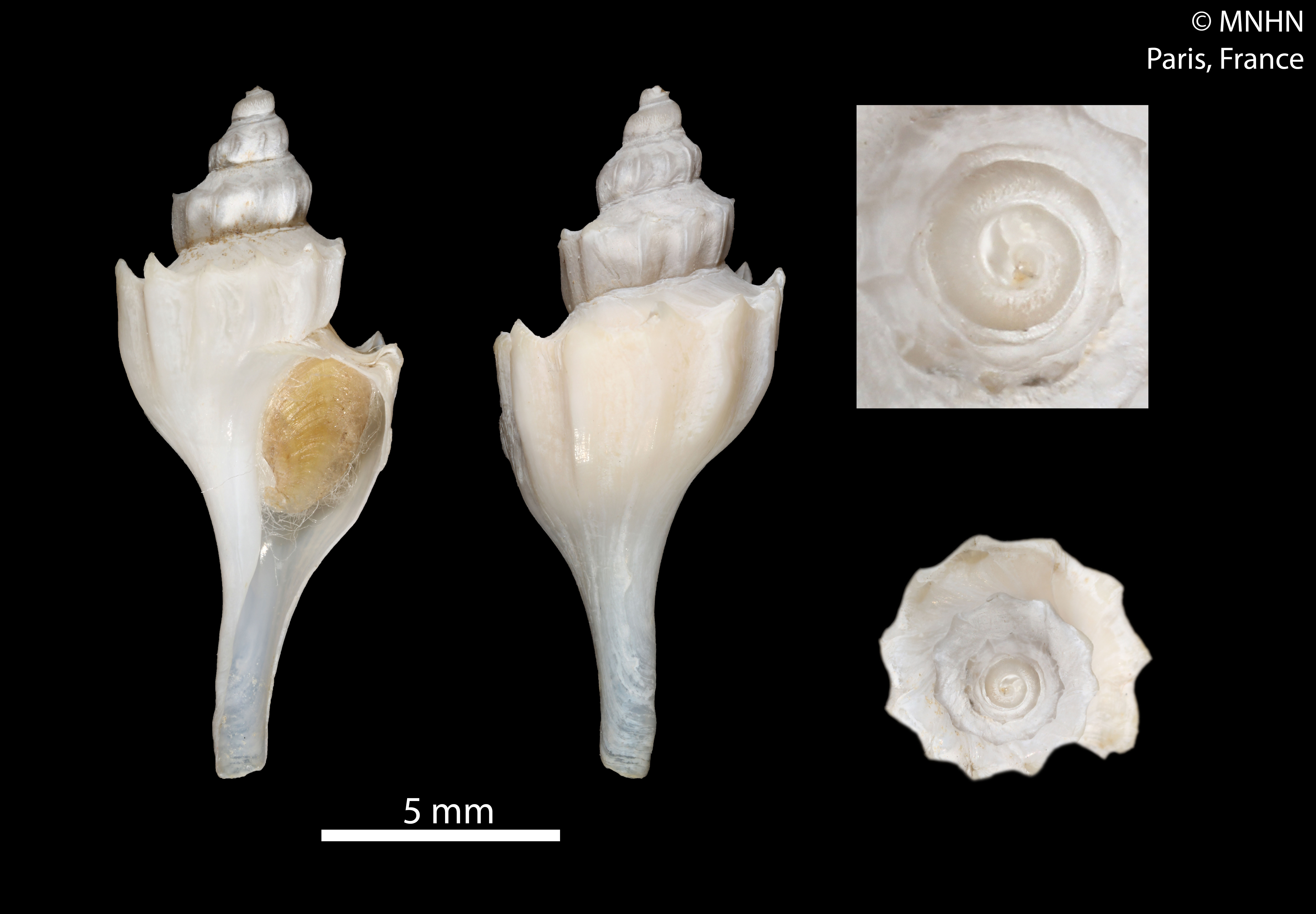

Scientific classification
- Kingdom: Animalia
- Phylum: Mollusca
- Class: Gastropoda
- Subclass: Caenogastropoda
- Order: Neogastropoda
- Family: Muricidae
- Genus: Enixotrophon
- Species: E. vangoethemi

Binomial name
- Enixotrophon vangoethemi (Houart, 2003)

Synonyms
- Trophon vangoethemi Houart, 2003

= Enixotrophon vangoethemi =

Species of gastropod

Enixotrophon vangoethemi is a species of sea snail, a marine gastropod mollusk in the family Muricidae, the murex snails or rock snails.
