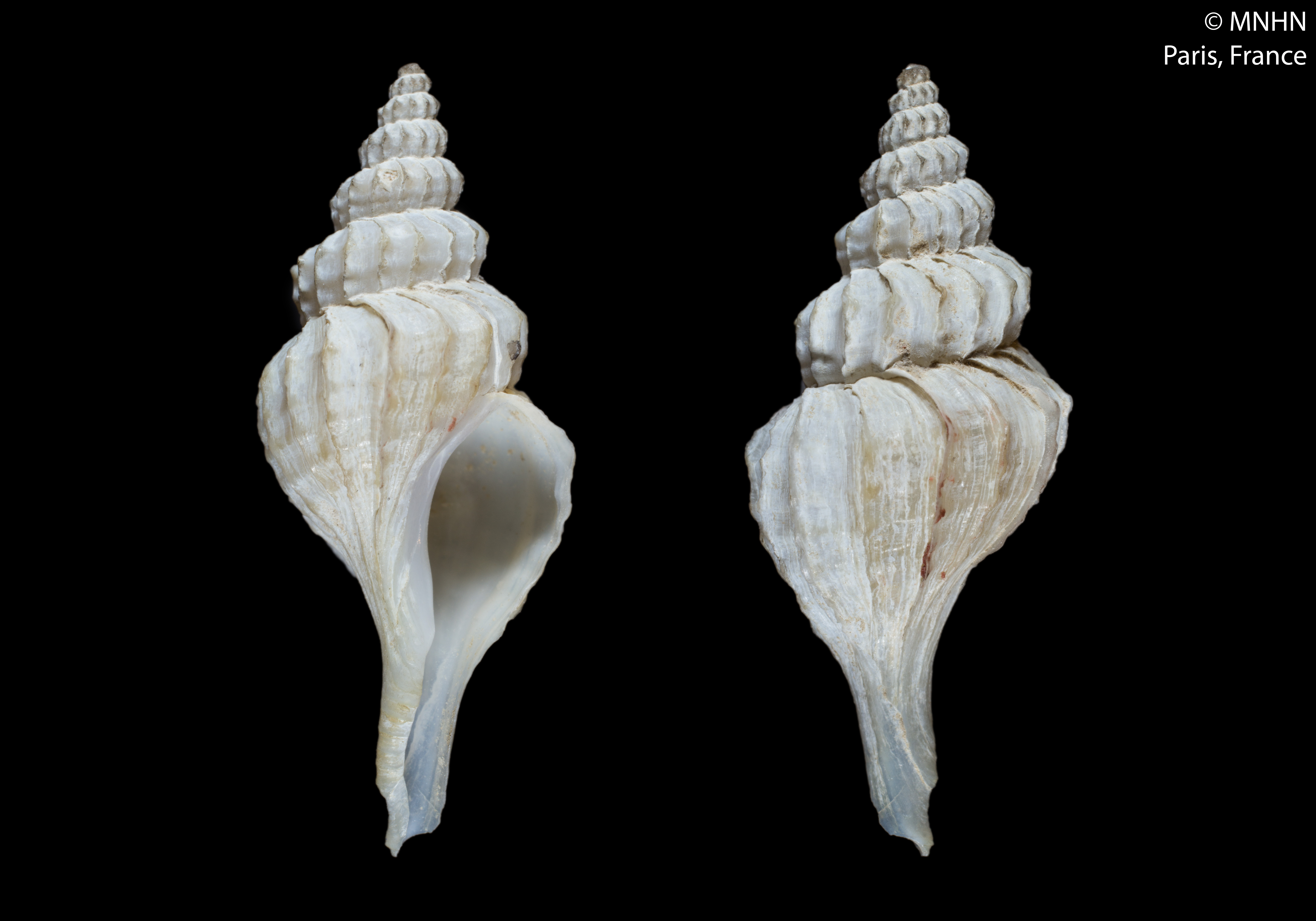
- Shell of Pagodula cossmanni

Scientific classification
- Kingdom: Animalia
- Phylum: Mollusca
- Class: Gastropoda
- Subclass: Caenogastropoda
- Order: Neogastropoda
- Family: Muricidae
- Genus: Pagodula
- Species: P. cossmanni

Binomial name
- Pagodula cossmanni (Locard, 1897)

Synonyms
- Trophon cossmanni Locard, 1897; Trophon deversus Locard, 1897

= Pagodula cossmanni =

Species of gastropod

Pagodula cossmanni is a small species of deep sea snail, a marine gastropod mollusk in the family Muricidae, the murex snails or rock snails.

== Description ==
Pagodula cossmanni is a marine gastropod mollusk belonging to the family Muricidae, commonly known as murex snails or rock snails. This species was first described by Gatliff & Gabriel in 1911.

== Distribution ==
This species occurs in the Atlantic Ocean off the Azores.
