= Pagodula fraseri =

Scientific classification
- Kingdom: Animalia
- Phylum: Mollusca
- Class: Gastropoda
- Subclass: Caenogastropoda
- Order: Neogastropoda
- Family: Muricidae
- Genus: Pagodula
- Species: P. fraseri

Binomial name
- Pagodula fraseri (Knudsen, 1956)

Synonyms
- Trophon fraseri Knudsen, 1956

Species of gastropod

Pagodula fraseri is a species of sea snail, a marine gastropod mollusk in the family Muricidae, the murex snails or rock snails.
