= Pagodula limicola =

Scientific classification
- Kingdom: Animalia
- Phylum: Mollusca
- Class: Gastropoda
- Subclass: Caenogastropoda
- Order: Neogastropoda
- Family: Muricidae
- Genus: Pagodula
- Species: P. limicola

Binomial name
- Pagodula limicola Verrill, 1885

Synonyms
- Boreotrophon abyssorum var. limicola Verrill, 1885

Species of gastropod

Pagodula limicola is a species of sea snail, a marine gastropod mollusk in the family Muricidae, the murex snails or rock snails.
