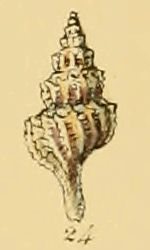

Scientific classification
- Kingdom: Animalia
- Phylum: Mollusca
- Class: Gastropoda
- Subclass: Caenogastropoda
- Order: Neogastropoda
- Family: Muricidae
- Subfamily: Pagodulinae
- Genus: Trophonopsis
- Species: T. barvicensis

Binomial name
- Trophonopsis barvicensis (Johnston, 1825)

Synonyms
- Fusus barvicensis Johnston, 1825 (original combination); Trophon barvicensis (Johnston, 1825)

= Trophonopsis barvicensis =

Species of gastropod

Trophonopsis barvicensis is a species of sea snail, a marine gastropod mollusk in the family Muricidae, the murex snails or rock snails.

== Description ==
The white shell has a fusiform shape. It measures up to 15 mm, with a moderately high spire of shouldered whorls. The protoconch is small and consists of little more than one whorl. The teleoconch shows a sculpture of axial lamellae and spiral cords (4–5 on penultimate whorl) forming a coarse lattice. The outer lip is simple, not thickened but with the termination of cords reflected inside as folds. The siphonal canal is long and delicate, often curved, and widely open.

The living animal is commonly covered by a sponge, which fills in the depressions of the sculpture.

== Distribution ==
This marine species occurs in European waters (from Iceland and northern Norway to Morocco); in the Atlantic Ocean off the Azores (Some forms possibly attributed to this species); in the Mediterranean Sea (only in the Alboran Sea)
