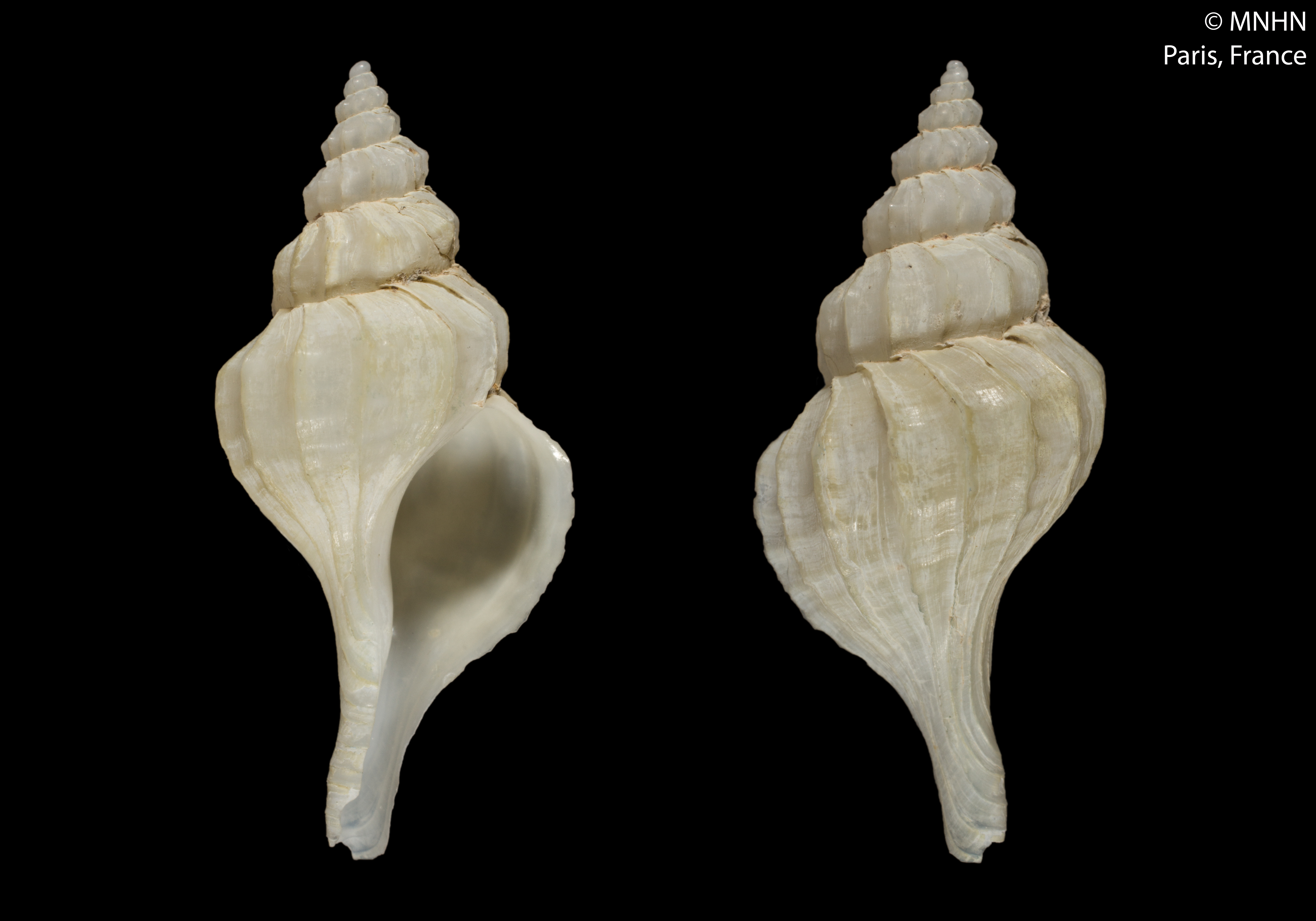

Scientific classification
- Kingdom: Animalia
- Phylum: Mollusca
- Class: Gastropoda
- Subclass: Caenogastropoda
- Order: Neogastropoda
- Family: Muricidae
- Genus: Pagodula
- Species: P. mucrone

Binomial name
- Pagodula mucrone (Houart, 1991)

Synonyms
- Trophon mucrone Houart, 1991

= Pagodula mucrone =

Species of gastropod

Pagodula mucrone is a species of sea snail, a marine gastropod mollusk in the family Muricidae, the murex snails or rock snails.

== Description ==
The length of the shell attains 26.5 mm.

== Distribution ==
This species occurs in the Atlantic Ocean off Southeast Brazil.
