= Pagodula abyssorum =

Scientific classification
- Kingdom: Animalia
- Phylum: Mollusca
- Class: Gastropoda
- Subclass: Caenogastropoda
- Order: Neogastropoda
- Family: Muricidae
- Genus: Pagodula
- Species: P. abyssorum

Binomial name
- Pagodula abyssorum (Verrill, 1885)

Synonyms
- Boreotrophon abyssorum (A. E. Verrill, 1885); Trophon abyssorum Verrill, 1885

Species of gastropod

Pagodula abyssorum is a species of sea snail, a marine gastropod mollusk in the family Muricidae, the murex snails or rock snails.
