= Pagodula echinata =

Scientific classification
- Kingdom: Animalia
- Phylum: Mollusca
- Class: Gastropoda
- Subclass: Caenogastropoda
- Order: Neogastropoda
- Family: Muricidae
- Genus: Pagodula
- Species: P. echinata

Binomial name
- Pagodula echinata (Kiener, 1840)

Synonyms
- See list

Species of gastropod

Pagodula echinata is a species of sea snail, a marine gastropod mollusk in the family Muricidae, the murex snails or rock snails.

== Synonyms ==
- Fusus echinatus Kiener, 1840
- Pagodula carinata (Bivona, 1832) sensu Monterosato, 1884 (misidentification)
- Pagodula carinata var. cinara Monterosato, 1884
- Pagodula carinata var. tenuis Monterosato, 1884
- Trophon carinatus Jeffreys, 1883
- Trophon carinatus var. cinara Monterosato, 1884
  Trophon carinatus var. depressa Locard, 1897
  Trophon carinatus var. elongata Locard, 1897
- Trophon carinatus var. major Locard, 1897
- Trophon carinatus var. mutica Locard, 1897
- Trophon carinatus var. spinosa Locard, 1897
- Trophon carinatus var. tenuis Monterosato, 1884
- Trophon echinatus (Kiener, 1840) (currently placed in genus Pagodula)
- Trophon grimaldii Dautzenberg & Fischer, 1896
- Trophon multilamellosus auct. (not Philippi, 1844)
- Trophon vaginatus auct. (not Cristofori & Jan, 1832)
- Trophonopsis carinata aculeata Settepassi, 1977 (not available, published in a work which does not consistently use binomial nomenclature (ICZN art. 11.4))
- Trophonopsis carinata hirta Settepassi, 1977 (not available, published in a work which does not consistently use binomial nomenclature (ICZN art. 11.4))
- Trophonopsis carinata multiaculeata Settepassi, 1977 (not available, published in a work which does not consistently use binomial nomenclature (ICZN art. 11.4))
- Trophonopsis carinatus aculeatus Settepassi, 1977
- Trophonopsis carinatus hirtus Settepassi, 1977
- Trophonopsis carinatus multiaculeatus Settepassi, 1977
- Trophonopsis carinatus var. depressa Locard, 1897
- Trophonopsis carinatus var. elongata Locard, 1897
- Trophonopsis carinatus var. major Locard, 1897
- Trophonopsis carinatus var. 'mutica' Locard, 1897
- Trophonopsis carinatus var. spinosa Locard, 1897
- Trophonopsis varicosissimus var. major Locard, 1897

== Taxonomy ==
The names Trophon carinatus and Trophon vaginatus, established for fossils, have been used during much of the 19th and 20th century to designate the Recent species now validly known as Pagodula echinata.

== Description ==
The hyaline, white shell has a fusiformshape. Its length measures up to 25 mm but generally no more than 15 mm. The small protoconch is smooth and consists of little more than one whorl. The teleoconch contains 6-7 whorls bearing a very strong median keel and delicate, foliated varixes (6-9 on the body whorl) forming elongated projections at their intersection with the keel. There is no other spiral sculpture is present. The outer lip simple, with a peripheral projection terminating the keel. The siphonal canal is long and delicate, widely open.

The taxonomy of deep-water forms related to this species is unsettled (see comments in Bouchet & Warén, 1985); some of these correspond to the nominal species Pagodula cossmani (Locard, 1897) which differs in lacking long projections along the shoulder which is not so pronounced, and in having spiral cords below the shoulder in a pattern recalling Trophonopsis barvicensis (Johnston, 1825).

== Distribution ==
This marine species occurs in the Eastern Atlantic, from the Bay of Biscay to Morocco; in the Mediterranean Sea, usually in 100–300 m depth. Gorringe seamount, moderately common in 330–830 m, but not found on the other Lusitanian seamounts.
