= Pagodula carinata =

Scientific classification
- Kingdom: Animalia
- Phylum: Mollusca
- Class: Gastropoda
- Subclass: Caenogastropoda
- Order: Neogastropoda
- Family: Muricidae
- Genus: Pagodula
- Species: P. carinata

Binomial name
- Pagodula carinata (Bivona, 1832)

Synonyms
- † Trophonopsis carinata (Bivona, 1832); † Trophonopsis carinatus (Bivona, 1832); † Trophonopsis varicosissimus (Michelotti, 1841) (dubious synonym)

Extinct species of gastropod

Pagodula carinatus is a fossil species of sea snail, a marine gastropod mollusk in the family Muricidae, the murex snails or rock snails.

The names Trophon carinatus Jeffreys, 1883 and Trophon vaginatus auct. (not Cristofori & Jan 1832), established for fossils, have been used during much of the 19th and 20th century to designate the Recent species now validly known as Pagodula echinata (Kiener, 1840) of which they have become synonyms.
