= Enixotrophon emilyae =

Scientific classification
- Kingdom: Animalia
- Phylum: Mollusca
- Class: Gastropoda
- Subclass: Caenogastropoda
- Order: Neogastropoda
- Family: Muricidae
- Genus: Enixotrophon
- Species: E. emilyae

Binomial name
- Enixotrophon emilyae (Pastorino, 2002)

Synonyms
- Trophon emilyae Pastorino, 2002

Species of gastropod

Enixotrophon emilyae is a species of sea snail, a marine gastropod mollusk in the family Muricidae, the murex snails or rock snails.
