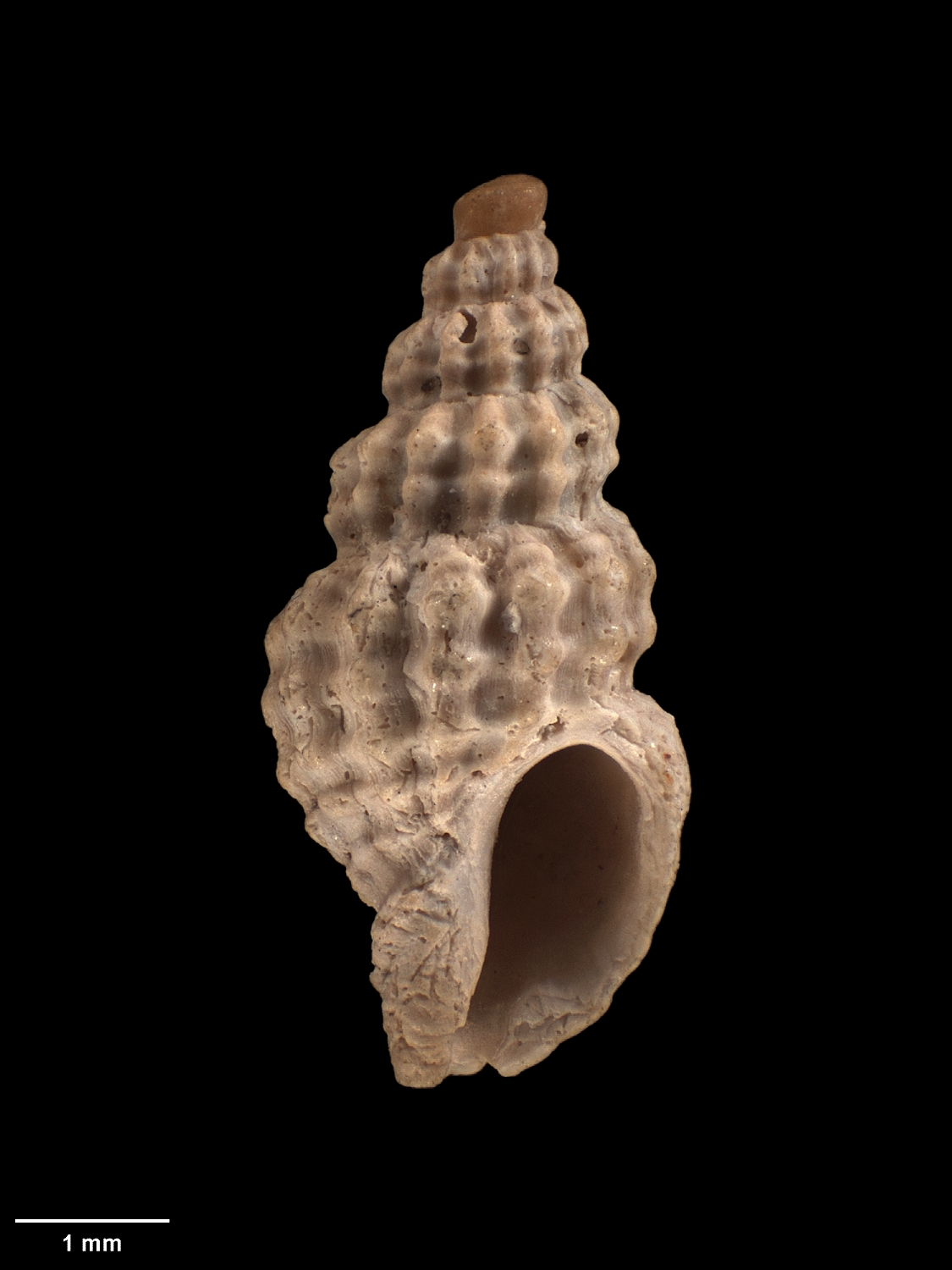
- Comptella curta

Scientific classification
- Kingdom: Animalia
- Phylum: Mollusca
- Class: Gastropoda
- Subclass: Caenogastropoda
- Order: Neogastropoda
- Superfamily: Muricoidea
- Family: Muricidae
- Subfamily: Pagodulinae
- Genus: Comptella; Finlay, 1926

Type species
- Trophon (Kalydon) curta Murdoch, 1905

= Comptella =

Genus of gastropods

Comptella is a genus of sea snails, marine gastropod mollusks in the subfamily Pagodulinae of the family Muricidae, the murex snails or rock snails.

== Species ==
Species within the genus Comptella include:

- Comptella coronata Dell, 1956
- † Comptella crassa Beu, 1967
- Comptella curta (Murdoch, 1905)
- Comptella devia (Suter, 1908)
