= Enixotrophon condei =

Scientific classification
- Kingdom: Animalia
- Phylum: Mollusca
- Class: Gastropoda
- Subclass: Caenogastropoda
- Order: Neogastropoda
- Family: Muricidae
- Genus: Enixotrophon
- Species: E. condei

Binomial name
- Enixotrophon condei (Houart, 2003)

Synonyms
- Pagodula condei (Houart, 2003); Trophon condei Houart, 2003

Species of gastropod

Enixotrophon condei is a species of sea snail, a marine gastropod mollusc in the family Muricidae, the murex snails or rock snails.
