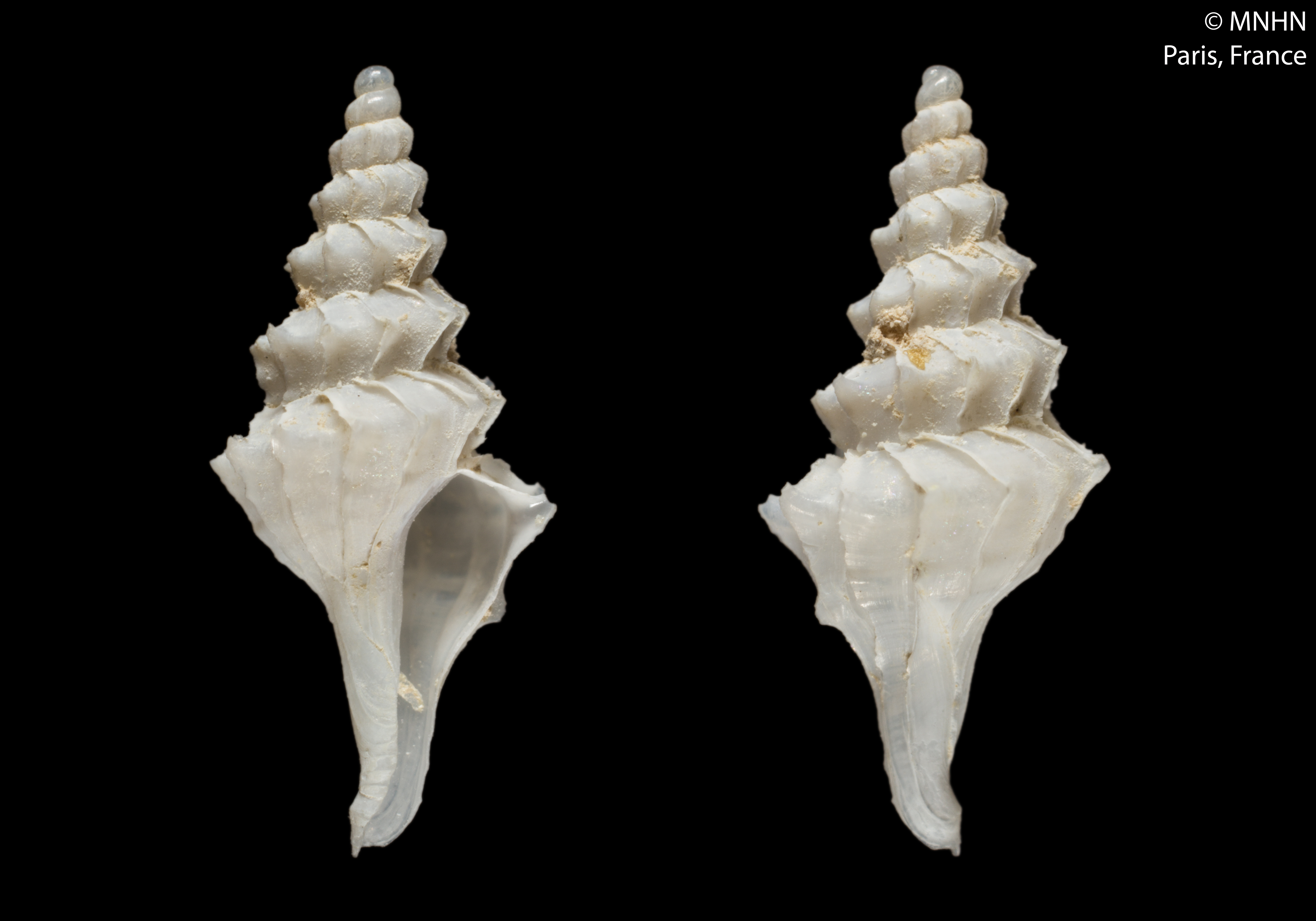
- Shell of Enixotrophon procerus (paratype at MNHN, Paris)

Scientific classification
- Kingdom: Animalia
- Phylum: Mollusca
- Class: Gastropoda
- Subclass: Caenogastropoda
- Order: Neogastropoda
- Family: Muricidae
- Genus: Enixotrophon
- Species: E. procerus

Binomial name
- Enixotrophon procerus (Houart, 2001)

Synonyms
- Pagodula procera Houart, 2001

= Enixotrophon procerus =

Species of gastropod

Enixotrophon procerus is a species of sea snail, a marine gastropod mollusk in the family Muricidae, the murex snails or rock snails.

== Distribution ==
This marine species occurs off New Caledonia.
