= Scabrotrophon densilamellatus =

Scientific classification
- Kingdom: Animalia
- Phylum: Mollusca
- Class: Gastropoda
- Subclass: Caenogastropoda
- Order: Neogastropoda
- Family: Muricidae
- Subfamily: Trophoninae
- Genus: Scabrotrophon
- Species: S. densilamellatus

Binomial name
- Scabrotrophon densilamellatus (Golikov & Gulbin, 1977)

Synonyms
- Trophonopsis densilamellata Golikov & Gulbin, 1977 (original combination)

Species of gastropod

Scabrotrophon densilamellatus is a species of sea snail, a marine gastropod mollusk in the family Muricidae, the murex snails or rock snails.

== Description ==
The shell grows to a length of 30 mm.

== Distribution ==
This species is distributed in the Pacific Ocean along the Kurile Islands, Russia, in the Okhotsk Sea.
