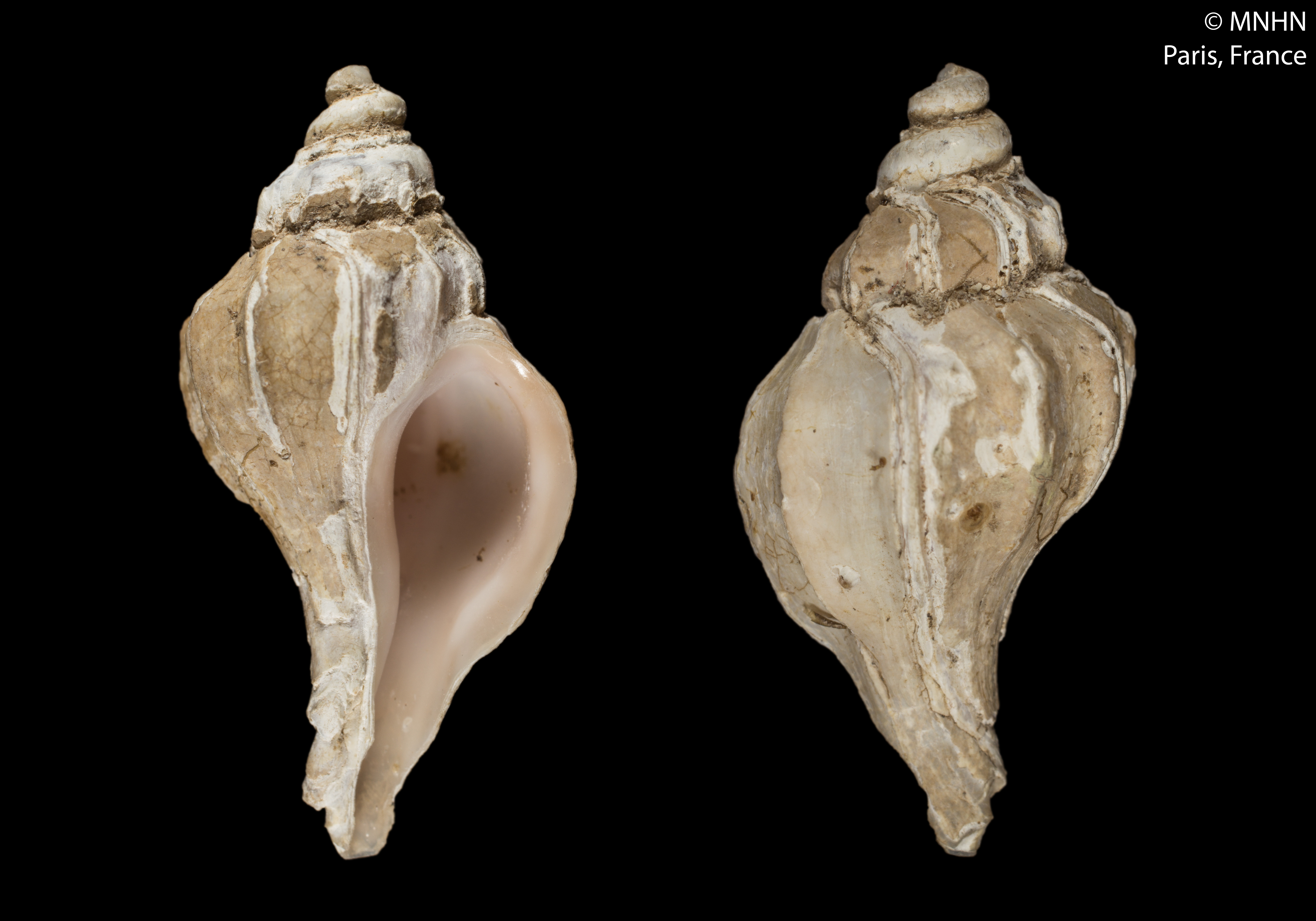
- Shell of Enixotrophon atanua (holotype at MNHN, Paris)

Scientific classification
- Kingdom: Animalia
- Phylum: Mollusca
- Class: Gastropoda
- Subclass: Caenogastropoda
- Order: Neogastropoda
- Family: Muricidae
- Genus: Enixotrophon
- Species: E. atanua

Binomial name
- Enixotrophon atanua (Houart & Tröndlé, 2008)

Synonyms
- Pagodula atanua Houart & Tröndlé, 2008

= Enixotrophon atanua =

Species of gastropod

Enixotrophon atanua is a species of sea snail, a marine gastropod mollusk in the family Muricidae, the murex snails or rock snails.

== Description ==
The length of the shell attains 26.7 mm. The Muricidae family is renowned for its diverse and often elaborate shell morphologies, which are frequently linked to adaptive strategies for predation and habitat specialization.

== Distribution ==
This marine species occurs off the Marquesas Islands.
