= Enixotrophon kosunorum =

Scientific classification
- Kingdom: Animalia
- Phylum: Mollusca
- Class: Gastropoda
- Subclass: Caenogastropoda
- Order: Neogastropoda
- Family: Muricidae
- Genus: Enixotrophon
- Species: E. kosunorum

Binomial name
- Enixotrophon kosunorum (Houart & Lan, 2003)

Synonyms
- Pagodula kosunorum Houart & Lan, 2003

Species of gastropod

Enixotrophon kosunorum is a species of sea snail, a marine gastropod mollusc in the family Muricidae, the murex snails or rock snails.

== Distribution ==
It is distributed in northeast Taiwan.
