= Enixotrophon veronicae =

Scientific classification
- Kingdom: Animalia
- Phylum: Mollusca
- Class: Gastropoda
- Subclass: Caenogastropoda
- Order: Neogastropoda
- Family: Muricidae
- Genus: Enixotrophon
- Species: E. veronicae

Binomial name
- Enixotrophon veronicae (Pastorino, 1999)

Synonyms
- Pagodula veronicae (Pastorino, 1999); Trophon veronicae Pastorino, 1999

Species of gastropod

Enixotrophon veronicae is a species of sea snail, a marine gastropod mollusk in the family Muricidae, the murex snails or rock snails.

== Distribution ==
This marine species occurs off Chile.
