= Enixotrophon siberutensis =

Scientific classification
- Kingdom: Animalia
- Phylum: Mollusca
- Class: Gastropoda
- Subclass: Caenogastropoda
- Order: Neogastropoda
- Family: Muricidae
- Genus: Enixotrophon
- Species: E. siberutensis

Binomial name
- Enixotrophon siberutensis (Thiele, 1925)

Synonyms
- Pagodula siberutensis (Thiele, 1925); Trophon siberutensis Thiele, 1925

Species of gastropod

Enixotrophon siberutensis is a species of sea snail, a marine gastropod mollusk in the family Muricidae, the murex snails or rock snails.

== Distribution ==
This marine species occurs off Western Sumatra.
