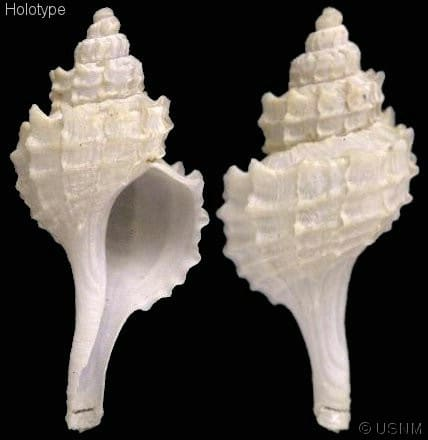
- Holotype specimen of the shell of Enixotrophon arnaudi

Scientific classification
- Kingdom: Animalia
- Phylum: Mollusca
- Class: Gastropoda
- Subclass: Caenogastropoda
- Order: Neogastropoda
- Family: Muricidae
- Genus: Enixotrophon
- Species: E. arnaudi

Binomial name
- Enixotrophon arnaudi (Pastorino, 2002)

Synonyms
- Pagodula arnaudi (Pastorino, 2002); Trophon arnaudi Pastorino, 2002 (basionym)

= Enixotrophon arnaudi =

Species of gastropod

Enixotrophon arnaudi is a species of sea snail, a marine gastropod mollusk in the family Muricidae, the murex snails or rock snails.

== Description ==
The Enixotrophon arnaudi was originally discovered in 2002 by Guido Pastorino. The shell of the arnaudi is small, measuring approximately 13 mm in diameter. It is thin and chalky in texture, with a fusiform shape. The protoconch consists of 14 whorls, while the teleoconch has four and a half right-angled whorls. The spire constitutes about 1/5 of the total shell length. There is a short but clearly defined subsutural shelf. The spire angle is approximately 45-50°, with the suture abutting. The aperture is small and rounded, with a glossy white interior. The anterior siphonal canal is long and curved backwards. The umbilicus is closed. The outer lip is rounded and exhibits lirations from the spiral ornamentation. The columellar lip is narrow. The shell's axial ornamentation consists of regular, thin lamellae, with approximately 8-11 lamellae on the last whorl. These lamellae are moderately developed and extend along the whorl surface from the adapical suture to the base of the last whorl, projecting outwards along the periphery. The spiral ornamentation consists of rounded cords, which are slightly developed on the first whorls and increase to 4-5 on the last whorl. The whorls, cords, and lamellae are covered by regular growth lines. The operculum and shell ultrastructure of this species are currently unknown. The radula is rachiglossate, with a rachidian tooth that has a very thin central cusp. The lateral cusps are slightly shorter but have a similar thickness to the central cusp. There is a large denticle between the central and lateral cusps, rising from the base. The base of the rachidian teeth is curved, and there is a large, smooth marginal area. The lateral teeth are large and have a thick attached portion.

== Distribution ==
This marine species is found off the South Sandwich Islands.

== Etymology ==
This species is named in honor of Dr. Patrick Arnaud from Marseille, France for his significant contributions to Antarctic malacological studies.
