= Enixotrophon tenuirostratus =

Scientific classification
- Kingdom: Animalia
- Phylum: Mollusca
- Class: Gastropoda
- Subclass: Caenogastropoda
- Order: Neogastropoda
- Family: Muricidae
- Genus: Enixotrophon
- Species: E. tenuirostratus

Binomial name
- Enixotrophon tenuirostratus (Smith, 1899)

Synonyms
- Boreotrophon tenuirostratus (E. A. Smith, 1899); Pagodula tenuirostrata (E. A. Smith, 1899); Trophon tenuirostratus Smith, 1899 (original combination)

Species of gastropod

Enixotrophon tenuirostratus is a species of sea snail, a marine gastropod mollusk in the family Muricidae, the murex snails or rock snails.

== Distribution ==
This marine species occurs off the Andaman and Nicobar Islands.
