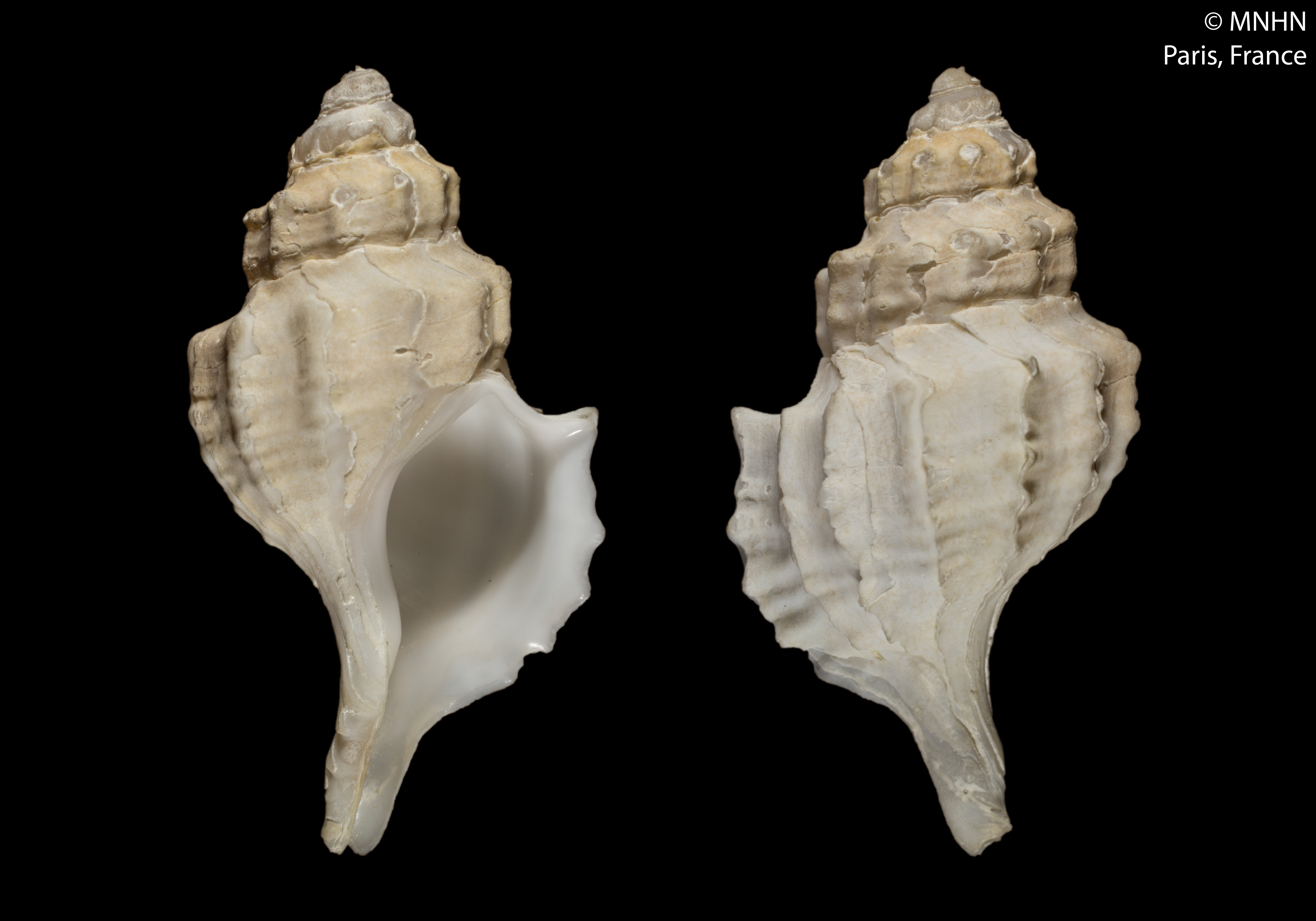
- Shell of Enixotrophon ceciliae (holotype at MNHN, Paris)

Scientific classification
- Kingdom: Animalia
- Phylum: Mollusca
- Class: Gastropoda
- Subclass: Caenogastropoda
- Order: Neogastropoda
- Family: Muricidae
- Genus: Enixotrophon
- Species: E. ceciliae

Binomial name
- Enixotrophon ceciliae (Houart, 2003)

Synonyms
- Pagodula ceciliae (Houart, 2003); Trophon ceciliae Houart, 2003

= Enixotrophon ceciliae =

Species of gastropod

Enixotrophon ceciliae is a species of sea snail, a marine gastropod mollusc in the family Muricidae, the murex snails or rock snails.

== Description ==
The shell is lightly built, lamellate, and reaches 61.4 mm in length at maturity. It has a high spire, with 6 or more broad, convex teleoconch whorls, and an impressed suture.

== Distribution ==
This species occurs in the Pacific Ocean off Chile at a depth of 1000 m.
