= Enixotrophon columbarioides =

Scientific classification
- Kingdom: Animalia
- Phylum: Mollusca
- Class: Gastropoda
- Subclass: Caenogastropoda
- Order: Neogastropoda
- Family: Muricidae
- Genus: Enixotrophon
- Species: E. columbarioides

Binomial name
- Enixotrophon columbarioides (Pastorino & Scarabino, 2008)

Synonyms
- Pagodula columbarioides (Pastorino & Scarabino, 2008); Trophon columbarioides Pastorino, 2008

Species of gastropod

Enixotrophon columbarioides is a species of sea snail, a marine gastropod mollusk in the family Muricidae, the murex snails or rock snails.
