= Pagodula aculeata =

Scientific classification
- Kingdom: Animalia
- Phylum: Mollusca
- Class: Gastropoda
- Subclass: Caenogastropoda
- Order: Neogastropoda
- Family: Muricidae
- Genus: Pagodula
- Species: P. aculeata

Binomial name
- Pagodula aculeata (Watson, 1882)

Synonyms
- Boreotrophon aculeatus (Watson, 1882); Trophon aculeatus Watson, 1882

Species of gastropod

Pagodula aculeata is a species of sea snail, a marine gastropod in the family Muricidae.
