= Enixotrophon acceptans =

Scientific classification
- Kingdom: Animalia
- Phylum: Mollusca
- Class: Gastropoda
- Subclass: Caenogastropoda
- Order: Neogastropoda
- Family: Muricidae
- Genus: Enixotrophon
- Species: E. acceptans

Binomial name
- Enixotrophon acceptans (Barnard, 1959)

Synonyms
- Pagodula acceptans (Barnard, 1959); Trophon acceptans Barnard, 1959

Species of gastropod

Enixotrophon acceptans is a species of sea snail, a marine gastropod mollusk in the family Muricidae, the murex snails or rock snails.
