= Enixotrophon planispinus =

Scientific classification
- Kingdom: Animalia
- Phylum: Mollusca
- Class: Gastropoda
- Subclass: Caenogastropoda
- Order: Neogastropoda
- Family: Muricidae
- Genus: Enixotrophon
- Species: E. planispinus

Binomial name
- Enixotrophon planispinus (E.A. Smith, 1906)

Synonyms
- Actinotrophon planispina (E. A. Smith, 1892); Pagodula planispina (E. A. Smith, 1892); Trophon planispina Smith, 1892 (original combination)

Species of gastropod

Enixotrophon planispinus is a species of sea snail, a marine gastropod mollusk in the family Muricidae, the murex snails or rock snails.
