= Enixotrophon concepcionensis =

Scientific classification
- Kingdom: Animalia
- Phylum: Mollusca
- Class: Gastropoda
- Subclass: Caenogastropoda
- Order: Neogastropoda
- Family: Muricidae
- Genus: Enixotrophon
- Species: E. concepcionensis

Binomial name
- Enixotrophon concepcionensis (Houart & Sellanes, 2006)

Synonyms
- Pagodula concepcionensis Houart & Sellanes, 2006; Trophon concepcionensis Houart & Sellanes, 2006

Species of gastropod

Enixotrophon concepcionensis is a species of sea snail, a marine gastropod mollusk in the family Muricidae, the murex snails or rock snails.
