= Enixotrophon poirieria =

Scientific classification
- Kingdom: Animalia
- Phylum: Mollusca
- Class: Gastropoda
- Subclass: Caenogastropoda
- Order: Neogastropoda
- Family: Muricidae
- Genus: Enixotrophon
- Species: E. poirieria

Binomial name
- Enixotrophon poirieria (Powell, 1951)

Synonyms
- Pagodula poirieria (Powell, 1951); Trophon poirieria Powell, 1951 (basionym)

Species of gastropod

Enixotrophon poirieria is a species of sea snail, a marine gastropod mollusk in the family Muricidae, the murex snails or rock snails.

== Description ==
Enixotrophon poirieria is characterized by its hard, coiled shell, which exhibits a distinctive pattern of spines and ridges that provide structural defense and camouflage. The shell typically exhibits a rough, spiny exterior, which is an adaptation to its environment, offering both protection and stability on rocky substrates.

The species is relatively small, with shell lengths varying depending on environmental conditions, typically with a length of around 16 mm. The coloration of the shell can range from pale to dark, often blending with the substrate to avoid predation.

== Distribution ==
This is a marine species occurs off the South Shetland Islands and the Antarctic Peninsula.
