= Enixotrophon araios =

Scientific classification
- Kingdom: Animalia
- Phylum: Mollusca
- Class: Gastropoda
- Subclass: Caenogastropoda
- Order: Neogastropoda
- Family: Muricidae
- Genus: Enixotrophon
- Species: E. araios

Binomial name
- Enixotrophon araios (Houart & Engl, 2007)

Synonyms
- Pagodula araios (Houart & Engl, 2007); Trophon araios Houart & Engl, 2007

Species of gastropod

Enixotrophon araios is a species of sea snail, a marine gastropod mollusk in the family Muricidae, the murex snails or rock snails.
