= Enixotrophon macquariensis =

Scientific classification
- Kingdom: Animalia
- Phylum: Mollusca
- Class: Gastropoda
- Subclass: Caenogastropoda
- Order: Neogastropoda
- Family: Muricidae
- Genus: Enixotrophon
- Species: E. macquariensis

Binomial name
- Enixotrophon macquariensis (Powell, 1957)

Synonyms
- Pagodula macquariensis (Powell, 1957); Trophon macquariensis Powell, 1957 (basionym)

Species of gastropod

Enixotrophon macquariensis is a species of sea snail, a marine gastropod mollusk in the family Muricidae, the murex snails or rock snails.

== Distribution ==
This marine species occurs off Macquarie Island .
