= Enixotrophon sansibaricus =

Scientific classification
- Kingdom: Animalia
- Phylum: Mollusca
- Class: Gastropoda
- Subclass: Caenogastropoda
- Order: Neogastropoda
- Family: Muricidae
- Genus: Enixotrophon
- Species: E. sansibaricus

Binomial name
- Enixotrophon sansibaricus (Thiele, 1925)

Synonyms
- Afritrophon sansibaricus (Thiele, 1925); Pagodula sansibarica (Thiele, 1925); Trophon sansibaricus Thiele, 1925

Species of gastropod

Enixotrophon sansibaricus is a species of sea snail, a marine gastropod mollusk in the family Muricidae, the murex snails or rock snails.

== Distribution ==
This marine species occurs off the Zanzibar Archipelago.
