= Enixotrophon plicilaminatus =

Scientific classification
- Kingdom: Animalia
- Phylum: Mollusca
- Class: Gastropoda
- Subclass: Caenogastropoda
- Order: Neogastropoda
- Family: Muricidae
- Genus: Enixotrophon
- Species: E. plicilaminatus

Binomial name
- Enixotrophon plicilaminatus (Verco, 1909)

Synonyms
- Apixystus plicilaminatus (Verco, 1909); Pagodula plicilaminata (Verco, 1909); Trophon plicilaminatus Verco, 1909(original combination); Trophonopsis plicilaminatus (Verco, 1909)

Species of gastropod

Enixotrophon plicilaminatus is a species of sea snail, a marine gastropod mollusk in the family Muricidae, the murex snails or rock snails.

== Distribution ==
This marine species occurs off South Australia.
