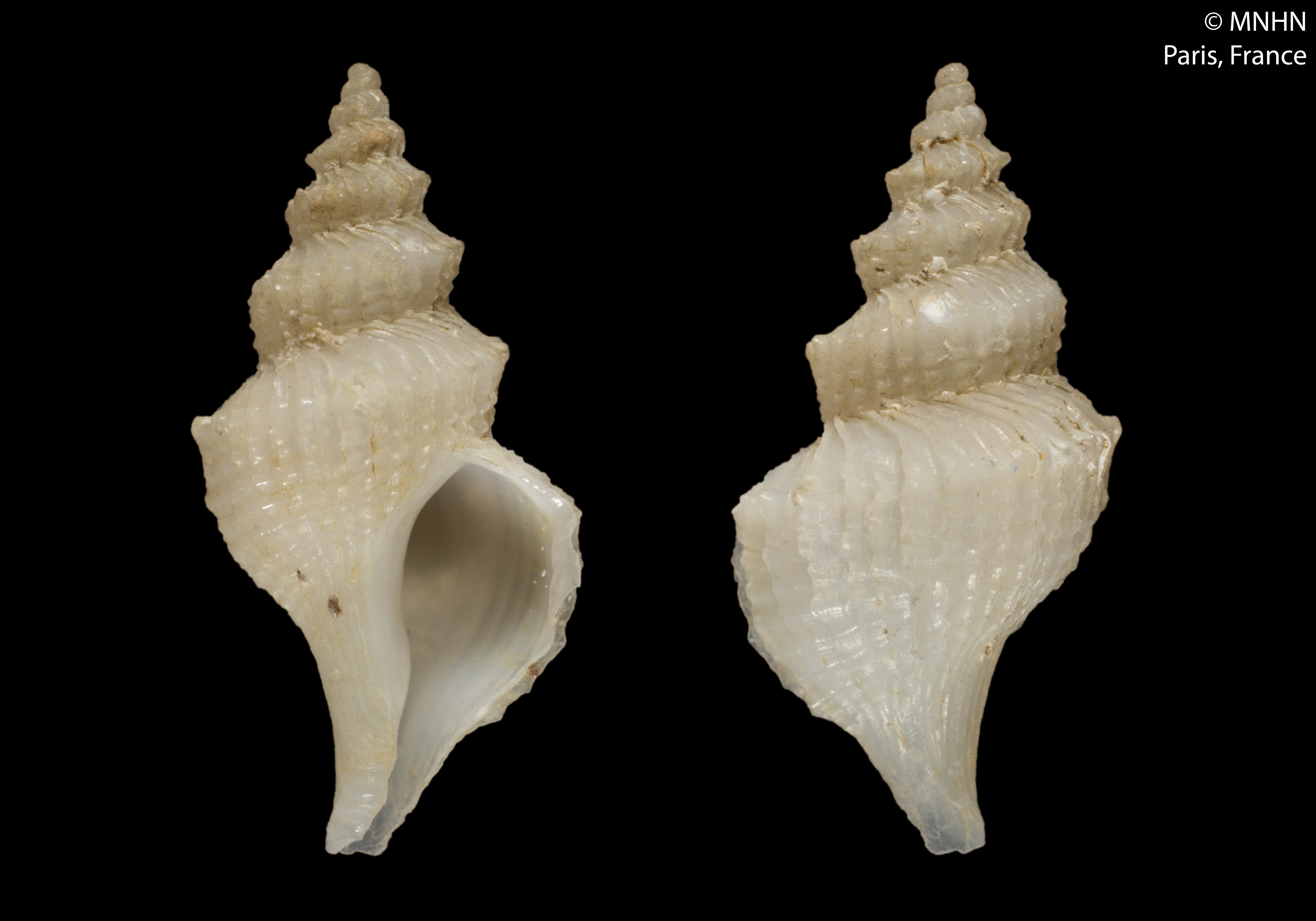
- Shell of Enixotrophon multigradus (paratype at MNHN, Paris)

Scientific classification
- Kingdom: Animalia
- Phylum: Mollusca
- Class: Gastropoda
- Subclass: Caenogastropoda
- Order: Neogastropoda
- Family: Muricidae
- Genus: Enixotrophon
- Species: E. multigradus

Binomial name
- Enixotrophon multigradus (Houart, 1990)

Synonyms
- Pagodula multigrada (Houart, 1990); Trophon multigradus Houart, 1990 (original combination); Trophonopsis multigradus (Houart, 1990)

= Enixotrophon multigradus =

Species of gastropod

Enixotrophon multigradus is a species of sea snail, a marine gastropod mollusk in the family Muricidae, the murex snails or rock snails.

== Distribution ==
This marine species occurs off New Caledonia.
