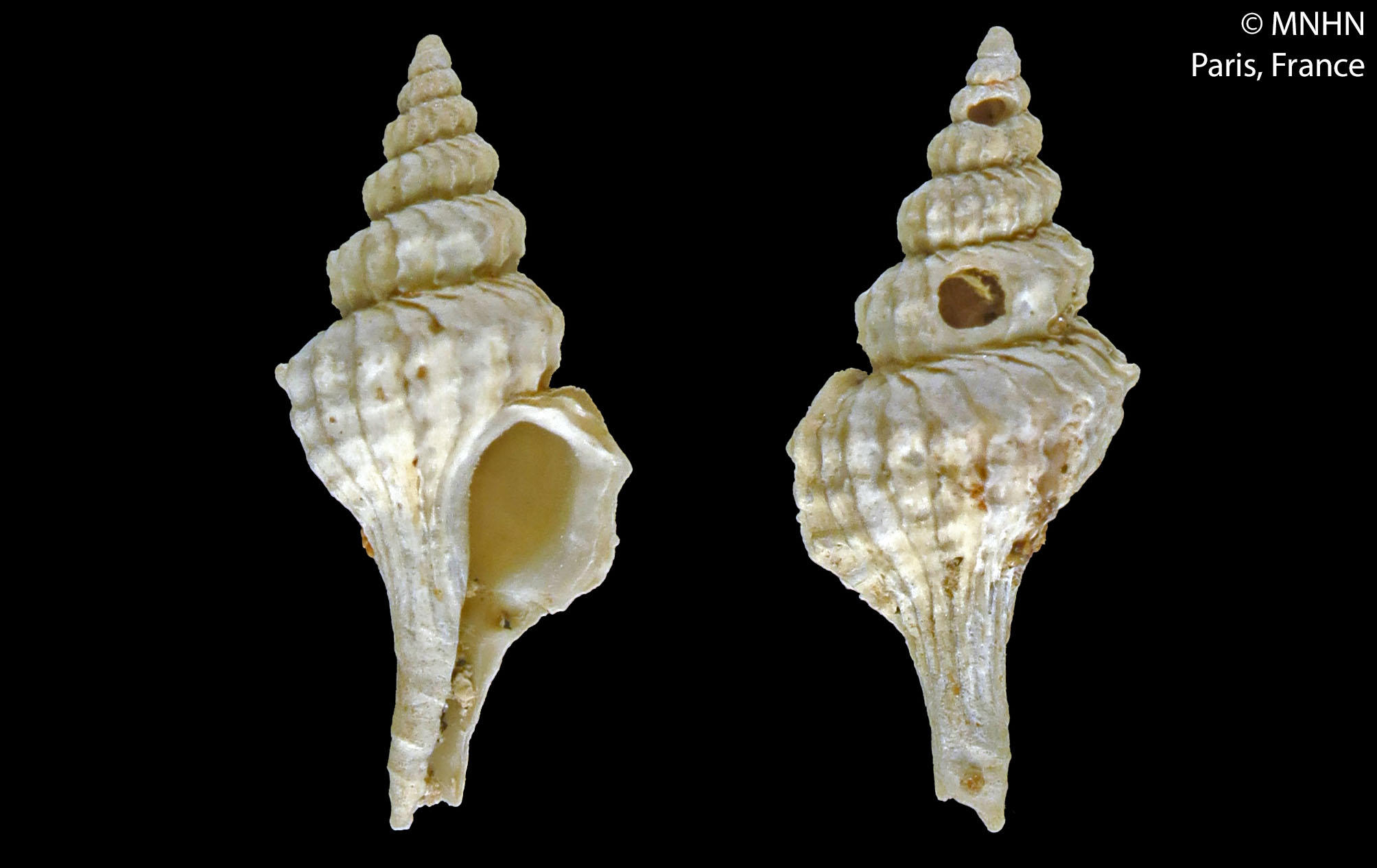
- Shell of Enixotrophon pulchellus (specimen at MNHN, Paris)

Scientific classification
- Kingdom: Animalia
- Phylum: Mollusca
- Class: Gastropoda
- Subclass: Caenogastropoda
- Order: Neogastropoda
- Family: Muricidae
- Genus: Enixotrophon
- Species: E. pulchellus

Binomial name
- Enixotrophon pulchellus (Schepman, 1911)

Synonyms
- Enixotrophon johannthielei (Barnard, 1959); Enixotrophon ziczac (Tiba, 1981); Pagodula pulchella (Schepman, 1911); Pagodula ziczac (Tiba, 1981); Trophon johannthielei Barnard, 1959 junior subjective synonym; Trophon pulchellus Schepman, 1911 (original combination); Trophonopsis ziczac Tiba, 1981 junior subjective synonym

= Enixotrophon pulchellus =

Species of gastropod

Enixotrophon pulchellus is a species of sea snail, a marine gastropod mollusk in the family Muricidae, the murex snails or rock snails.

== Description ==
(Original description) The fusiform shell is thin, and white, and has a moderately long spire. It has seven whorls, of which about one and a half smooth, convex whorls form the protoconch. The subsequent whorls are convex, angled above the middle, convexly declining above the angle, and contracted toward the deep suture.

The sculpture consists of fine laminate varices, 14–16 on the body whorl. These are simple above the angle, where they form free laminae; at the angle, they form open spines that are directed outward and are slightly upturned. Below the angle, there are two rather obtuse lirae on the upper whorls and five or six on the body whorl. As they are crossed, the laminae bear short spines, which decrease to scales near the base of the body whorl.

The siphonal canal is moderately long and has nearly straight lamellae corresponding to those of the body whorl. The aperture is triangularly rounded; its upper margin is convex, and its outer margin is slightly thickened at some distance from the thin rim. The columellar margin is enamelled and appressed, and the siphonal canal is open.

== Distribution ==
This marine species occurs off Papua New Guinea; also in the Halmahera Sea, Indonesia.
