= Enixotrophon carduelis =

Scientific classification
- Kingdom: Animalia
- Phylum: Mollusca
- Class: Gastropoda
- Subclass: Caenogastropoda
- Order: Neogastropoda
- Family: Muricidae
- Genus: Enixotrophon
- Species: E. carduelis

Binomial name
- Enixotrophon carduelis (Watson, 1882)

Synonyms
- Pagodula carduelis (R. B. Watson, 1882); Trophon carduelis Watson, 1882; Trophonopsis carduelis (Watson, 1882)

Species of gastropod

Enixotrophon carduelis is a species of sea snail, a marine gastropod mollusk in the family Muricidae, the murex snails or rock snails.

== Distribution ==
This marine species occurs off New Zealand and in the Australian part of the Tasman Sea.
