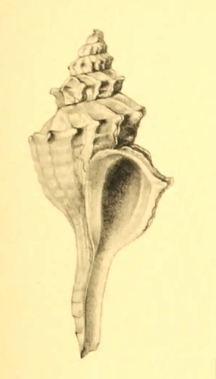
- Original drawing of a shell of Enixotrophon obtuseliratus

Scientific classification
- Kingdom: Animalia
- Phylum: Mollusca
- Class: Gastropoda
- Subclass: Caenogastropoda
- Order: Neogastropoda
- Family: Muricidae
- Genus: Enixotrophon
- Species: E. obtuseliratus

Binomial name
- Enixotrophon obtuseliratus (Schepman, 1911)

Synonyms
- Pagodula obtuselirata (Schepman, 1911) (superseded combination); Trophon obtuseliratus Schepman, 1911; Trophonopsis obtuselirata (Schepman, 1911) (superseded combination)

= Enixotrophon obtuseliratus =

Species of gastropod

Enixotrophon obtuseliratus is a species of sea snail, a marine gastropod mollusk in the family Muricidae, the murex snails or rock snails.

== Description ==
The shell measures 34 mm in height and 14 mm in width; the aperture, including the canal, measures 21 mm in height and 7 mm in width.

(Original description) The shell is club-shaped, with a rather long spire and a slender siphonal canal. It is white, thin, and rather smooth. It has six or seven whorls, of which about one and a half whorls in the protoconch form a smooth, convex apex. The subsequent whorls are convex and are separated by a conspicuous but shallow suture; on the upper whorls they are angular about the middle, decline obliquely from the suture to the angle, become nearly straight below the angle, and narrow somewhat toward the lower suture.

The varices are laminar, and there are 12 on the body whorl. Each varix bears a hollow spine at the angle, and the spine is slightly directed upward. The body whorl bears about six obtuse spiral lirae, of which the uppermost, at the angle, unites the spines, while the others make the margin of the varices undulate; two or three lirae are visible on the upper whorls. The aperture is ovate, with an arched, thin peristome that is slightly thickened on the inside and smooth and white within. The columellar margin bears a thin, appressed layer of enamel. The siphonal canal is long, directed toward the right, and sculptured by the continuation of the varices.

== Distribution ==
This species occurs in the Flores Sea, Indonesia.
