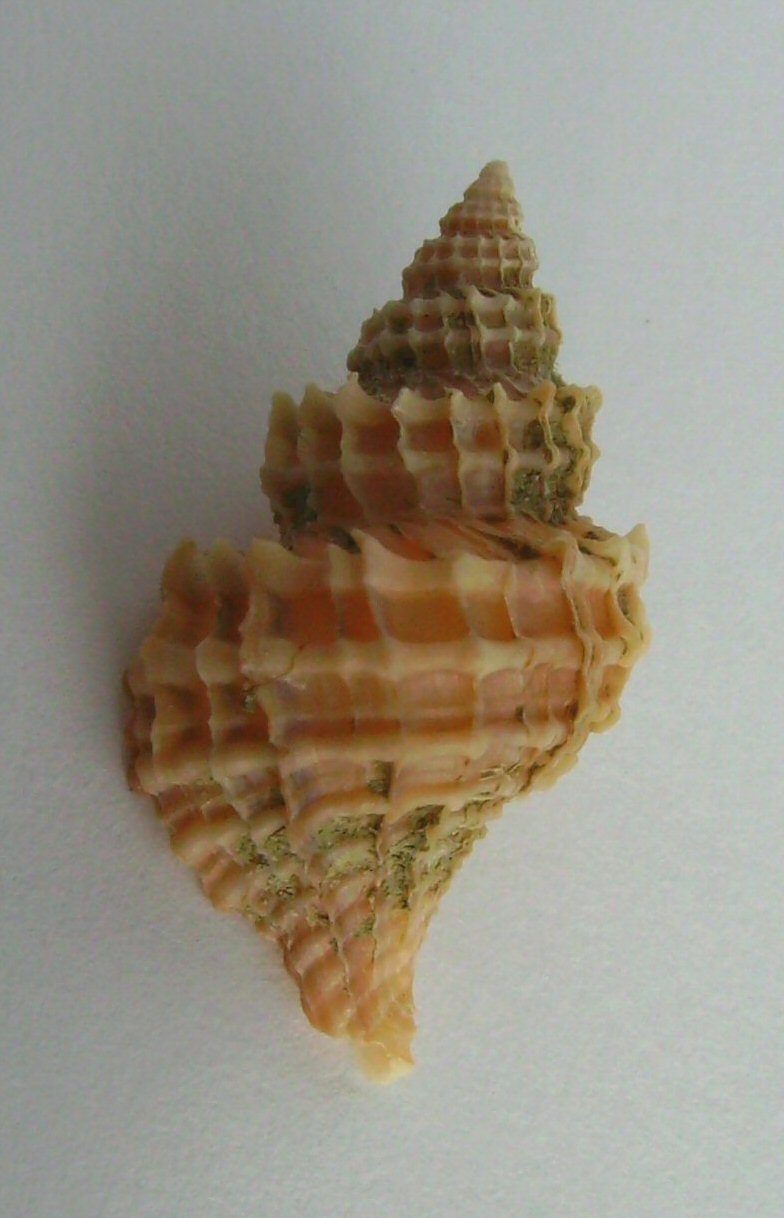
- Shell of Zeatrophon ambiguus

Scientific classification
- Kingdom: Animalia
- Phylum: Mollusca
- Class: Gastropoda
- Subclass: Caenogastropoda
- Order: Neogastropoda
- Superfamily: Muricoidea
- Family: Muricidae
- Subfamily: Pagodulinae; Barco, Schiaparelli, Houart & Oliverio, 2012

Genera
- See text

= Pagodulinae =

Subfamily of gastropods

Pagodulinae is a taxonomic subfamily of predatory sea snails, marine gastropod mollusks in the family Muricidae, the murex shells or rock shells.

The genera in this family were previously grouped in a larger subfamily, the Trophoninae.

== Genera ==
Genera within the subfamily Pagodulinae include:

- Abyssotrophon Egorov, 1993
- Actinotrophon Dall, 1902
- Axymene Finlay, 1926
- Boreotrophon P. Fischer, 1884
- Comptella Finlay, 1926
- Enixotrophon Iredale, 1929
- Lamellitrophon B. A. Marshall & Houart, 2022
- Lenitrophon Finlay, 1926 (belongs to the subfamily [unassigned] Muricidae)
- Nodulotrophon T. Habe & Ki. Ito, 1965
- Pagodula Monterosato, 1884
- Paratrophon Finlay, 1926
- Paziella Jousseaume, 1880
- † Peritrophon Marwick, 1931
- Poirieria Jousseaume, 1880
- Terefundus Finlay, 1926
- Trophonella Harasewych & Pastorino, 2010
- Trophonopsis Bucquoy, Dautzenberg & Dollfus, 1882
- † Vesanula Finlay, 1926
- Xymene Iredale, 1915
- Xymenella Finlay, 1926
- Xymenopsis Powell, 1951
- Zeatrophon Finlay, 1926

Genera brought into synonymy

- Chalmon de Gregorio, 1885: synonym of Trophonopsis Bucquoy, Dautzenberg & Dollfus, 1882
- Houartiella Smriglio, Mariottini & Bonfitto, 1997: synonym of Trophonopsis Bucquoy, Dautzenberg & Dollfus, 1882
- Pinon de Gregorio, 1885: synonym of Pagodula Monterosato, 1884
