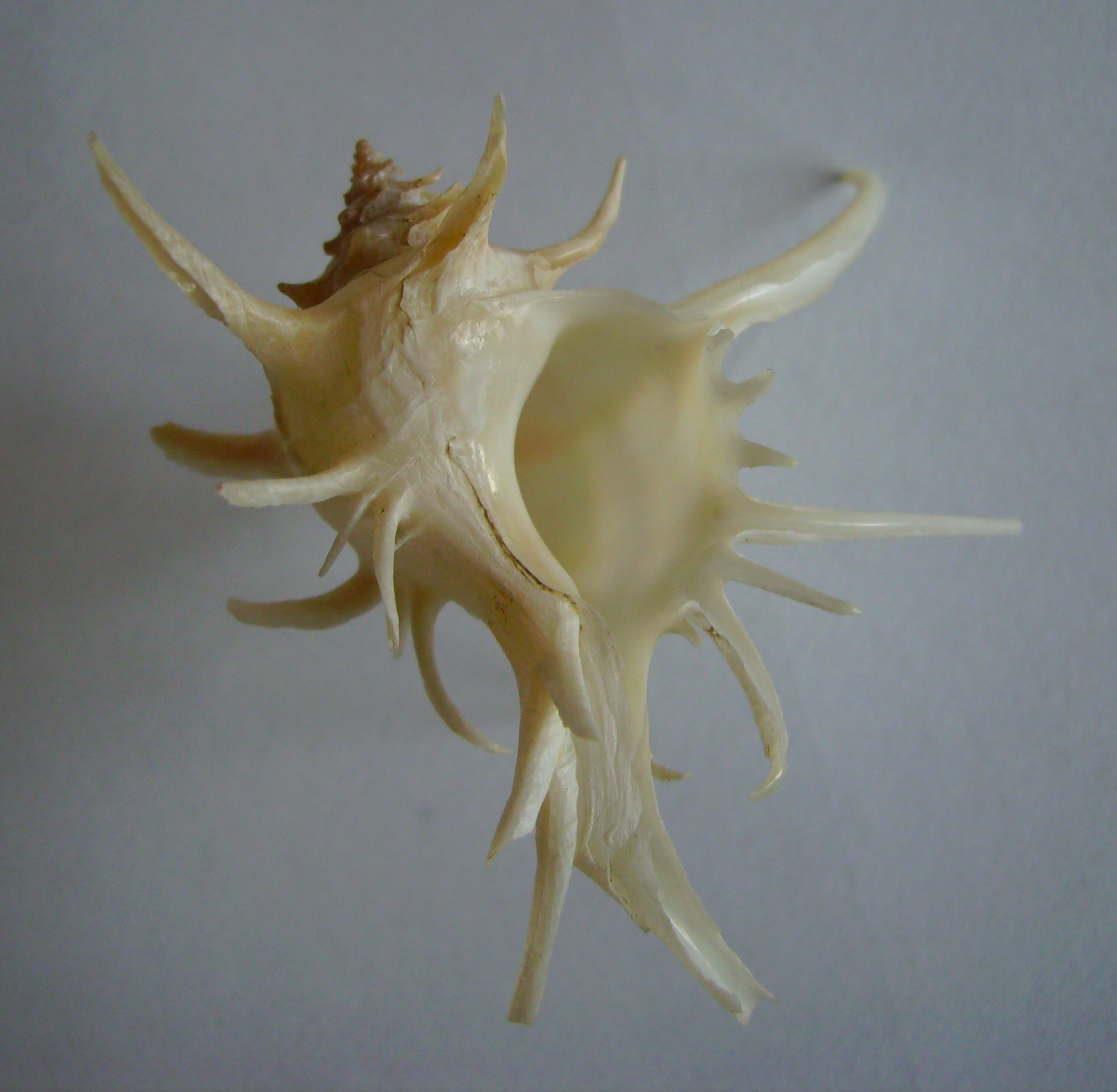
- Apertural view of a shell of Poirieria zelandica

Scientific classification
- Kingdom: Animalia
- Phylum: Mollusca
- Class: Gastropoda
- Subclass: Caenogastropoda
- Order: Neogastropoda
- Superfamily: Muricoidea
- Family: Muricidae
- Subfamily: Pagodulinae
- Genus: Poirieria; Jousseaume, 1880

Type species
- Murex zelandicus Quoy & Gaimard, 1833

Species
- See text.

Synonyms
- Bathymurex Clench & Farfante, 1945; Dallimurex Rehder, 1946; Paziella Jousseaume, 1880

= Poirieria =

Genus of gastropods

Poirieria is a genus of large predatory sea snails, marine gastropod molluscs in the subfamily Pagodulinae of the family Muricidae, the rock snails.

== Species ==
Species within the genus Poirieria include:

- † Poirieria delli P. A. Maxwell, 1971
- † Poirieria denticulifera P. A. Maxwell, 1971
- Poirieria kopua Dell, 1956
- † Poirieria parva P. A. Maxwell, 1971
- † Poirieria primigena Finlay, 1930
- Poirieria syrinx Marshall & Houart, 1995
- Poirieria zelandica (Quoy & Gaimard, 1833)

Synonymized species

- Poirieria actinophora (Dall, 1889):: synonym of Actinotrophon actinophorus (Dall, 1889)
- Poirieria azami Kuroda, 1929: synonym of Murexsul multispinosus (G. B. Sowerby III, 1904)
- Poirieria bowdenensis E. H. Vokes, 1970 : synonym of Pazinotus bowdenensis (Vokes, 1970)
- Poirieria fragilis Houart, 1996:: synonym of Actinotrophon fragilis (Houart, 1996)
- Poirieria kurranulla Garrard, 1961: synonym of Chicoreus longicornis (Dunker, 1864)
- Poirieria stimpsonii (Dall, 1889) : synonym of Pazinotus stimpsonii (Dall, 1889)
- Poirieria tenuis Houart, 2001:: synonym of Actinotrophon tenuis (Houart, 2001)
- Poirieria velero Vokes, 1970: synonym of Calotrophon velero (Vokes, 1970) (original combination)
- Poirieria (Panamurex) carnicolor (Clench & Pérez Farfante, 1945) : synonym of Calotrophon carnicolor (Clench & Pérez Farfante, 1945)
- Poirieria (Panamurex) eugeniae Vokes, 1992 : synonym of Calotrophon eugeniae (Vokes, 1992)
- Poirieria (Paziella) acerapex Houart, 1986 : synonym of Leptotrophon acerapex (Houart, 1986)
- Poirieria (Paziella) atlantis (Clench & Farfante, 1945) : synonym of Paziella atlantis (Clench & Farfante, 1945)
- Poirieria (Paziella) galapagana (Emerson & D'Attilio, 1970) : synonym of Paziella galapagana (Emerson & D'Attilio, 1970)
- Poirieria (Paziella) nuttingi (Dall, 1896) : synonym of Paziella nuttingi (Dall, 1896)
- Poirieria (Paziella) oregonia (Bullis, 1964) : synonym of Paziella oregonia (Bullis, 1964)
- Poirieria (Paziella) pazi (Crosse, 1869) : synonym of Paziella pazi (Crosse, 1869)
- Poirieria (Paziella) petuchi Vokes, 1992 : synonym of Paziella petuchi (Vokes, 1992)
- Poirieria (Paziella) spinacutus Houart, 1986 : synonym of Leptotrophon spinacutus (Houart, 1986)
- Poirieria (Paziella) tanaoa Houart & Tröndlé, 2008 : synonym of Paziella tanaoa (Houart & Tröndlé, 2008)
- Poirieria (Paziella) vaubanensis Houart, 1986 : synonym of Bouchetia vaubanensis (Houart, 1986)
- Poirieria (Pazinotus) bodarti Costa, 1993: synonym of Pazinotus bodarti (Costa, 1993)
