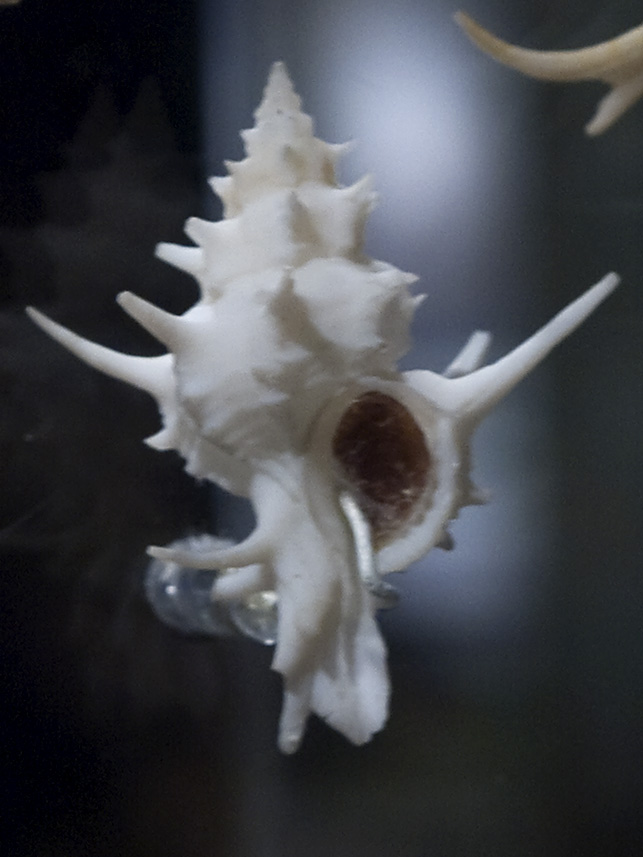
- Paziella pazi shell

Scientific classification
- Kingdom: Animalia
- Phylum: Mollusca
- Class: Gastropoda
- Subclass: Caenogastropoda
- Order: Neogastropoda
- Superfamily: Muricoidea
- Family: Muricidae
- Subfamily: Muricinae
- Genus: Paziella; Jousseaume, 1880

Type species
- Murex pazi Crosse, 1869

Synonyms
- Bathymurex Clench & Pérez Farfante, 1945; Dallimurex Rehder, 1946; Murex (Bathymurex); Paziella (Paziella) Jousseaume, 1880· accepted, alternate representation; Poirieria (Paziella) Jousseaume, 1880

= Paziella =

Genus of gastropods

Paziella is a genus of sea snails, marine gastropod mollusks in the subfamily Muricinae of the family Muricidae, the murex snails or rock snails.

== Description ==
The biconic, medium-sized shell has its varices dissected into spines. The aperture is ovoid and smooth inside. The anal sinus is almost closed. The columella is smooth.

This Caribbean genus is closely related to Poirieria from the Indo-Pacific region.

== Species ==
Species within the genus Paziella include:

- Paziella atlantis (Clench & Farfante, 1945)
- Paziella galapagana (Emerson & D'Attilio, 1970)
- † Paziella gallica Landau, Merle, Ceulemans & Van Dingenen, 2019
- † Paziella gracilenta Landau, Merle, Ceulemans & Van Dingenen, 2019
- † Paziella modesta Vicián, Kovács & Stein, 2019
- Paziella nuttingi (Dall, 1896)
- Paziella oregonia (Bullis, 1964)
- † Paziella parveenae Merle & Pacaud, 2019
- Paziella pazi (Crosse, 1869)
- Paziella petuchi (Vokes, 1992)
- Paziella tanaoa (Houart & Tröndlé, 2008)

Species brought into synonymy

- Paziella hystricina (Dall, 1889): synonym of Bouchetia hystricina (Dall, 1889)
- Paziella oliverai (Kosuge, 1984): synonym of Flexopteron oliverai (Kosuge, 1984)
- † Paziella philippinensis (Shuto, 1969): synonym of † Flexopteron philippinensis Shuto, 1969
- Paziella poppei (Houart, 1993): synonym of Flexopteron poppei (Houart, 1993)
- Paziella primanova (Houart, 1985): synonym of Flexopteron primanova (Houart, 1985)
- Paziella vaubanensis (Houart, 1986): synonym of Bouchetia vaubanensis (Houart, 1986)
