= P. spectabilis =

P. spectabilis may refer to:

- Pazinotus spectabilis, a sea snail species
- Penstemon spectabilis, a flowering plant species
- Phasmahyla spectabilis, a frog species
- Pimelea spectabilis, a shrub species
- Pitcairnia spectabilis, a flowering plant species
- Polygrammodes spectabilis, a moth species

== Synonyms ==
- Pachyne spectabilis, a synonym of Phaius tancarvilleae, an orchid species
- Phrynopus spectabilis, a synonym of Pleurodema marmoratum, a frog species
- Poecilichthys spectabilis, a synonym of Etheostoma spectabile, the orangethroat darter, a fish species
