= Vehicle registration plates of Palau =

Palau
- Country: Palau
- Country code: None

Current series
- Size: 300 x 152 mm
- Material: Metal

Palau requires its residents to register their motor vehicles and display vehicle registration plates. Current plates are North American standard 6 × 12 inches (152 × 305 mm). Most states issue metal plates, some stamped; however, some are hand painted, stencilled or of printed laminated paper on a wooden base. Most states issue new plates every few years, others use revalidation through stickers.

The designs of the plates vary by state, with each state issuing their own plates, although some states have less than 100 residents and the largest just 14,000. Palau witnessed several instances of political violence in the 1980s, due to state-by-state conflict over the nuclear issue, so in the 1990s a national plate was issued. This has since reverted to state-by-state production.

== Regular plates ==
Image	First issued	Design	Slogan	Serial format	Serials issued	Notes
		Two bai (men's meeting houses)	"Charm of Micronesia"			Republic of Palau
	1980					Airai Japanese manufacture
	1980	Two bai (men's meeting houses)				Koror
	1988	State seal				Ngarchelong plexiglass
	1990s	Offshore natural arch	Spelled "NGAREMLENGUI"			Ngeremlengui
	1990s	State seal				Ngatpang plexiglass
	1992	Two bai (men's meeting houses)	"Charm of Micronesia"			Republic of Palau
	2000	Sprouting coconut seed and green crab				Ngatpang Australian standard 372 mm × 134 mm
	2000	State seal, spiny murex, sea turtle and outrigger	"LAND OF ENCHANTMENT"			Peleliu
	2001	Outrigger and four stars in a map pattern				Sonsorol
	2002	Storm petrel and state seal				Ngchesar
	2004		"HIGHEST & TALLEST"			Ngardmau plexiglass
	2005	Spiny murex	"HOME OF MEDECHII BELAU" (according to legend, Medechii Belau lured rabbitfish to Airai)			Airai
	2005	State seal				Kayangel
	2005	State seal	"LAND OF ENCHANTMENT"			Peleliu
	2007	State seal				Ngaraard
	2008	Three bai (men's meeting houses)				Koror
	2008	Flag of Melekeok				Melekeok
	2009	Taki Falls scenic waterfall				Ngardmau
	2010					Angaur
	2010					Hatohobei-hand-stenciled; with only 40 residents, only government plates are produced
	2011	Bai (men's meeting house) and saltwater crocodile				Aimeliik-printed laminated paper
	2012	Sprouting coconut seed and red green crab				Ngatpang
	2013	Two bai (men's meeting houses)				Koror
	2013	State seal	"CHAD RA KIULUUL" (Kiuluul is an old name for Ngiwal)			Ngiwal
	2018	State seal and Taki Falls scenic waterfall				Ngardmau
	2019	Flag of Melekeok				Melekeok
	2019	Black numbers on white background all centered in a black bordered box; green plate background with stars at top and banner at bottom				Ngchesar
	2020	Bai (men's meeting house) and saltwater crocodile				Aimeliik
	2020 (?)	Dark green serial at far right on light mint green background; "ASGV" diagonally in center	State seal at center left			Aimeliik
	2020	Spiny murex	"HOME OF MEDECHII BELAU"			Airai
	2020	Blue text on white background with small blue bands at top and bottom				Angaur
	2020	State seal				Kayangel
	2020	Two bai (men's meeting houses)	"BOUNTIFUL ISLES"			Koror
	2020	Black serial on white background	"BOUNTIFUL ISLES"			Koror
	2020 (?)	State seal				Ngaraard
	2020	State seal				Ngarchelong
	2020	Sprouting coconut seed and red green crab				Ngatpang
	2020 (?)	Yellow serial on blue background; "Ngeremlengui State" and "Republic of Palau" in white at top and bottom respectively				Ngeremlengui
	2020	State seal	"CHAD RA KIULUUL" (Kiuluul is an old name for Ngiwal)	K79-123		Ngiwal
	2020	Black letters on sky blue background	"ODESNAGEL PRIDE"			Peleliu

== Diplomatic plates ==
Image	First issued	Design	Slogan	Serial format	Serials issued	Notes
	2020 (?)	Golden yellow serial on light blue background; wavy golden yell and light blue border	golden yellow "DIPLOMAT" above serial number	A 123		Republic of Palau

== Government plates ==
Image	First issued	Design	Slogan	Serial format	Serials issued	Notes
	2019	White numbers on orange background; bai (men's meeting house) left, flag right	White "GOVERNMENT" above serial number	1234		Republic of Palau
	2020	Light blue serial on silver background; light blue border; scale of justice to right of serial and flag to right	Blue "JUDICIARY" above serial number	123		Republic of Palau

== Special plates ==
Image	First issued	Design	Slogan	Serial format	Serials issued	Notes
		Black serial on white background; Belau National Museum centered at top; "Republic of Palau centered at bottom; material is plastic	A Cherechar a Lokelii	BNM-1234		Koror
	2020 (?)	Large black "LGSP" (Local Government Support Program) on white background skewed to right of center; United Nations Development Program logo over state seal at left; material is plastic	None			Republic of Palau
	2020	Black serial on white background preceded by yellow and blue PICRC logo; material is plastic	Palau International Coral Reef Center	PICRC-12		Koror
