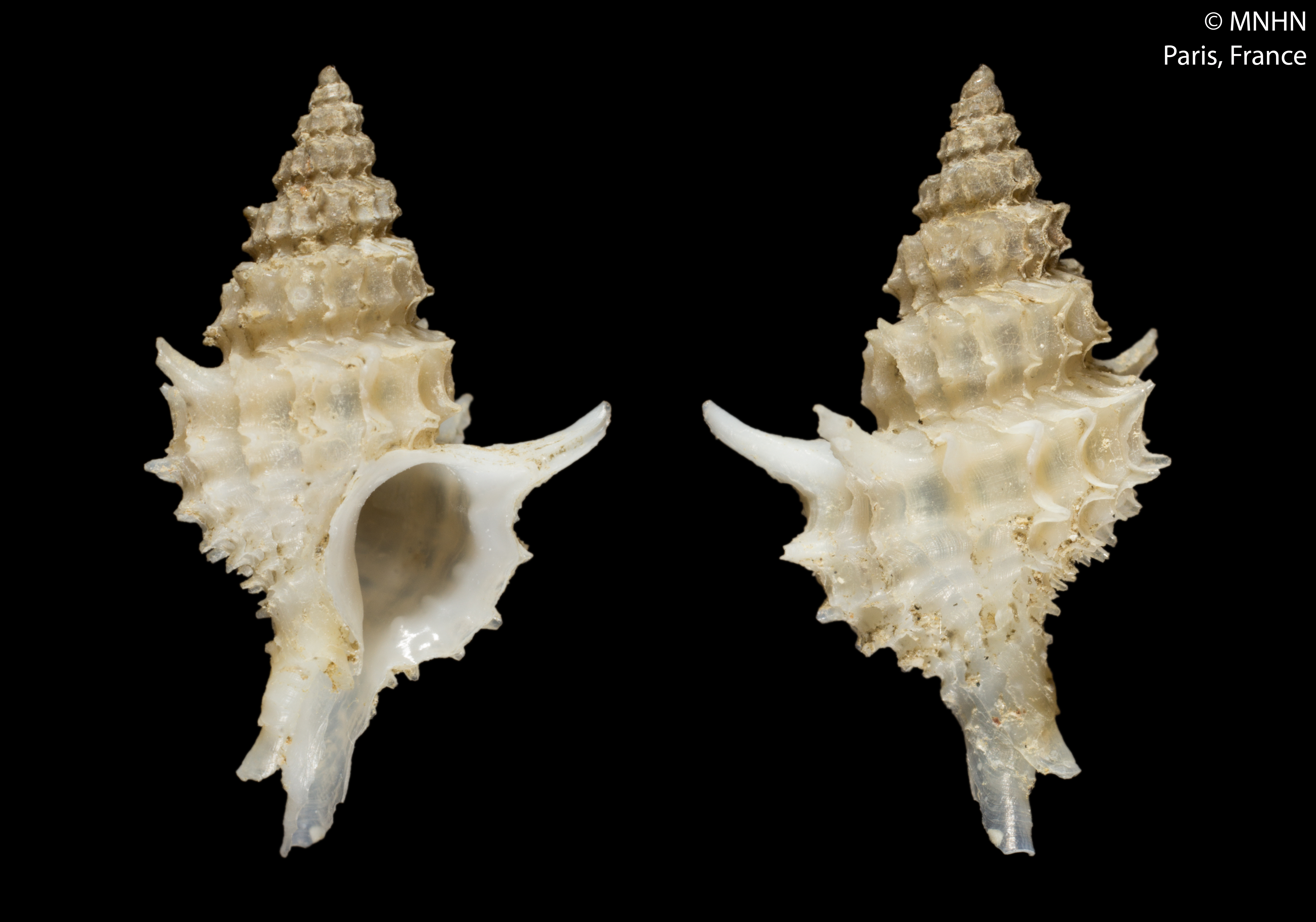
- Shell of Bouchetia wareni (holotype at MNHN, Paris)

Scientific classification
- Kingdom: Animalia
- Phylum: Mollusca
- Class: Gastropoda
- Subclass: Caenogastropoda
- Order: Neogastropoda
- Family: Muricidae
- Subfamily: Muricinae
- Genus: Bouchetia; Houart & Héros, 2008

Type species
- Poirieria (Paziella) vaubanensis Houart, 1986

Synonyms
- Paziella (Bouchetia) Houart & Héros, 2008

= Bouchetia (gastropod) =

Genus of gastropods

Bouchetia is a genus of sea snails, marine gastropod molluscs in the family Muricidae, the murex snails or rock snails.

This genus was named after the malacologist Philippe Bouchet. It has become a synonym of Paziella (Bouchetia) Houart & Héros, 2008, itself an alternate representation of Paziella Jousseaume, 1880

== Species ==
Species within the genus Bouchetia included :

- Bouchetia hystricina (Dall, 1889): s
- Bouchetia vaubanensis (Houart, 1986):
- Bouchetia wareni Houart & Héros, 2015
