= Calotrophon hystrix =

Scientific classification
- Kingdom: Animalia
- Phylum: Mollusca
- Class: Gastropoda
- Subclass: Caenogastropoda
- Order: Neogastropoda
- Family: Muricidae
- Genus: Calotrophon
- Species: C. hystrix

Binomial name
- Calotrophon hystrix Garcia, 2006

Species of gastropod

Calotrophon hystrix is a species of sea snail, a marine gastropod mollusk in the family Muricidae, the murex snails or rock snails.
