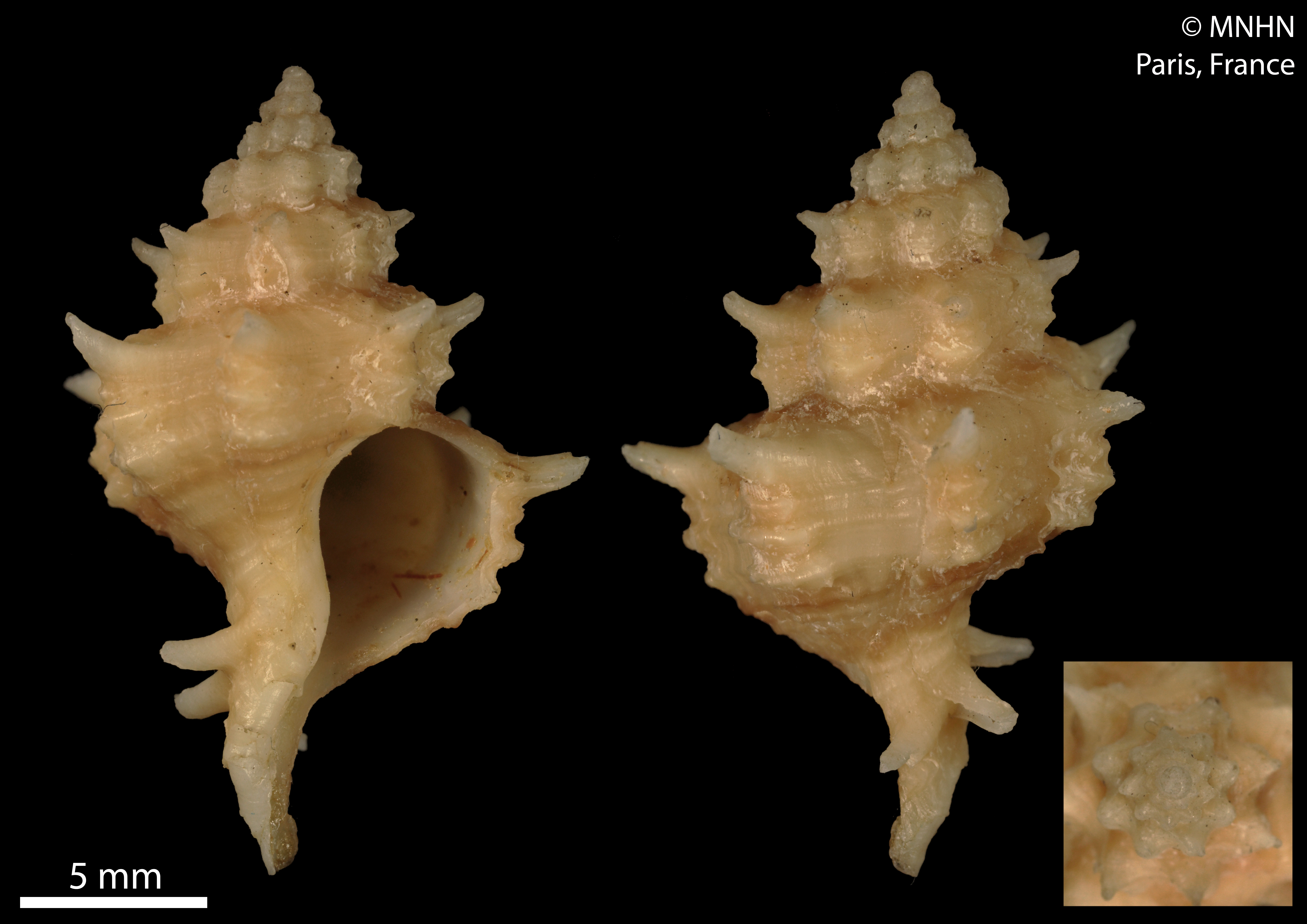
- Shell of Calotrophon carnicolor (specimen at MNHN, Paris)

Scientific classification
- Kingdom: Animalia
- Phylum: Mollusca
- Class: Gastropoda
- Subclass: Caenogastropoda
- Order: Neogastropoda
- Superfamily: Muricoidea
- Family: Muricidae
- Subfamily: Muricinae
- Genus: Calotrophon; Hertlein & Strong, 1951

Synonyms
- Calotrophon (Calotrophon) Hertlein & A. M. Strong, 1951· accepted, alternate representation; Calotrophon (Panamurex) Woodring, 1959· accepted, alternate representation; Hertleinella Berry, 1958; Panamurex Woodring, 1959; Poirieria (Panamurex) Woodring, 1959; Pseudosalpinx Olsson & Harbison, 1953

= Calotrophon =

Genus of gastropods

Calotrophon is a genus of sea snails, marine gastropod mollusks in the family Muricidae, the murex snails or rock snails.

== Species ==
Species within the genus Calotrophon include:

- Calotrophon andrewsi Vokes, 1976
- Calotrophon carnicolor (Clench & Pérez Farfante, 1945)
- Calotrophon eugeniae (Vokes, 1992)
- Calotrophon gatunensis (Brown & Pilsbry, 1911)
- Calotrophon hemmenorum (Houart & Mühlhäusser, 1990)
- Calotrophon hystrix Garcia, 2006
- Calotrophon ostrearum (Conrad, 1846)
- Calotrophon turritus (Dall, 1919)
- Calotrophon velero (Vokes, 1970)

Species brought into synonymy

- Calotrophon bristolae Hertlein & Strong, 1951: synonym of Calotrophon turritus (Dall, 1919)
- Calotrophon emilyae Petuch, 1988 †: synonym of Calotrophon ostrearum (Conrad, 1846)
