= Poirieria primigena =

Scientific classification
- Kingdom: Animalia
- Phylum: Mollusca
- Class: Gastropoda
- Subclass: Caenogastropoda
- Order: Neogastropoda
- Superfamily: Muricoidea
- Family: Muricidae
- Subfamily: Pagodulinae
- Genus: Poirieria
- Species: †P. primigena

Binomial name
- †Poirieria primigena Finlay, 1930

Extinct species of gastropod

Poirieria primigena is an extinct species of sea snail, a marine gastropod mollusk, in the family Muricidae, the murex snails or rock snails.

== Distribution ==
This species occurred in New Zealand.
