= Calotrophon hemmenorum =

Scientific classification
- Kingdom: Animalia
- Phylum: Mollusca
- Class: Gastropoda
- Subclass: Caenogastropoda
- Order: Neogastropoda
- Family: Muricidae
- Genus: Calotrophon
- Species: C. hemmenorum

Binomial name
- Calotrophon hemmenorum (Houart & Muhlhausser, 1990)

Synonyms
- Calotrophon (Panamurex) hemmenorum (Houart & Mühlhäusser, 1990); Poirieria (Panamurex) hemmenorum Houart & Mühlhäusser, 1990

Species of gastropod

Calotrophon hemmenorum is a species of sea snail, a marine gastropod mollusk in the family Muricidae, the murex snails or rock snails.

== Description ==
The adult shell attains a length of 20 mm.

== Distribution ==
This species is distributed in the Indian Ocean along Somalia.
