= Pazinotus falcatiformis =

Scientific classification
- Kingdom: Animalia
- Phylum: Mollusca
- Class: Gastropoda
- Subclass: Caenogastropoda
- Order: Neogastropoda
- Family: Muricidae
- Genus: Pazinotus
- Species: P. falcatiformis

Binomial name
- Pazinotus falcatiformis (Thiele, 1925)

Synonyms
- Murex falcatiformis Thiele, 1925

Species of gastropod

Pazinotus falcatiformis is a species of sea snail, a marine gastropod mollusk in the family Muricidae, the murex snails or rock snails.
