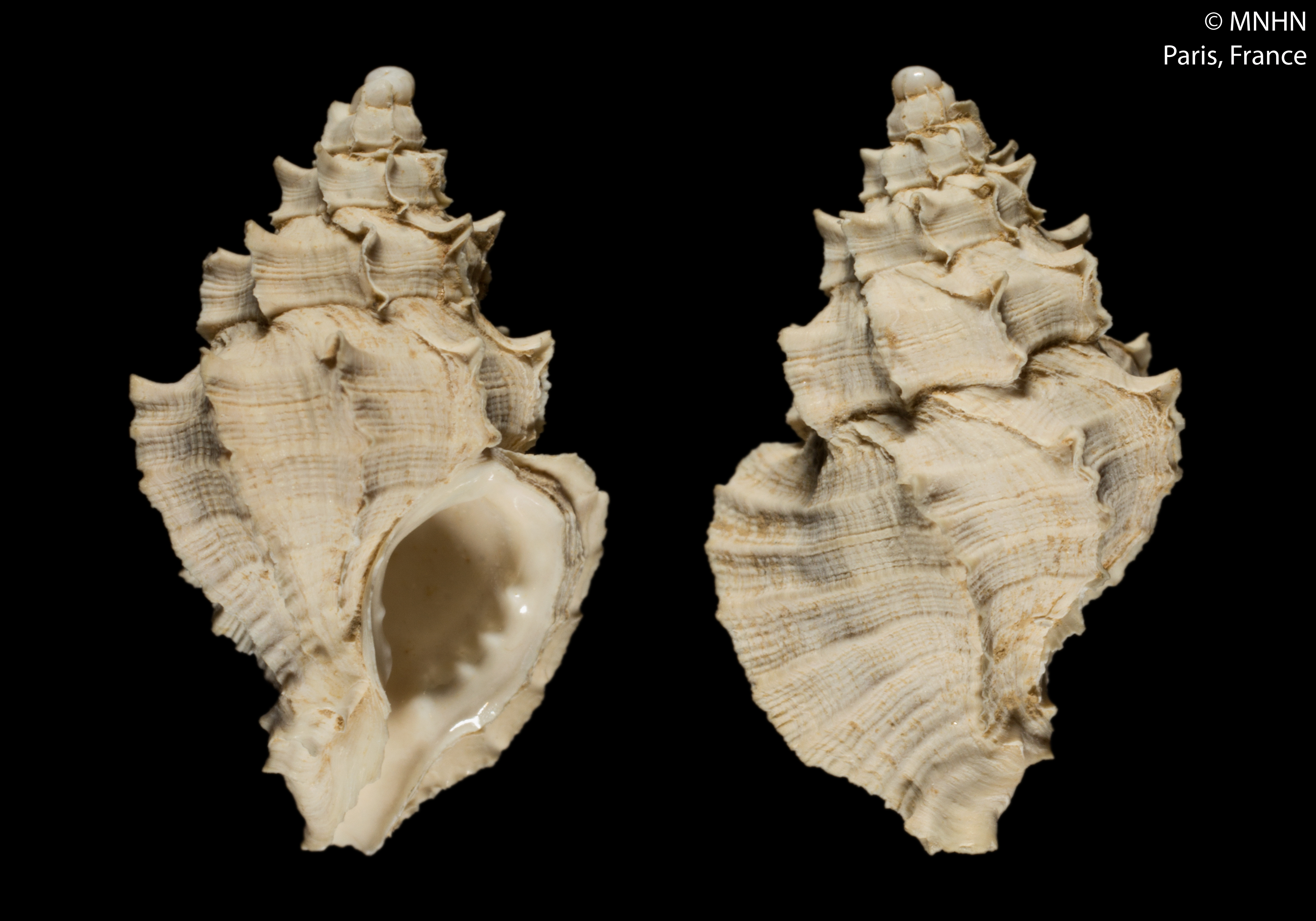
- Shell of Flexopteron akainakares (holotype at MNHN, Paris)

Scientific classification
- Kingdom: Animalia
- Phylum: Mollusca
- Class: Gastropoda
- Subclass: Caenogastropoda
- Order: Neogastropoda
- Superfamily: Muricoidea
- Family: Muricidae
- Subfamily: Muricinae
- Genus: Flexopteron; Shuto, 1969

Type species
- † Flexopteron philippinensis Shuto, 1969

Synonyms
- Paziella (Flexopteron) Shuto, 1969; Poirieria (Flexopteron) Shuto, 1969

= Flexopteron =

Genus of gastropods

Flexopteron is a genus of sea snails, marine gastropod mollusks in the subfamily Muricinae of the family Muricidae, the murex snails or rock snails.

== Species ==
Species within the genus Flexopteron include:

- Flexopteron akainakares Houart & Héros, 2015
- Flexopteron oliverai (Kosuge, 1984)
- † Flexopteron philippinensis Shuto, 1969
- Flexopteron poppei (Houart, 1993)
- Flexopteron primanova (Houart, 1985)
