= Pazinotus sibogae =

Scientific classification
- Kingdom: Animalia
- Phylum: Mollusca
- Class: Gastropoda
- Subclass: Caenogastropoda
- Order: Neogastropoda
- Family: Muricidae
- Genus: Pazinotus
- Species: P. sibogae

Binomial name
- Pazinotus sibogae (Schepman, 1911)

Synonyms
- Latiaxis sibogae Schepman, 1911

Species of gastropod

Pazinotus sibogae is a species of sea snail, a marine gastropod mollusk in the family Muricidae, the murex snails or rock snails.
