= Calotrophon andrewsi =

Scientific classification
- Kingdom: Animalia
- Phylum: Mollusca
- Class: Gastropoda
- Subclass: Caenogastropoda
- Order: Neogastropoda
- Family: Muricidae
- Genus: Calotrophon
- Species: C. andrewsi

Binomial name
- Calotrophon andrewsi Vokes, 1976

Species of gastropod

Calotrophon andrewsi is a species of sea snail, a marine gastropod mollusk in the family Muricidae, the murex snails or rock snails.
