= Calotrophon turritus =

Scientific classification
- Kingdom: Animalia
- Phylum: Mollusca
- Class: Gastropoda
- Subclass: Caenogastropoda
- Order: Neogastropoda
- Family: Muricidae
- Genus: Calotrophon
- Species: C. turritus

Binomial name
- Calotrophon turritus (Dall, 1919)

Synonyms
- Calotrophon bristolae Hertlein & Strong, 1951; Hertleinella leucostephes Berry, 1958; Tritonalia turritus Dall, 1919

Species of gastropod

Calotrophon turritus is a species of sea snail, a marine gastropod mollusk in the family Muricidae, the murex snails or rock snails.
