= Poirieria syrinx =

Scientific classification
- Kingdom: Animalia
- Phylum: Mollusca
- Class: Gastropoda
- Subclass: Caenogastropoda
- Order: Neogastropoda
- Family: Muricidae
- Genus: Poirieria
- Species: P. syrinx

Binomial name
- Poirieria syrinx Marshall & Houart, 1995

Species of gastropod

Poirieria syrinx is a species of sea snail, a marine gastropod mollusk in the family Muricidae, the murex snails or rock snails.
