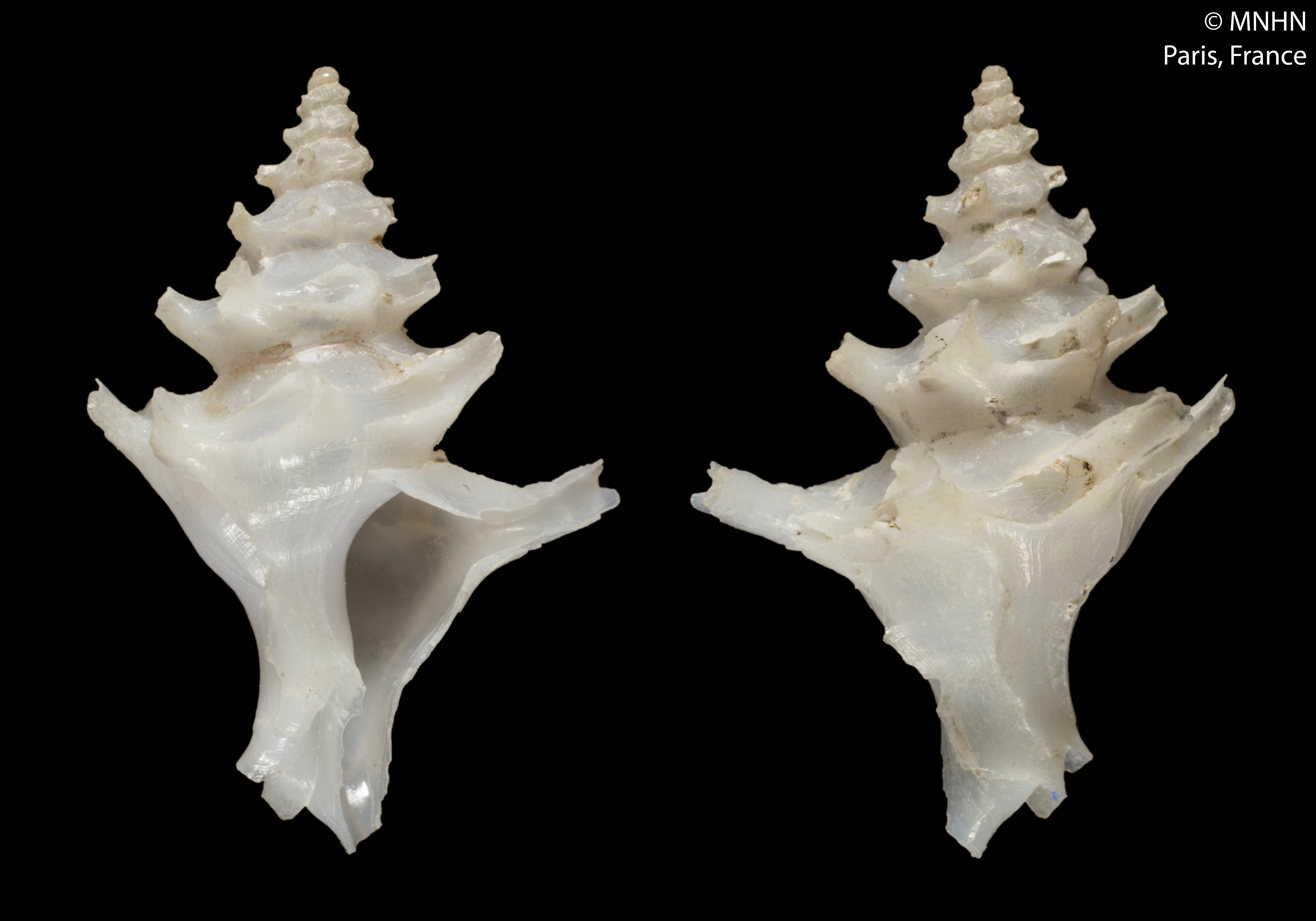
- Shell of Actinotrophon tenuis

Scientific classification
- Kingdom: Animalia
- Phylum: Mollusca
- Class: Gastropoda
- Subclass: Caenogastropoda
- Order: Neogastropoda
- Superfamily: Muricoidea
- Family: Muricidae
- Subfamily: Pagodulinae
- Genus: Actinotrophon; Dall, 1902

Type species
- Trophon (Boreotrophon) actinophorus Dall, 1889

Synonyms
- Boreotrophon (Actinotrophon) Dall, 1902 (original rank); Poirieria (Actinotrophon) Dall, 1889

= Actinotrophon =

Genus of gastropods

Actinotrophon is a genus of sea snails, marine gastropod mollusks in the subfamily Pagodulinae of the family Muricidae, the murex snails or rock snails.

== Description ==
A group which perhaps deserves distinction is Actinotrophon, based on Boreotrophon actinophorus Dall, 1889 in which with the structure of the thin Borvotrophon with long coronating spines is united as a feature, not elsewhere noted in the genus, of successive canals, so curved that the projecting old ones, recurving from the siphonal fasciole form a whorl of hollow split spines, diverging from a deep umbilical pit, as in some murices. In Murex, however, the siphonal canal is closed and the aperture has a projecting callous margin.

== Species ==
Species within the genus Actinotrophon include:

- Actinotrophon actinophorus (Dall, 1889)
- Actinotrophon fragilis (Houart, 1996)
- Actinotrophon tenuis (Houart, 2001)

Species brought into synonymy

- Actinotrophon planispina (E. A. Smith, 1892): synonym of Enixotrophon planispinus (E. A. Smith, 1906)
