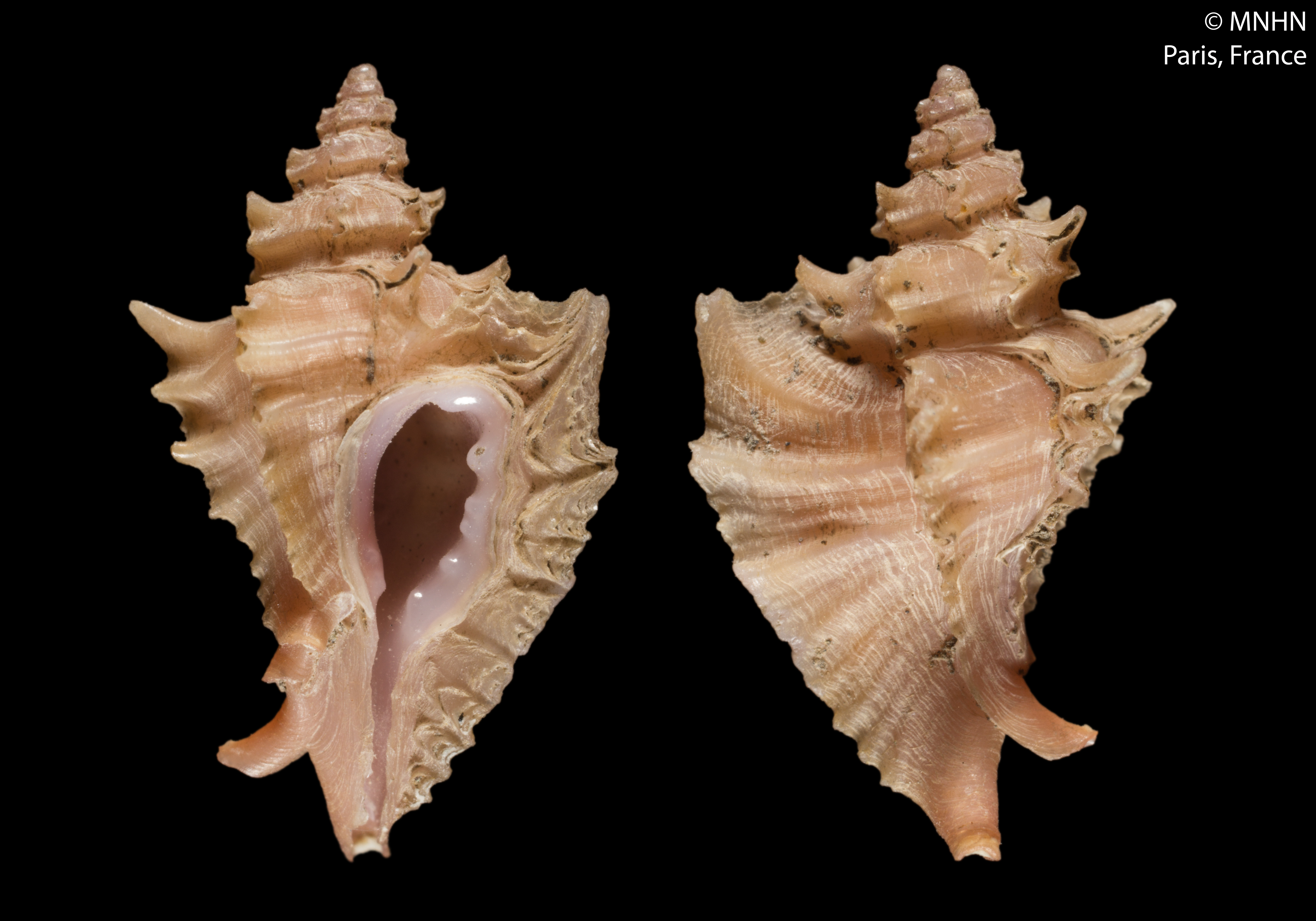
- Pazinotus brevisplendoris

Scientific classification
- Kingdom: Animalia
- Phylum: Mollusca
- Class: Gastropoda
- Subclass: Caenogastropoda
- Order: Neogastropoda
- Superfamily: Muricoidea
- Family: Muricidae
- Subfamily: Muricopsinae
- Genus: Pazinotus; E. H. Vokes, 1970

Type species
- Eupleura stimpsonii Dall, 1889

Synonyms
- Poirieria (Pazinotus)

= Pazinotus =

Genus of gastropods

Pazinotus is a genus of sea snails, marine gastropod mollusks in the subfamily Muricopsinae of the family Muricidae, the murex snails or rock snails.

== Species ==
Species within the genus Pazinotus include:

- Pazinotus advenus Poorman, 1980
- Pazinotus bodarti (Santos Costa, 1993)
- Pazinotus bowdenensis (Vokes, 1970)
- Pazinotus brevisplendoris (Houart, 1985)
- Pazinotus chionodes Houart & Héros, 2012
- Pazinotus falcatiformis (Thiele, 1925)
- Pazinotus gili Costa & Pimenta, 2012
- Pazinotus goesi Houart, 2006
- Pazinotus kilburni (Houart, 1987)
- Pazinotus oliverai (Kosuge, 1984)
- Pazinotus sibogae (Schepman, 1911)
- Pazinotus smithi (Schepman, 1911)
- Pazinotus spectabilis Houart, 1991
- Pazinotus stimpsonii (Dall, 1889)
