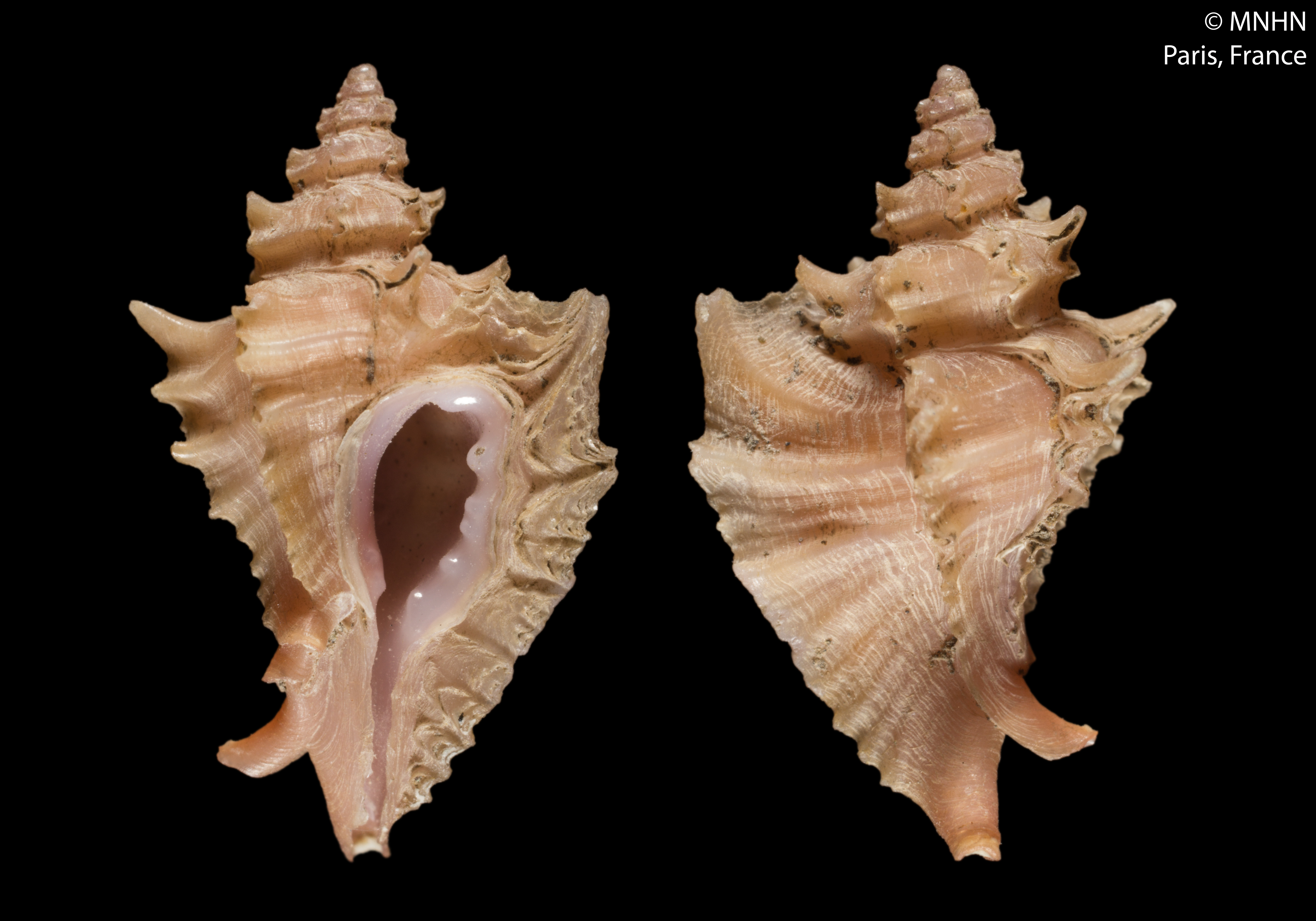
- Shell of Pazinotus brevisplendoris (holotype at MNHN, Paris)

Scientific classification
- Kingdom: Animalia
- Phylum: Mollusca
- Class: Gastropoda
- Subclass: Caenogastropoda
- Order: Neogastropoda
- Family: Muricidae
- Genus: Pazinotus
- Species: P. brevisplendoris

Binomial name
- Pazinotus brevisplendoris (Houart, 1985)

Synonyms
- Poirieria (Pazinotus) brevisplendoris Houart, 1985

= Pazinotus brevisplendoris =

Species of gastropod

Pazinotus brevisplendoris is a species of sea snail, a marine gastropod mollusk in the family Muricidae, the murex snails or rock snails.
