= Poirieria kopua =

Scientific classification
- Kingdom: Animalia
- Phylum: Mollusca
- Class: Gastropoda
- Subclass: Caenogastropoda
- Order: Neogastropoda
- Family: Muricidae
- Genus: Poirieria
- Species: P. kopua

Binomial name
- Poirieria kopua Dell, 1956

Species of gastropod

Poirieria kopua is a species of small predatory sea snail with an operculum. It is a marine gastropod mollusc in the family Muricidae, the rock snails or murex snails.
