= Calotrophon ostrearum =

Scientific classification
- Kingdom: Animalia
- Phylum: Mollusca
- Class: Gastropoda
- Subclass: Caenogastropoda
- Order: Neogastropoda
- Family: Muricidae
- Genus: Calotrophon
- Species: C. ostrearum

Binomial name
- Calotrophon ostrearum (Conrad, 1846)

Synonyms
- Calotrophon emilyae Petuch, 1988; Fusus mexicanus Reeve, 1848; Murex ostrearum Conrad, 1846; Muricidea floridana var. attenuata Dall, 1890; Urosalpinx floridana Conrad, 1869

Species of gastropod

Calotrophon ostrearum, common name the mauve-mouth drill, is a species of small, predatory sea snail, a marine gastropod mollusk in the family Muricidae, the murex snails or rock snails.
