= Calotrophon eugeniae =

Scientific classification
- Kingdom: Animalia
- Phylum: Mollusca
- Class: Gastropoda
- Subclass: Caenogastropoda
- Order: Neogastropoda
- Family: Muricidae
- Genus: Calotrophon
- Species: C. eugeniae

Binomial name
- Calotrophon eugeniae (Vokes, 1992)

Synonyms
- Calotrophon (Panamurex) eugeniae (Vokes, 1992); Poirieria (Panamurex) eugeniae Vokes, 1992 (basionym)

Species of gastropod

Calotrophon eugeniae is a species of sea snail, a marine gastropod mollusk in the family Muricidae, the murex snails or rock snails. There is no listed species like this.

== Description ==
The size of the shell reaches a length of 20 mm.

== Distribution ==
This species is distributed in the Caribbean Sea along Colombia.
