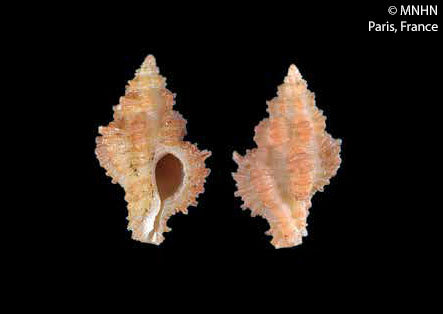
- Shell of Calotrophon velero (specimen at MNHN, Paris)

Scientific classification
- Kingdom: Animalia
- Phylum: Mollusca
- Class: Gastropoda
- Subclass: Caenogastropoda
- Order: Neogastropoda
- Family: Muricidae
- Genus: Calotrophon
- Species: C. velero

Binomial name
- Calotrophon velero (Vokes, 1970)

Synonyms
- Calotrophon (Panamurex) velero (Vokes, 1970); Poirieria (Panamurex) velero (Vokes, 1970); Poirieria velero Vokes, 1970 (original combination)

= Calotrophon velero =

Species of gastropod

Calotrophon velero is a species of sea snail, a marine gastropod mollusk in the family Muricidae, the murex snails or rock snails.

== Description ==
The size of an adult shell varies between 13 mm and 25 mm.

== Distribution ==
C. velero lives in the Caribbean Sea off Colombia, Venezuela, French Guiana and the Netherlands Antilles.
