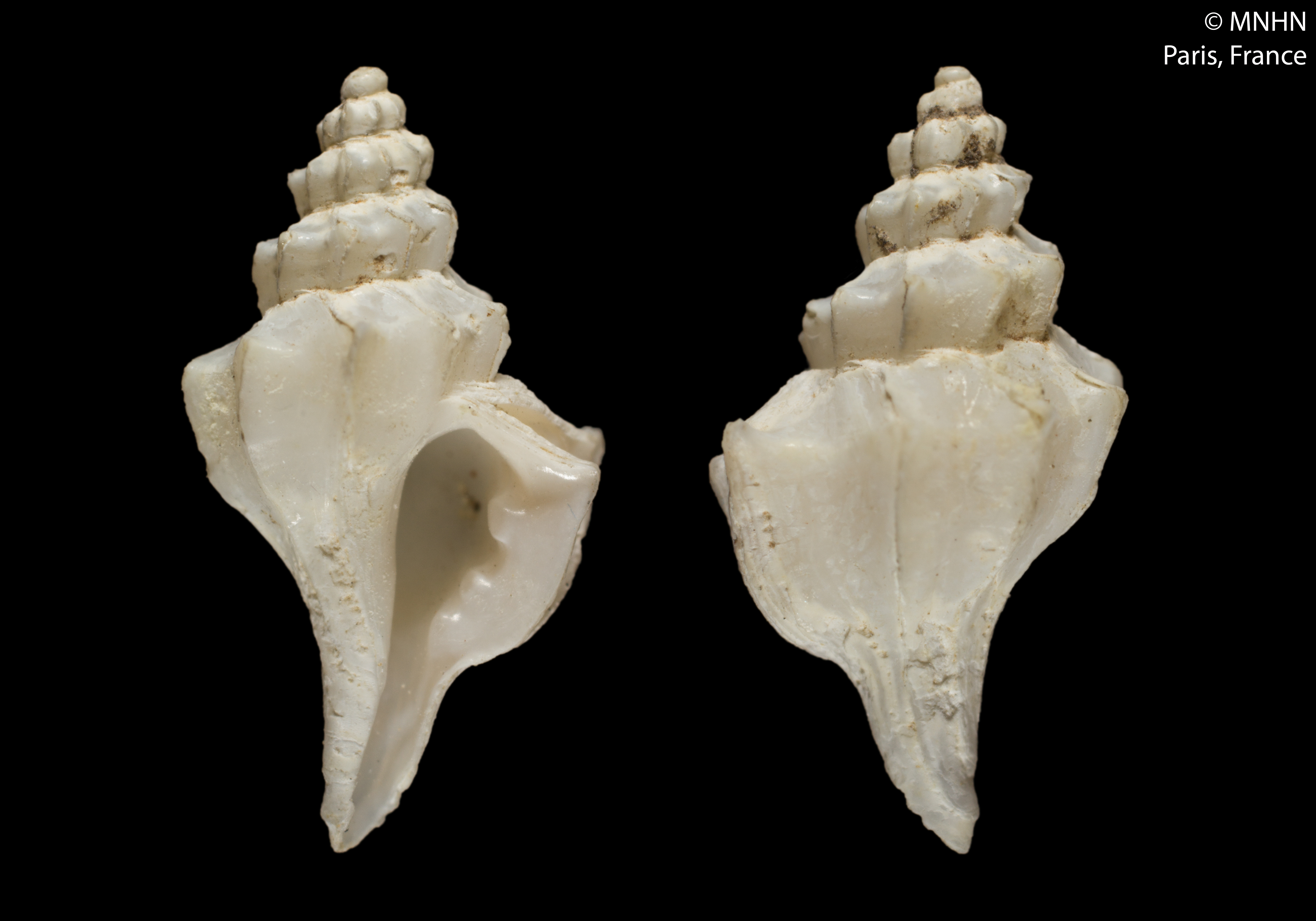
- Shell of Paziella tanoa (holotype at MNHN, Paris)

Scientific classification
- Kingdom: Animalia
- Phylum: Mollusca
- Class: Gastropoda
- Subclass: Caenogastropoda
- Order: Neogastropoda
- Family: Muricidae
- Genus: Paziella
- Species: P. tanaoa

Binomial name
- Paziella tanaoa (Houart & Tröndlé, 2008)

Synonyms
- Paziella (Flexopteron) tanaoa (Houart & Tröndlé, 2008); Poirieria (Paziella) tanaoa Houart & Tröndlé, 2008

= Paziella tanaoa =

Species of gastropod

Paziella tanaoa is a species of sea snail, a marine gastropod mollusk in the family Muricidae, the murex snails or rock snails.

== Description ==
The length of the shell attains 8.2 mm.

== Distribution ==
This marine species is found off the Marquesas Islands.
