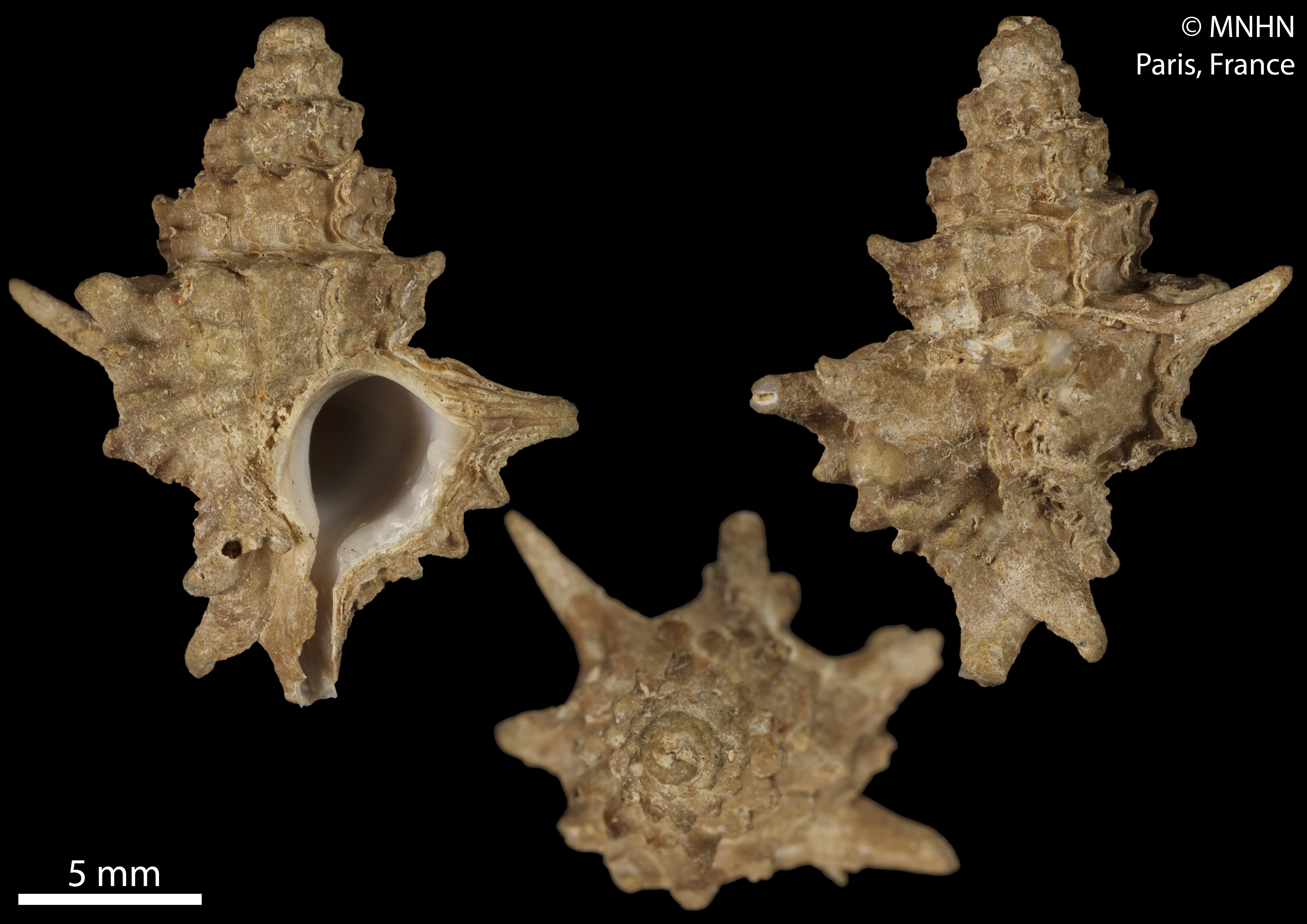
- Shell of Bouchetia hystricina (specimen at MNHN, Paris)

Scientific classification
- Kingdom: Animalia
- Phylum: Mollusca
- Class: Gastropoda
- Subclass: Caenogastropoda
- Order: Neogastropoda
- Family: Muricidae
- Genus: Bouchetia
- Species: B. hystricina

Binomial name
- Bouchetia hystricina (Dall, 1889)

Synonyms
- Murex (Phyllonotus) hystricina Dall, 1889; Paziella (Bouchetia) hystricina (Dall, 1889); Paziella hystricina (Dall, 1889); Poirieria (Pazinotus) hystricina (Dall, 1889)

= Bouchetia hystricina =

Species of gastropod

Bouchetia hystricina is a species of sea snail, a marine gastropod mollusc in the family Muricidae, the murex snails or rock snails.

== Description ==
The shell grows to a length of 21 mm.

== Distribution ==
This species occurs in the Gulf of Mexico, the Caribbean Sea, and the Lesser Antilles.
