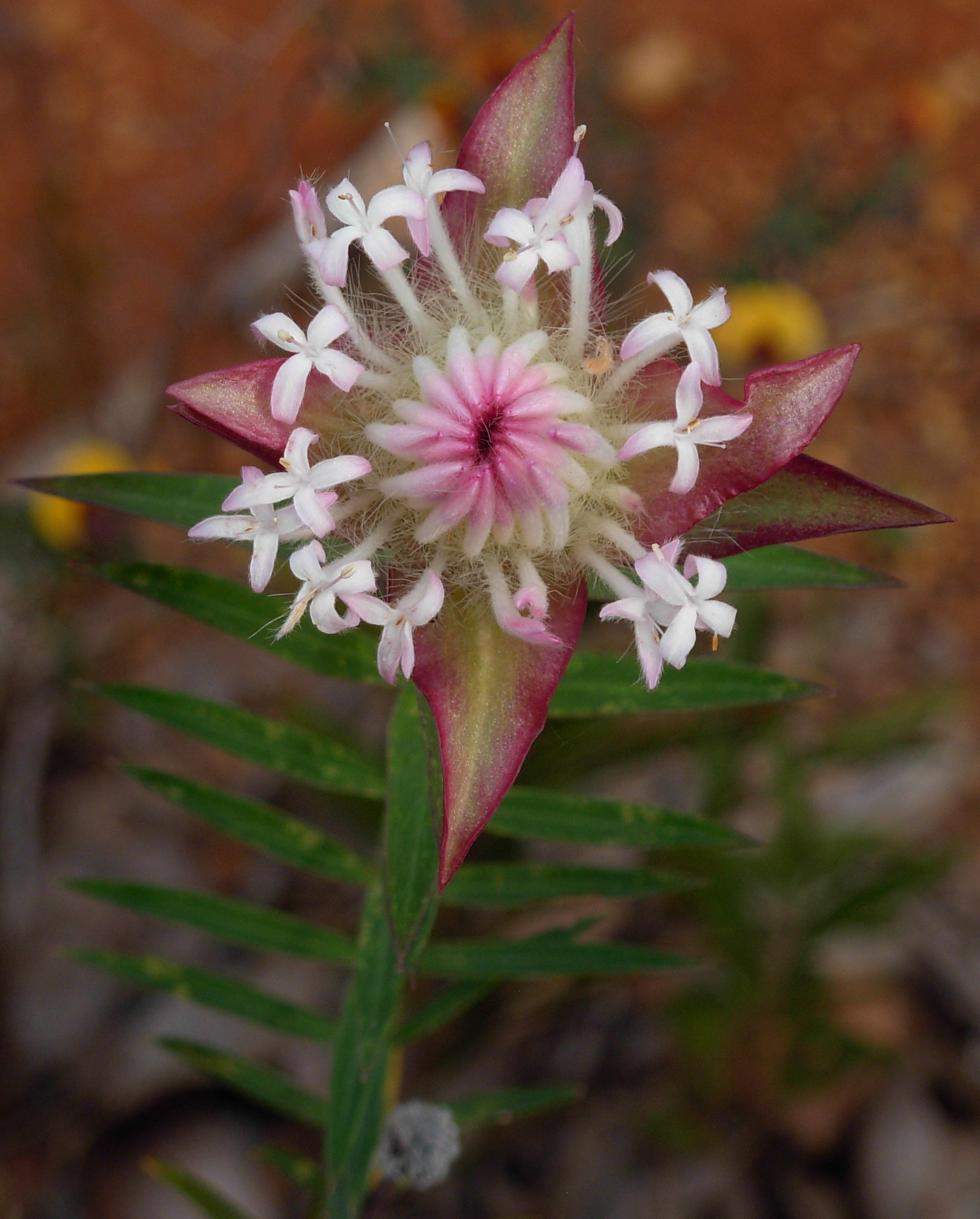

Scientific classification
- Kingdom: Plantae
- Clade: Tracheophytes
- Clade: Angiosperms
- Clade: Eudicots
- Clade: Rosids
- Order: Malvales
- Family: Thymelaeaceae
- Genus: Pimelea
- Species: P. spectabilis

Binomial name
- Pimelea spectabilis Lindl.

Synonyms
- Banksia spectabilis (Lindl.) Kuntze; Heterolaena spectabilis (Lindl.) Fisch. & C.A.Mey. ex Fisch. & Ave-Lall.; Pimelea spectabilis Lindl. var. spectabilis

= Pimelea spectabilis =

Species of shrub

Pimelea spectabilis, or bunjong, is a species of flowering plant in the family Thymelaeaceae and is endemic to the south-west of Western Australia. It is an erect shrub with very narrowly elliptic leaves and heads of white, pale pink or pale yellow flowers surrounded by 4 or 6 egg-shaped involucral bracts.

== Description ==
Pimelea spectabilis is an erect shrub that typically grows to a height of 0.5–2 m (1 ft 8 in – 6 ft 7 in) and usually has a single stem at ground level. The leaves are narrowly or very narrowly elliptic, 11–55 mm (0.43–2.17 in) long and 2–7 mm (0.079–0.276 in) wide on a petiole 0.5–1.5 mm (0.020–0.059 in) long. The upper surface is often bluish and the lower surface is a paler shade of green. The flowers are white, pale pink or pale yellow and arranged in heads on a peduncle 2–15 mm (0.079–0.591 in) long, each flower on a hairy pedicel 1.5–2.0 mm (0.059–0.079 in) long. The heads are surrounded by 4 or 6 egg-shaped to broadly egg-shaped, green to reddish involucral bracts 16–30 mm (0.63–1.18 in) long and 9–20 mm (0.35–0.79 in) wide. The flower tube is 13–19 mm (0.51–0.75 in) long, the sepals 4–6 mm (0.16–0.24 in) long, and the stamens are longer than the sepals. Flowering mainly occurs from September to November.

== Taxonomy ==
Pimelea spectabilis was first formally described in 1839 by John Lindley in his A Sketch of the Vegetation of the Swan River Colony. The specific epithet (spectabilis) means "remarkable" or "spectacular".

== Distribution and habitat ==
This pimelea usually grows on hills, often in jarrah forest, and occurs between Cape Naturaliste and the Fitzgerald River National Park in the Avon Wheatbelt, Esperance Plains, Jarrah Forest, Swan Coastal Plain and Warren bioregions of south-western Western Australia.

== Conservation status ==
Pimelea sessilis is listed as "not threatened" by the Government of Western Australia Department of Biodiversity, Conservation and Attractions.
