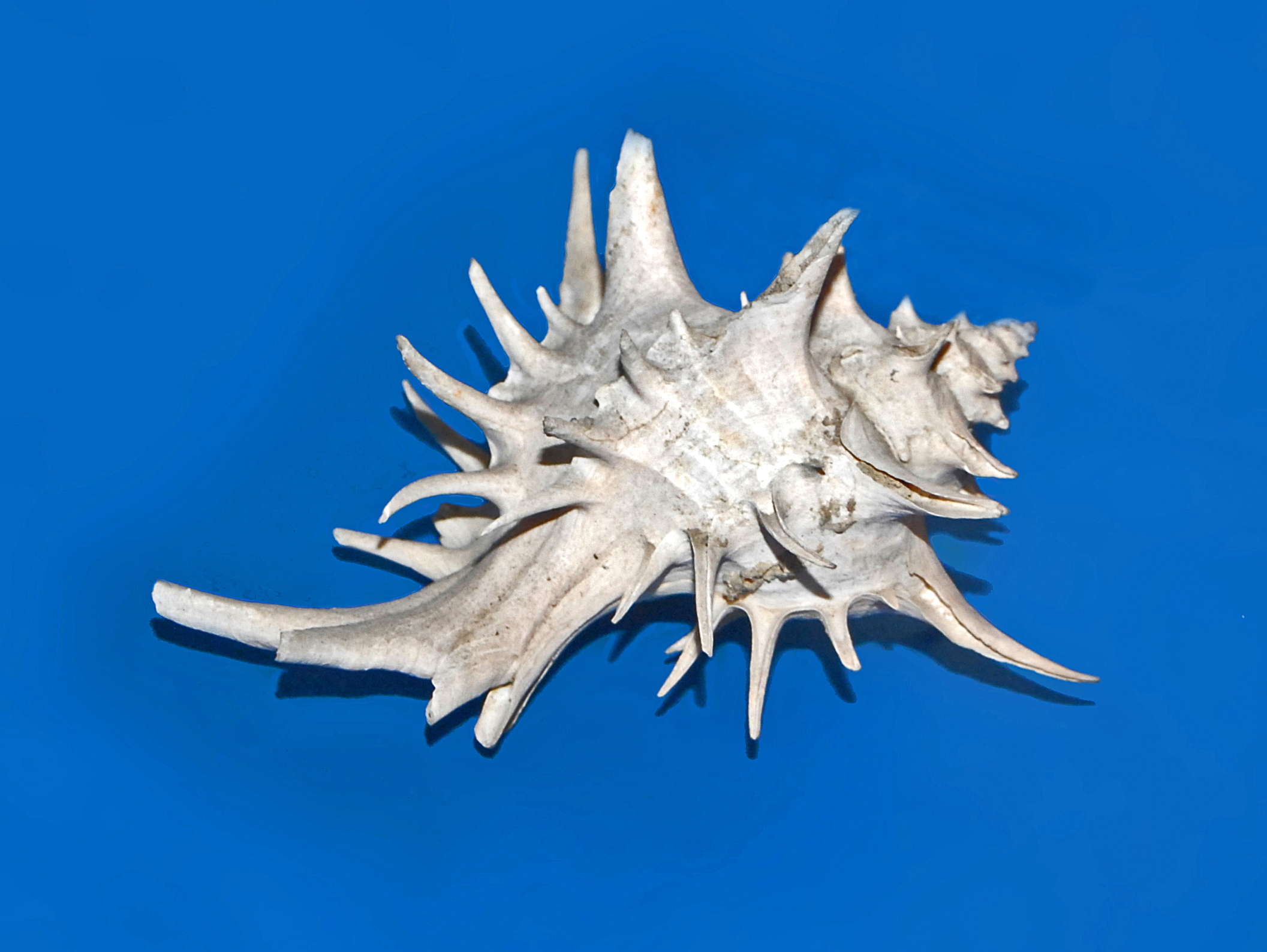
- Shell of Poirieria zelandica from New Zealand, on display at the Museo Civico di Storia Naturale di Milano

Scientific classification
- Kingdom: Animalia
- Phylum: Mollusca
- Class: Gastropoda
- Subclass: Caenogastropoda
- Order: Neogastropoda
- Family: Muricidae
- Genus: Poirieria
- Species: P. zelandica

Binomial name
- Poirieria zelandica (Quoy & Gaimard,1833)

Synonyms
- Murex novaezeelandiae Gray, J.E. in Sowerby, G.B. II, 1834

= Poirieria zelandica =

Species of gastropod

Poirieria zelandica, common name the spiny murex, is a species of a large predatory sea snail with an operculum. It is a marine gastropod mollusc in the family Muricidae, the rock snails or murex snails.

== Description ==
Shells of Poirieria zelandica can reach a size of 35–65 millimetres (1.4–2.6 in). These shells are roughly fusiforms, with long, straight spines. The aperture is ovate and large. The outer lip is thin.

== Distribution ==
This species can be found in Tasmania and New Zealand.

== Gallery ==
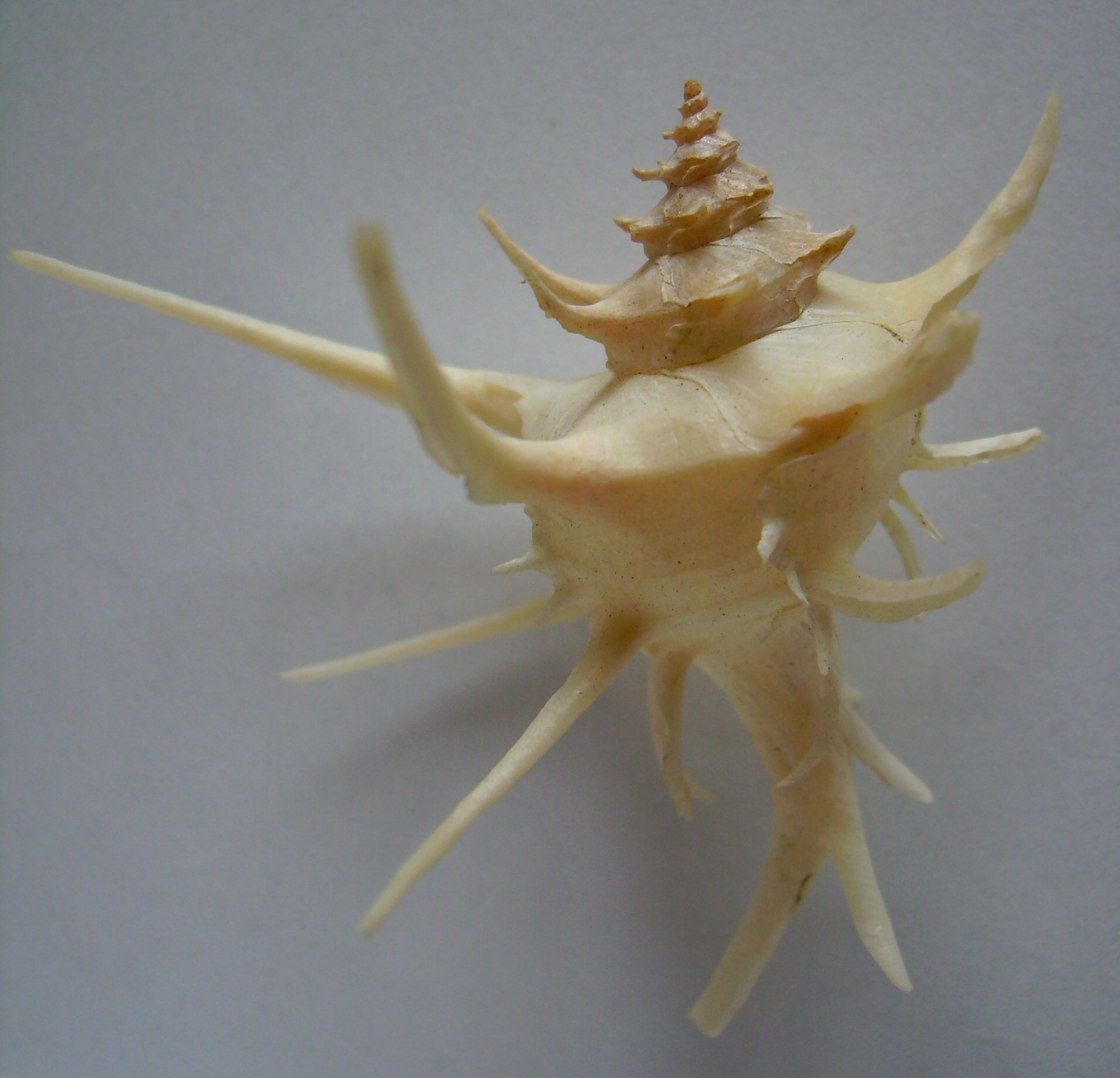
Shell
