= Paziella atlantis =

Scientific classification
- Kingdom: Animalia
- Phylum: Mollusca
- Class: Gastropoda
- Subclass: Caenogastropoda
- Order: Neogastropoda
- Family: Muricidae
- Genus: Paziella
- Species: P. atlantis

Binomial name
- Paziella atlantis (Clench & Farfante, 1945)

Synonyms
- Murex (Bathymurex) atlantis Clench & Pérez Farfante, 1945 (basionym); Paziella (Paziella) atlantis (Clench & Farfante, 1945); Poirieria (Paziella) atlantis (Clench & Farfante, 1945)

Species of gastropod

Paziella atlantis is a species of sea snail, a marine gastropod mollusk in the family Muricidae, the murex snails or rock snails.

== Description ==
The size of the shell reaches 24 mm.

== Distribution ==
This species is distributed in the Caribbean Sea along Cuba.
