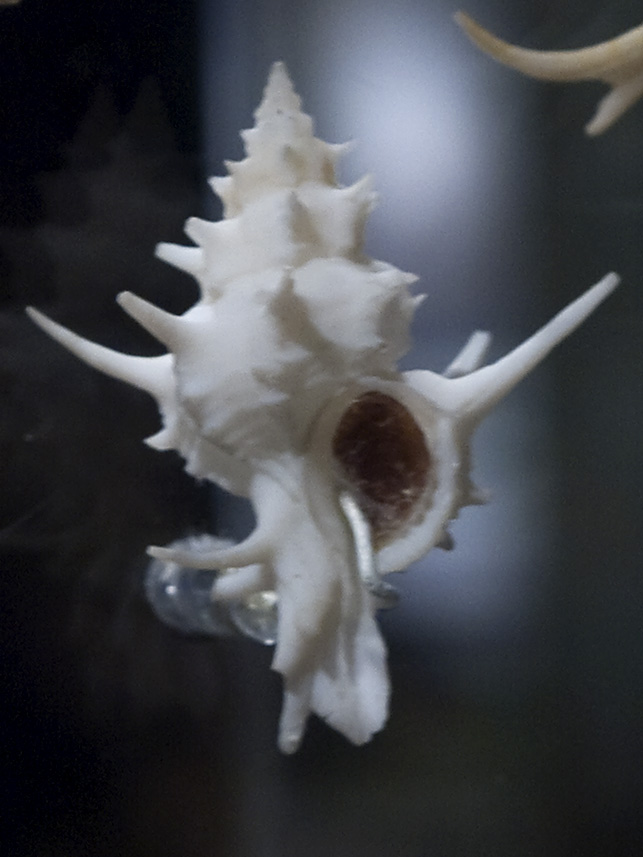

Scientific classification
- Kingdom: Animalia
- Phylum: Mollusca
- Class: Gastropoda
- Subclass: Caenogastropoda
- Order: Neogastropoda
- Family: Muricidae
- Genus: Paziella
- Species: P. pazi

Binomial name
- Paziella pazi (Crosse, 1869)

Synonyms
- Murex pazi Crosse, 1869; Paziella (Paziella) pazi (Crosse, 1869); Poirieria (Paziella) pazi (Crosse, 1869)

= Paziella pazi =

Species of gastropod

Paziella pazi, common name : Paz's murex, is a species of sea snail, a marine gastropod mollusk in the family Muricidae, the murex snails or rock snails.

== Description ==
The adult shell grows to a length of 25 mm to 50 mm.

== Distribution ==
This species is distributed in the Gulf of Mexico, the Caribbean Sea (including Cuba and Belize) and off the coast of Florida.
