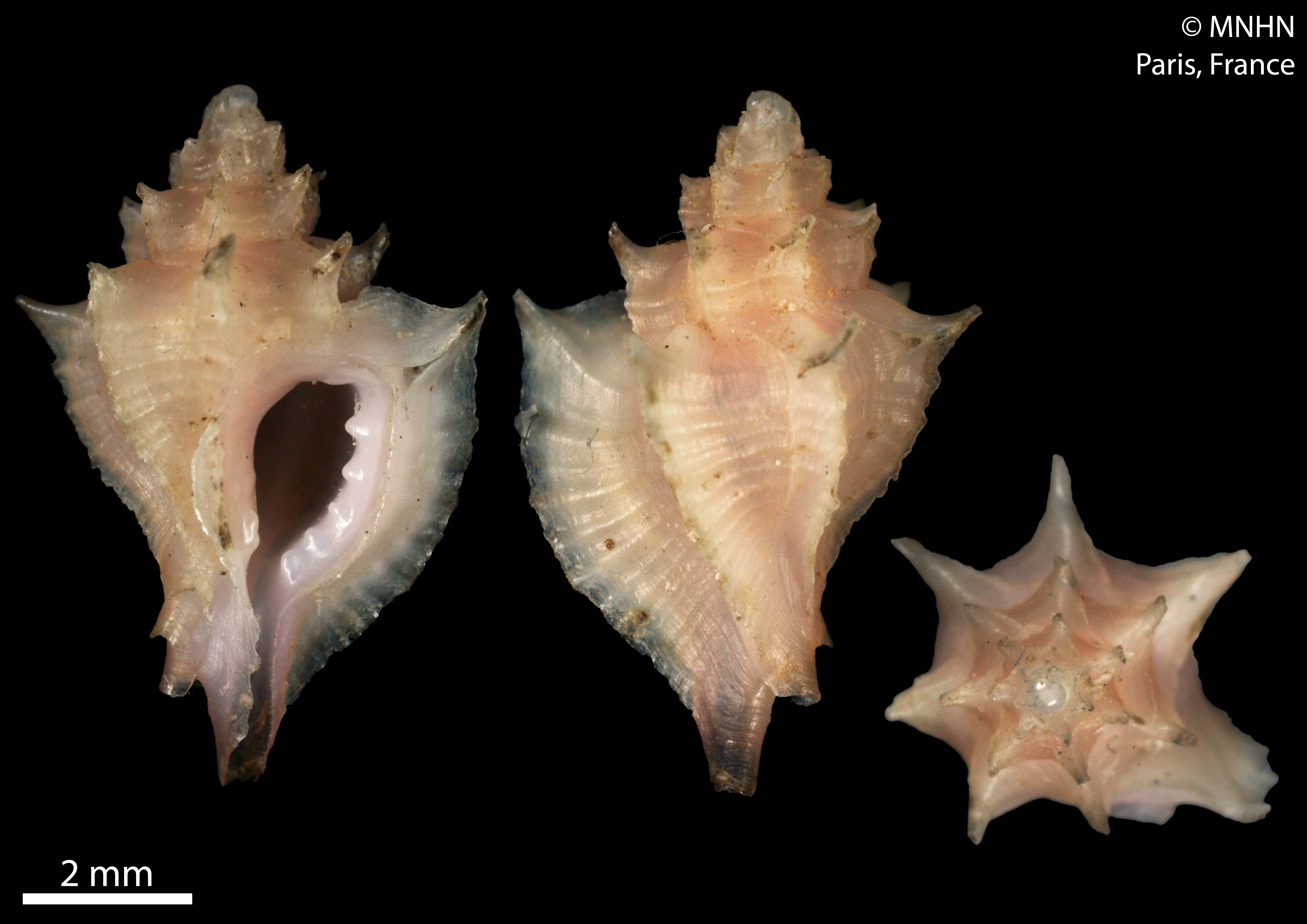

Scientific classification
- Kingdom: Animalia
- Phylum: Mollusca
- Class: Gastropoda
- Subclass: Caenogastropoda
- Order: Neogastropoda
- Family: Muricidae
- Genus: Pazinotus
- Species: P. stimpsonii

Binomial name
- Pazinotus stimpsonii (Dall, 1889)

Synonyms
- Eupleura stimpsonii Dall, 1889

= Pazinotus stimpsonii =

Species of gastropod

Pazinotus stimpsonii is a species of sea snail, a marine gastropod mollusc in the family Muricidae, the murex snails or rock snails.
