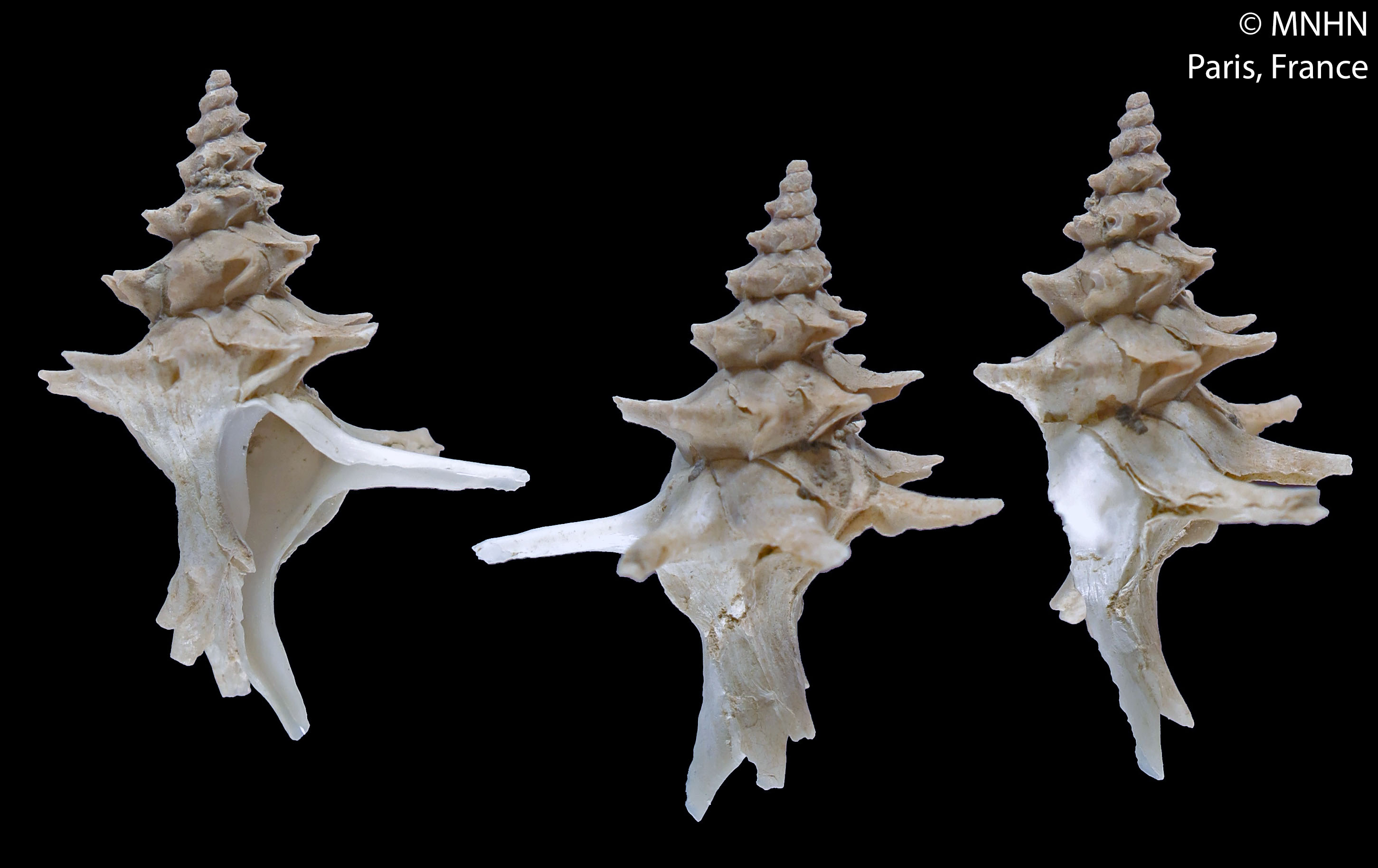
- Shell of Actinotrophon fragilis (specimen at MNHN, Paris)

Scientific classification
- Kingdom: Animalia
- Phylum: Mollusca
- Class: Gastropoda
- Subclass: Caenogastropoda
- Order: Neogastropoda
- Family: Muricidae
- Subfamily: Pagodulinae
- Genus: Actinotrophon
- Species: A. fragilis

Binomial name
- Actinotrophon fragilis (Houart, 1996)
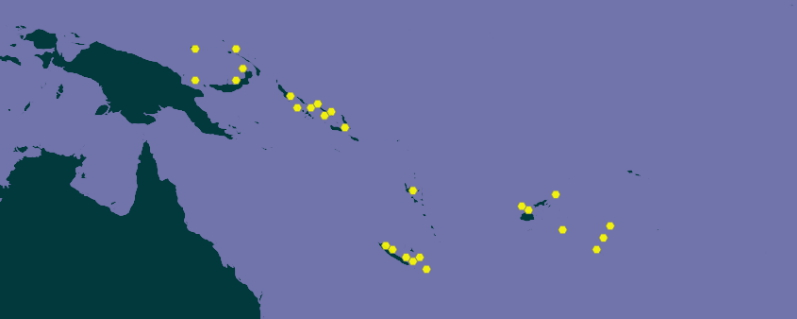

Synonyms
- Poirieria (Actinotrophon) fragilis Houart, 1996· accepted, alternate representation; Poirieria fragilis Houart, 1996

= Actinotrophon fragilis =

Species of gastropod

Actinotrophon fragilis is a species of sea snail, a marine gastropod mollusk in the family Muricidae, the murex snails or rock snails.

== Description ==
The length of the shell varies between 13 mm and 28 mm.

== Distribution ==
This marine species occurs off New Caledonia, Papua New Guinea, Vanuatu and Australia (Western Australia).
