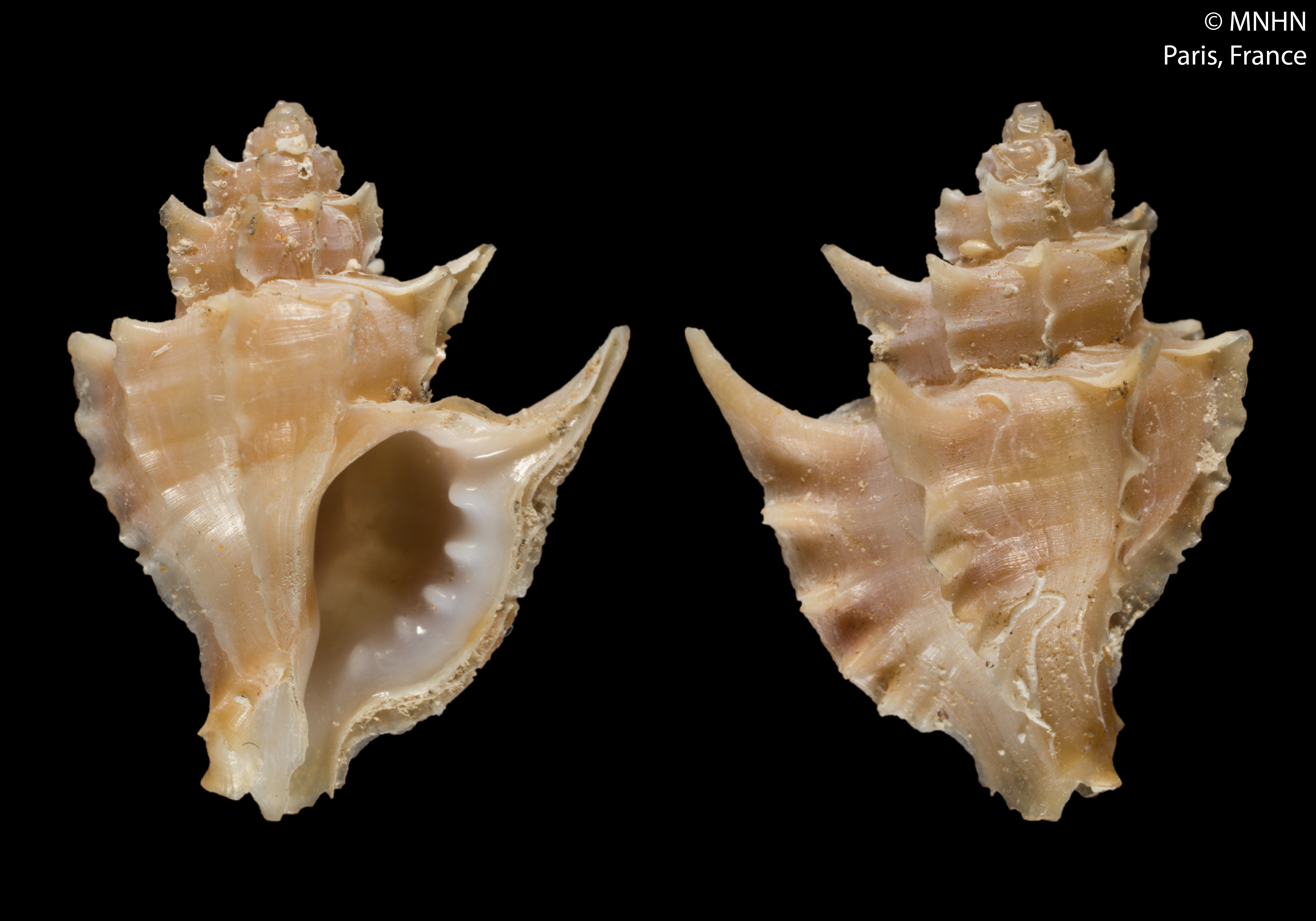
- Shell of Flexopteron primanova (holotype at MNHN, Paris)

Scientific classification
- Kingdom: Animalia
- Phylum: Mollusca
- Class: Gastropoda
- Subclass: Caenogastropoda
- Order: Neogastropoda
- Family: Muricidae
- Genus: Flexopteron
- Species: F. primanova

Binomial name
- Flexopteron primanova (Houart, 1985)

Synonyms
- Paziella (Flexopteron) primanova (Houart, 1985); Paziella primanova (Houart, 1985); Poirieria (Flexopteron) primanova Houart, 1985

= Flexopteron primanova =

Species of gastropod

Flexopteron primanova is a species of sea snail, a marine gastropod mollusc in the family Muricidae, the murex snails or rock snails.

== Description ==
The length of an adult shell attains 15 mm.

== Distribution ==
This species occurs in the Indian Ocean off Madagascar.
