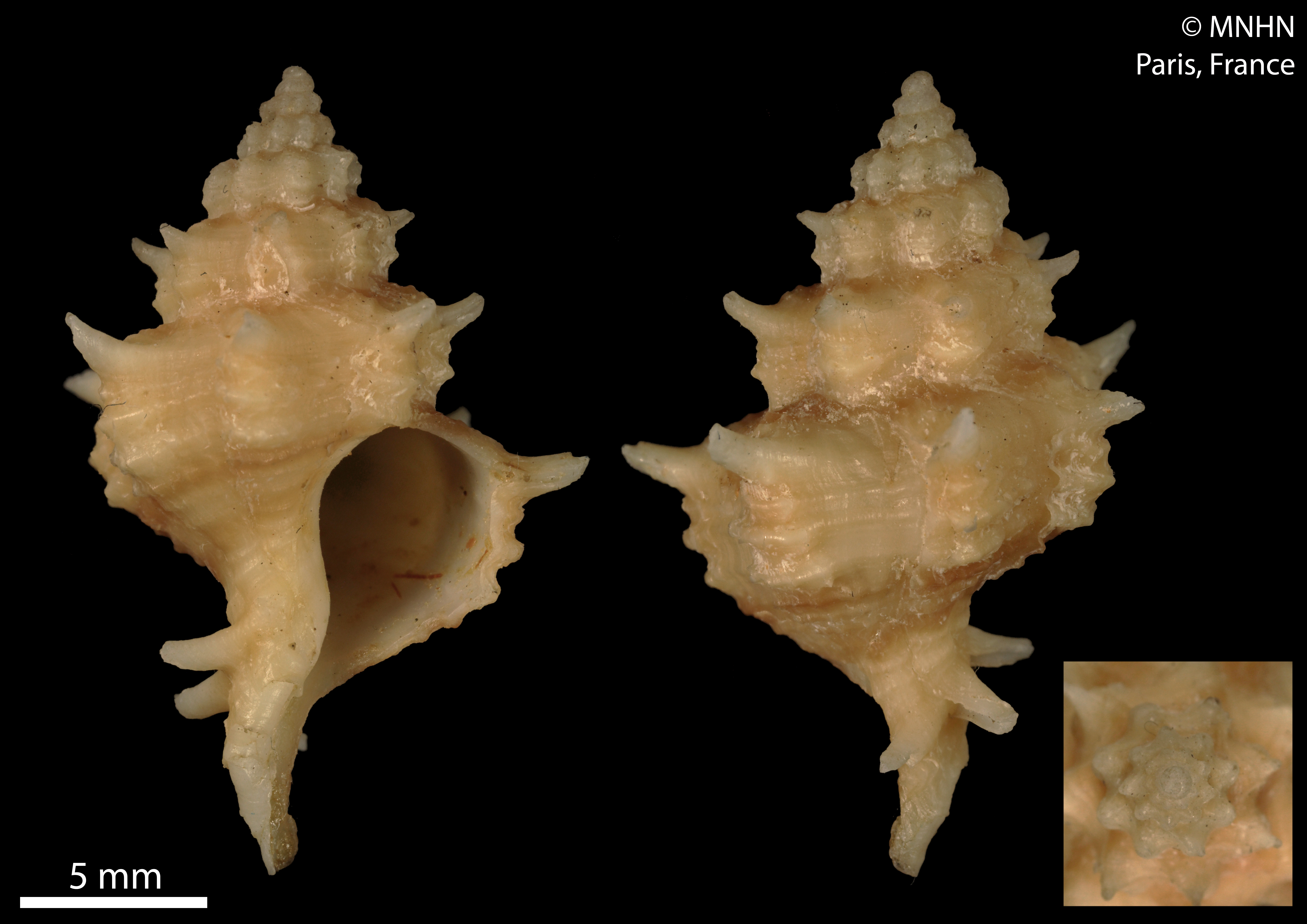
- Shell of Calotrophon carnicolor (specimen at MNHN, Paris)

Scientific classification
- Kingdom: Animalia
- Phylum: Mollusca
- Class: Gastropoda
- Subclass: Caenogastropoda
- Order: Neogastropoda
- Family: Muricidae
- Genus: Calotrophon
- Species: C. carnicolor

Binomial name
- Calotrophon carnicolor (Clench & Farfante, 1945)

Synonyms
- Calotrophon (Panamurex) carnicolor (Clench & Pérez Farfante, 1945); Murex (Murexsul) carnicolor Clench & Farfante, 1945; Poirieria (Panamurex) carnicolor (Clench & Pérez Farfante, 1945)

= Calotrophon carnicolor =

Species of gastropod

== Introduction ==
Calotrophon carnicolor is a species of sea snail, a marine gastropod mollusk in the family Muricidae, the murex snails or rock snails.

The scientific name of this species was first validated and published in 1945 by Clench Farfante & Isabel Pérez Farfante.

== Description ==
The size of the shell of a Calotrophon carnicolor attains 20 millimeters ( 2 cm; 0,78 in )

== Distribution ==
This species is distributed in the Lesser Antilles off Guadeloupe and off Nevis and Barbados.
