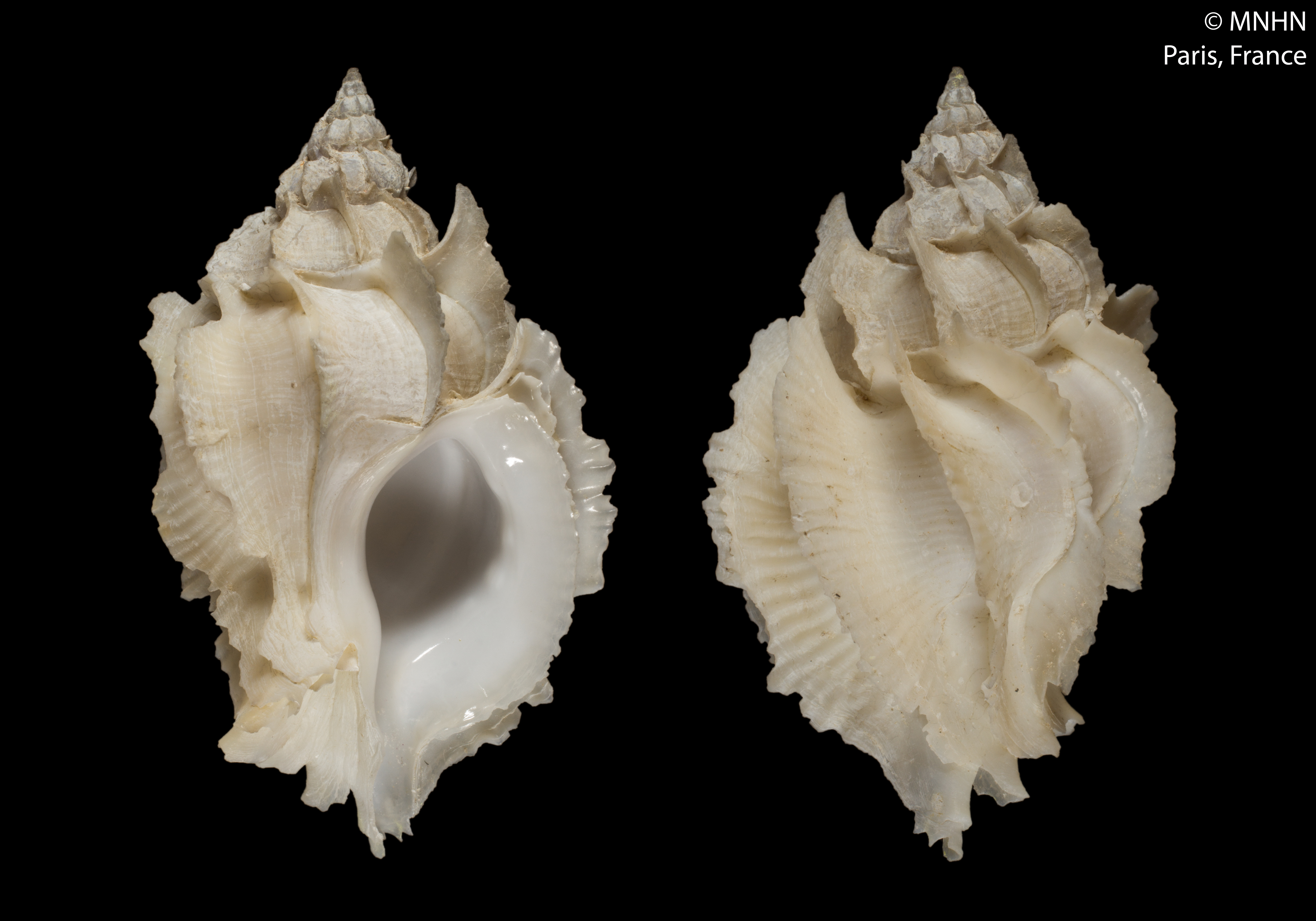
- Shell of Flexopteron poppei (holotype at MNHN, Paris)

Scientific classification
- Kingdom: Animalia
- Phylum: Mollusca
- Class: Gastropoda
- Subclass: Caenogastropoda
- Order: Neogastropoda
- Family: Muricidae
- Genus: Flexopteron
- Species: F. poppei

Binomial name
- Flexopteron poppei (Houart, 1993)

Synonyms
- Paziella (Flexopteron) poppei (Houart, 1993); Paziella poppei (Houart, 1993); Poirieria (Flexopteron) poppei Houart, 1993

= Flexopteron poppei =

Species of gastropod

Flexopteron poppei is a species of sea snail, a marine gastropod mollusc in the family Muricidae, the murex snails or rock snails.

== Description ==
The size of an adult shell varies between 18 mm and 52 mm.

== Distribution ==
This species occurs in the Pacific Ocean off the Philippines.
