= Pazinotus bodarti =

Scientific classification
- Kingdom: Animalia
- Phylum: Mollusca
- Class: Gastropoda
- Subclass: Caenogastropoda
- Order: Neogastropoda
- Family: Muricidae
- Genus: Pazinotus
- Species: P. bodarti

Binomial name
- Pazinotus bodarti (Santos Costa, 1993)

Synonyms
- Poirieria (Pazinotus) bodarti Santos Costa, 1993

Species of gastropod

Pazinotus bodarti is a species of sea snail, a marine gastropod mollusk in the family Muricidae, the murex snails or rock snails.
