= Pazinotus bowdenensis =

Scientific classification
- Kingdom: Animalia
- Phylum: Mollusca
- Class: Gastropoda
- Subclass: Caenogastropoda
- Order: Neogastropoda
- Family: Muricidae
- Genus: Pazinotus
- Species: P. bowdenensis

Binomial name
- Pazinotus bowdenensis (Vokes, 1970)

Synonyms
- Poirieria bowdenensis Vokes, 1970

Species of gastropod

Pazinotus bowdenensis is a species of sea snail, a marine gastropod mollusk in the family Muricidae, the murex snails or rock snails.
