= Paziella nuttingi =

Scientific classification
- Kingdom: Animalia
- Phylum: Mollusca
- Class: Gastropoda
- Subclass: Caenogastropoda
- Order: Neogastropoda
- Family: Muricidae
- Genus: Paziella
- Species: P. nuttingi

Binomial name
- Paziella nuttingi (Dall, 1896)

Synonyms
- Murex nuttingi Dall, 1896; Paziella (Paziella) nuttingi (Dall, 1896); Poirieria (Paziella) nuttingi (Dall, 1896)

Species of sea snail

Paziella nuttingi, common name : Nutting's murex, is a species of sea snail, a marine gastropod mollusk in the family Muricidae, the murex snails or rock snails.

== Description ==
The shell grows to a length of 44 mm.

== Distribution ==
This species can be found in the Gulf of Mexico and off the coast of Florida.
