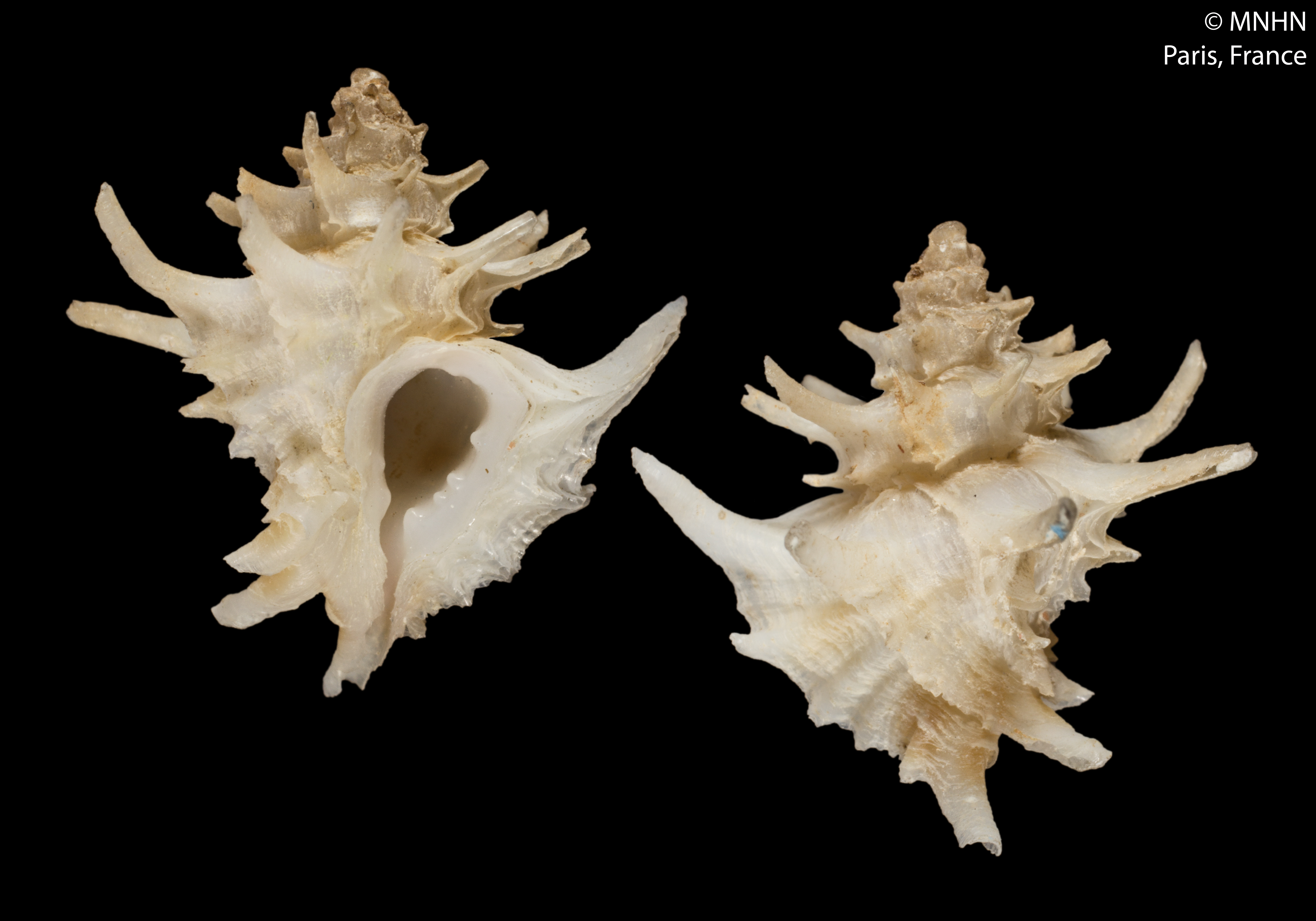
- Shell of Pazinotus spectabilis (holotype at MNHN, Paris)

Scientific classification
- Kingdom: Animalia
- Phylum: Mollusca
- Class: Gastropoda
- Subclass: Caenogastropoda
- Order: Neogastropoda
- Family: Muricidae
- Genus: Pazinotus
- Species: P. spectabilis

Binomial name
- Pazinotus spectabilis Houart, 1991

= Pazinotus spectabilis =

Species of gastropod

Pazinotus spectabilis is a species of sea snail, a marine gastropod mollusk in the family Muricidae, the murex snails or rock snails.
