= Paziella petuchi =

Scientific classification
- Kingdom: Animalia
- Phylum: Mollusca
- Class: Gastropoda
- Subclass: Caenogastropoda
- Order: Neogastropoda
- Family: Muricidae
- Genus: Paziella
- Species: P. petuchi

Binomial name
- Paziella petuchi (Vokes, 1992)

Synonyms
- Paziella (Paziella) petuchi (Vokes, 1992); Poirieria (Paziella) petuchi Vokes, 1992

Species of gastropod

Paziella petuchi is a species of sea snail, a marine gastropod mollusk in the family Muricidae, the murex snails or rock snails.

== Description ==
The size of an adult shell attains 27 mm.

== Distribution ==
This species is distributed in the Caribbean Sea along Venezuela.
