= Paziella galapagana =

Scientific classification
- Kingdom: Animalia
- Phylum: Mollusca
- Class: Gastropoda
- Subclass: Caenogastropoda
- Order: Neogastropoda
- Family: Muricidae
- Genus: Paziella
- Species: P. galapagana

Binomial name
- Paziella galapagana (Emerson & D'Attilio, 1970)

Synonyms
- Murex galapagana W.K. Emerson & A. D'Attilio, 1970 (basionym); Paziella (Paziella) galapagana (Emerson & D'Attilio, 1970); Poirieria (Paziella) galapagana (Emerson & D'Attilio, 1970)

Species of gastropod

Paziella galapagana is a species of sea snail, a marine gastropod mollusk in the family Muricidae, the murex snails or rock snails.

== Distribution ==
This species occurs in the Pacific Ocean along the Galapagos Islands.
