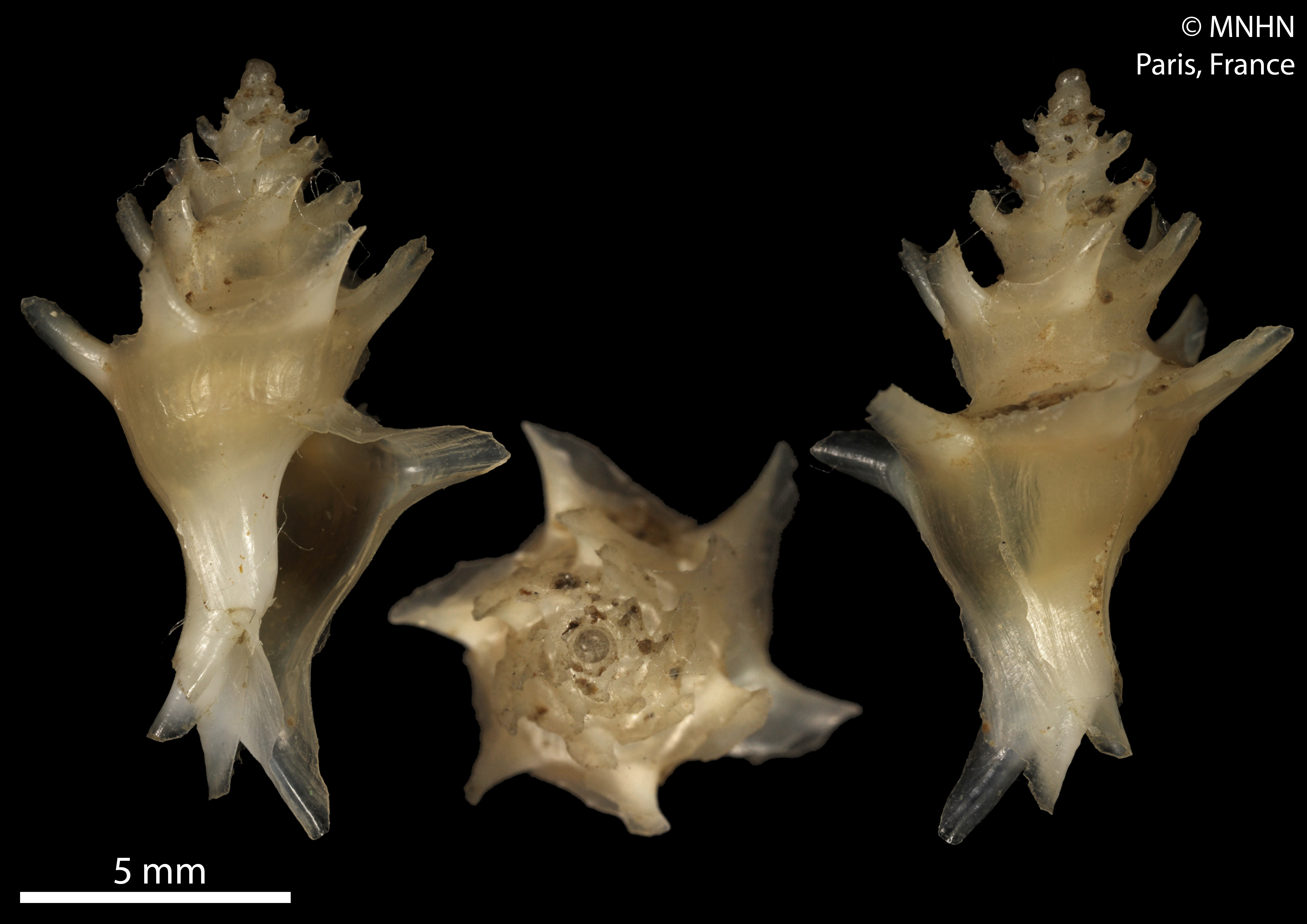
- Shell of Actinotrophon actinophorus (specimen at MNHN, Paris)

Scientific classification
- Kingdom: Animalia
- Phylum: Mollusca
- Class: Gastropoda
- Subclass: Caenogastropoda
- Order: Neogastropoda
- Family: Muricidae
- Subfamily: Pagodulinae
- Genus: Actinotrophon
- Species: A. actinophorus

Binomial name
- Actinotrophon actinophorus (Dall, 1889)
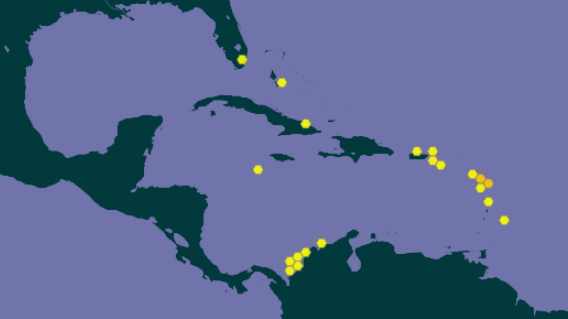

Synonyms
- Boreotrophon actinophorus Dall, 1889; Poirieria (Actinotrophon) actinophora (Dall, 1889)· accepted, alternate representation; Poirieria actinophora (Dall, 1889); Trophon (Boreotrophon) actinophorus Dall, 1889

= Actinotrophon actinophorus =

Species of gastropod

Actinotrophon actinophorus is a species of sea snail, a marine gastropod mollusc in the family Muricidae, the murex snails or rock snails.

== Description ==
Max. length of shell, 17.5 mm; of body whorl, 12.3 mm; of aperture and siphonal canal, 10.0 mm; maximum length of the aperture, 3.0 mm; of the shell exclusive of spines, 6.0 mm; of the whole shell, 14.0 mm.

(Original description) The translucent white shell is very thin and glassy. It contains seven whorls.The white protoconch is smooth and contains two whorls.

The spiral sculpture consists of very fine faint irregular spiral lines. The transverse sculpture consists of the incremental lines and a keel or angulation at the shoulder of the whorl which is produced into long nearly horizontally extended triangular spines, deeply guttered out, and having the upper or posterior side shorter in the direction of rotation than the other, so that looked at from the apex the spines recall the paper whirligigs or wind-wheels used as children's toys. There are six of these spines on the body whorl and thirty-one on the whole shell figured.

The spire is elevated. The suture is distinct, not channelled. The aperture is narrow, long, angulated at the spine, continuous with the open siphonal canal which is curved to the right. At the left of the siphonal canal projects a whorl of three or more tips of antecedent canals (often broken away). The interior of the aperture is simple, not thickened.

== Distribution ==
This species occurs in the Caribbean Sea (Colombia, Cuba, Mexico, Puerto Rico, Virgin Islands, Barbados, Martinique, Guadeloupe); also off the Bahamas.
