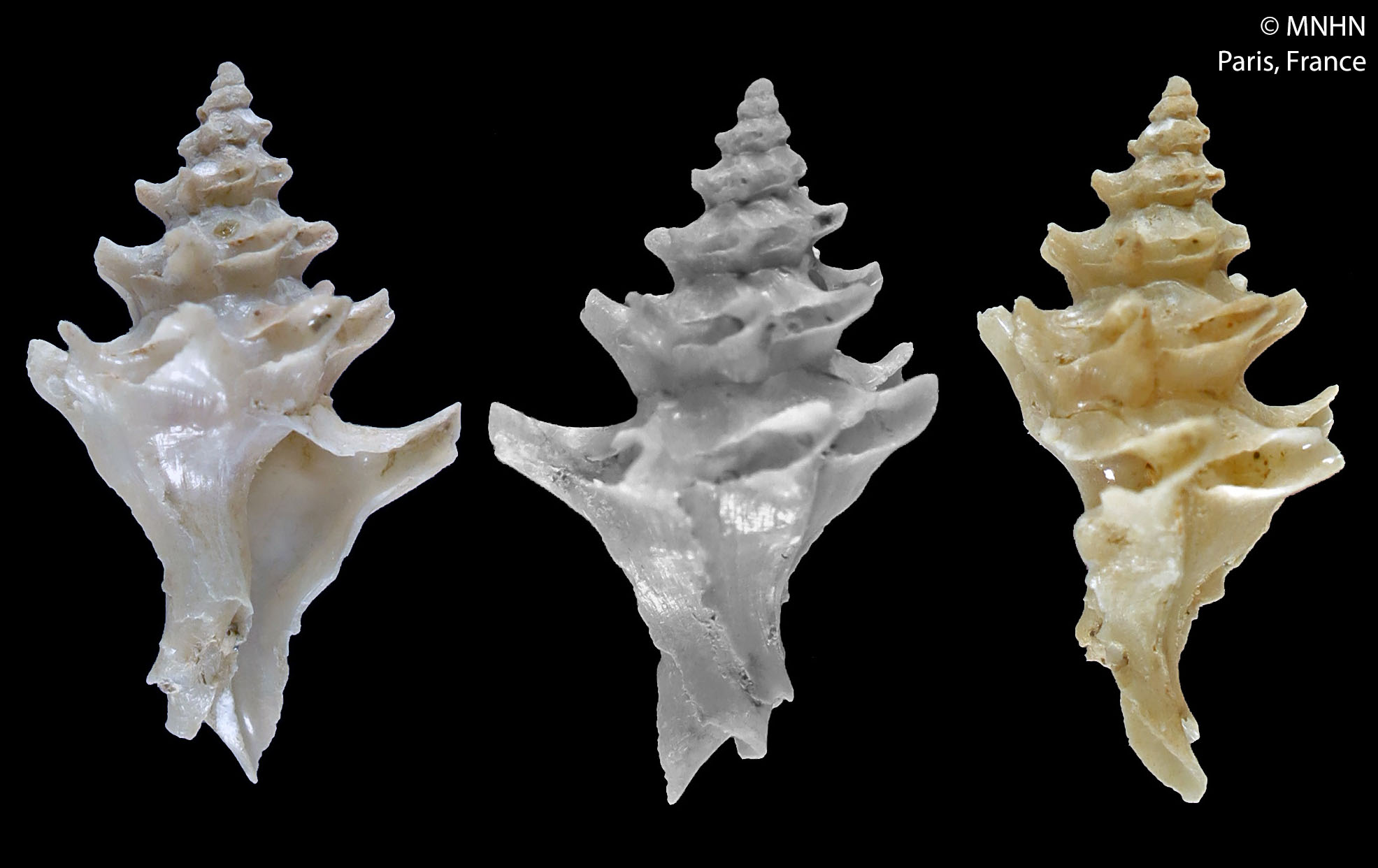
- Shell of Actinotrophon tenuis (specimen at MNHN, Paris)

Scientific classification
- Kingdom: Animalia
- Phylum: Mollusca
- Class: Gastropoda
- Subclass: Caenogastropoda
- Order: Neogastropoda
- Family: Muricidae
- Subfamily: Pagodulinae
- Genus: Actinotrophon
- Species: A. tenuis

Binomial name
- Actinotrophon tenuis (Houart, 2001)
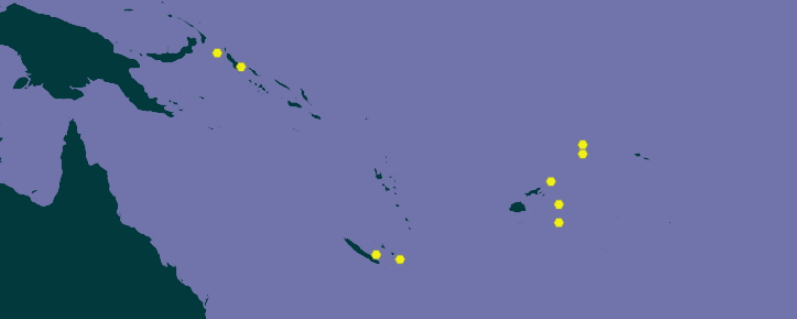

Synonyms
- Poirieria (Actinotrophon) tenuis Houart, 2001· accepted, alternate representation; Poirieria tenuis Houart, 2001

= Actinotrophon tenuis =

Species of gastropod

Actinotrophon tenuis is a species of sea snail, a marine gastropod mollusk in the family Muricidae, the murex snails or rock snails.

== Description ==
The length of the shell varies between 13 mm and 18 mm.

== Distribution ==
This marine species occurs in the southwest Pacific (Papua New Guinea, New Caledonia, Solomon Islands, Wallis and Futuna).
