= Paziella oregonia =

Scientific classification
- Kingdom: Animalia
- Phylum: Mollusca
- Class: Gastropoda
- Subclass: Caenogastropoda
- Order: Neogastropoda
- Family: Muricidae
- Genus: Paziella
- Species: P. oregonia

Binomial name
- Paziella oregonia (Bullis, 1964)

Synonyms
- Murex oregonia Bullis, 1964 (basionym); Paziella (Paziella) oregonia (Bullis, 1964); Poirieria (Paziella) oregonia (Bullis, 1964)

Species of gastropod

Paziella oregonia is a species of sea snail, a marine gastropod mollusk in the family Muricidae, the murex snails or rock snails.

== Description ==
The size of an adult shell varies between 40 mm and 90 mm.

== Distribution ==
This marine species is distributed from Colombia to Northern Brazil.
