= Bouchetia vaubanensis =

Scientific classification
- Kingdom: Animalia
- Phylum: Mollusca
- Class: Gastropoda
- Subclass: Caenogastropoda
- Order: Neogastropoda
- Family: Muricidae
- Genus: Bouchetia
- Species: B. vaubanensis

Binomial name
- Bouchetia vaubanensis (Houart, 1986)

Synonyms
- Paziella (Bouchetia) vaubanensis (Houart, 1986); Paziella vaubanensis (Houart, 1986); Poirieria (Paziella) vaubanensis Houart, 1986

Species of gastropod

Bouchetia vaubanensis is a species of sea snail, a marine gastropod mollusc in the family Muricidae, the murex snails or rock snails.

== Description ==
The shell grows to a length of 10 mm.

Their functional type is benthos.

Their feeding type is predatory.

== Distribution ==
This marine species can be found off New Caledonia.
