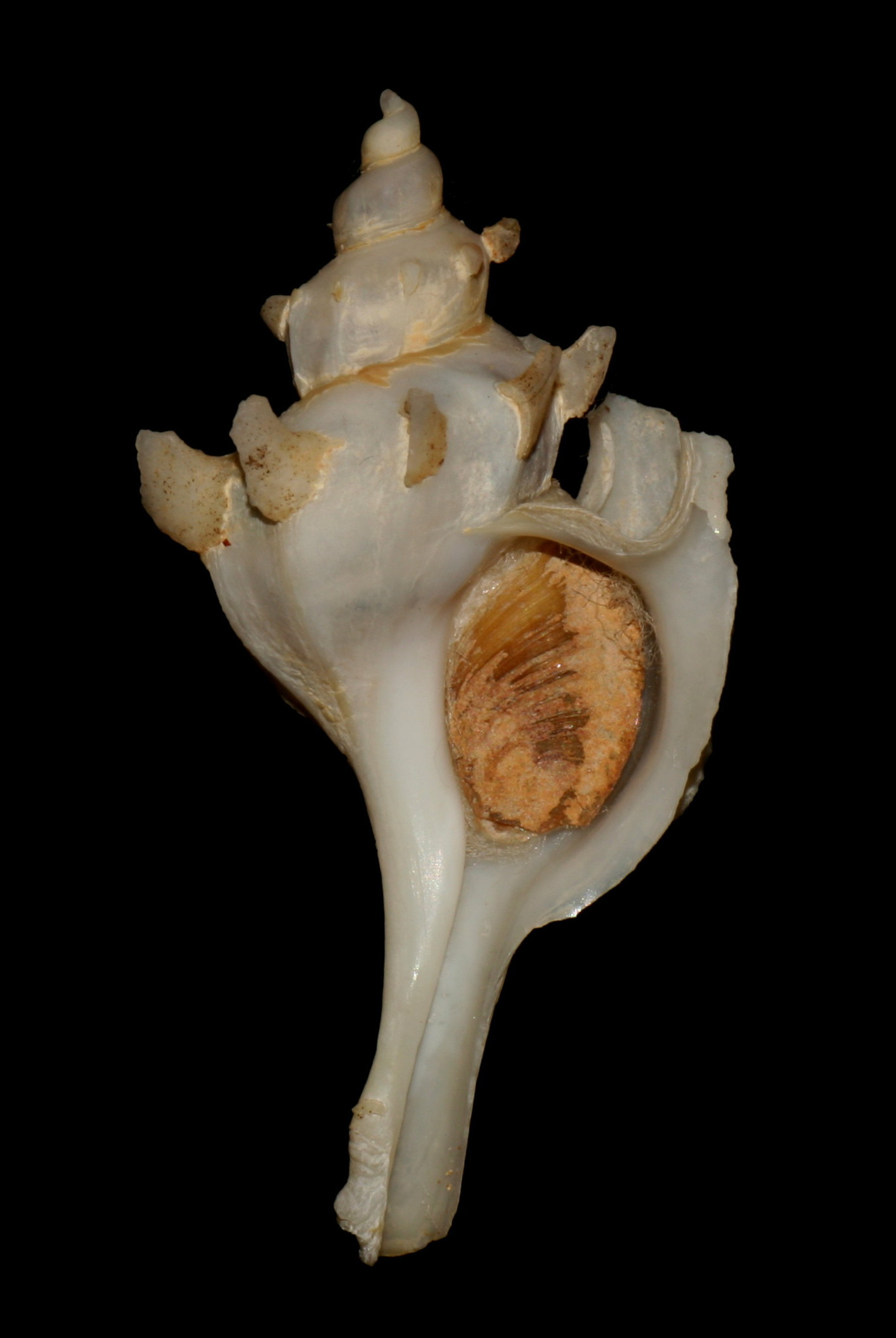
- A shell of Boreotrophon alaskanus Dall, 1902

Scientific classification
- Kingdom: Animalia
- Phylum: Mollusca
- Class: Gastropoda
- Subclass: Caenogastropoda
- Order: Neogastropoda
- Superfamily: Muricoidea
- Family: Muricidae
- Subfamily: Pagodulinae
- Genus: Boreotrophon; P. Fischer, 1884

Type species
- Murex clathratus Linnaeus, 1767

Synonyms
- Trophon (Boreotrophon)

= Boreotrophon =

Genus of gastropods

Boreotrophon is a genus of sea snails, marine gastropod mollusks in the subfamily Pagodulinae of the family Muricidae, the murex snails or rock snails.

== Species ==
Species within the genus Boreotrophon include:

- Boreotrophon alaskanus Dall, 1902
- Boreotrophon alborostratus Is. Taki, 1938
- Boreotrophon albus Egorov, 1992
- Boreotrophon aleuticus Houart, Vermeij & Wiedrick, 2019
- Boreotrophon aomoriensis (Nomura & Hatai, 1940)
- Boreotrophon apolyonis (Dall, 1919)
- Boreotrophon avalonensis Dall, 1902
- Boreotrophon bentleyi Dall, 1908
- Boreotrophon candelabrum (Reeve, 1848)
- Boreotrophon cascadiensis Houart, Vermeij & Wiedrick, 2019
- Boreotrophon cepula (Sowerby II, 1880)
- Boreotrophon clathratus (Linnaeus, 1767)
- Boreotrophon clavatus (Sars, 1878)
- Boreotrophon cordellensis Houart, Vermeij & Wiedrick, 2019
- Boreotrophon cortesianus Houart, Vermeij & Wiedrick, 2019
- Boreotrophon cymatus Dall, 1902
- Boreotrophon dabneyi (Dautzenberg, 1889)
- Boreotrophon disparilis (Dall, 1891)
- Boreotrophon egorovi Houart, 1995
- Boreotrophon eucymatus (Dall, 1902)
- Boreotrophon flos Okutani, 1964
- Boreotrophon gaidenkoi Houart, 1995
- Boreotrophon hazardi McLean, 1996
- Boreotrophon houarti Egorov, 1994
- Boreotrophon kabati McLean, 1996
- Boreotrophon kamchatkanus Dall, 1902
- Boreotrophon keepi (A. M. Strong & Hertlein, 1937)
- Boreotrophon macouni Dall & Bartsch, 1910
- Boreotrophon mazatlanicus Dall, 1902
- Boreotrophon multicostatus (Eschscholtz, 1829)
- Boreotrophon obesus Houart, Vermeij & Wiedrick, 2019
- Boreotrophon okhotensis Egorov, 1993
- Boreotrophon pacificus Dall, 1902
- Boreotrophon pedroanus (Arnold, 1903)
- Boreotrophon pseudotripherus Houart, Vermeij & Wiedrick, 2019
- Boreotrophon pygmaeus Egorov, 1994
- Boreotrophon rotundatus Dall, 1902
- Boreotrophon santarosensis Houart, Vermeij & Wiedrick, 2019
- Boreotrophon subapolyonis Houart, Vermeij & Wiedrick, 2019
- Boreotrophon tannerensis Houart, Vermeij & Wiedrick, 2019
- Boreotrophon tolomius (Dall, 1919)
- Boreotrophon triangulatus (Carpenter, 1864)
- Boreotrophon tripherus Dall, 1902
- Boreotrophon trophonis Egorov, 1993
- Boreotrophon truncatus (Ström, 1768)
- Boreotrophon vancouverensis Houart, Vermeij & Wiedrick, 2019
- Boreotrophon xestra Dall, 1918

Species brought into synonymy

- Boreotrophon abyssorum (A. E. Verrill, 1885): synonym of Pagodula abyssorum (Verrill, 1885)
- Boreotrophon alborostratus Taki, 1938: synonym of Boreotrophon alaskanus Dall, 1902
- Boreotrophon albospinosus Willett, 1931: synonym of Boreotrophon triangulatus (Carpenter, 1864)
- Boreotrophon beringi Dall, 1902: synonym of Boreotrophon cepula (Sowerby, 1880)
- Boreotrophon calliceratus (Dall, 1919): synonym of Boreotrophon avalonensis Dall, 1902
- Boreotrophon cepulus [sic]: synonym of Boreotrophon cepula (Sowerby, 1880)
- Boreotrophon craticulatus (O. Fabricus, 1780): synonym of Scabrotrophon fabricii (Møller, 1842)
- Boreotrophon dalli (Kobelt, 1878): synonym of Nodulotrophon coronatus (H. Adams & A. Adams, 1864)
- Boreotrophon echinus Dall, 1918: synonym of Nipponotrophon echinus (Dall, 1918)
- Boreotrophon elegantulus (Dall, 1907): synonym of Warenia elegantula (Dall, 1907) (original combination)
- Boreotrophon fabricii (Møller, 1842): synonym of Scabrotrophon fabricii (Møller, 1842)
- Boreotrophon golikovi Egorov, 1992: synonym of Pagodula golikovi (Egorov, 1992)
- Boreotrophon gorgon Dall, 1913: synonym of Nipponotrophon gorgon (Dall, 1913)
- Boreotrophon hadalis Sysoev, 1992: synonym of Abyssotrophon hadalis (Sysoev, 1992)
- Boreotrophon ithitomus (Dall, 1919): synonym of Boreotrophon alaskanus Dall, 1902
- Boreotrophon kamchatkanus Dall, 1902: synonym of Scabrotrophon kamchatkanus (Dall, 1902)
- Boreotrophon keepi (Strong & Hertlein, 1937): synonym of Boreotrophon pedroanus (Arnold, 1903)
- Boreotrophon maclaini Dall, 1902: synonym of Oenopota maclaini (Dall, 1902)
- Boreotrophon pagodus Hayashi & Habe, 1965: synonym of Nipponotrophon pagodus (Hayashi & Habe, 1965)
- Boreotrophon pagodus Egorov, 1993: synonym of Boreotrophon houarti Egorov, 1994
- Boreotrophon panamensis Dall, 1902: synonym of Abyssotrophon panamensis (Dall, 1902)
- Boreotrophon paucicostatus Habe & Ito, 1965: synonym of Boreotrophon candelabrum (Reeve, 1848)
- Boreotrophon peregrinus Dall, 1902: synonym of Boreotrophon multicostatus (Eschscholtz, 1829)
- Boreotrophon shirleyi Cernohorsky, 1980: synonym of Metzgeria shirleyi (Cernohorsky, 1980)
- Boreotrophon smithi Dall, 1902: synonym of Nipponotrophon stuarti (E. A. Smith, 1880)
- Boreotrophon staphylinus (Dall, 1919): synonym of Boreotrophon bentleyi Dall, 1908
- Boreotrophon stephanos Taki, 1938: synonym of Boreotrophon candelabrum (Reeve, 1848)
- Boreotrophon stuarti (E.A. Smith, 1880): synonym of Nipponotrophon stuarti (E. A. Smith, 1880)
