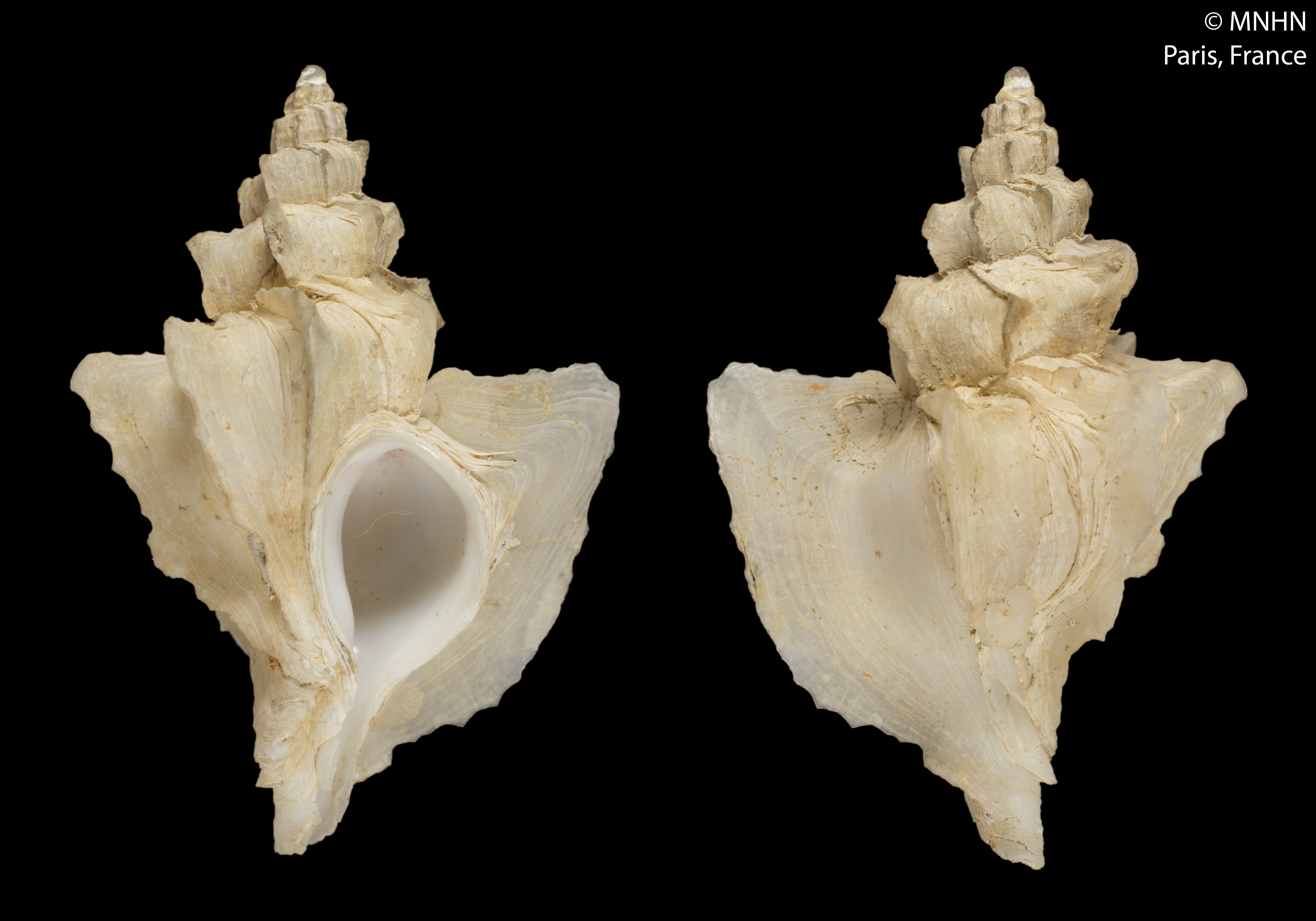
- Shell of Nipponotrophon makassarensis (holotype at MNHN, Paris)

Scientific classification
- Kingdom: Animalia
- Phylum: Mollusca
- Class: Gastropoda
- Subclass: Caenogastropoda
- Order: Neogastropoda
- Superfamily: Muricoidea
- Family: Muricidae
- Subfamily: Trophoninae
- Genus: Nipponotrophon; Kuroda & Habe, 1971

Type species
- Boreotrophon echinus Dall, 1918

= Nipponotrophon =

Genus of gastropods

Nipponotrophon is a genus of sea snails, marine gastropod mollusks in the subfamily Trophoninae of the family Muricidae, the murex snails or rock snails.

== Species ==
Species within the genus Nipponotrophon include:

- Nipponotrophon barbarae Houart & Héros, 2016
- Nipponotrophon echinus (Dall, 1918)
- Nipponotrophon elegantissimus (Shikama, 1971)
- Nipponotrophon exquisitus Houart, Vermeij & Wiedrick, 2019
- Nipponotrophon gorgon (Dall, 1913)
- Nipponotrophon magnificus (Golikov & Sirenko, 1992)
- Nipponotrophon makassarensis Houart, 1984
- Nipponotrophon pagodus (Hayashi & Habe, 1965)
- Nipponotrophon shingoi (Tiba, 1981)

Species brought into synonymy

- Nipponotrophon bondarevi Houart, 1995: synonym of Scabrotrophon bondarevi (Houart, 1995) (original combination)
- Nipponotrophon elongatus (Hu & Lee, 1991): synonym of Nipponotrophon elegantissimus (Shikama, 1971)
- Nipponotrophon jungi K.-Y. Lai, 2008: synonym of Scabrotrophon chunfui Houart & Lan, 2001
- Nipponotrophon regina Houart, 1986: synonym of Scabrotrophon regina (Houart, 1986) (original combination)
- Nipponotrophon scitulus (Dall, 1891): synonym of Scabrotrophon scitulus (Dall, 1891)
- Nipponotrophon stuarti (E. A. Smith, 1880): synonym of Scabrotrophon stuarti (E. A. Smith, 1880)
