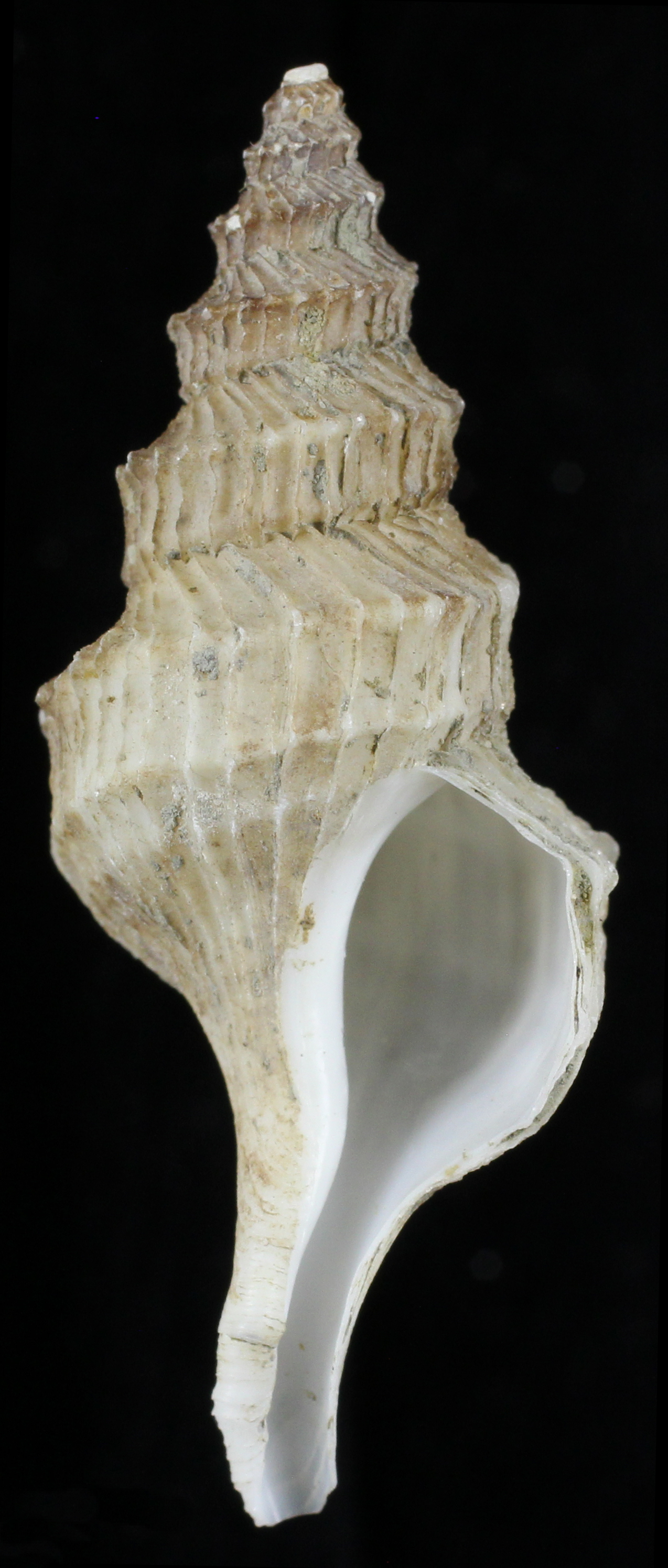
- Shell of Abyssotrophon soyoae

Scientific classification
- Kingdom: Animalia
- Phylum: Mollusca
- Class: Gastropoda
- Subclass: Caenogastropoda
- Order: Neogastropoda
- Family: Muricidae
- Subfamily: Pagodulinae
- Genus: Abyssotrophon; Egorov, 1993

Type species
- Abyssotrophon ruthenicus Egorov, 1993

= Abyssotrophon =

Genus of gastropods

Abyssotrophon is a genus of sea snails, marine gastropod mollusks in the family Muricidae, the murex snails or rock snails.

== Species ==
Species within the genus Abyssotrophon include:

- Abyssotrophon christae Egorov, 1993
- Abyssotrophon crystallinus (Kuroda, 1953)
- Abyssotrophon delicatus (Kuroda, 1953)
- Abyssotrophon edzoevi Egorov, 1994
- Abyssotrophon fusiformis Houart, Vermeij & Wiedrick, 2019
- Abyssotrophon hadalis (Sysoev, 1992)
- Abyssotrophon hubbsi (Rokop, 1972)
- Abyssotrophon ivanovi Egorov, 1993
- Abyssotrophon lorenzoensis (Durham, 1942)
- Abyssotrophon minimus (Okutani, 1964)
- Abyssotrophon multicostatus Golikov & Sirenko, 1992
- Abyssotrophon newmani Houart, Vermeij & Wiedrick, 2019
- Abyssotrophon odisseyi (Golikov & Sirenko, 1992)
- Abyssotrophon panamensis (Dall, 1902)
- Abyssotrophon ruthenicus Egorov, 1993
- Abyssotrophon soyoae (Okutani, 1959)
- Abyssotrophon teratus Egorov, 1993
- Abyssotrophon weijencheni Houart & Buge, 2022

Species brought into synonymy

- Abyssotrophon convexus Egorov, 1994: synonym of Abyssotrophon delicatus (Kuroda, 1953)
- Abyssotrophon drygalskii (Thiele, 1912): synonym of Trophon drygalskii Thiele, 1912
- Abyssotrophon longisiphon Egorov, 1993 : synonym of Abyssotrophon soyoae (Okutani, 1959)
- Abyssotrophon tricostatus Egorov, 1993 : synonym of Abyssotrophon soyoae (Okutani, 1959)
- Abyssotrophon unicus Egorov, 1993 : synonym of Abyssotrophon delicatus (Kuroda, 1953)
