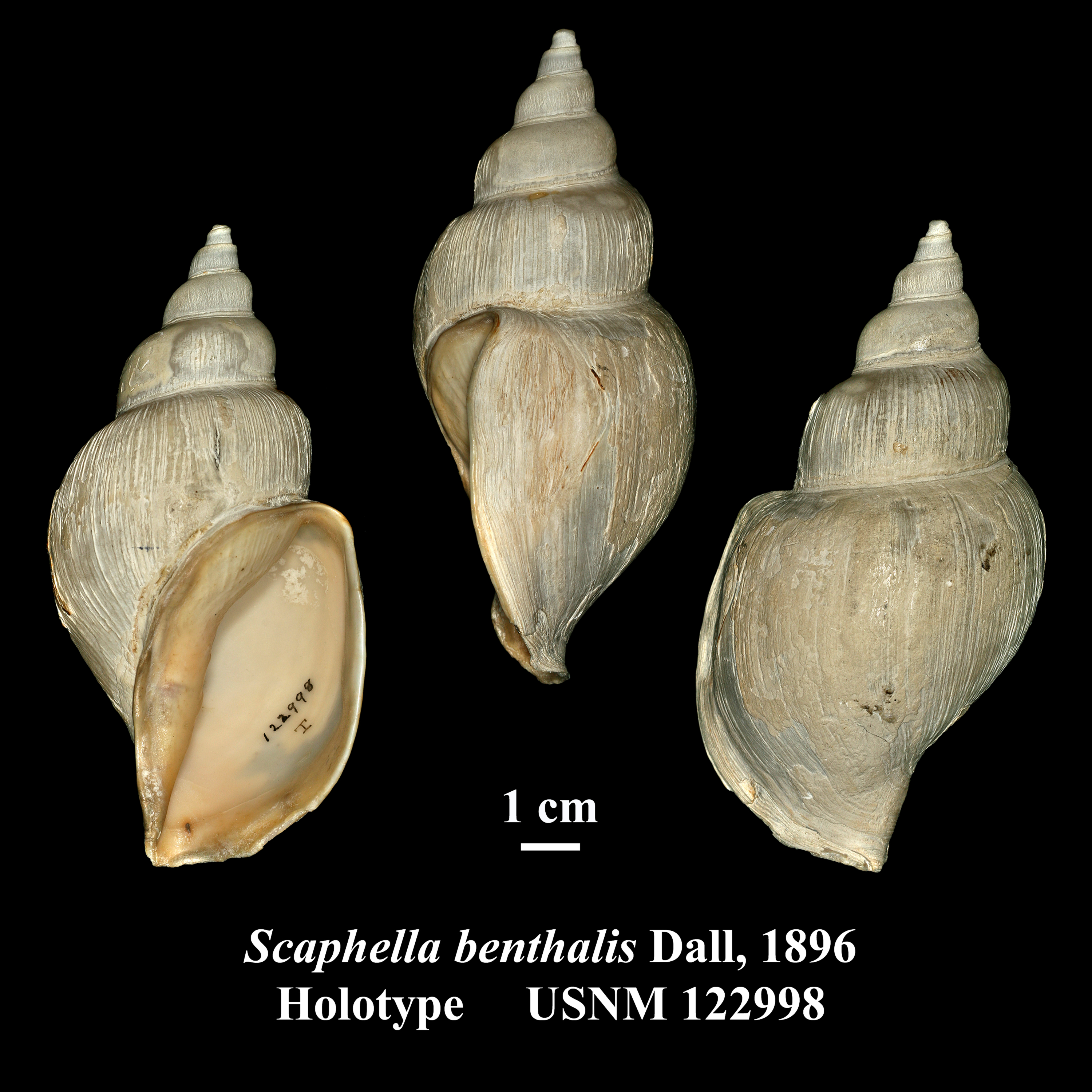
- Shell of Arctomelon benthale

Scientific classification
- Kingdom: Animalia
- Phylum: Mollusca
- Class: Gastropoda
- Subclass: Caenogastropoda
- Order: Neogastropoda
- Family: Volutidae
- Subfamily: Cymbiinae
- Genus: Arctomelon; Dall, 1915

Type species
- Voluta stearnsii Dall, 1872

Synonyms
- Boromelon Dall, 1942; Fulgoraria (Arctomelon) Dall, 1915 (original rank); Fulgoraria (Boreomelon) Dall, 1918 junior objective synonym

= Arctomelon =

Genus of gastropods

Arctomelon is a genus of sea snails, marine gastropod mollusks in the family Volutidae.

These are Large, deep-water Volute snails found in cold North Pacific waters

== Species ==
Species within the genus Arctomelon include:

- Arctomelon benthale (Dall, 1896)
- Arctomelon boreale Roger N. Clark, 2018
- † Arctomelon harasewychi Oleinik, 1996
- † Arctomelon lautenschlageri (Volobueva, 1981)
- † Arctomelon rateginense Oleinik, 1996
- Arctomelon ryosukei (Habe & Ito, 1965)
- Arctomelon stearnsii (Dall, 1872)
- Arctomelon tamikoae (Kosuge, 1970)

Species brought into synonymy

- Arctomelon paucicostatus [sic] : synonym of Boreotrophon paucicostatus Habe & Ito, 1965: synonym of Boreotrophon candelabrum (Reeve, 1848)
