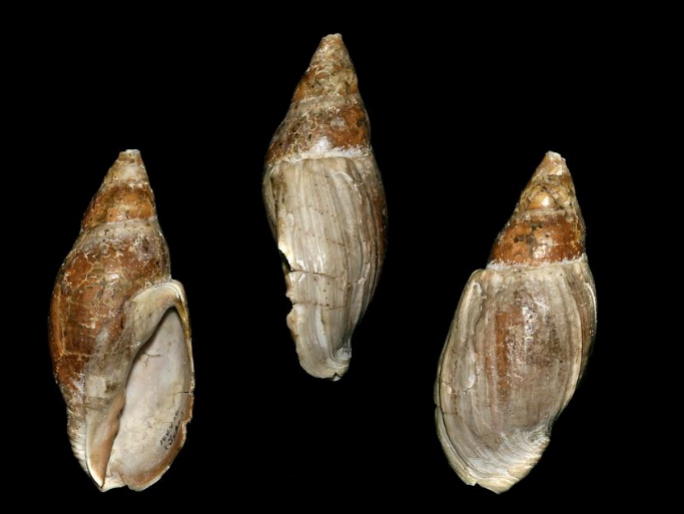
- Shell of Arctomelon stearnsii (specimen at the Smithsonian Institution)

Scientific classification
- Kingdom: Animalia
- Phylum: Mollusca
- Class: Gastropoda
- Subclass: Caenogastropoda
- Order: Neogastropoda
- Family: Volutidae
- Genus: Arctomelon
- Species: A. stearnsii

Binomial name
- Arctomelon stearnsii (Dall, 1872)

Synonyms
- Arctomelon stearnsii stearnsii (Dall, 1872) (no subspecies recognized); Boreomelon stearnsii (Dall, 1872) superseded combination; Voluta (Scaphella) stearnsii Dall, 1872; Voluta stearnsii Dall, 1872 (basionym)

= Arctomelon stearnsii =

Species of gastropod

Arctomelon stearnsii, common name Stearns' melon shell, is a species of sea snail, a marine gastropod mollusk in the family Volutidae, the volutes. The species is divided into two subspecies:

Subspecies

- Arctomelon stearnsii ryosukei Habe & Ito, 1965: synonym of Arctomelon ryosukei (T. Habe & Ki. Ito, 1965) ( superseded rank)
- Arctomelon stearnsii stearnsii (Dall, 1872): synonym of Arctomelon stearnsii (Dall, 1872) (no subspecies recognized)

== Description ==
The length of the shell varies between 160 mm and 174 mm.

(Original description) The shell is large, slender, spindle-shaped, and moderately thick. There are 6-8 whorls. Its colour is livid purple, more or less obscured by an ashy-white outer layer, which is more conspicuous near the sutures and on the callosity of the inner lip. The exterior is smooth (but not polished), except for the strong lines of increase. The sutures are appressed. The siphonal fasciole is strong. The protoconch is small, white, and mammillated. The aperture is more than half as long as the shell, and it is white and livid purple, with a dash of brighter purple at the posterior notch and on the anterior portion of the callus. Its edge is white. The callus is reflected, thick, and strong, with a chink behind the anterior portion. The siphonal canal is twisted to the right and is moderately deep.

== Distribution ==
This deep-water species occurs in the North Pacific off Alaska, the Bering Sea and down to parts of the Japanese coast.
