= Tritonium =

Scientific classification
- Kingdom: Animalia
- Phylum: Mollusca
- Class: Gastropoda
- Subclass: Caenogastropoda
- Order: Neogastropoda
- Family: Cancellariidae
- Genus: Tritonium; O.F. Muller, 1776

Genus of gastropods

Tritonium is a genus of sea snails, marine gastropod mollusks in the family Cancellariidae, commonly known as the nutmeg snails.

The genus name Tritonium has been given twice to species with a different type species :

- Tritonium O.F. Müller, 1776 : type species Buccinum undatum Linnaeus, 1758 (given by Stewart in 1926); this makes this name an objective synonym of Buccinum.
- Tritonium Röding, 1798 : type species : Murex tritonis Linnaeus, 1758 (given by Cossman in 1903); this makes this name an objective synonym of Charonia Gistel, 1847.

Neither of these original names is valid. Confusion increased when, during the 18th and 19th century, authors added species but didn't specify to which Tritonium they belonged. The authors of the World Register of Marine Species (WoRMS) have arbitrarily attributed the species now placed in Buccinidae, Muricidae, and other neogastropod families, to Tritonium O.F. Müller, 1776. The species now placed in Ranellidae and Bursidae, have been attributed to Tritonium Röding, 1798.

== Species ==
Some of the species that used to be included within the genus Tritonium :

- Tritonium clathratus (Linnaeus, 1767): synonym off Boreotrophon clathratus (Linnaeus, 1767)
- Tritonium submuricatum Schrenck, 1862: (species inquirenda)
