= Boreotrophon cymatus =

Scientific classification
- Kingdom: Animalia
- Phylum: Mollusca
- Class: Gastropoda
- Subclass: Caenogastropoda
- Order: Neogastropoda
- Family: Muricidae
- Genus: Boreotrophon
- Species: B. cymatus

Binomial name
- Boreotrophon cymatus Dall, 1902

Species of gastropod

Boreotrophon cymatus is a species of sea snail, a marine gastropod mollusk in the family Muricidae, the murex snails or rock snails.
