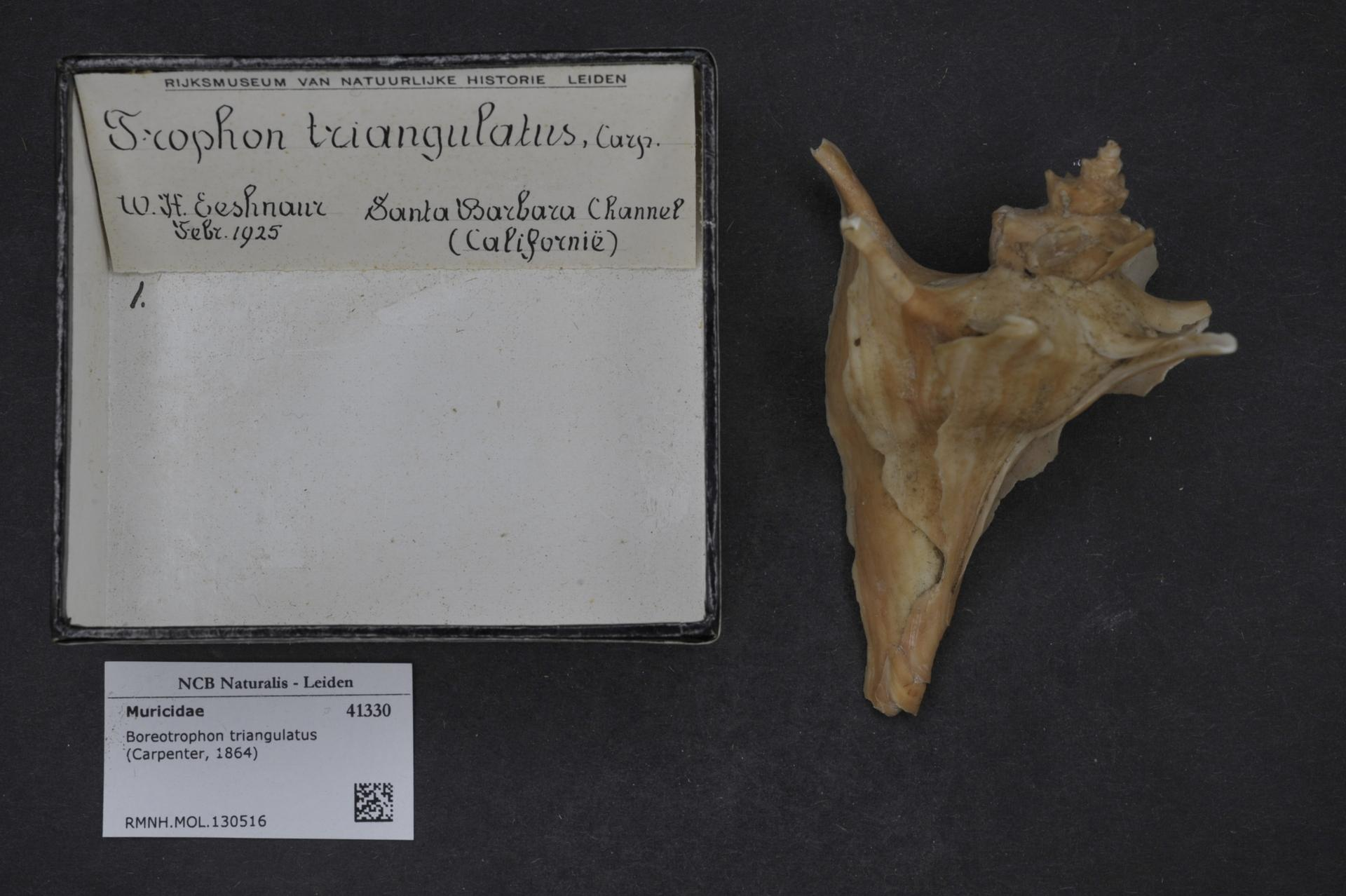

Scientific classification
- Kingdom: Animalia
- Phylum: Mollusca
- Class: Gastropoda
- Subclass: Caenogastropoda
- Order: Neogastropoda
- Family: Muricidae
- Genus: Boreotrophon
- Species: B. triangulatus

Binomial name
- Boreotrophon triangulatus (Carpenter, 1864)

Synonyms
- Boreotrophon albospinosus Willett, 1931; Trophon triangulatus Carpenter, 1864

= Boreotrophon triangulatus =

Species of gastropod

Boreotrophon triangulatus is a species of sea snail, a marine gastropod mollusk in the family Muricidae, the murex snails or rock snails.
