= Boreotrophon aomoriensis =

Scientific classification
- Kingdom: Animalia
- Phylum: Mollusca
- Class: Gastropoda
- Subclass: Caenogastropoda
- Order: Neogastropoda
- Family: Muricidae
- Genus: Boreotrophon
- Species: B. aomoriensis

Binomial name
- Boreotrophon aomoriensis (Nomura & Hatai, 1940)

Synonyms
- Trophon (Boreotrophon) aomoriensis Nomura & Hatai, 1940

Species of gastropod

Boreotrophon aomoriensis is a species of sea snail, a marine gastropod mollusk in the family Muricidae, the murex snails or rock snails.

== Distribution ==
Offshore Hokkaido, Japan.
