= Boreotrophon houarti =

Scientific classification
- Kingdom: Animalia
- Phylum: Mollusca
- Class: Gastropoda
- Subclass: Caenogastropoda
- Order: Neogastropoda
- Family: Muricidae
- Genus: Boreotrophon
- Species: B. houarti

Binomial name
- Boreotrophon houarti Egorov, 1994

Synonyms
- Boreotrophon pagodus Egorov, 1993

Species of gastropod

Boreotrophon houarti is a species of sea snail in the family Muricidae.
