= Abyssotrophon odisseyi =

Scientific classification
- Kingdom: Animalia
- Phylum: Mollusca
- Class: Gastropoda
- Subclass: Caenogastropoda
- Order: Neogastropoda
- Family: Muricidae
- Genus: Abyssotrophon
- Species: A. odisseyi

Binomial name
- Abyssotrophon odisseyi (Golikov & Sirenko, 1992)

Synonyms
- Trophonopsis odisseyi Golikov & Sirenko, 1992

Species of gastropod

Abyssotrophon odisseyi is a species of sea snail, a marine gastropod mollusc in the family Muricidae, the murex snails or rock snails.
