= Boreotrophon disparilis =

Scientific classification
- Kingdom: Animalia
- Phylum: Mollusca
- Class: Gastropoda
- Subclass: Caenogastropoda
- Order: Neogastropoda
- Family: Muricidae
- Genus: Boreotrophon
- Species: B. disparilis

Binomial name
- Boreotrophon disparilis (Dall, 1891)

Synonyms
- Trophon (Boreotrophon) disparilis Dall, 1891

Species of gastropod

Boreotrophon disparilis is a species of sea snail, a marine gastropod mollusk in the family Muricidae, the murex snails or rock snails.
