= Boreotrophon egorovi =

Scientific classification
- Kingdom: Animalia
- Phylum: Mollusca
- Class: Gastropoda
- Subclass: Caenogastropoda
- Order: Neogastropoda
- Family: Muricidae
- Genus: Boreotrophon
- Species: B. egorovi

Binomial name
- Boreotrophon egorovi Houart, 1995

Species of gastropod

Preserved boreotrophon egorovi shell

Boreotrophon egorovi is a species of sea snail, a marine gastropod mollusk in the family Muricidae, the murex snails or rock snails.
