= Boreotrophon bentleyi =

Scientific classification
- Kingdom: Animalia
- Phylum: Mollusca
- Class: Gastropoda
- Subclass: Caenogastropoda
- Order: Neogastropoda
- Family: Muricidae
- Genus: Boreotrophon
- Species: B. bentleyi

Binomial name
- Boreotrophon bentleyi Dall, 1908

Synonyms
- Neptunea staphylina Dall, 1919

Species of gastropod

Boreotrophon bentleyi is a species of sea snail, a marine gastropod mollusk in the family Muricidae, the murex snails or rock snails.
