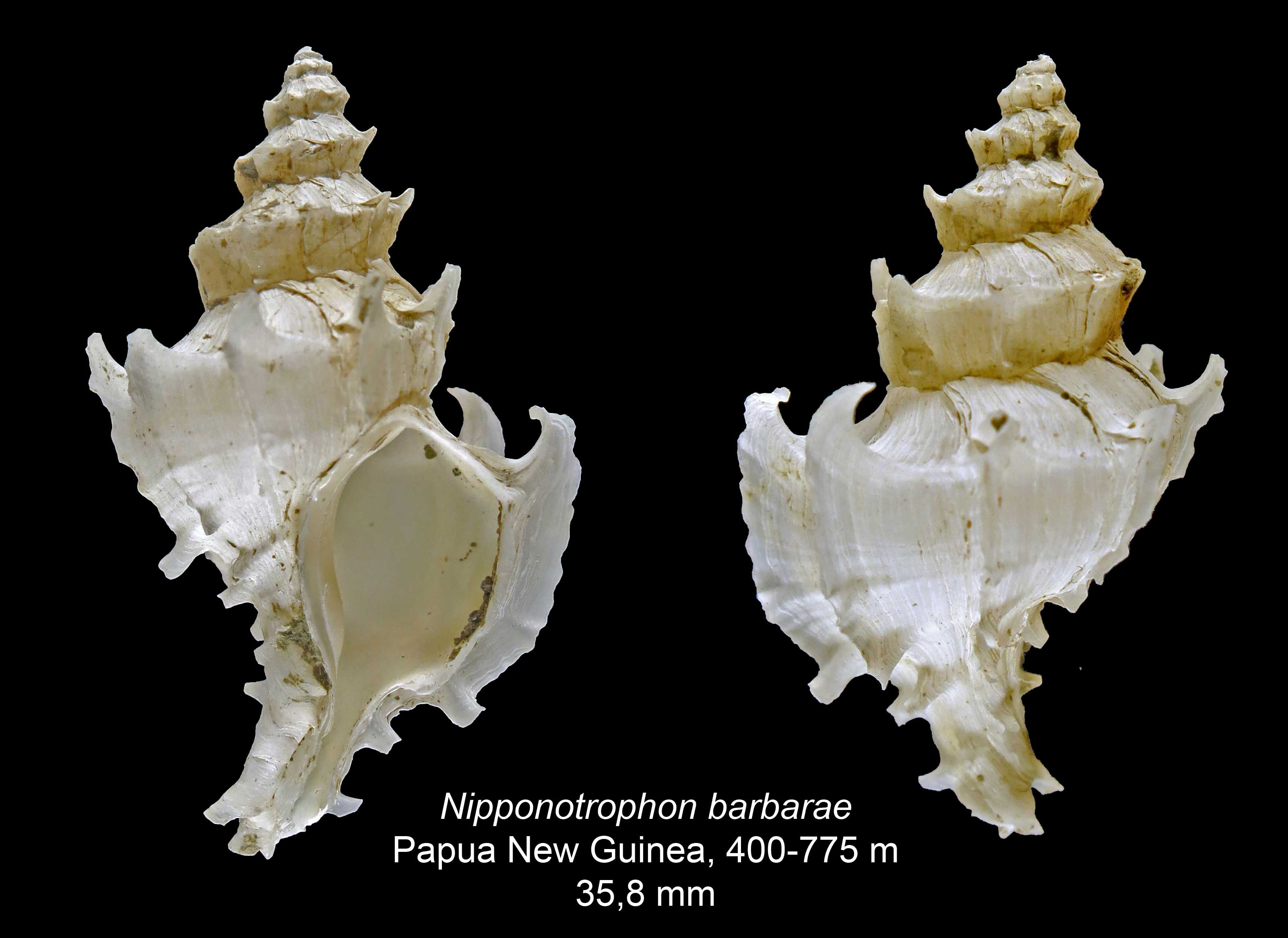
- Nipponotrophon barbarae (MNHN-IM-2000-31003)

Scientific classification
- Kingdom: Animalia
- Phylum: Mollusca
- Class: Gastropoda
- Subclass: Caenogastropoda
- Order: Neogastropoda
- Superfamily: Muricoidea
- Family: Muricidae
- Subfamily: Trophoninae
- Genus: Nipponotrophon
- Species: N. barbarae

Binomial name
- Nipponotrophon barbarae Houart & Héros, 2016

= Nipponotrophon barbarae =

Species of gastropod

Nipponotrophon barbarae is a species of sea snail, a marine gastropod mollusk, in the family Muricidae, the murex snails or rock snails.

== Distribution ==
This marine species occurs off Papua New Guinea.
