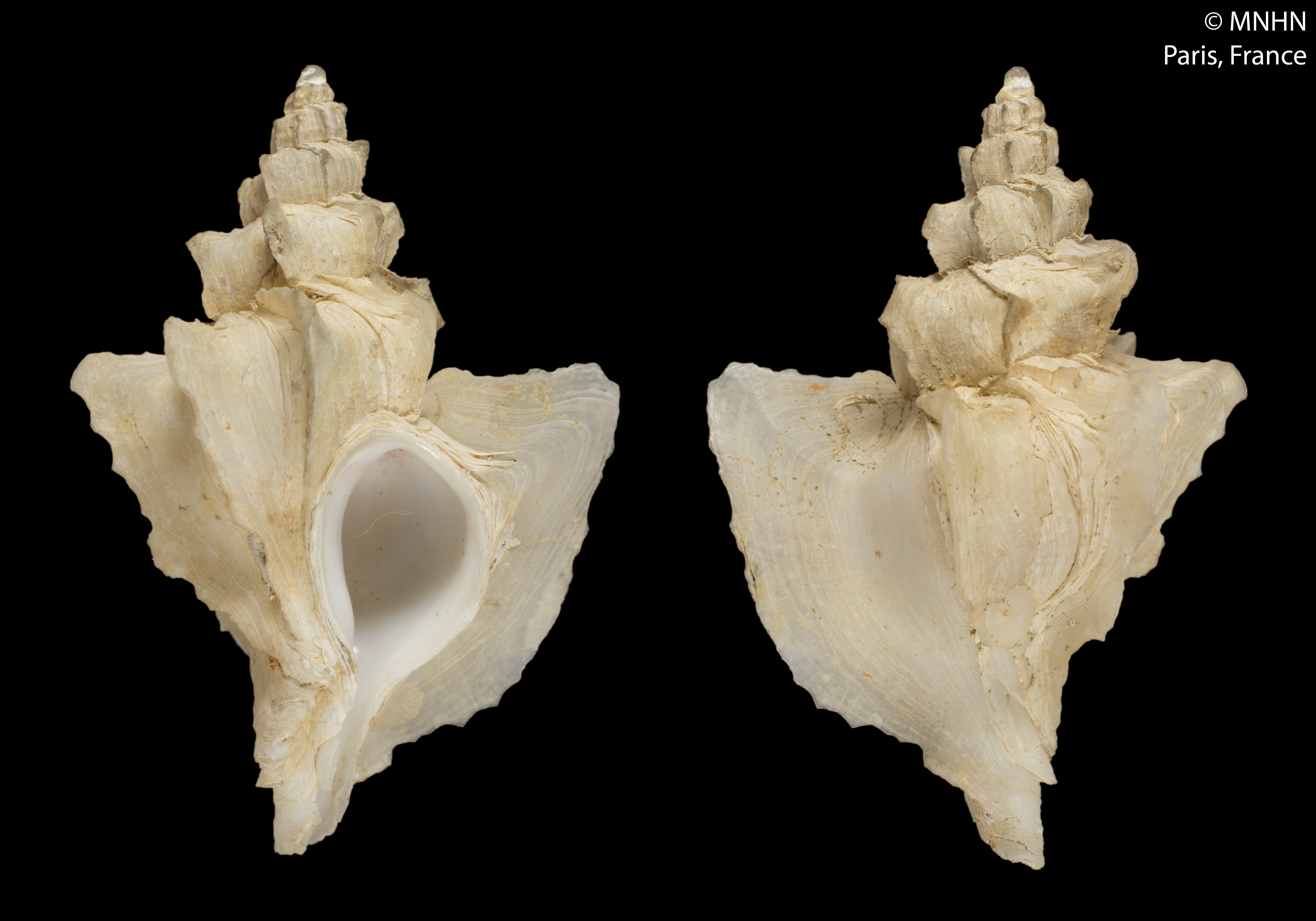
- Shell of Nipponotrophon makassarensis (holotype at MNHN, Paris)

Scientific classification
- Kingdom: Animalia
- Phylum: Mollusca
- Class: Gastropoda
- Subclass: Caenogastropoda
- Order: Neogastropoda
- Family: Muricidae
- Genus: Nipponotrophon
- Species: N. makassarensis

Binomial name
- Nipponotrophon makassarensis Houart, 1985

= Nipponotrophon makassarensis =

Species of gastropod

Nipponotrophon makassarensis is a species of sea snail, a marine gastropod mollusk in the family Muricidae, the murex snails or rock snails.

== Description ==
The length of the shell attains 37.5 mm.

== Distribution ==
This marine species occurs off Indonesia.
