= Boreotrophon clavatus =

Scientific classification
- Kingdom: Animalia
- Phylum: Mollusca
- Class: Gastropoda
- Subclass: Caenogastropoda
- Order: Neogastropoda
- Family: Muricidae
- Genus: Boreotrophon
- Species: B. clavatus

Binomial name
- Boreotrophon clavatus (Sars, 1878)

Synonyms
- Trophon clavatus Sars, 1878; Trophonopsis clavatus Sars, GO, 1879

Species of gastropod

Boreotrophon clavatus is a species of sea snail, a marine gastropod mollusk in the family Muricidae.
