= Tritonium submuricatum =

Scientific classification
- Kingdom: Animalia
- Phylum: Mollusca
- Class: Gastropoda
- Subclass: Caenogastropoda
- Order: Neogastropoda
- Family: Cancellariidae
- Genus: Tritonium
- Species: T. submuricatum

Binomial name
- Tritonium submuricatum Schrenck, 1862

Species of gastropod

Tritonium submuricatum is a species of sea snail, a marine gastropod mollusk in the family Cancellariidae, the nutmeg snails.

As the genus name Tritonium is no longer accepted, this species name has become a "species inquirenda".
