= Boreotrophon pedroanus =

Scientific classification
- Kingdom: Animalia
- Phylum: Mollusca
- Class: Gastropoda
- Subclass: Caenogastropoda
- Order: Neogastropoda
- Family: Muricidae
- Genus: Boreotrophon
- Species: B. pedroanus

Binomial name
- Boreotrophon pedroanus (Arnold, 1903)

Synonyms
- Boreotrophon keepi (Strong & Hertlein, 1937); Trophon (Boreotrophon) pedroana Arnold, 1903; Trophon (Boreotrophon) stuarti var. praecursor Arnold, 1903; Trophon (Trophonopsis) keepi (Strong & Hertlein, 1937); Trophonopsis keepi (Strong & Hertlein, 1937)

Species of gastropod

Boreotrophon pedroanus is a species of sea snail, a marine gastropod mollusk in the family Muricidae, the murex snails or rock snails.

== Distribution ==
This species occurs in the Pacific Ocean from California, USA - Baja California, Mexico
