= Abyssotrophon delicatus =

Scientific classification
- Kingdom: Animalia
- Phylum: Mollusca
- Class: Gastropoda
- Subclass: Caenogastropoda
- Order: Neogastropoda
- Family: Muricidae
- Genus: Abyssotrophon
- Species: A. delicatus

Binomial name
- Abyssotrophon delicatus (Kuroda, 1953)

Synonyms
- Abyssotrophon convexus Egorov, 1994; Abyssotrophon unicus Egorov, 1993; Trophonopsis delicatus Kuroda, 1953

Species of gastropod

Abyssotrophon delicatus is a species of sea snail, a marine gastropod mollusc in the family Muricidae, the murex snails or rock snails.

== Description ==
The shell of an adult shell varies between 6 mm and 12 mm.

== Distribution ==
This species occurs in the Pacific Ocean off Japan.
