= Boreotrophon keepi =

Scientific classification
- Kingdom: Animalia
- Phylum: Mollusca
- Class: Gastropoda
- Subclass: Caenogastropoda
- Order: Neogastropoda
- Superfamily: Muricoidea
- Family: Muricidae
- Subfamily: Pagodulinae
- Genus: Boreotrophon
- Species: B. keepi

Binomial name
- Boreotrophon keepi (A. M. Strong & Hertlein, 1937)

Species of gastropod

Boreotrophon keepi is a species of sea snail, a marine gastropod mollusk, in the family Muricidae, the murex snails or rock snails.
