= Abyssotrophon lorenzoensis =

Scientific classification
- Kingdom: Animalia
- Phylum: Mollusca
- Class: Gastropoda
- Subclass: Caenogastropoda
- Order: Neogastropoda
- Family: Muricidae
- Genus: Abyssotrophon
- Species: A. lorenzoensis

Binomial name
- Abyssotrophon lorenzoensis (Durham, 1942)

Synonyms
- Trophon lorenzoensis Durham, 1942

Species of gastropod

Abyssotrophon lorenzoensis is a species of sea snail, a marine gastropod mollusc in the family Muricidae, the murex snails or rock snails.
