= Boreotrophon pacificus =

Scientific classification
- Kingdom: Animalia
- Phylum: Mollusca
- Class: Gastropoda
- Subclass: Caenogastropoda
- Order: Neogastropoda
- Family: Muricidae
- Genus: Boreotrophon
- Species: B. pacificus

Binomial name
- Boreotrophon pacificus Dall, 1902

Species of gastropod

Boreotrophon pacificus is a species of sea snail, a marine gastropod mollusk in the family Muricidae, the murex snails or rock snails.
