= Boreotrophon kamchatkanus =

Scientific classification
- Kingdom: Animalia
- Phylum: Mollusca
- Class: Gastropoda
- Subclass: Caenogastropoda
- Order: Neogastropoda
- Family: Muricidae
- Genus: Boreotrophon
- Species: B. kamchatkanus

Binomial name
- Boreotrophon kamchatkanus (Dall, 1902)

Synonyms
- Scabrotrophon kamchatkanus (Dall, 1902); Trophonopsis kamchatkanus (Dall, 1902); Trophonopsis nana Egorov, 1994

Species of gastropod

Boreotrophon kamchatkanus is a species of sea snail, a marine gastropod mollusk in the family Muricidae, the murex snails or rock snails.

== Distribution ==
This marine species occurs off the Kamchatka Peninsula.
