= Boreotrophon pygmaeus =

Scientific classification
- Kingdom: Animalia
- Phylum: Mollusca
- Class: Gastropoda
- Subclass: Caenogastropoda
- Order: Neogastropoda
- Superfamily: Muricoidea
- Family: Muricidae
- Subfamily: Pagodulinae
- Genus: Boreotrophon
- Species: B. pygmaeus

Binomial name
- Boreotrophon pygmaeus Egorov, 1994

Species of gastropod

Boreotrophon pygmaeus is a species of sea snail, a marine gastropod mollusk, in the family Muricidae, the murex snails or rock snails.
