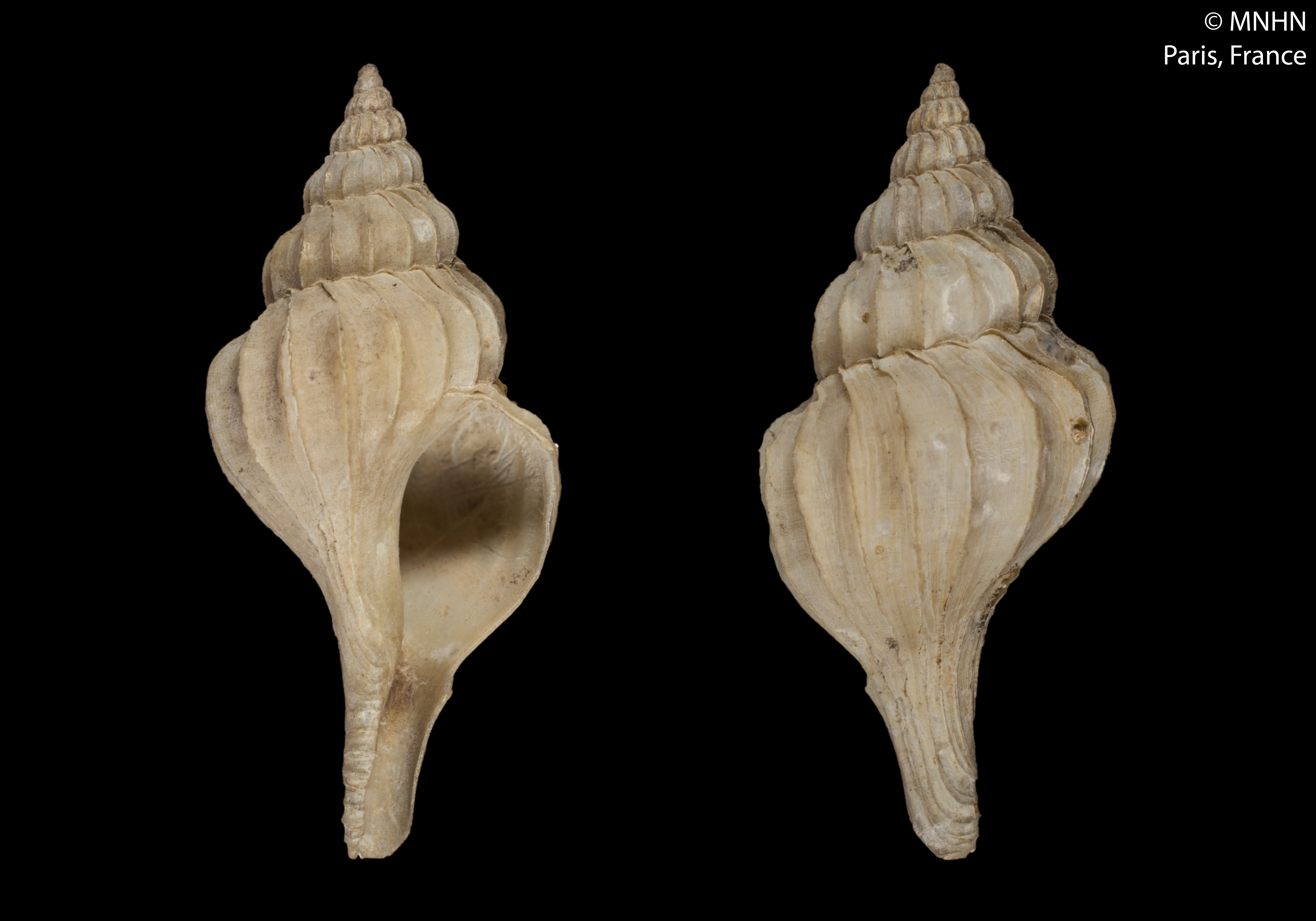

Scientific classification
- Kingdom: Animalia
- Phylum: Mollusca
- Class: Gastropoda
- Subclass: Caenogastropoda
- Order: Neogastropoda
- Family: Muricidae
- Genus: Boreotrophon
- Species: B. dabneyi

Binomial name
- Boreotrophon dabneyi (Dautzenberg, 1889)

Synonyms
- Trophon dabneyi Dautzenberg, 1889; Trophon dabneyi var. lanceolata Locard, 1897; Trophon dabneyi var. minor Locard, 1897; Trophon decoratus Locard, 1897; Trophon decoratus var. lanceolata Locard, 1897 (synonym); Trophon decoratus var. minor Locard, 1897

= Boreotrophon dabneyi =

Species of gastropod

Boreotrophon dabneyi is a species of sea snail, a marine gastropod mollusc in the family Muricidae, the murex snails or rock snails.

== Distribution ==
This marine species occurs off the Azores.
