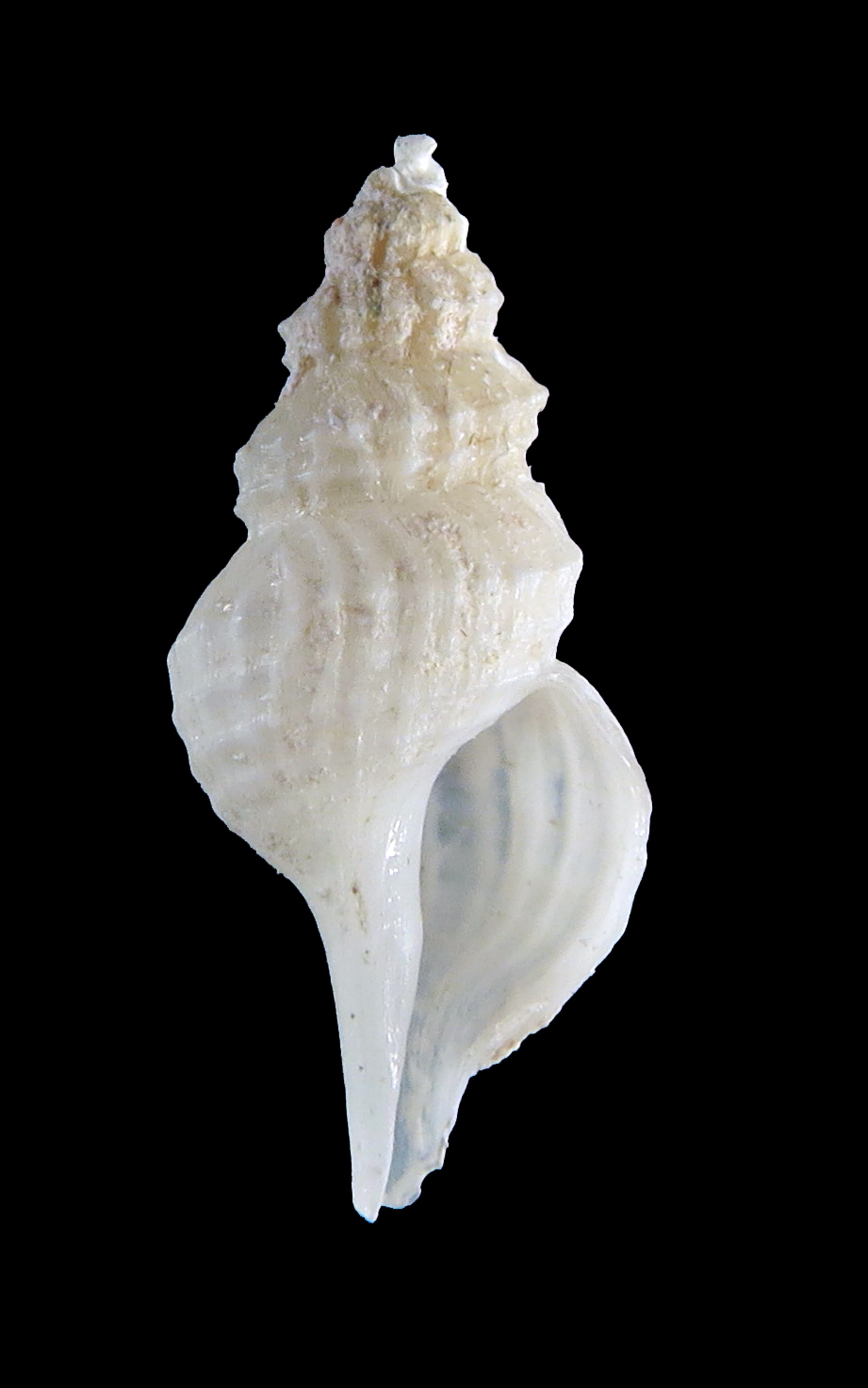
- Shell of Abyssotrophon weijencheni (holotype at MNHN, Paris)

Scientific classification
- Kingdom: Animalia
- Phylum: Mollusca
- Class: Gastropoda
- Subclass: Caenogastropoda
- Order: Neogastropoda
- Family: Muricidae
- Genus: Abyssotrophon
- Species: A. weijencheni

Binomial name
- Abyssotrophon weijencheni Houart & Buge, 2022

= Abyssotrophon weijencheni =

Species of gastropod

Abyssotrophon weijencheni is a species of sea snail, a marine gastropod mollusc in the subfamily Pagodulinae of the family Muricidae, the murex snails or rock snails.

== Distribution ==
This bathyal marine species occurs in the South China Sea at depths between 1,205 m and 1,389 m.
