= Nipponotrophon elegantissimus =

Scientific classification
- Kingdom: Animalia
- Phylum: Mollusca
- Class: Gastropoda
- Subclass: Caenogastropoda
- Order: Neogastropoda
- Family: Muricidae
- Genus: Nipponotrophon
- Species: N. elegantissimus

Binomial name
- Nipponotrophon elegantissimus (Shikama, 1971)

Synonyms
- Nipponotrophon elongatus (C.-H. Hu & X.-F. Lee, 1991); Trophon elongatus Hu & Lee, 1991; Trophonopsis (Austrotrophon) elegantissima Shikama, 1971

Species of gastropod

Nipponotrophon elegantissimus is a species of sea snail, a marine gastropod mollusk in the family Muricidae, the murex snails or rock snails.
