= Boreotrophon cepula =

Scientific classification
- Kingdom: Animalia
- Phylum: Mollusca
- Class: Gastropoda
- Subclass: Caenogastropoda
- Order: Neogastropoda
- Family: Muricidae
- Genus: Boreotrophon
- Species: B. cepula

Binomial name
- Boreotrophon cepula (Sowerby, 1880)

Synonyms
- Boreotrophon beringi Dall, 1902; Fusus lamellosus Gray, 1839; Trophon cepula Sowerby, 1880

Species of gastropod

Boreotrophon cepula is a species of sea snail, a marine gastropod mollusk in the family Muricidae, the murex snails or rock snails.
