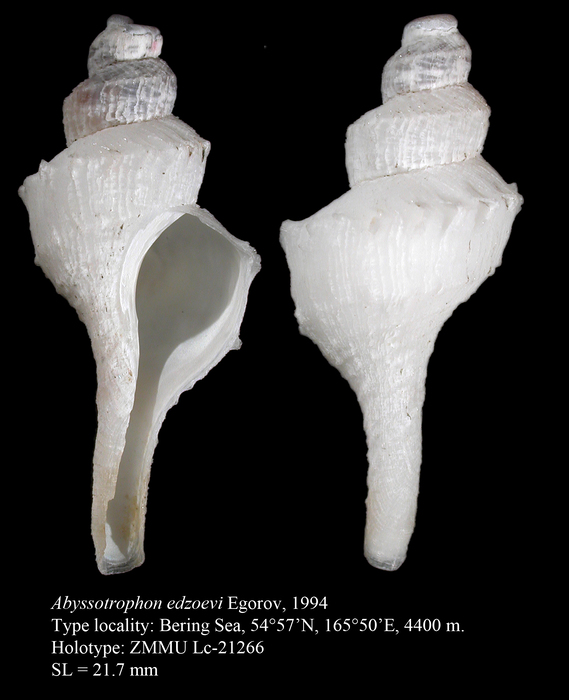
- The front and back of an Abyssotrophon Edzoevi

Scientific classification
- Kingdom: Animalia
- Phylum: Mollusca
- Class: Gastropoda
- Subclass: Caenogastropoda
- Order: Neogastropoda
- Family: Muricidae
- Genus: Abyssotrophon
- Species: A. edzoevi

Binomial name
- Abyssotrophon edzoevi Egorov, 1994

= Abyssotrophon edzoevi =

Species of gastropod

Abyssotrophon edzoevi is a species of sea snail, a marine gastropod mollusc in the family Muricidae, the murex snails or rock snails.
