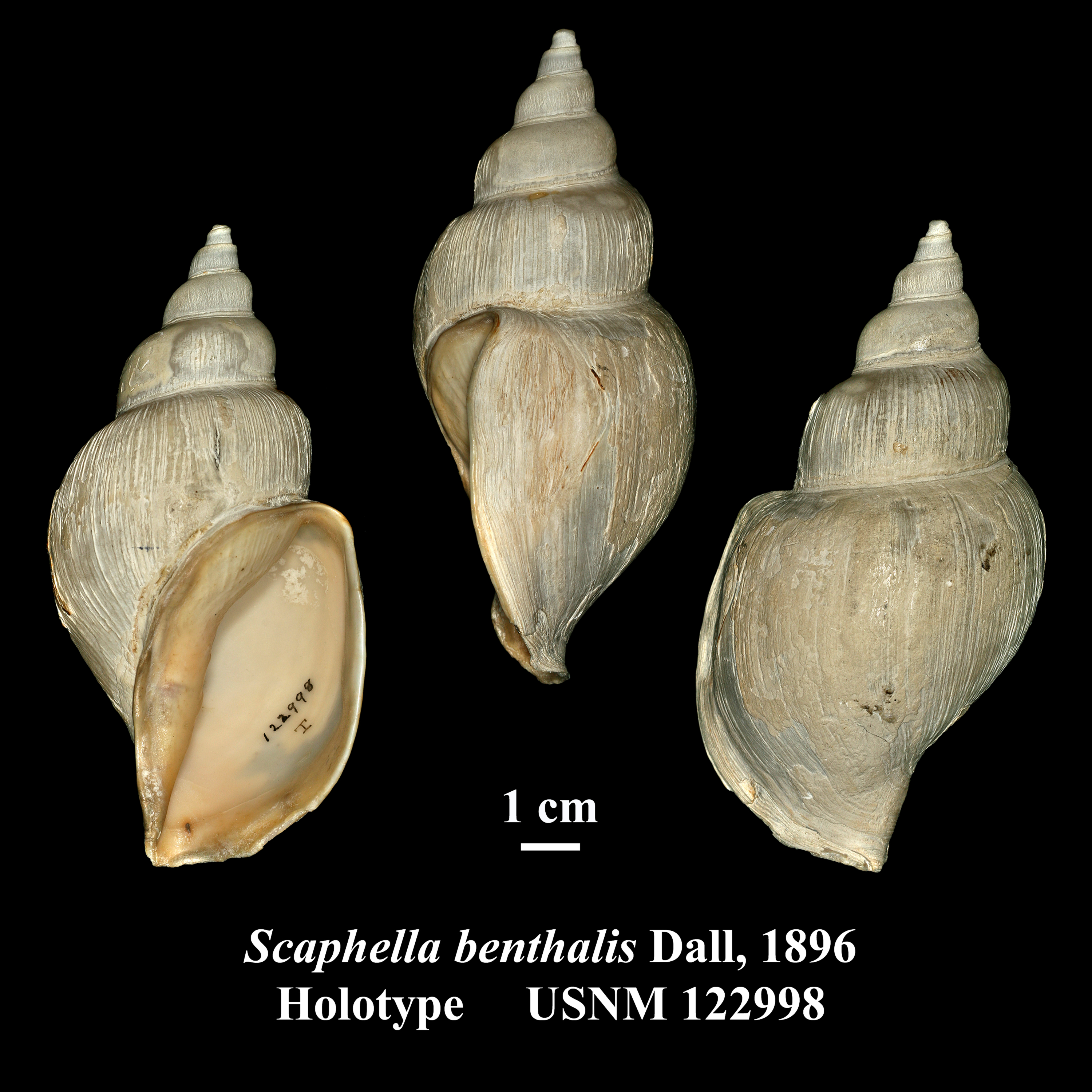
- Shell of Arctomelon benthale

Scientific classification
- Kingdom: Animalia
- Phylum: Mollusca
- Class: Gastropoda
- Subclass: Caenogastropoda
- Order: Neogastropoda
- Family: Volutidae
- Genus: Arctomelon
- Species: A. benthale

Binomial name
- Arctomelon benthale (Dall, 1896)

Synonyms
- Scaphella benthalis Dall, 1896

= Arctomelon benthale =

Species of gastropod

Arctomelon benthale is a species of sea snail, a marine gastropod mollusk in the family Volutidae, the volutes.

== Description ==
The height of the shell attains 125 mm, its diameter 60 mm.

(Original description) The shell recalls Odontocymbiola magellanica (Gmelin, 1791) but is stouter, has more rounded whorls. The aperture is shorter and wider, with a broad flexure where the lip turns to meet the body whorl, while in O. magellanlca the posterior part of the aperture is pointed; the latter has two strong plaits on the columella; Arctomelon benthale has three, all obsolete, the middle one most perceptible, and has a less marked canal and siphonal fasciole.

The interior of the aperture is pale flesh color; the exterior seems to have been like that of Odontocymbiola magellanica, but is almost entirely decorticated. It has five whorls beside the nucleus, and there is no operculum.

== Distribution ==
The holotype of this marine species was found in the Gulf of Panama; occurs also in the Pacific Ocean off Peru.
