= Abyssotrophon multicostatus =

Scientific classification
- Kingdom: Animalia
- Phylum: Mollusca
- Class: Gastropoda
- Subclass: Caenogastropoda
- Order: Neogastropoda
- Family: Muricidae
- Genus: Abyssotrophon
- Species: A. multicostatus

Binomial name
- Abyssotrophon multicostatus Golikov & Sirenko, 1992

Synonyms
- Trophonopsis soyoae multicostatus Golikov & Sirenko, 1992

Species of gastropod

Abyssotrophon multicostatus is a species of sea snail, a marine gastropod mollusc in the family Muricidae, the murex snails or rock snails.
