= Abyssotrophon minimus =

Scientific classification
- Kingdom: Animalia
- Phylum: Mollusca
- Class: Gastropoda
- Subclass: Caenogastropoda
- Order: Neogastropoda
- Family: Muricidae
- Genus: Abyssotrophon
- Species: A. minimus

Binomial name
- Abyssotrophon minimus (Okutani, 1964)

Synonyms
- Trophonopsis soyoae minimus Okutani, 1964

Species of gastropod

Abyssotrophon minimus is a species of sea snail, a marine gastropod mollusc in the family Muricidae, the murex snails or rock snails.
