= Nipponotrophon shingoi =

Scientific classification
- Kingdom: Animalia
- Phylum: Mollusca
- Class: Gastropoda
- Subclass: Caenogastropoda
- Order: Neogastropoda
- Family: Muricidae
- Genus: Nipponotrophon
- Species: N. shingoi

Binomial name
- Nipponotrophon shingoi (Tiba, 1981)

Synonyms
- Trophonopsis shingoi Tiba, 1981

Species of gastropod

Nipponotrophon shingoi is a species of sea snail, a marine gastropod mollusk in the family Muricidae, the murex snails or rock snails.
