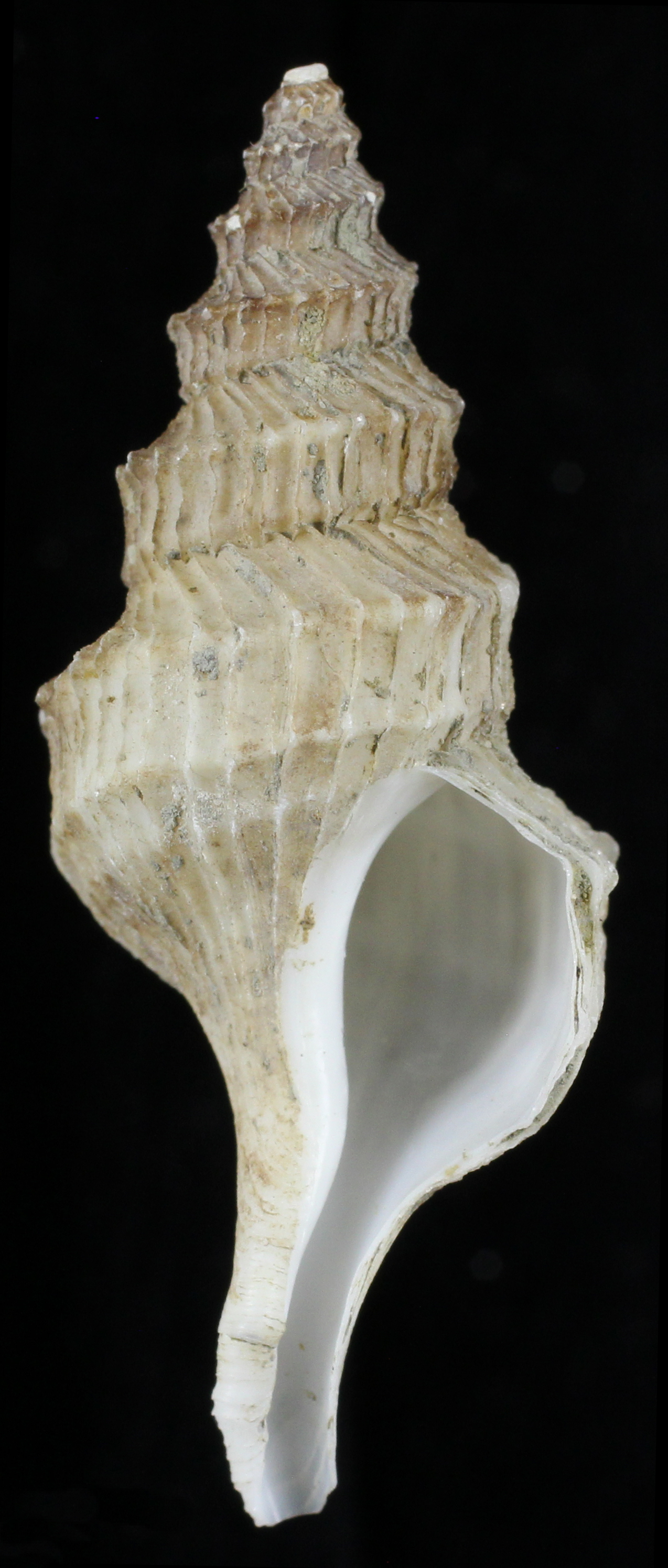
- Shell of Abyssotrophon soyoae (specimen at MNHN, Paris)

Scientific classification
- Kingdom: Animalia
- Phylum: Mollusca
- Class: Gastropoda
- Subclass: Caenogastropoda
- Order: Neogastropoda
- Family: Muricidae
- Genus: Abyssotrophon
- Species: A. soyoae

Binomial name
- Abyssotrophon soyoae (Okutani, 1959)

Synonyms
- Abyssotrophon longisiphon Egorov, 1993; Abyssotrophon tricostatus Egorov, 1993; Trophonopsis soyoae Okutani, 1959

= Abyssotrophon soyoae =

Species of gastropod

Abyssotrophon soyoae is a species of sea snail, a marine gastropod mollusc in the family Muricidae, the murex snails or rock snails.

== Distribution ==
This marine species occurs in the Okinawa Trough. and also off southeast Taiwan.

== Ecology ==
It was recorded 1973 m deep.
