= Nodulotrophon raymondi =

Scientific classification
- Kingdom: Animalia
- Phylum: Mollusca
- Class: Gastropoda
- Subclass: Caenogastropoda
- Order: Neogastropoda
- Family: Muricidae
- Genus: Nodulotrophon
- Species: N. raymondi

Binomial name
- Nodulotrophon raymondi (Moody, 1916)

Synonyms
- Trophon raymondi Moody, 1916

Species of gastropod

Nodulotrophon raymondi is a species of sea snail, a marine gastropod mollusk in the family Muricidae, the murex snails or rock snails.
