= Nodulotrophon =

Scientific classification
- Kingdom: Animalia
- Phylum: Mollusca
- Class: Gastropoda
- Subclass: Caenogastropoda
- Order: Neogastropoda
- Family: Muricidae
- Subfamily: Trophoninae
- Genus: Nodulotrophon; Habe & Ito, 1965

Genus of gastropods

Nodulotrophon is a genus of sea snails, marine gastropod mollusks in the family Muricidae, the murex snails or rock snails.

== Species ==
Species within the genus Nodulotrophon include:

- Nodulotrophon coronatus (H. Adams & A. Adams, 1864)
- Nodulotrophon raymondi (Moody, 1916)
- Nodulotrophon scolopax (Watson, 1882)
- Nodulotrophon septus (Watson, 1882)
