= Abyssotrophon crystallinus =

Scientific classification
- Kingdom: Animalia
- Phylum: Mollusca
- Class: Gastropoda
- Subclass: Caenogastropoda
- Order: Neogastropoda
- Family: Muricidae
- Genus: Abyssotrophon
- Species: A. crystallinus

Binomial name
- Abyssotrophon crystallinus (Kuroda, 1953)

Synonyms
- Trophonopsis crystallinus Kuroda, 1953

Species of gastropod

Abyssotrophon crystallinus is a species of sea snail, a marine gastropod mollusc in the family Muricidae, the murex snails or rock snails.

== Distribution ==
Found off the Pacific coast of Honshu, Japan, at a depth of 530 meters.
