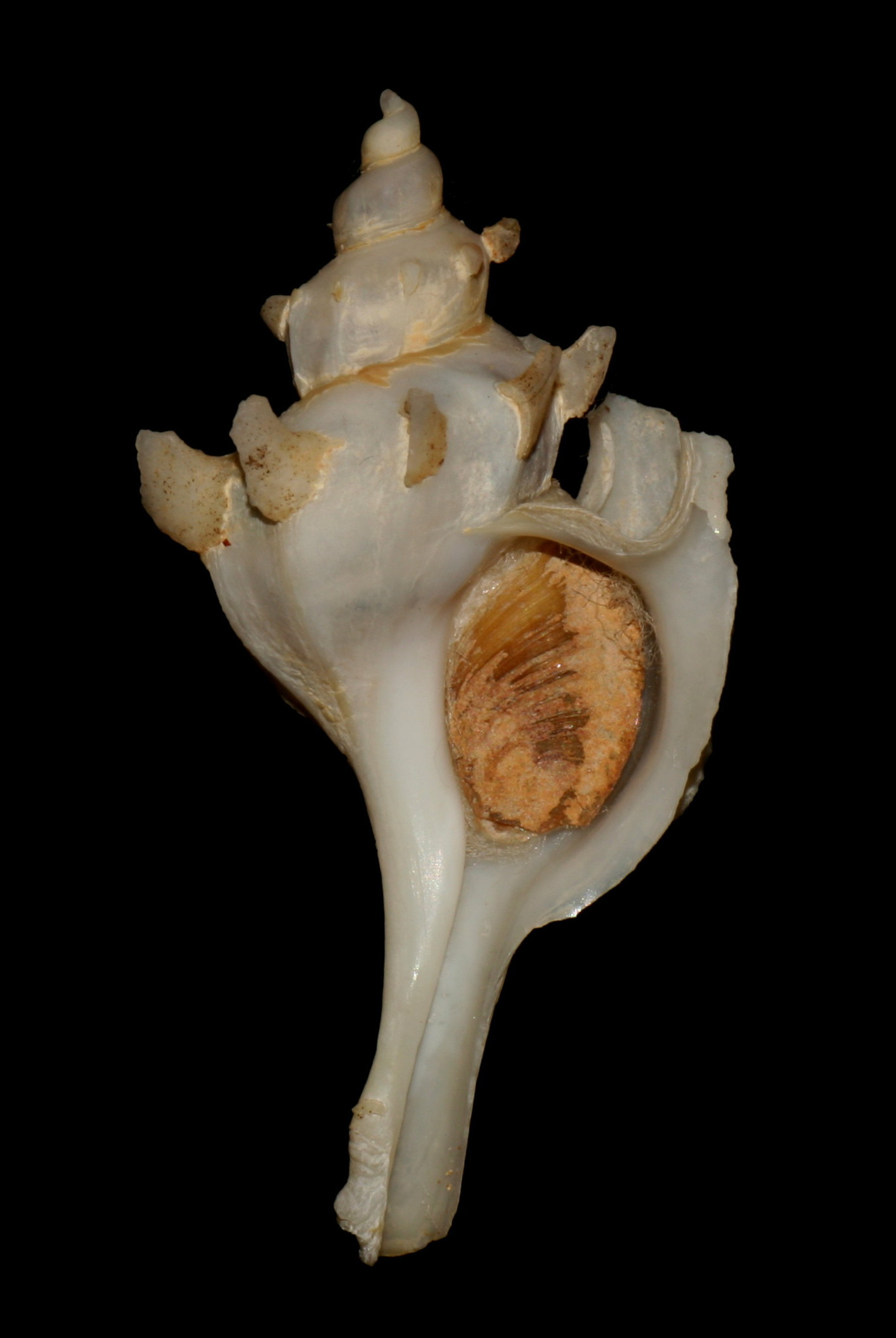
- Gastropod shell of Boreotrophon alaskanus with operculum, 40.5 mm in length, trawled in 200 fathoms off the Cape of Erimo, Hokkaido Island, Japan.

Scientific classification
- Kingdom: Animalia
- Phylum: Mollusca
- Class: Gastropoda
- Subclass: Caenogastropoda
- Order: Neogastropoda
- Family: Muricidae
- Genus: Boreotrophon
- Species: B. alaskanus

Binomial name
- Boreotrophon alaskanus (Dall, 1902)

Synonyms
- Trophon alaskanus Dall, 1902; Boreotrophon alborostratus Taki, 1938; Neptunea ithitoma Dall, 1919

= Boreotrophon alaskanus =

Species of gastropod

Boreotrophon alaskanus is a species of sea snail, a marine gastropod mollusk in the family Muricidae, the murex snails or rock snails.

== Description ==
The shell is bone to creamy white in color with an elevated spire, a very distinct suture, and a strongly curved, long, slender siphonal canal. The shell has two nuclear whorls (which are typically eroded) and five subsequent whorls. The whorls are rounded and bear 8 to 10 narrow varices which are prominent at the shoulder, where they rise into long blunt spines that curve towards the axis of the shell. The aperture is subovate, and the operculum is thin and light brown. Length 14 to 45 mm.

== Distribution ==
This snail occurs in the Bering Sea north of Unalaska to northern Honshu, Japan.
