= Arctomelon tamikoae =

Scientific classification
- Kingdom: Animalia
- Phylum: Mollusca
- Class: Gastropoda
- Subclass: Caenogastropoda
- Order: Neogastropoda
- Family: Volutidae
- Genus: Arctomelon
- Species: A. tamikoae

Binomial name
- Arctomelon tamikoae (Kosuge, 1970)

Synonyms
- Boreomelon tamikoae Kosuge, 1970

Species of gastropod

Arctomelon tamikoae is a species of sea snail, a marine gastropod mollusk in the family Volutidae, the volutes.

== Description ==
The length of the shell varies between 200 mm and 208 mm.

== Distribution ==
This species occurs off the Aleutian Islands in Alaska, United States.
