= Abyssotrophon ruthenicus =

Scientific classification
- Kingdom: Animalia
- Phylum: Mollusca
- Class: Gastropoda
- Subclass: Caenogastropoda
- Order: Neogastropoda
- Family: Muricidae
- Genus: Abyssotrophon
- Species: A. ruthenicus

Binomial name
- Abyssotrophon ruthenicus Egorov, 1993

Species of gastropod

Abyssotrophon ruthenicus is a species of sea snail, a marine gastropod mollusc in the family Muricidae, the murex snails or rock snails.
