= Boreotrophon apolyonis =

Scientific classification
- Kingdom: Animalia
- Phylum: Mollusca
- Class: Gastropoda
- Subclass: Caenogastropoda
- Order: Neogastropoda
- Family: Muricidae
- Genus: Boreotrophon
- Species: B. apolyonis

Binomial name
- Boreotrophon apolyonis (Dall, 1919)

Synonyms
- Neptunea apolyonis Dall, 1919

Species of gastropod

Boreotrophon apolyonis is a species of sea snail, a marine gastropod mollusk in the family Muricidae, the murex snails or rock snails.

== Description ==
White shell cover in enamel with more than four whorls, an eroded apex and a low, sharp axial sculpture. There is no spiral sculpture and the aperture is wide. The last whorl has a blunted angle. The height of the shell is 21 millimeters with a diameter of 10 millimeters.
