= Nodulotrophon septus =

Scientific classification
- Kingdom: Animalia
- Phylum: Mollusca
- Class: Gastropoda
- Subclass: Caenogastropoda
- Order: Neogastropoda
- Family: Muricidae
- Genus: Nodulotrophon
- Species: N. septus

Binomial name
- Nodulotrophon septus (Watson, 1882)

Synonyms
- Trophon septus Watson, 1882

Species of gastropod

Nodulotrophon septus is a species of sea snail, a marine gastropod mollusk in the family Muricidae, the murex snails or rock snails.
