= Arctomelon boreale =

Scientific classification
- Kingdom: Animalia
- Phylum: Mollusca
- Class: Gastropoda
- Subclass: Caenogastropoda
- Order: Neogastropoda
- Family: Volutidae
- Genus: Arctomelon
- Species: A. boreale

Binomial name
- Arctomelon boreale R. N. Clark, 2018

Species of gastropod

Arctomelon boreale is a species of sea snail, a marine gastropod mollusk in the family Volutidae, the volutes.

== Description ==
The length of the shell varies between 90 mm and 126 mm.

== Distribution ==
This deep-water species occurs off the Aleutian Islands, Alaska, United States.
