= Nipponotrophon echinus =

Scientific classification
- Kingdom: Animalia
- Phylum: Mollusca
- Class: Gastropoda
- Subclass: Caenogastropoda
- Order: Neogastropoda
- Family: Muricidae
- Genus: Nipponotrophon
- Species: N. echinus

Binomial name
- Nipponotrophon echinus (Dall, 1918)

Synonyms
- Boreotrophon echinus Dall, 1918

Species of gastropod

Nipponotrophon echinus is a species of sea snail, a marine gastropod mollusk in the family Muricidae, the murex snails or rock snails.
