= Trophon drygalskii =

Scientific classification
- Kingdom: Animalia
- Phylum: Mollusca
- Class: Gastropoda
- Subclass: Caenogastropoda
- Order: Neogastropoda
- Family: Muricidae
- Genus: Trophon
- Species: T. drygalskii

Binomial name
- Trophon drygalskii (Thiele, 1912)

Synonyms
- Abyssotrophon drygalskii (Thiele, 1912)

Species of gastropod

Trophon drygalskii is a species of sea snail, a marine gastropod mollusk, in the family Muricidae, the murex snails or rock snails.
