= Nodulotrophon coronatus =

Scientific classification
- Kingdom: Animalia
- Phylum: Mollusca
- Class: Gastropoda
- Subclass: Caenogastropoda
- Order: Neogastropoda
- Family: Muricidae
- Genus: Nodulotrophon
- Species: N. coronatus

Binomial name
- Nodulotrophon coronatus (H. Adams & A. Adams, 1864)

Synonyms
- Boreotrophon dalli (Kobelt, 1878); Boreotrophon dalli var. altus Dall, 1902; Trophon coronatus (H. Adams & A. Adams, 1864); Trophon dalli Kobelt, 1878; Trophon muriciformis Dall, 1886

Species of gastropod

Nodulotrophon coronatus is a species of sea snail, a marine gastropod mollusk in the family Muricidae, the murex snails or rock snails.
