= Nipponotrophon gorgon =

Scientific classification
- Kingdom: Animalia
- Phylum: Mollusca
- Class: Gastropoda
- Subclass: Caenogastropoda
- Order: Neogastropoda
- Family: Muricidae
- Genus: Nipponotrophon
- Species: N. gorgon

Binomial name
- Nipponotrophon gorgon (Dall, 1913)

Synonyms
- Boreotrophon gorgon Dall, 1913

Species of gastropod

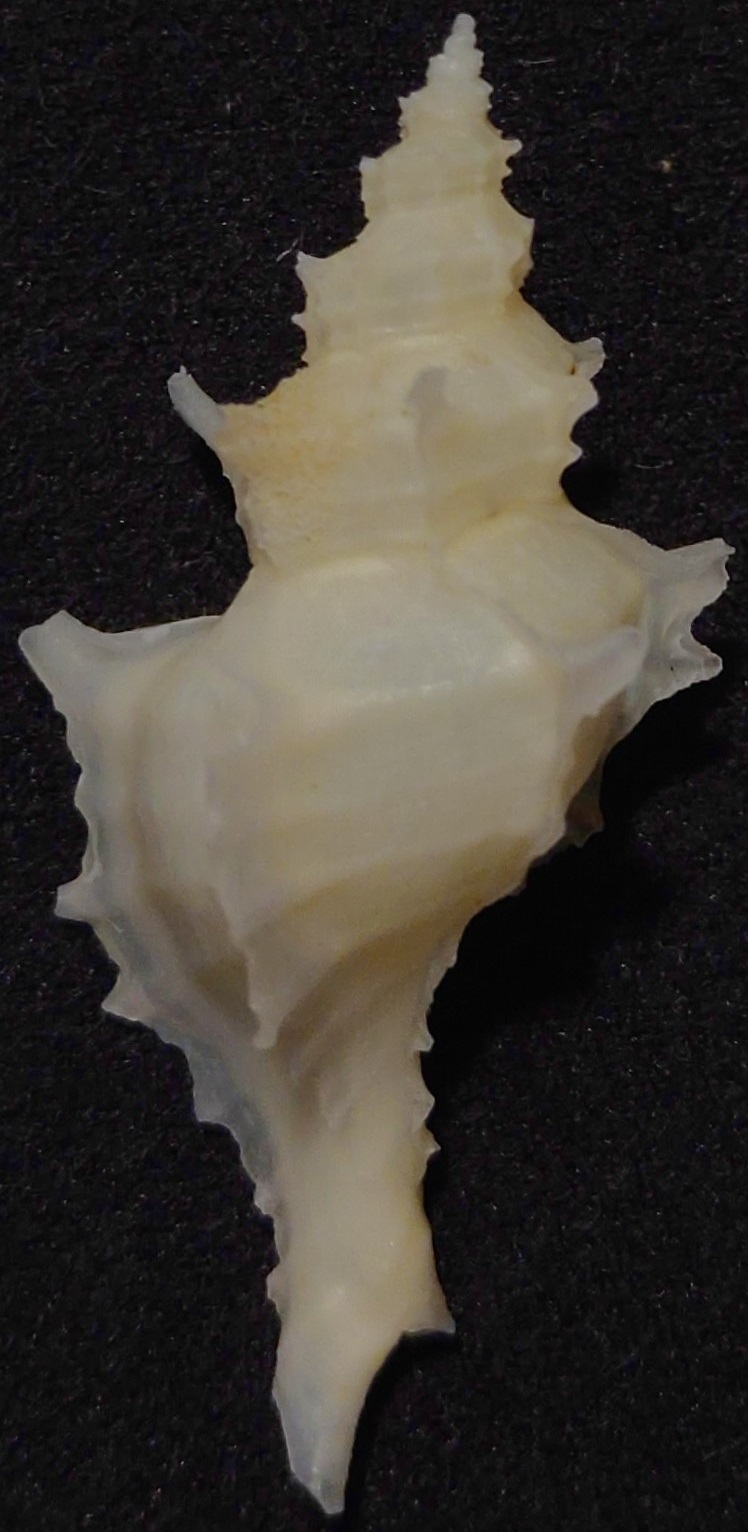

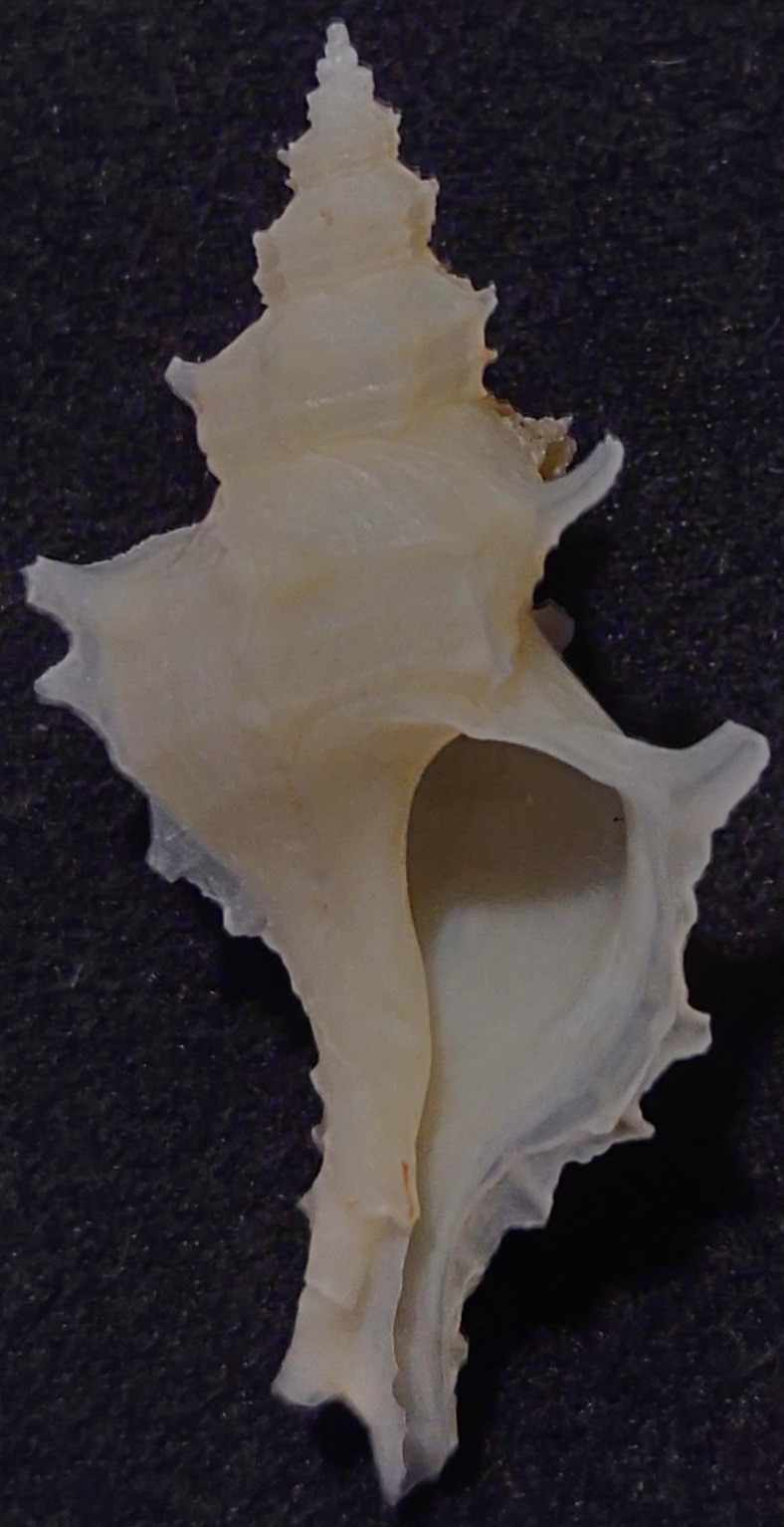

Nipponotrophon gorgon is a species of sea snail, a marine gastropod mollusk in the family Muricidae, the murex snails or rock snails.
