= Scabrotrophon fabricii =

Scientific classification
- Kingdom: Animalia
- Phylum: Mollusca
- Class: Gastropoda
- Subclass: Caenogastropoda
- Order: Neogastropoda
- Family: Muricidae
- Genus: Scabrotrophon
- Species: S. fabricii

Binomial name
- Scabrotrophon fabricii (Møller, 1842)

Synonyms
- Boreotrophon craticulatus (O. Fabricus, 1780); Murex borealis Reeve, 1845; Tritonium craticulatum Fabricius, 1780; Trophon craticulatum Fabricius, 1780; Trophon fabricii Beck in Møller, 1842; Trophon heuglini Mörch, 1876; Trophon interstriatus Sowerby, 1880; Trophonopsis fabricii Beck in Møller, 1842

Species of gastropod

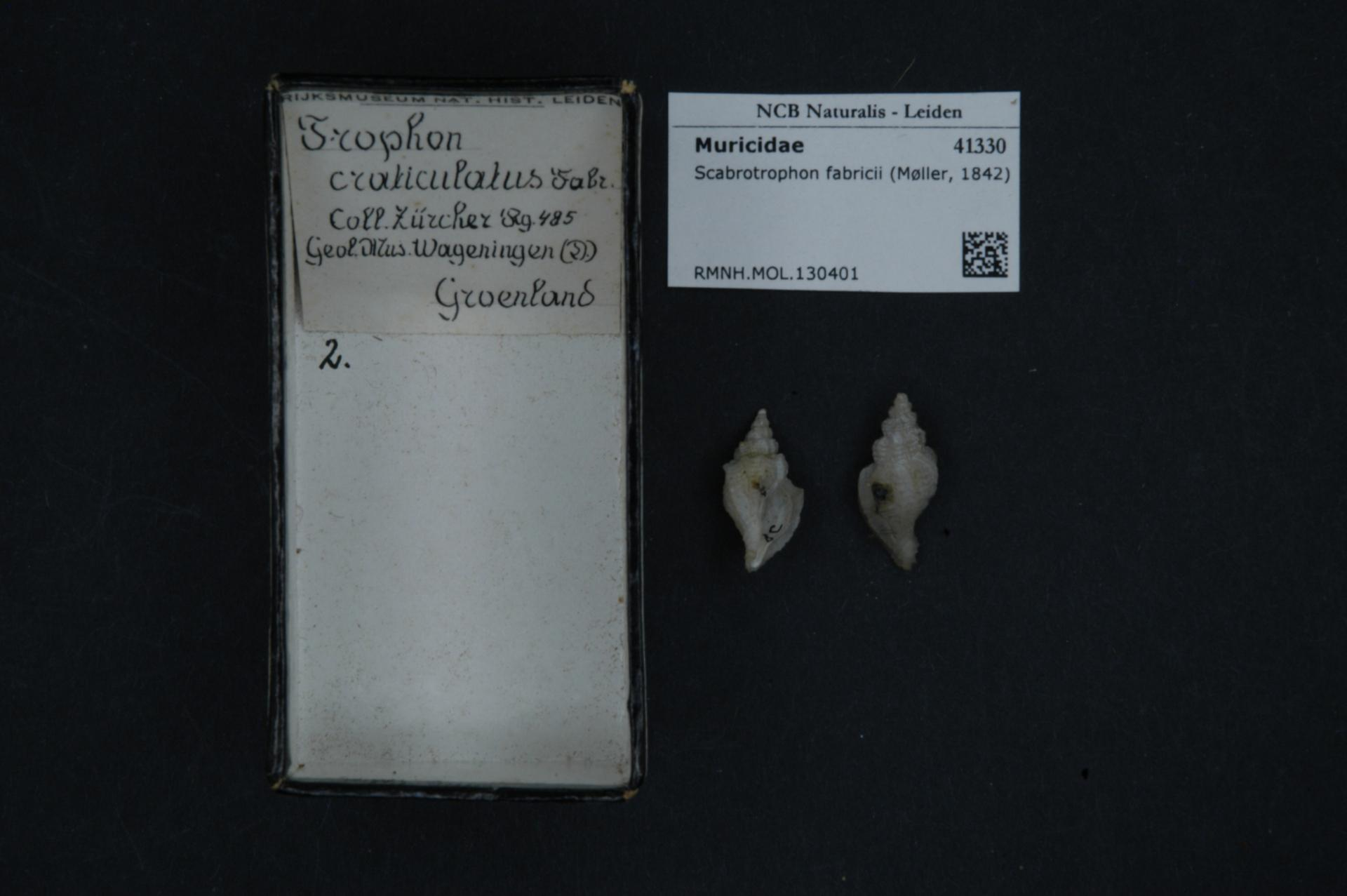

Scabrotrophon fabricii is a species of sea snail, a marine gastropod mollusk in the family Muricidae, the murex snails or rock snails. They are carnivorous.

== Description ==
The color of an adult's shell can be white, tan, or brown, and its size varies between 22 mm and 61 mm. The species' chirality is dextral.

== Distribution ==
This species is distributed in European waters, the Northwest Atlantic Ocean and in the Gulf of St. Lawrence (Canada). The species also occurs in west and east Greenland at 76°N to 45°N, 94°W to 0°W.
