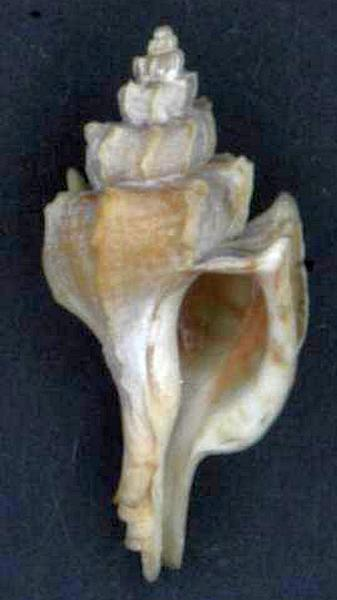

Scientific classification
- Kingdom: Animalia
- Phylum: Mollusca
- Class: Gastropoda
- Subclass: Caenogastropoda
- Order: Neogastropoda
- Family: Muricidae
- Genus: Boreotrophon
- Species: B. candelabrum

Binomial name
- Boreotrophon candelabrum (Reeve, 1848)

Synonyms
- Arctomelon paucicostatus [sic]; Boreotrophon paucicostatus Habe & Ito, 1965; Boreotrophon stephanos Taki, 1938; Fusus candelabrum Reeve, 1848

= Boreotrophon candelabrum =

Species of gastropod

Boreotrophon candelabrum is a species of sea snail, a marine gastropod mollusk in the family Muricidae, the murex snails or rock snails.

== Behavior ==
B. candelabrum have been known to attack and eat sea scallops by drilling into them.
