= Arctomelon ryosukei =

Scientific classification
- Kingdom: Animalia
- Phylum: Mollusca
- Class: Gastropoda
- Subclass: Caenogastropoda
- Order: Neogastropoda
- Family: Volutidae
- Genus: Arctomelon
- Species: A. ryosukei

Binomial name
- Arctomelon ryosukei (T. Habe & Ki. Ito, 1965)

Synonyms
- Arctomelon stearnsii ryosukei (T. Habe & Ki. Ito, 1965) superseded rank; Boreomelon stearnsii ryosukei T. Habe & Ki. Ito, 1965 superseded combination

Species of gastropod

Arctomelon ryosukei is a species of sea snail, a marine gastropod mollusk in the family Volutidae, the volutes.

== Description ==
The length of the shell attains 136 mm.

== Distribution ==
This species occurs in the Bering Sea.
