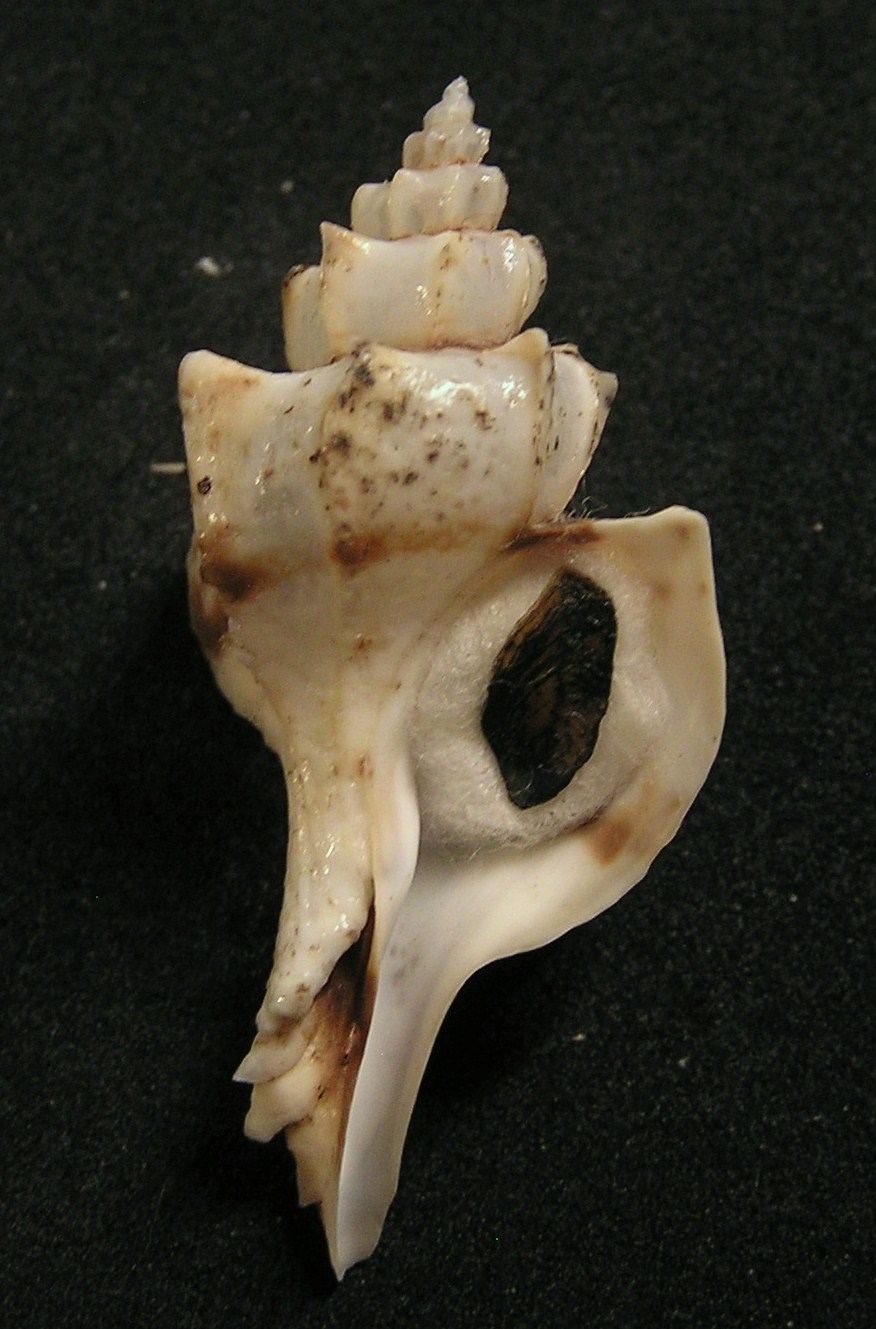
- Apertural view of a shell of Boreotrophon clathratus gunneri

Scientific classification
- Kingdom: Animalia
- Phylum: Mollusca
- Class: Gastropoda
- Subclass: Caenogastropoda
- Order: Neogastropoda
- Family: Muricidae
- Genus: Boreotrophon
- Species: B. clathratus

Binomial name
- Boreotrophon clathratus (Linnaeus, 1767)

Synonyms
- Buccinum lamellatum Gmelin, 1791; Buccinum lyratum Gmelin, 1791; Fusus costatus Hisinger; Fusus imbricatus Jas. Smith; Fusus scalariformis Gould, 1840; Murex clathratus Linnaeus, 1767; Tritonium clathratum (Linnaeus, 1767); Tritonium clathratus var. normalis Middendorff, 1849; Tritonium clathratus var. ventricosa Middendorff, 1849; Tritonium eliator Middendorff, 1849; Tritonium gunneri Lovén, 1846; Tritonium rossi Leach in Mörch, 1858; Trophon candelabrum Adams & Reeve; Trophon clathratus (Linnaeus, 1767); Trophon clathratus var. grandis Mörch, 1869; Trophon clathratus var. intermedius Verkrüzen, 1881; Trophon clathratus var. maximus Verkrüzen, 1881; Trophon gunneri Lovén, 1846; Trophon kroyeri Beck; Trophon richardsoni Gray in Mörch, 1869; Trophonopsis clathratus (Linnaeus)

= Boreotrophon clathratus =

Species of gastropod

Boreotrophon clathratus, common name the clathrate trophon, is a species of sea snail, a marine gastropod mollusk in the family Muricidae, the murex snails or rock snails.

== Description ==
The height of the shell is in excess of 1.5 cm (0.6 in). The fusiform shell has fourteen ribs or more. The whorls have numerous sharp, laminated varices. The canal is open and turned to the left. There is no umbilicus. The thin lip is smooth within.

== Distribution ==
This species has a wide, usually boreal distribution. It occurs in European waters, the Baltic Sea, the Beaufort Sea, in the Northwest Atlantic Ocean, in the Bering Strait, in the Yellow Sea, in the Pacific Ocean.
