= Nipponotrophon pagodus =

Scientific classification
- Kingdom: Animalia
- Phylum: Mollusca
- Class: Gastropoda
- Subclass: Caenogastropoda
- Order: Neogastropoda
- Family: Muricidae
- Genus: Nipponotrophon
- Species: N. pagodus

Binomial name
- Nipponotrophon pagodus (Hayashi & Habe, 1965)

Synonyms
- Boreotrophon pagodus Hayashi & Habe, 1965

Species of gastropod

Nipponotrophon pagodus is a species of sea snail, a marine gastropod mollusk in the family Muricidae, the murex snails or rock snails.
