= Warenia =

Scientific classification
- Kingdom: Animalia
- Phylum: Mollusca
- Class: Gastropoda
- Subclass: Caenogastropoda
- Order: Neogastropoda
- Family: Muricidae
- Genus: Warenia; Houart, Vermeij & Wiedrick, 2019
- Species: W. elegantula

Binomial name
- Warenia elegantula (Dall, 1907)

Synonyms
- Boreotrophon elegantulus Dall, 1907 (original combination); Neptunea elegantulus Dall, 1907

Genus of gastropods

Warenia is a genus of sea snails in the family Muricidae, the murex snails or rock snails. There is one species in the genus: Warenia elegantula. This marine species occurs of the Aleutian Islands.
