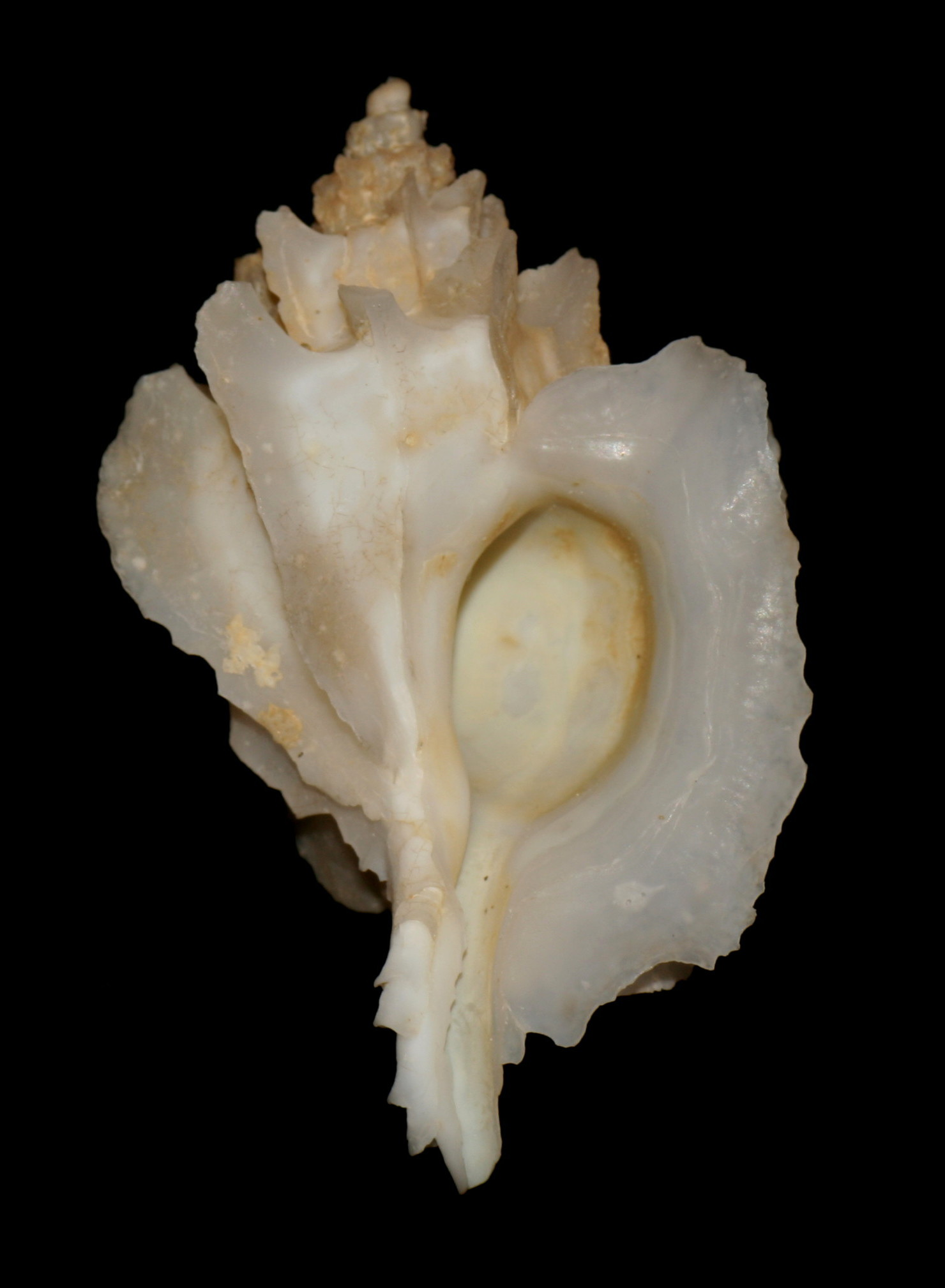
- Apertural view; shell 53.4 mm long

Scientific classification
- Kingdom: Animalia
- Phylum: Mollusca
- Class: Gastropoda
- Subclass: Caenogastropoda
- Order: Neogastropoda
- Family: Muricidae
- Genus: Scabrotrophon
- Species: S. stuarti

Binomial name
- Scabrotrophon stuarti (E. A. Smith, 1880)

Synonyms
- Boreotrophon smithi Dall, 1902; Boreotrophon stuarti (E.A. Smith, 1880); Nipponotrophon stuarti (E. A. Smith, 1880); Trophon stuarti E. A. Smith, 1880; Trophon (Boreotrophon) stuarti E. A. Smith, 1880; Trophonopsis stuarti (E. A. Smith, 1880)

= Scabrotrophon stuarti =

Species of gastropod

Scabrotrophon stuarti is a species of sea snail, a marine gastropod mollusk in the family Muricidae, the murex snails or rock snails.

== Description ==
The shell is bone white to yellow cream in color with an elevated spire, a waxy appearance and texture, a very distinct suture, and a weakly curved, fairly short, slender siphonal canal. The shell has two nuclear whorls (which are typically eroded) and five to six subsequent whorls. The whorls bear 10 wide blade like varices which are prominent at the shoulder, where they rise into blunt rounded tips that curve backwards from the aperture of the shell. The surface texture of the shell appears smooth and waxy, however under magnification microsculpture is visible consisting of minute striations both spirally and longitudinally. The aperture is an elongated oval in shape. Length 50 to 60 mm.

Original Description by E. A. Smith:
"Testa breviter fusiformis, alba. Anfractus 7, superne planati et angulati lateribis planis costis late lamelliformbus, aliquanto obliquis, erectis, superne ad angulum valde sursum productis dextrosumque curvatis, costis transversis (in anfr. superioribus 2-3, in ultimo 4) aequidistantibus, et sipra longitudinalibus continuis instructi. Apertura irregulariter ovata, inferne in canalem producta. Canalis curvatus, retrorsus, aperturam fere aequans. Columella leviter arcuata, callo tenui extus libera induta. Labrum expansum, costa ultima lamelliformi extus munitum. Long., 53; diam., 21; long. apert., 31; lat. intus, 10 mm."

== Distribution ==
This species is found in Alaska at extreme low tide and ranges south in deeper water along the West Coast all the way to San Diego in California.
