= L. richeri =

L. richeri may refer to:

- Leptotrophon richeri, a species of sea snail in the family Muricidae
- Lithodes richeri, a species of king crab
