= Leptotrophon segmentatus =

Scientific classification
- Kingdom: Animalia
- Phylum: Mollusca
- Class: Gastropoda
- Subclass: Caenogastropoda
- Order: Neogastropoda
- Family: Muricidae
- Subfamily: Trophoninae
- Genus: Leptotrophon
- Species: L. segmentatus

Binomial name
- Leptotrophon segmentatus (Verco, 1909)

Synonyms
- Gemixystus segmentatus (Verco, 1909) superseded combination; Trophon segmentatus Verco, 1909; Trophonopsis segmentata (Verco, 1909)

Species of gastropod

Leptotrophon segmentatus is a species of sea snail, a marine gastropod mollusk in the family Muricidae, the murex snails or rock snails.

== Description ==
The length of the shell attains 9 mm.

== Distribution ==
This marine species occurs off Southern Australia and Tasmania.
