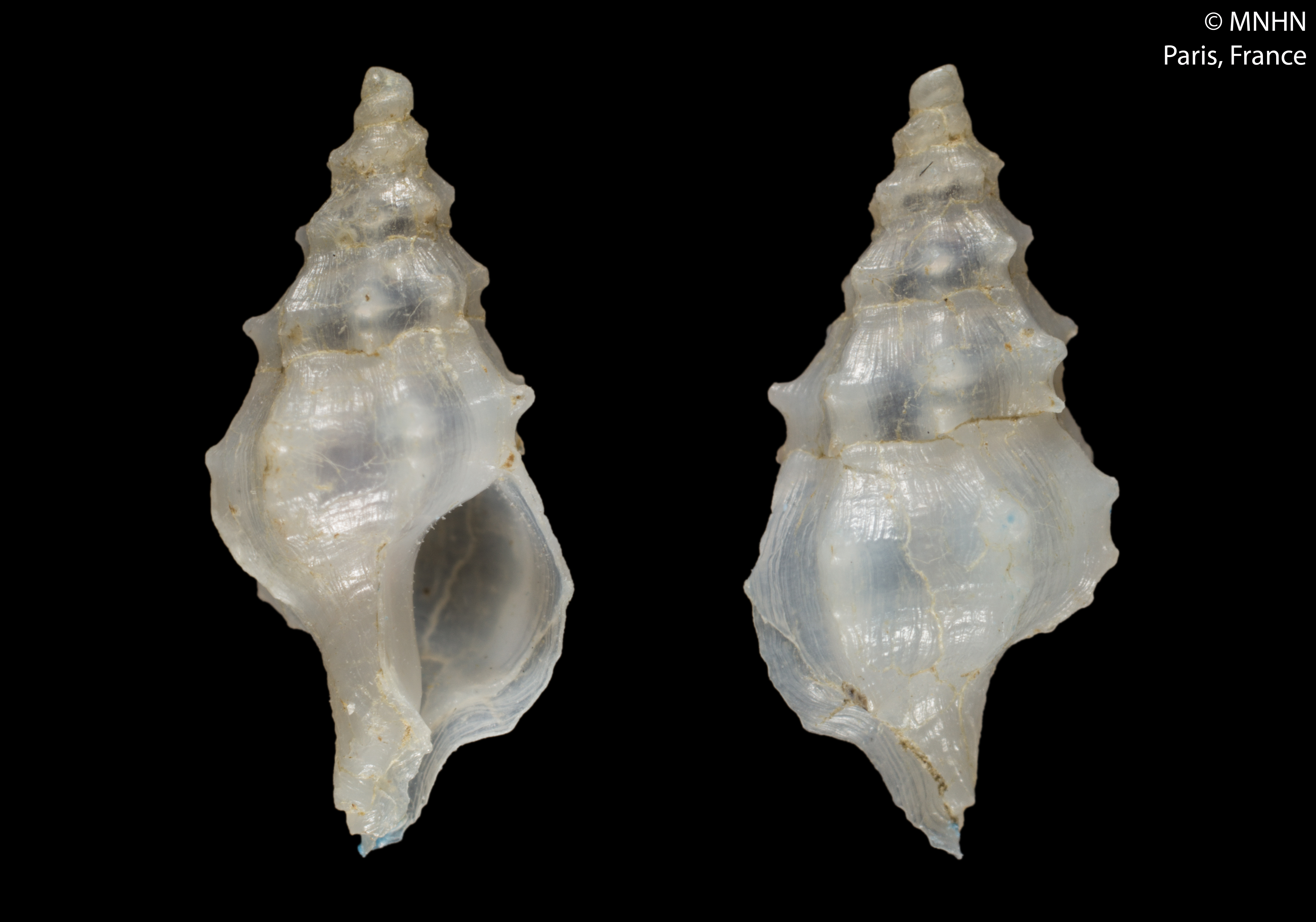

Scientific classification
- Kingdom: Animalia
- Phylum: Mollusca
- Class: Gastropoda
- Subclass: Caenogastropoda
- Order: Neogastropoda
- Family: Muricidae
- Genus: Leptotrophon
- Species: L. protocarinatus

Binomial name
- Leptotrophon protocarinatus Houart, 1995

= Leptotrophon protocarinatus =

Species of gastropod

Leptotrophon protocarinatus is a species of sea snail, a marine gastropod mollusk in the family Muricidae, the murex snails or rock snails.

== Description ==
The length of the shell reaches up to 11 mm in adulthood. It is remarkable for its keeled protoconch, from which it gets its name. It is generally white, occasionally found with pale brown spots near the vertex of the shell. It has medium-sized radular teeth, with sickle-shaped lateral teeth.

== Distribution ==
This marine species occurs at New Caledonia at depths between 300 m and 350 m.
