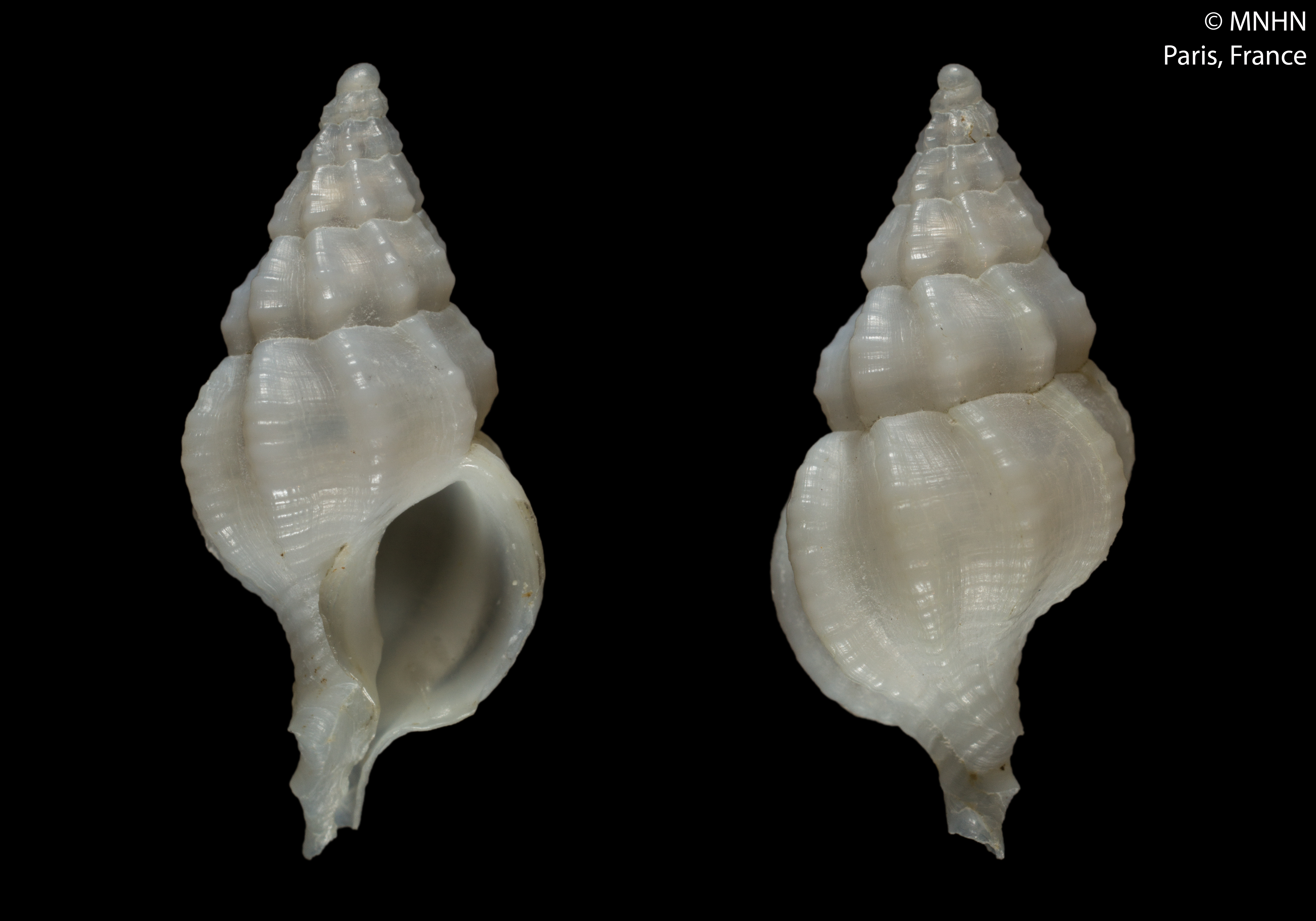
- Shell of Leptotrophon fusiformis (holotype at MNHN, Paris)

Scientific classification
- Kingdom: Animalia
- Phylum: Mollusca
- Class: Gastropoda
- Subclass: Caenogastropoda
- Order: Neogastropoda
- Superfamily: Muricoidea
- Family: Muricidae
- Subfamily: Trophoninae
- Genus: Leptotrophon
- Species: L. fusiformis

Binomial name
- Leptotrophon fusiformis Houart, 2017

= Leptotrophon fusiformis =

Species of gastropod

Leptotrophon fusiformis is a species of sea snail, a marine gastropod mollusk, in the family Muricidae, the murex snails or rock snails.

== Description ==
The length of the shell attains 16.2 mm.

Its functional group is Benthos.

Its feeding type is predatory.

== Distribution ==
This species occurs in Papua New Guinea. in the Solomon Sea.
