= Leptotrophon coriolis =

Scientific classification
- Kingdom: Animalia
- Phylum: Mollusca
- Class: Gastropoda
- Subclass: Caenogastropoda
- Order: Neogastropoda
- Family: Muricidae
- Genus: Leptotrophon
- Species: L. coriolis

Binomial name
- Leptotrophon coriolis Houart, 1995

Species of gastropod

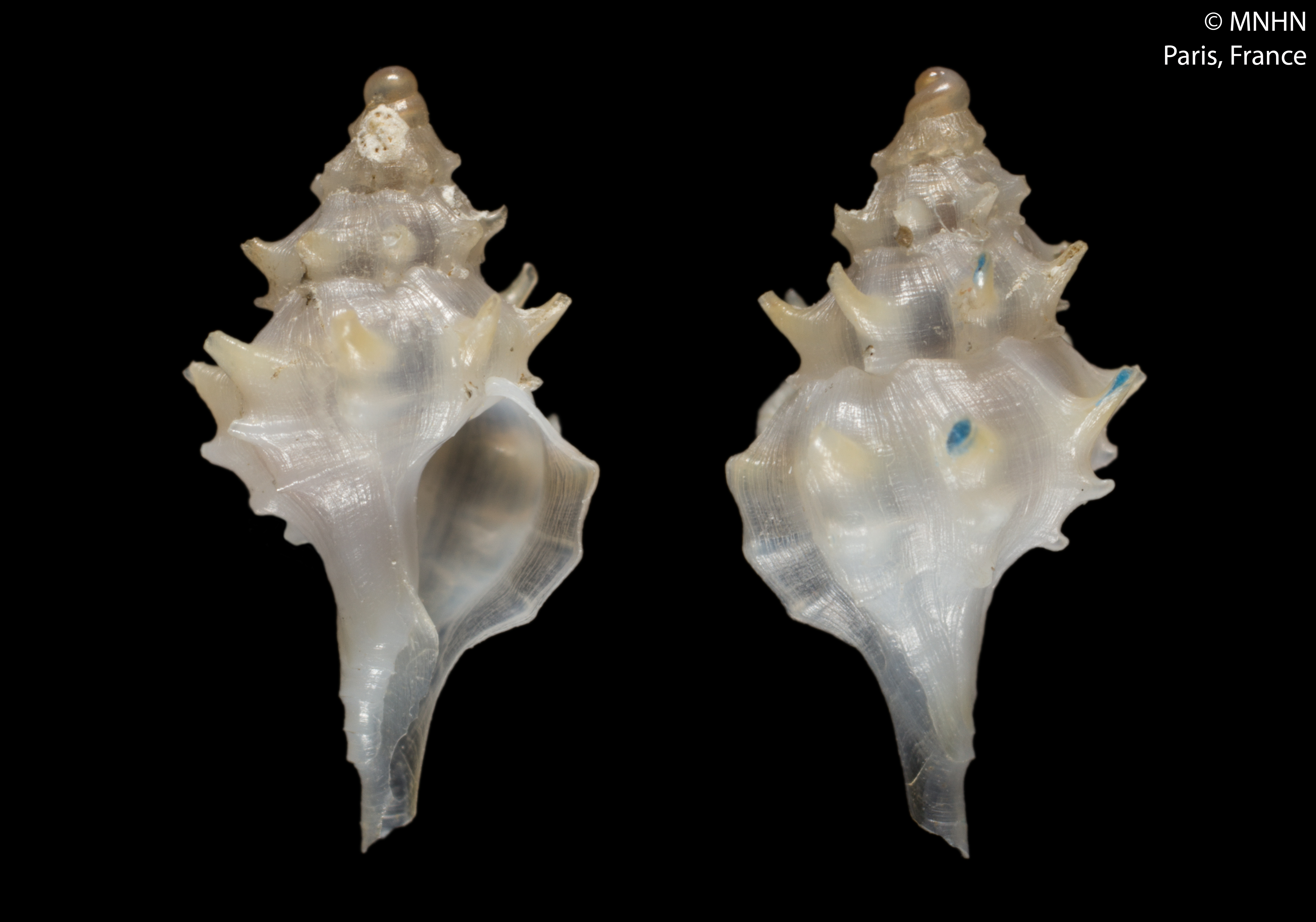
Leptotrophon coriolis

Leptotrophon coriolis is a species of sea snail, a marine gastropod mollusk in the family Muricidae, the murex snails or rock snails.

== Description ==
The length of the shell attains 7.7 mm.

== Distribution ==
This species occurs in the Coral Sea at depths between 305 m. and 410 m.
