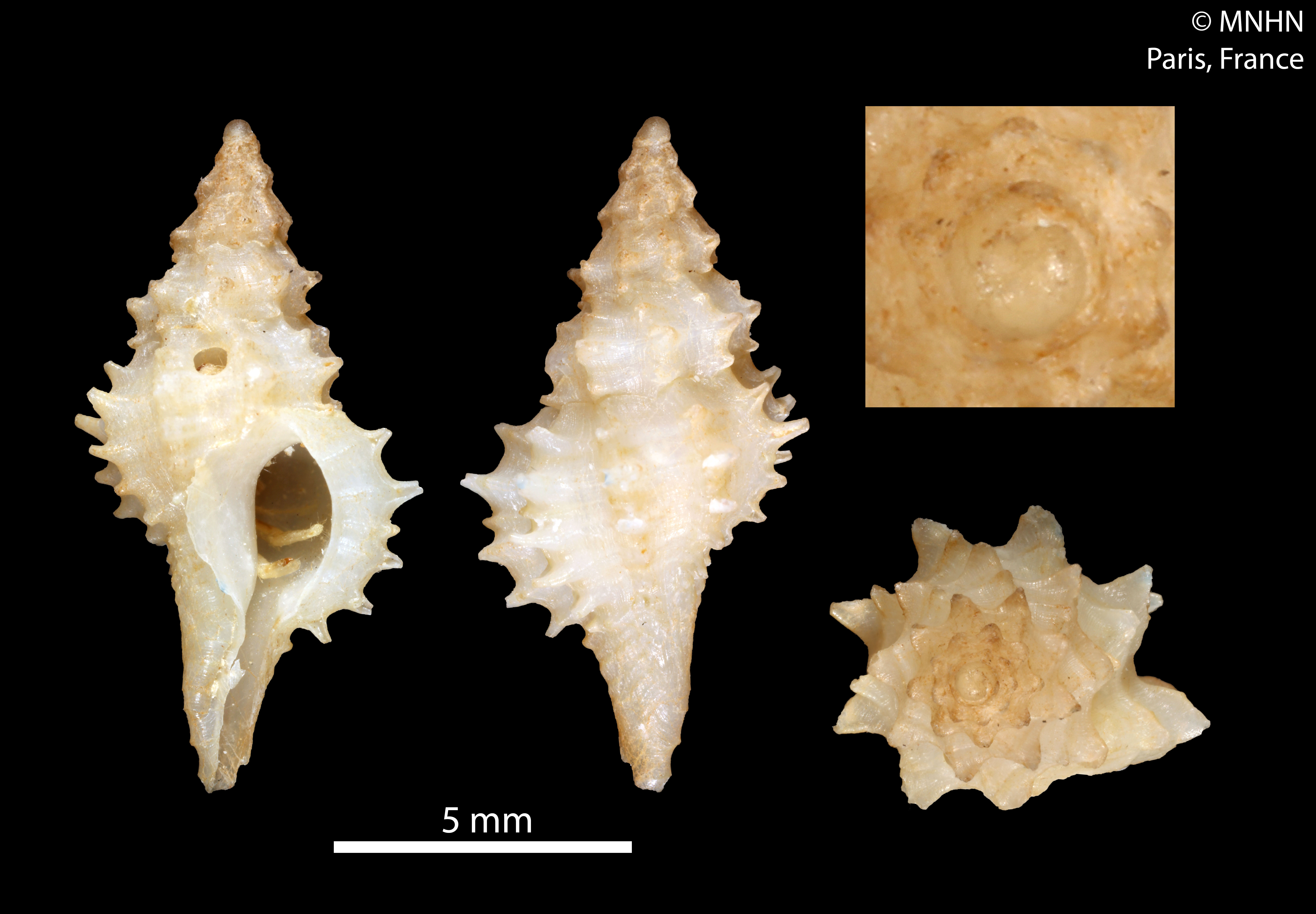
- Shell of Leptotrophon spinacutus (specimen at MNHN, Paris)

Scientific classification
- Kingdom: Animalia
- Phylum: Mollusca
- Class: Gastropoda
- Subclass: Caenogastropoda
- Order: Neogastropoda
- Family: Muricidae
- Genus: Leptotrophon
- Species: L. spinacutus

Binomial name
- Leptotrophon spinacutus (Houart, 1986)

Synonyms
- Poirieria (Paziella) spinacutus Houart, 1986

= Leptotrophon spinacutus =

Species of gastropod

Leptotrophon spinacutus, also known as Poirieria spinacatus, is a species of sea snail, a marine gastropod mollusk in the family Muricidae, the murex snails or rock snails.

== Description ==
The length of the shell attains 9.5 mm.

Leptotrophon spinacutus was first described as such in a journal of the French National Museum of Natural History (1986) along with six other new species of Muricidae, by the Belgian malacologist Roland Houart.

== Distribution ==
This particular species was found south of the French territory of New Caledonia, 390-400m below sea-level. Houart describes it as having a medium-sized shell for its genus, and being white in color with pale brown blotches. It is covered by a thin white outer layer, the intritacalx (= the chalky outer layer).
