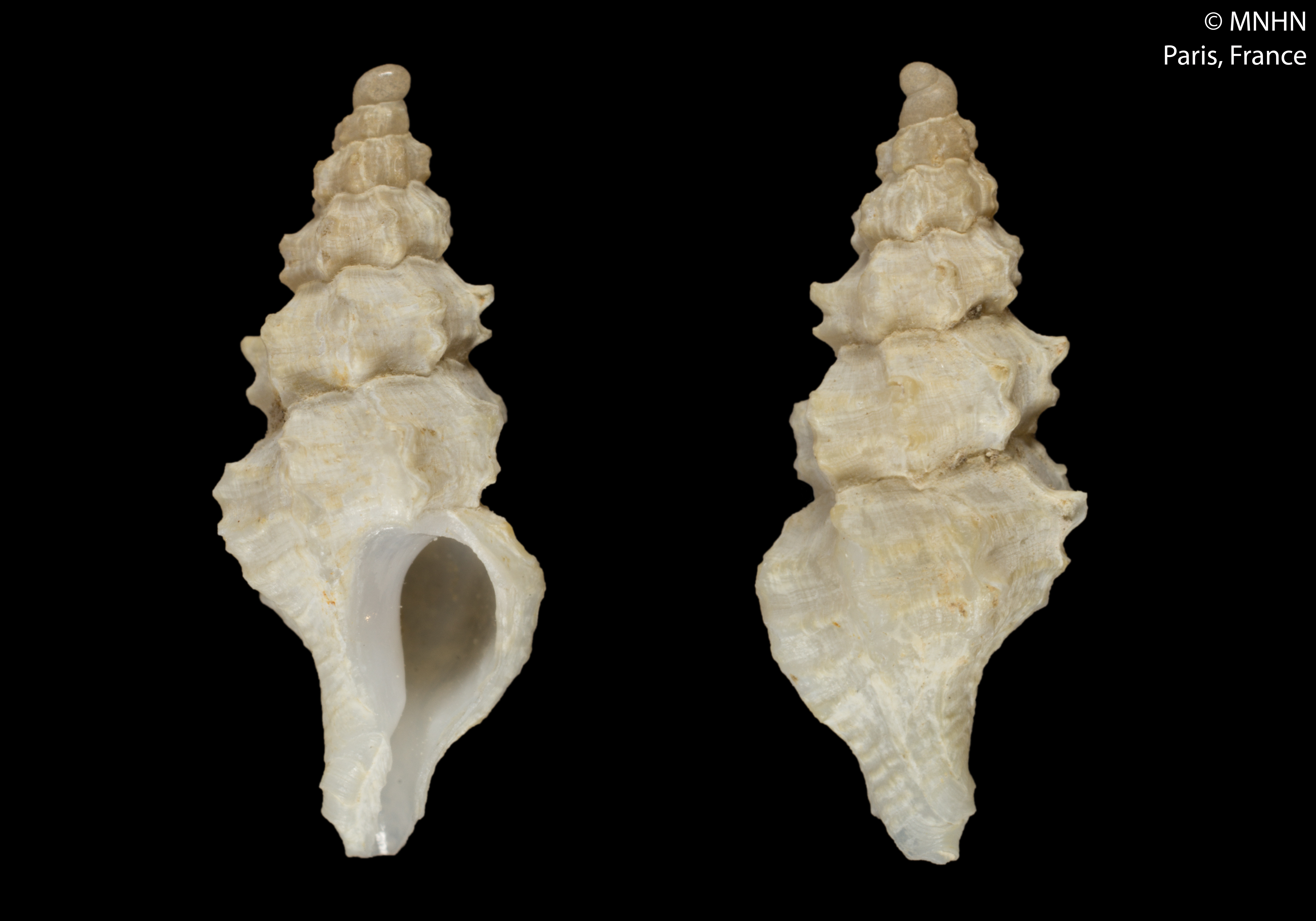
- Shell of Leptotrophon wareni (holotype at MNHN, Paris)

Scientific classification
- Kingdom: Animalia
- Phylum: Mollusca
- Class: Gastropoda
- Subclass: Caenogastropoda
- Order: Neogastropoda
- Superfamily: Muricoidea
- Family: Muricidae
- Subfamily: Trophoninae
- Genus: Leptotrophon
- Species: L. wareni

Binomial name
- Leptotrophon wareni Houart & Héros, 2012

= Leptotrophon wareni =

Species of gastropod

Leptotrophon wareni is a species of sea snail, a marine gastropod mollusk, in the family Muricidae, the murex snails or rock snails.

== Distribution ==
This species occurs off Papua New Guinea. and the Solomon Islands at depthst between 570 m and 756 m.
