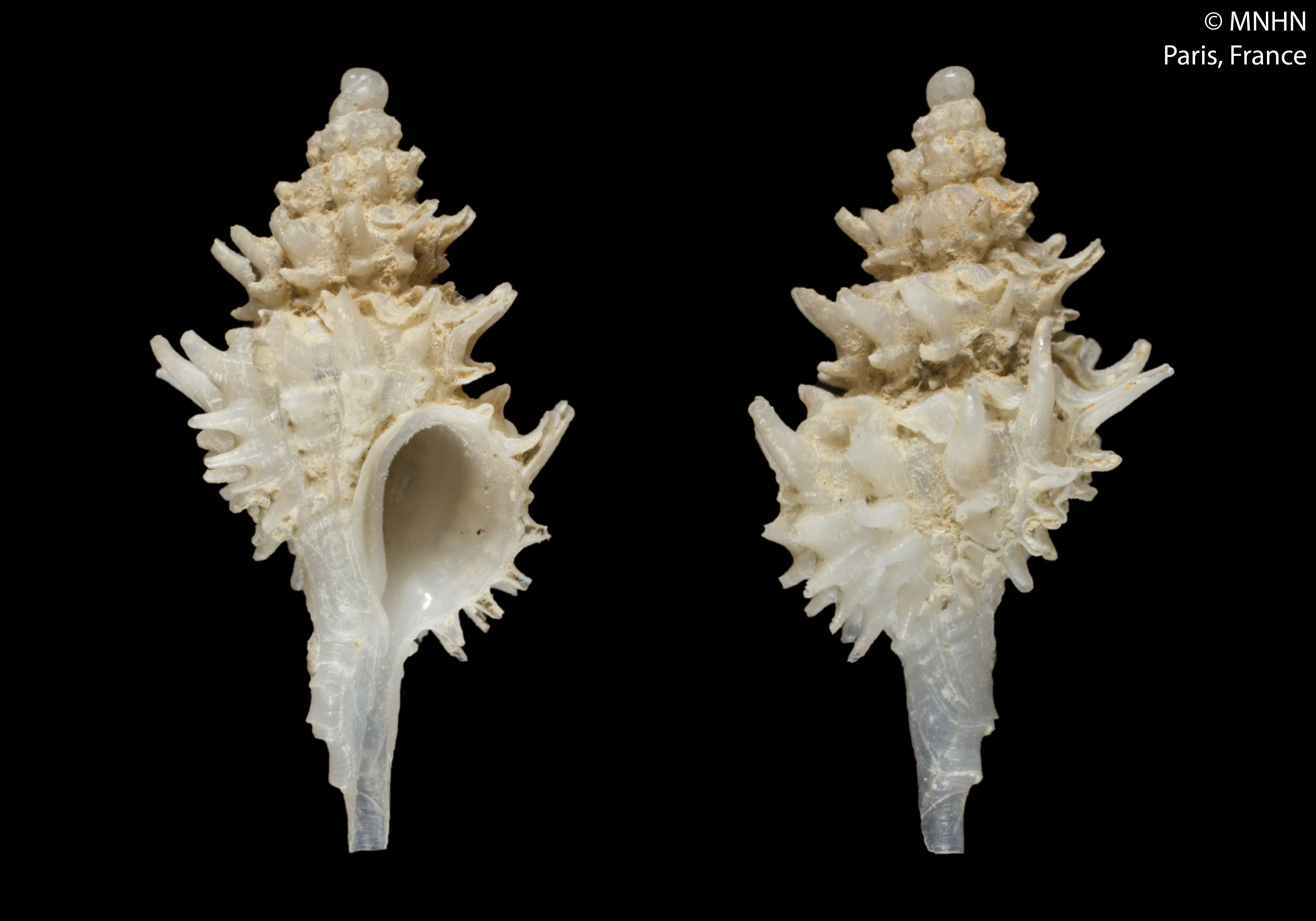

Scientific classification
- Kingdom: Animalia
- Phylum: Mollusca
- Class: Gastropoda
- Subclass: Caenogastropoda
- Order: Neogastropoda
- Family: Muricidae
- Genus: Leptotrophon
- Species: L. kastoroae

Binomial name
- Leptotrophon kastoroae Houart, 1997

= Leptotrophon kastoroae =

Species of gastropod

Leptotrophon kastoroae is a species of sea snail, a marine gastropod mollusk in the family Muricidae, the murex snails or rock snails.

== Description ==
The length of the shell attains 11.2 mm.

== Distribution ==
This marine species occurs off Indonesia.
