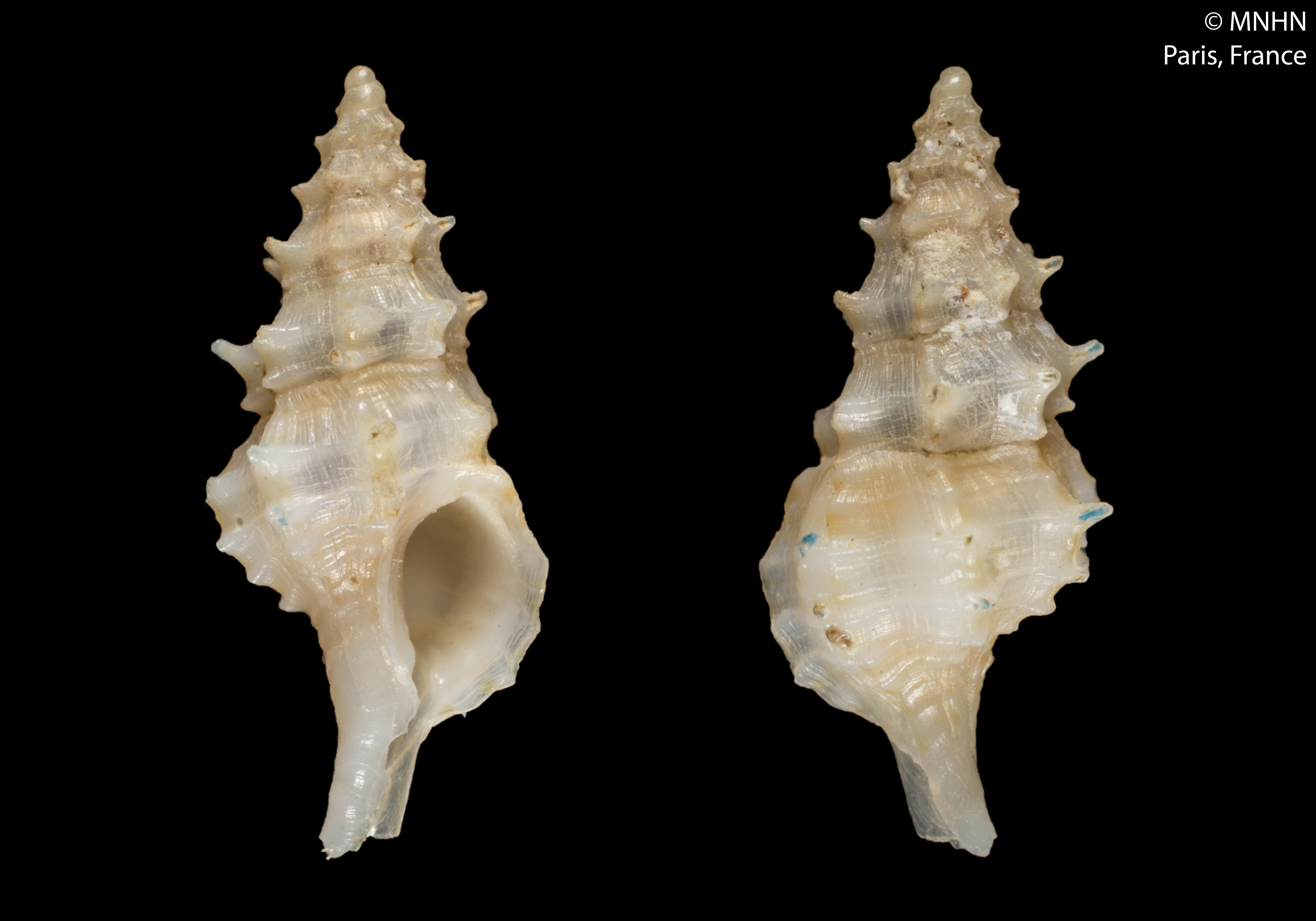
- Leptotrophon minispinosus

Scientific classification
- Kingdom: Animalia
- Phylum: Mollusca
- Class: Gastropoda
- Subclass: Caenogastropoda
- Order: Neogastropoda
- Family: Muricidae
- Genus: Leptotrophon
- Species: L. minispinosus

Binomial name
- Leptotrophon minispinosus Houart, 1995

= Leptotrophon minispinosus =

Species of gastropod

Leptotrophon minispinosus is a species of sea snail, a marine gastropod mollusk in the family Muricidae, the murex snails or rock snails.

== Description ==
This species exhibits dioecism, meaning individuals are distinctly male or female. Fertilization is internal, occurring within the oviduct.

The length of the shell attains 11.1 mm.

== Distribution ==
This marine species occurs off New Caledonia at a depth of 260 m.
