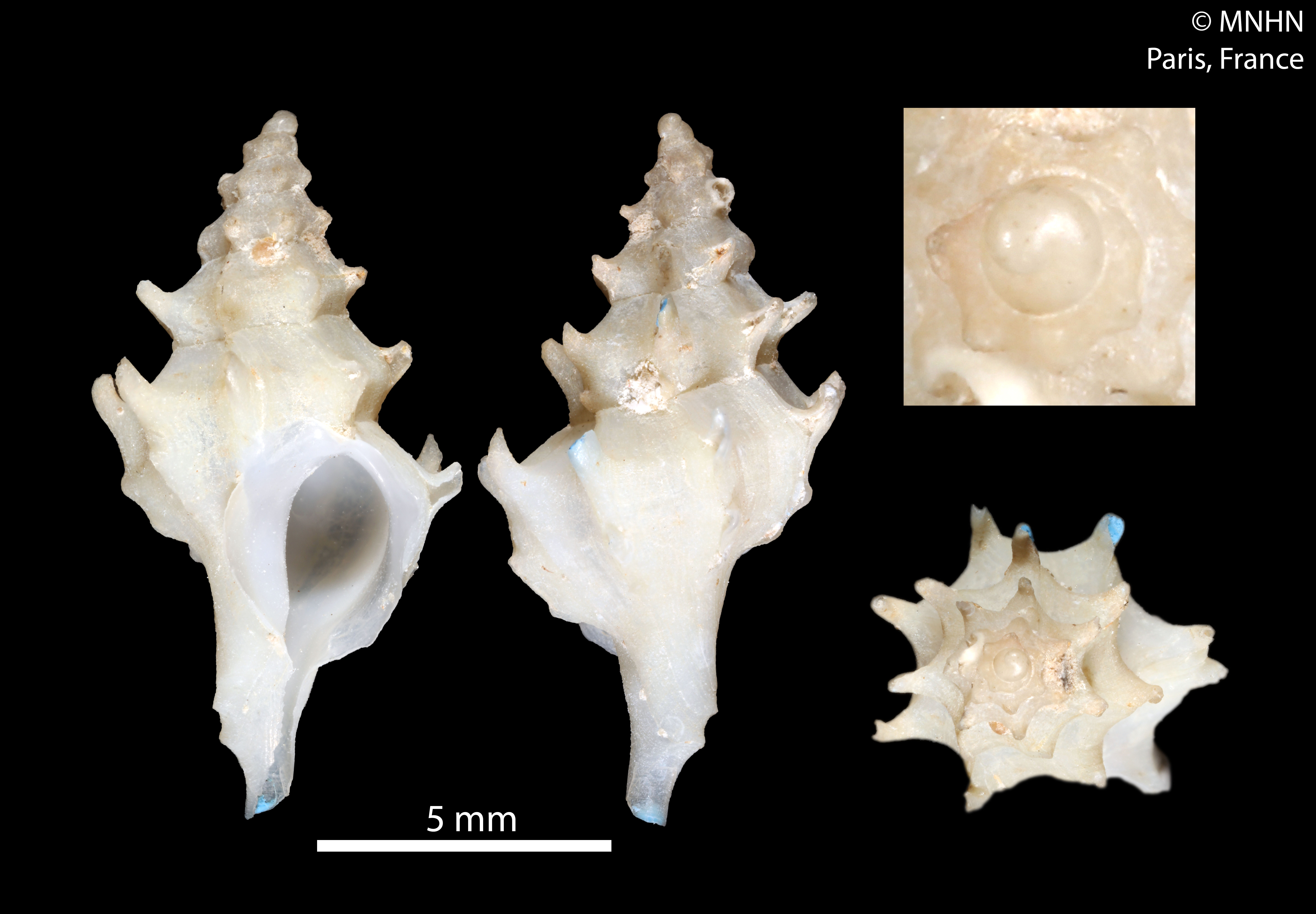
- Shell of Leptotrophon surprisensis (specimen at MNHN, Paris)

Scientific classification
- Kingdom: Animalia
- Phylum: Mollusca
- Class: Gastropoda
- Subclass: Caenogastropoda
- Order: Neogastropoda
- Family: Muricidae
- Genus: Leptotrophon
- Species: L. surprisensis

Binomial name
- Leptotrophon surprisensis Houart, 1995

= Leptotrophon surprisensis =

Species of gastropod

Leptotrophon surprisensis is a species of sea snail, a marine gastropod mollusk in the family Muricidae, the murex snails or rock snails.

== Description ==
The length of the shell attains 15 mm.

== Distribution ==
This marine species occurs off New Caledonia at a depth of 530 m.
