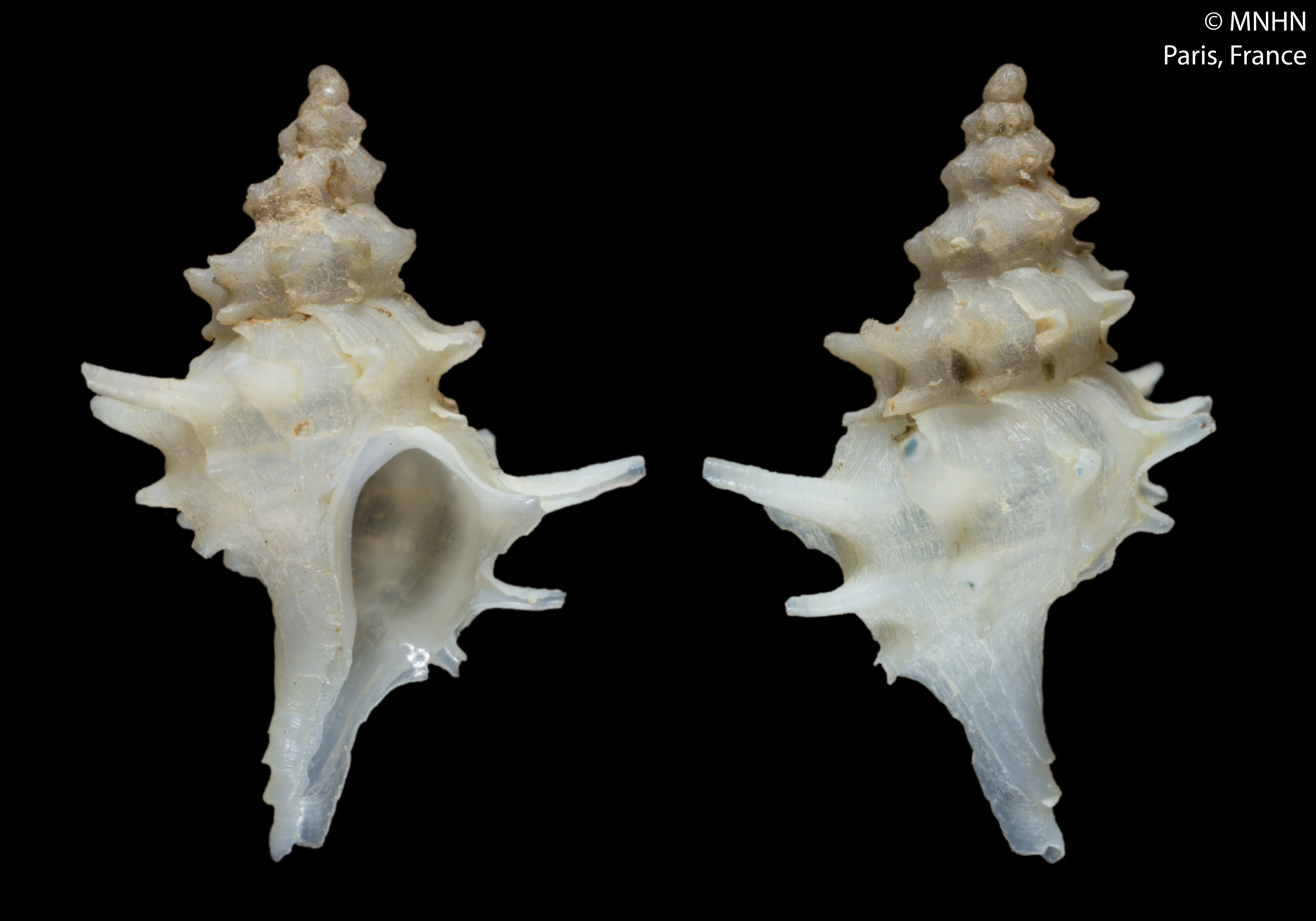
- Leptotrophon charcoti

Scientific classification
- Kingdom: Animalia
- Phylum: Mollusca
- Class: Gastropoda
- Subclass: Caenogastropoda
- Order: Neogastropoda
- Family: Muricidae
- Genus: Leptotrophon
- Species: L. charcoti

Binomial name
- Leptotrophon charcoti Houart, 1995

= Leptotrophon charcoti =

Species of gastropod

Leptotrophon charcoti is a species of sea snail, a marine gastropod mollusk in the family Muricidae, the murex snails or rock snails.

== Description ==
The length of the shell attains 13 mm.

== Distribution ==
This marine species occurs off New Caledonia.
