= Leptotrophon biocalae =

Scientific classification
- Kingdom: Animalia
- Phylum: Mollusca
- Class: Gastropoda
- Subclass: Caenogastropoda
- Order: Neogastropoda
- Family: Muricidae
- Genus: Leptotrophon
- Species: L. biocalae

Binomial name
- Leptotrophon biocalae Houart, 1995

Species of gastropod

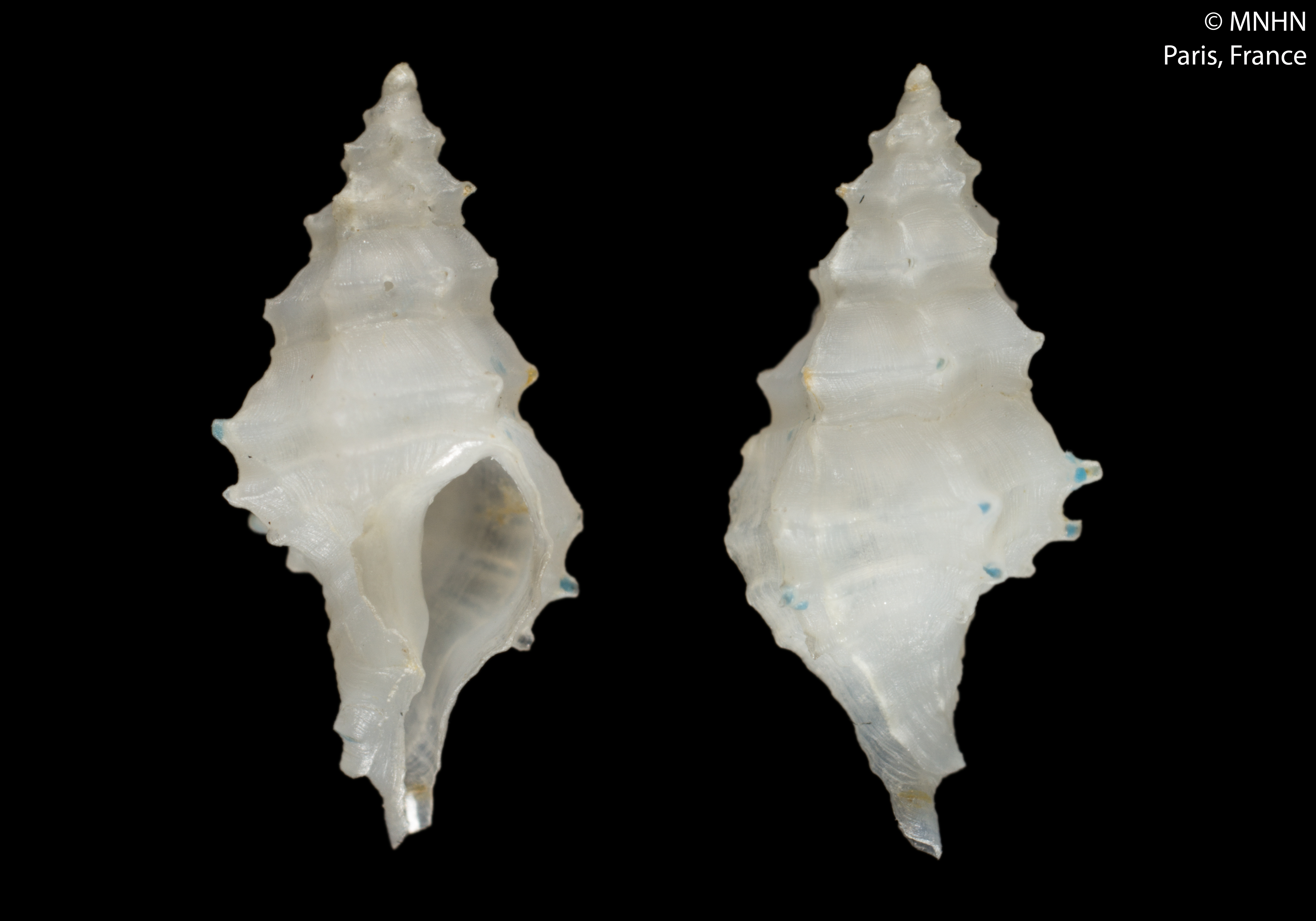
Leptotrophon biocalae Houart, 1995.

Leptotrophon biocalae is a species of sea snail, a marine gastropod mollusk in the family Muricidae, the murex snails or rock snails.

== Distribution ==
This marine species occurs off New Caledonia.
