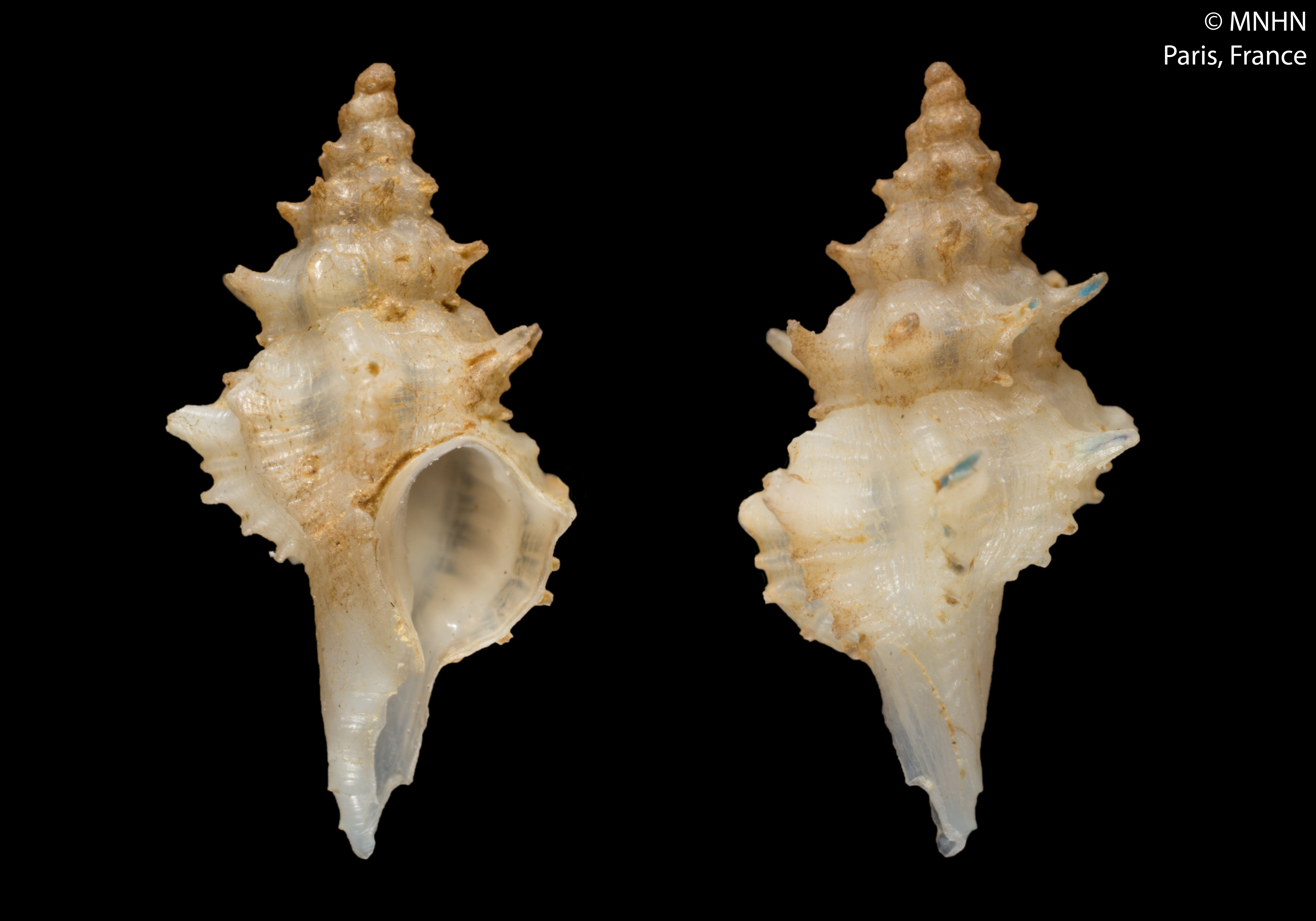

Scientific classification
- Kingdom: Animalia
- Phylum: Mollusca
- Class: Gastropoda
- Subclass: Caenogastropoda
- Order: Neogastropoda
- Family: Muricidae
- Genus: Leptotrophon
- Species: L. rigidus

Binomial name
- Leptotrophon rigidus Houart, 1995

= Leptotrophon rigidus =

Species of gastropod

Leptotrophon rigidus is a species of sea snail, a marine gastropod mollusk in the family Muricidae, the murex snails or rock snails.

== Description ==
The length of the shell attains 11.5 mm.

== Distribution ==
This marine species occurs off New Caledonia at depths between 435 m and 460 m.
