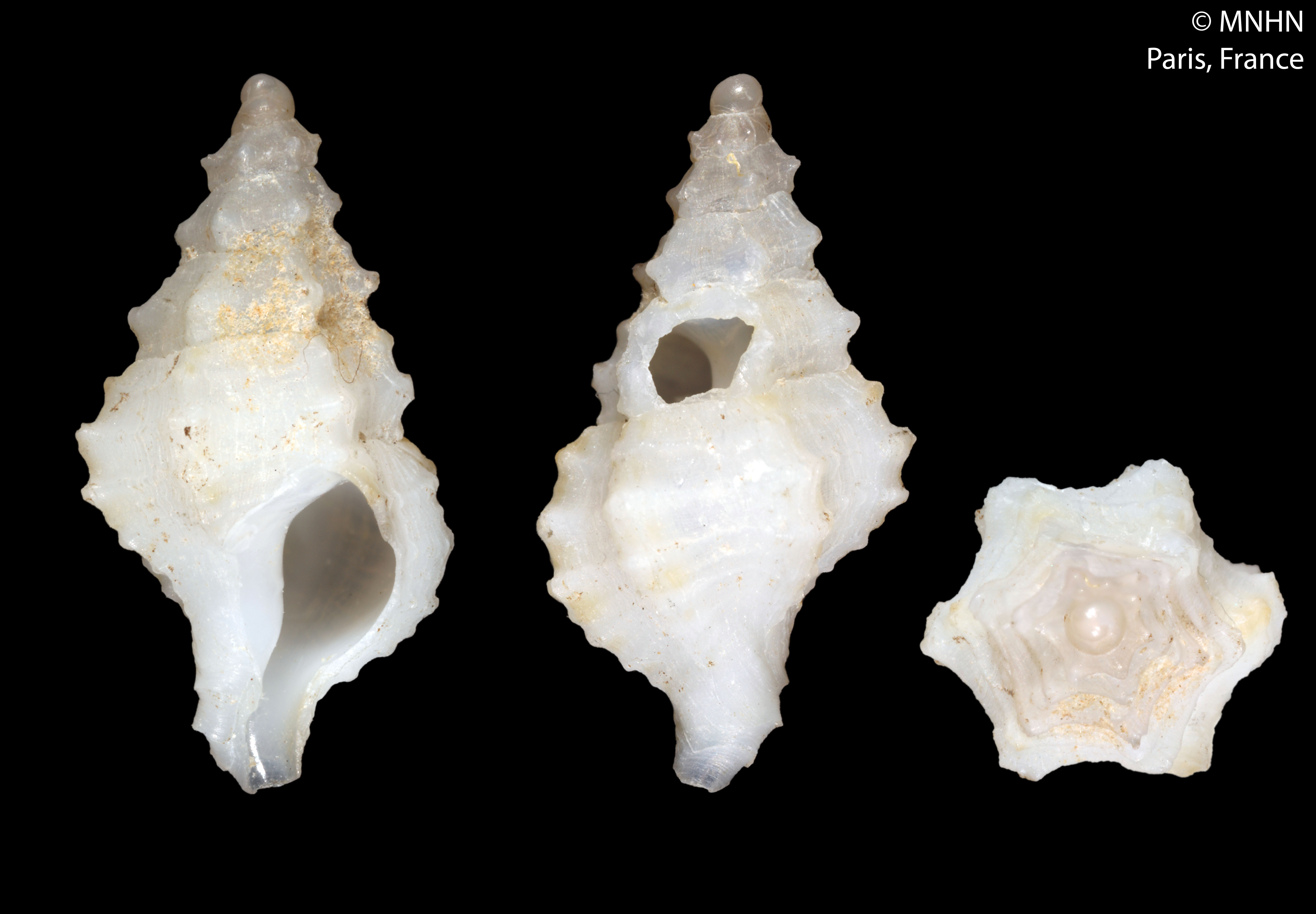
- Shell of Leptotrophon caledonicus (specimen at MNHN, Paris)

Scientific classification
- Kingdom: Animalia
- Phylum: Mollusca
- Class: Gastropoda
- Subclass: Caenogastropoda
- Order: Neogastropoda
- Superfamily: Muricoidea
- Family: Muricidae
- Subfamily: Trophoninae
- Genus: Leptotrophon; Houart, 1995

Type species
- Leptotrophon caroae Houart, 1995

= Leptotrophon =

Genus of gastropods

Leptotrophon is a genus of sea snails, marine gastropod mollusks in the subfamily Trophoninae of the family Muricidae, the murex snails or rock snails.

== Species ==
Species within the genus Leptotrophon include:

- Leptotrophon acerapex (Houart, 1986)
- Leptotrophon alis Houart, 2001
- Leptotrophon atlanticus Pimenta, do Couto & Santos Costa, 2008
- Leptotrophon bernadettae Houart, 1995
- Leptotrophon biocalae Houart, 1995
- Leptotrophon caledonicus Houart, 1995
- Leptotrophon caroae Houart, 1995
- Leptotrophon charcoti Houart, 1995
- Leptotrophon chlidanos Houart, 2001
- Leptotrophon coralensis Houart, 1995
- Leptotrophon coriolis Houart, 1995
- Leptotrophon fusiformis Houart, 2017
- Leptotrophon inaequalis Houart, 1995
- Leptotrophon kastoroae Houart, 1997
- Leptotrophon levii Houart, 1995
- Leptotrophon lineorugosus Houart, 1995
- Leptotrophon marshalli Houart, 1995
- Leptotrophon metivieri Houart, 1995
- Leptotrophon minirotundus (Houart, 1986)
- Leptotrophon minispinosus Houart, 1995
- Leptotrophon musorstomae Houart, 1995
- Leptotrophon perclarus Houart, 2001
- Leptotrophon protocarinatus Houart, 1995
- Leptotrophon richeri Houart, 1995
- Leptotrophon rigidus Houart, 1995
- Leptotrophon segmentatus (Verco, 1909)
- Leptotrophon spinacutus (Houart, 1986)
- Leptotrophon surprisensis Houart, 1995
- Leptotrophon turritellatus Houart, 1995
- Leptotrophon virginiae Houart, 1995
- Leptotrophon wareni Houart & Héros, 2012
