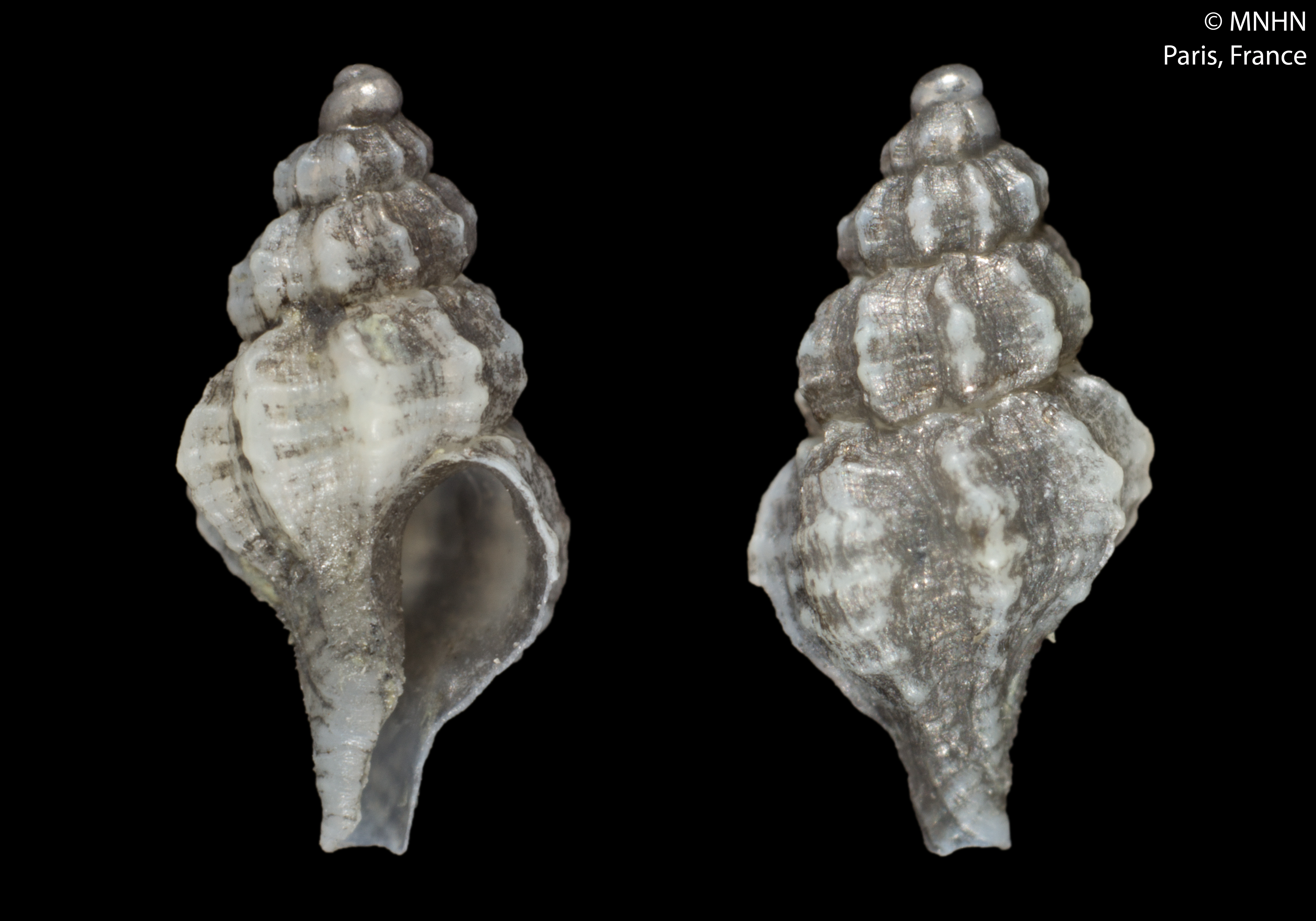

Scientific classification
- Kingdom: Animalia
- Phylum: Mollusca
- Class: Gastropoda
- Subclass: Caenogastropoda
- Order: Neogastropoda
- Family: Muricidae
- Genus: Leptotrophon
- Species: L. minirotundus

Binomial name
- Leptotrophon minirotundus (Houart, 1986)

Synonyms
- Trophon (Trophonopsis) minirotundus Houart, 1985 (basionym); Trophon minirotundus Houart, 1986 (original combination); Trophonopsis minirotunda (Houart, 1986)

= Leptotrophon minirotundus =

Species of gastropod

Leptotrophon minirotundus is a species of sea snail, a marine gastropod mollusk in the family Muricidae, the murex snails or rock snails.

== Description ==
The length of the shell attains 5 mm.

== Distribution ==
This species occurs in the Pacific Ocean off New Caledonia at depths between 250 m and 350 m.
