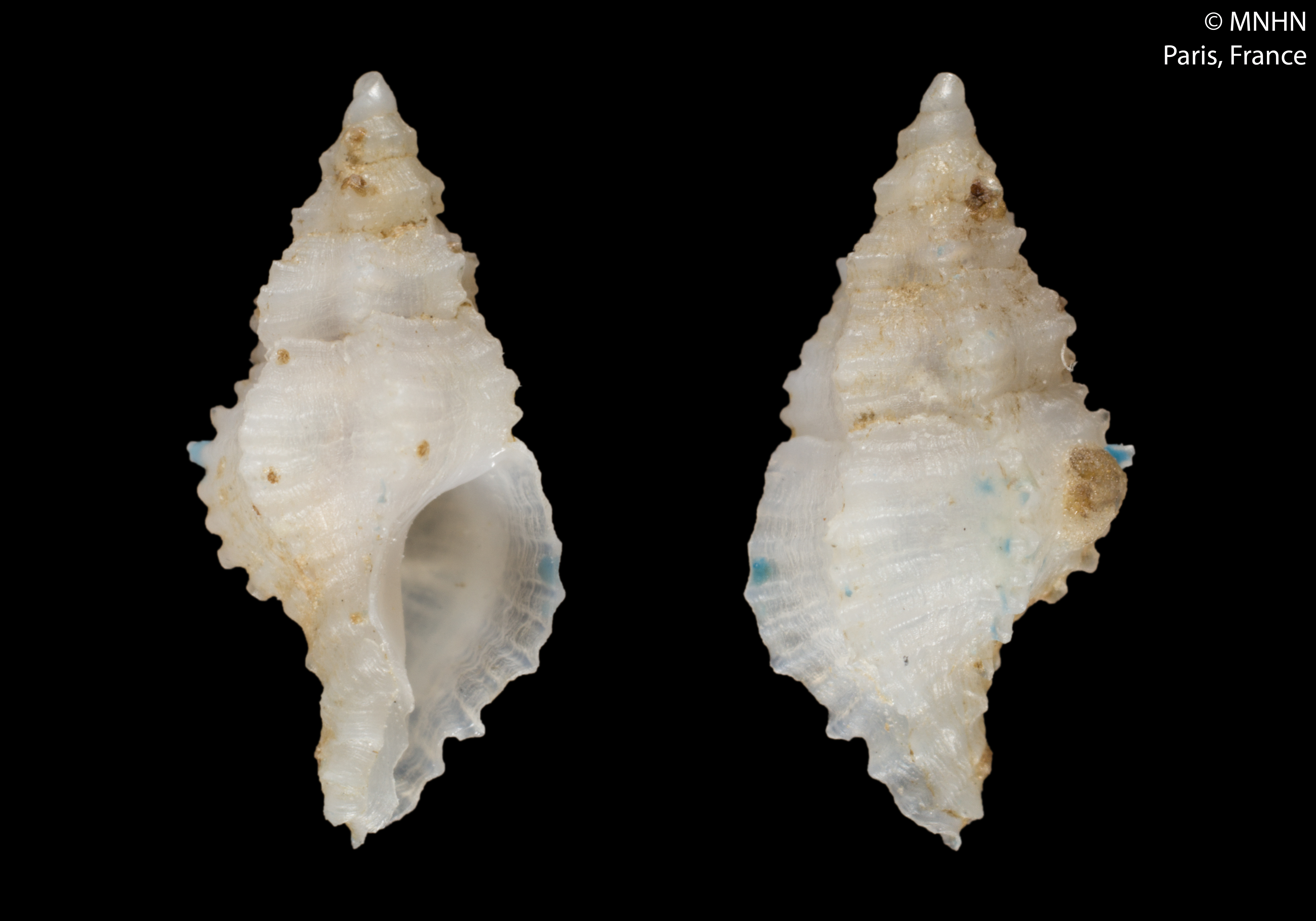
- Leptotrophon virginiae

Scientific classification
- Kingdom: Animalia
- Phylum: Mollusca
- Class: Gastropoda
- Subclass: Caenogastropoda
- Order: Neogastropoda
- Family: Muricidae
- Genus: Leptotrophon
- Species: L. virginiae

Binomial name
- Leptotrophon virginiae Houart, 1995

= Leptotrophon virginiae =

Species of gastropod

Leptotrophon virginiae is a species of sea snail, a marine gastropod mollusk in the family Muricidae, the murex snails or rock snails.

== Description ==
The length of the shell attains 8 mm.

== Distribution ==
This marine specimen occurs off New Caledonia at a depth of 250 m.
