= Leptotrophon atlanticus =

Scientific classification
- Kingdom: Animalia
- Phylum: Mollusca
- Class: Gastropoda
- Subclass: Caenogastropoda
- Order: Neogastropoda
- Family: Muricidae
- Genus: Leptotrophon
- Species: L. atlanticus

Binomial name
- Leptotrophon atlanticus Pimenta, do Couto & Santos Costa, 2008

Species of gastropod

Leptotrophon atlanticus is a species of sea snail, a marine gastropod mollusc in the family Muricidae, the murex snails or rock snails.
