= Leptotrophon acerapex =

Scientific classification
- Kingdom: Animalia
- Phylum: Mollusca
- Class: Gastropoda
- Subclass: Caenogastropoda
- Order: Neogastropoda
- Family: Muricidae
- Genus: Leptotrophon
- Species: L. acerapex

Binomial name
- Leptotrophon acerapex (Houart, 1986)

Synonyms
- Poirieria (Paziella) acerapex Houart, 1986

Species of gastropod

Leptotrophon acerapex is a species of sea snail, a marine gastropod mollusc in the family Muricidae, the murex snails or rock snails.

== Description ==
The length of the shell attains 9.2 mm.

== Distribution ==
This marine species occurs off New Caledonia.
