= Leptotrophon coralensis =

Scientific classification
- Kingdom: Animalia
- Phylum: Mollusca
- Class: Gastropoda
- Subclass: Caenogastropoda
- Order: Neogastropoda
- Family: Muricidae
- Genus: Leptotrophon
- Species: L. coralensis

Binomial name
- Leptotrophon coralensis Houart, 1995

Species of gastropod

Leptotrophon coralensis is a species of sea snail, a marine gastropod mollusk in the family Muricidae, the murex snails or rock snails.

== Description ==
The length of the shell attains 9.5 mm. The shell is an off-white spiral.

== Distribution ==
This marine species occurs in the Coral Sea off the coast of Australia and New Caledonia.
