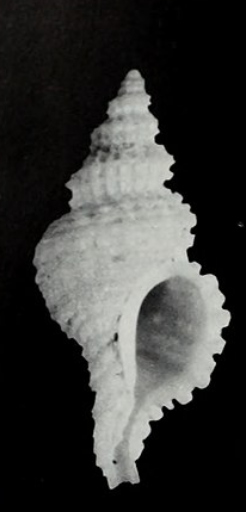
- Shell of Vaughtia babingtoni

Scientific classification
- Kingdom: Animalia
- Phylum: Mollusca
- Class: Gastropoda
- Subclass: Caenogastropoda
- Order: Neogastropoda
- Family: Muricidae
- Subfamily: Ocenebrinae
- Genus: Vaughtia
- Species: V. babingtoni

Binomial name
- Vaughtia babingtoni (G.B. Sowerby III, 1892)

Synonyms
- Murex (Ocenebra) babingtoni G. B. Sowerby III, 1892 (basionym); Murex (Ocinebra) babingtoni G. B. Sowerby III, 1892; Murex babingtoni Sowerby, 1892; Ocenebra aedicularum K.H. Barnard, 1969; Ocenebra semidisjuncta W.H. Turton, 1932; Tritonalia aedicularum Barnard, 1969; Tritonalia semidisjuncta Turton, 1932

= Vaughtia babingtoni =

Species of gastropod

Vaughtia babingtoni is a species of sea snail, a marine gastropod mollusk in the family Muricidae, the murex snails or rock snails.

== Description ==
The length of the shell attains 15 mm, its maximum diameter 8 mm.

This species is similar in sculpture to Vaughtia scrobiculata, from which it differs considerably in form, the spire being long and turreted, and the rostrum elongated and slightly recurved. In form the shell is somewhat similar to the British Trophonopsis muricata (Montagu, 1803)

== Distribution ==
This marine species occurs on the Agulhas Bank, South Africa.
