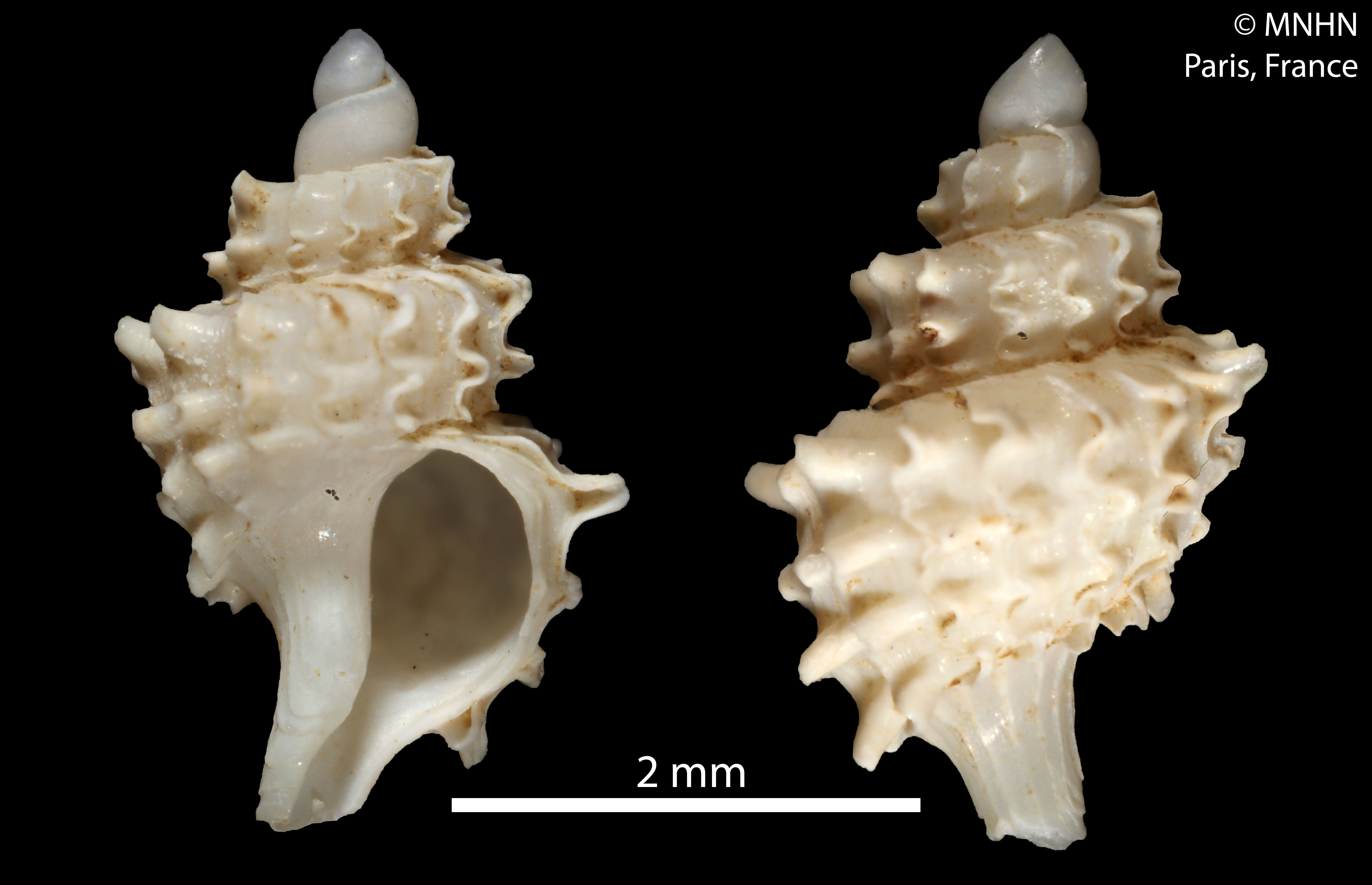
- Vaughtia transkeiensis

Scientific classification
- Kingdom: Animalia
- Phylum: Mollusca
- Class: Gastropoda
- Subclass: Caenogastropoda
- Order: Neogastropoda
- Family: Muricidae
- Subfamily: Ocenebrinae
- Genus: Vaughtia; Houart, 1995

Type species
- Murex babingtoni Sowerby, G.B. III, 1892

= Vaughtia =

Genus of gastropods

Vaughtia is a genus of sea snails, marine gastropod mollusks in the family Muricidae, the murex snails or rock snails.

== Species ==
Species within the genus Vaughtia include:

- Vaughtia babingtoni (G.B. Sowerby III, 1892)
- Vaughtia dawnbrinkae Lussi, 2012
- Vaughtia dunkeri (Krauss, 1848)
- Vaughtia fenestrata (Gould, 1860)
- Vaughtia gruveli (Dautzenberg, 1910)
- Vaughtia hayesi (Lorenz, 1995)
- Vaughtia jucunda (Thiele, 1925)
- Vaughtia olivemeyerae Lussi, 2012
- Vaughtia parvifusus Lussi, 2012
- Vaughtia purpuroides (Reeve, 1845)
- Vaughtia scrobiculata (Dunker, 1846)
- Vaughtia squamata Houart, 2003

Synonyms

- Vaughtia transkeiensis (Houart, 1987): synonym of Gemixystus transkeiensis (Houart, 1987)
