= Gemixystus stimuleus =

Scientific classification
- Kingdom: Animalia
- Phylum: Mollusca
- Class: Gastropoda
- Subclass: Caenogastropoda
- Order: Neogastropoda
- Family: Muricidae
- Genus: Gemixystus
- Species: G. stimuleus

Binomial name
- Gemixystus stimuleus (Hedley, 1907)

Synonyms
- Trophon stimuleus Hedley, 1907

Species of gastropod

Gemixystus stimuleus is a species of sea snail, a marine gastropod mollusk in the family Muricidae, the murex snails or rock snails.
