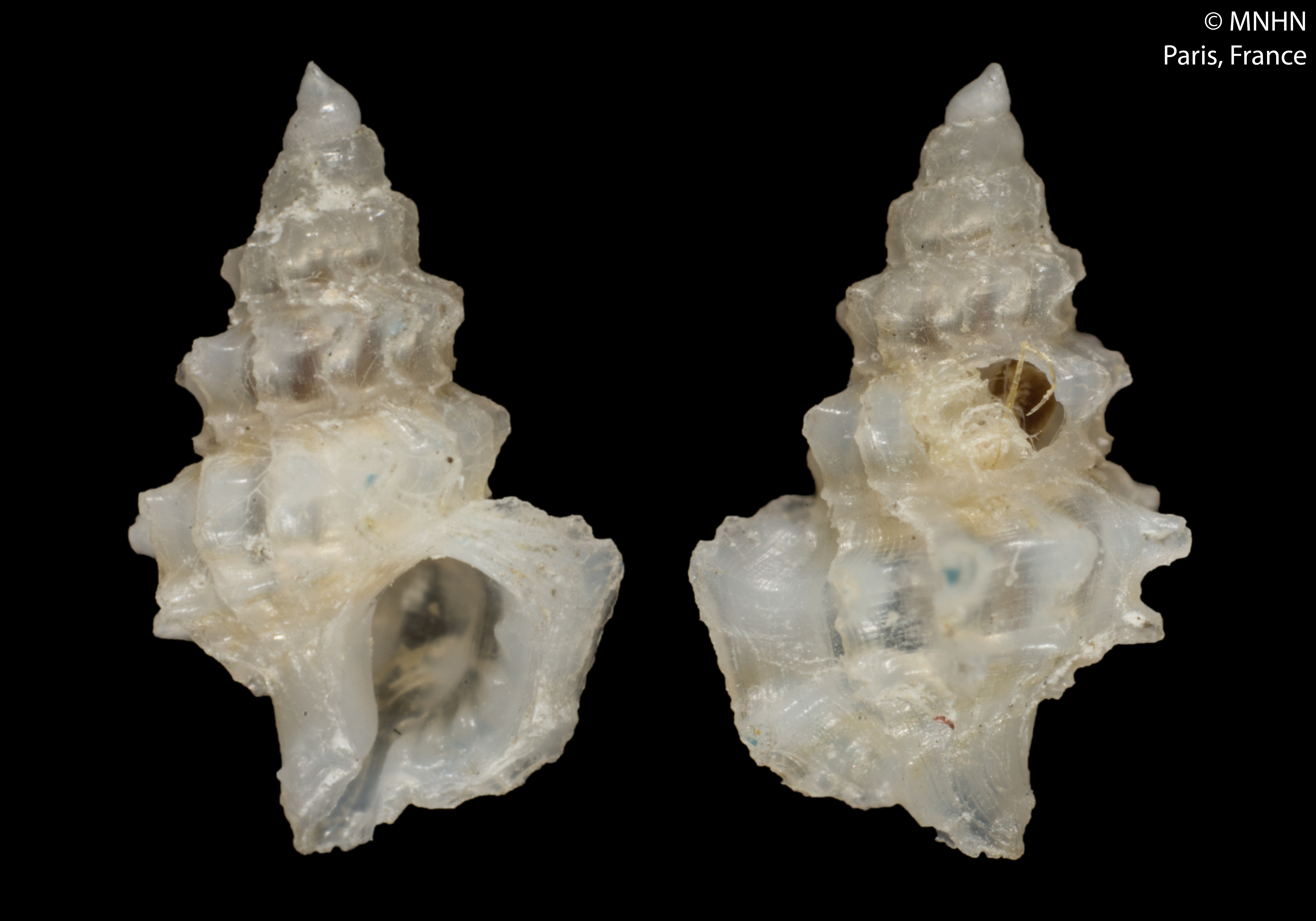

Scientific classification
- Kingdom: Animalia
- Phylum: Mollusca
- Class: Gastropoda
- Subclass: Caenogastropoda
- Order: Neogastropoda
- Family: Muricidae
- Genus: Gemixystus
- Species: G. leptos

Binomial name
- Gemixystus leptos (Houart, 1995)

Synonyms
- Apixystus leptos Houart, 1995

= Gemixystus leptos =

Species of gastropod

Gemixystus leptos is a species of sea snail, a marine gastropod mollusk in the family Muricidae, the murex snails or rock snails.

== Description ==
The shells of Gemixystus leptos are spinose and delicate, extending up to 5.3 mm in length. The spire of G. leptos shells is higher and has comparatively narrower spire whorls in comparison to other members of the genus Gemixystus.

== Distribution ==
This marine species occurs in the Coral Sea, off New Caledonia, the Chesterfield Islands and off Australia (Queensland).
