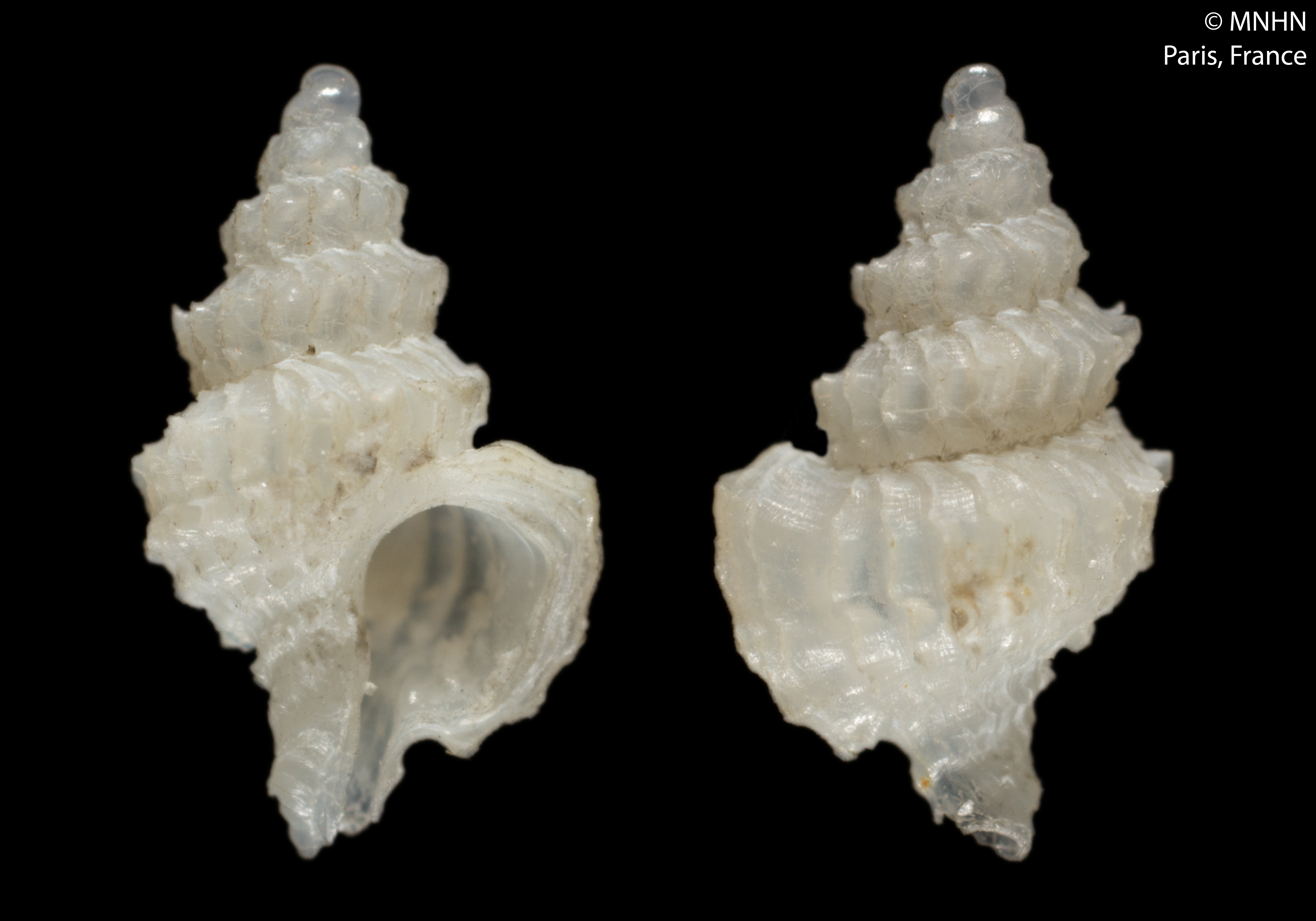
- Shell of Gemixystus calcareus

Scientific classification
- Kingdom: Animalia
- Phylum: Mollusca
- Class: Gastropoda
- Subclass: Caenogastropoda
- Order: Neogastropoda
- Superfamily: Muricoidea
- Family: Muricidae
- Subfamily: Trophoninae
- Genus: Gemixystus; Iredale, 1929

Type species
- Trophon laminatus Petterd, 1884

Synonyms
- Apixystus Iredale, 1929; Gemixystus (Apixystus) Iredale, 1929

= Gemixystus =

Genus of gastropods

Gemixystus is a genus of sea snails, marine gastropod mollusks in the subfamily Trophoninae of the family Muricidae, the murex snails or rock snails.

== Species ==
Species within the genus Gemixystus include:

- Gemixystus calcareus Houart & Héros, 2012
- Gemixystus fimbriatus Houart, 2004
- † Gemixystus hypsellus (Tate, 1888)
- † Gemixystus icosiphyllus (Tate, 1888)
- Gemixystus impolitus Houart & Héros, 2019
- Gemixystus laminatus (Petterd, 1884)
- Gemixystus lenis Houart & Héros, 2019
- Gemixystus leptos (Houart, 1995)
- Gemixystus polyphillius (Tenison-Woods, 1879)
- Gemixystus recurvatus (Verco, 1909)
- Gemixystus rhodanos Houart, 2004
- Gemixystus rippingalei (Houart, 1998)
- Gemixystus stimuleus (Hedley, 1907)
- Gemixystus transkeiensis (Houart, 1987)
- † Gemixystus zebra Houart, 2004

Species brought into synonymy

- Gemixystus apipagodus (Ponder, 1972) † : synonym of Xymenella apipagoda (Ponder, 1972) †
- Gemixystus comes (Maxwell, 1992) † : synonym of Xymenella comes (P. A. Maxwell, 1992) †
- Gemixystus protocarinatus (Laws, 1941) † : synonym of Xymenella protocarinata Laws, 1941 †
