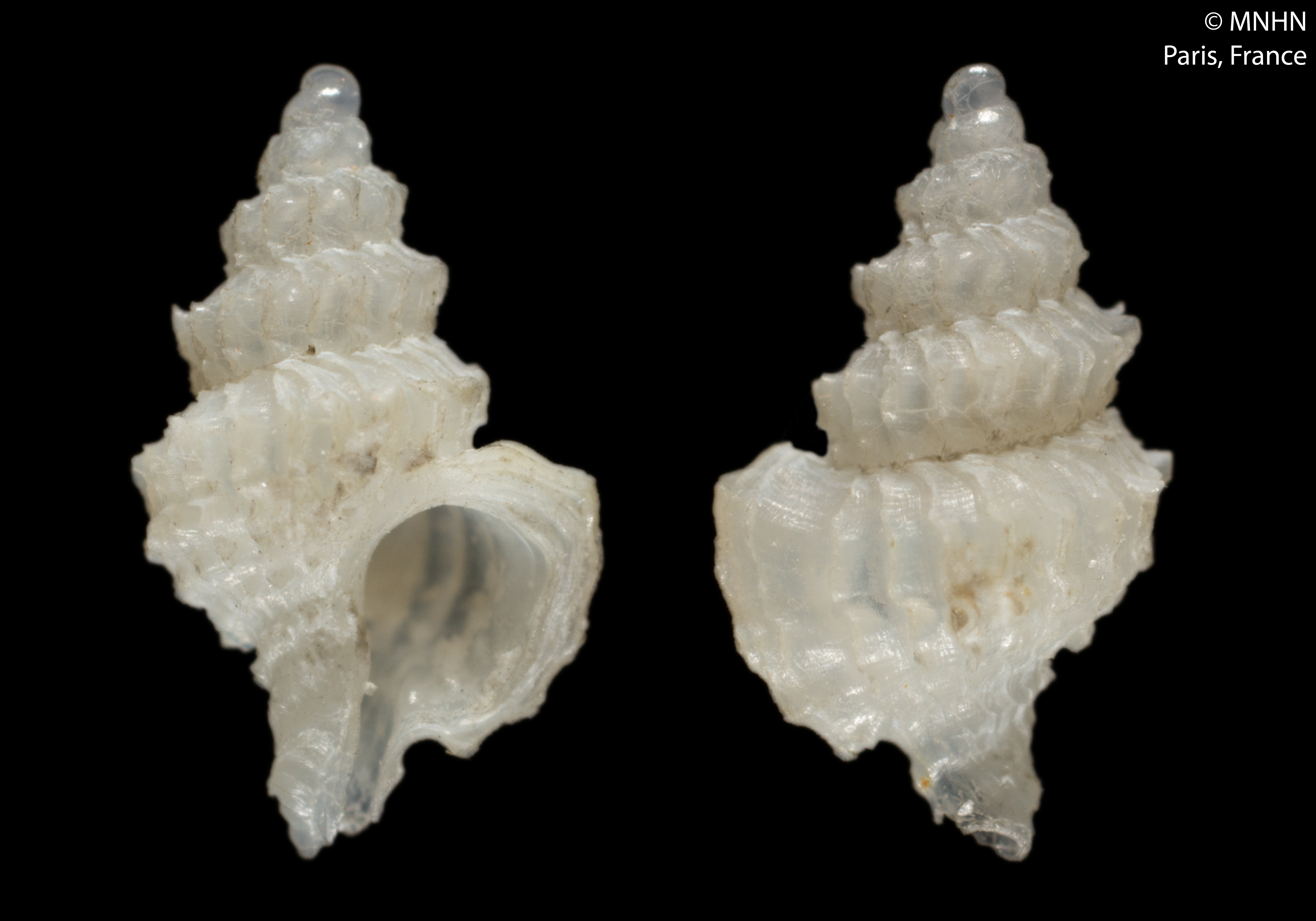
- Shell of Gemixystus calcareus (holotype at MNHN, Paris)

Scientific classification
- Kingdom: Animalia
- Phylum: Mollusca
- Class: Gastropoda
- Subclass: Caenogastropoda
- Order: Neogastropoda
- Superfamily: Muricoidea
- Family: Muricidae
- Subfamily: Trophoninae
- Genus: Gemixystus
- Species: G. calcareus

Binomial name
- Gemixystus calcareus Houart & Héros, 2012

= Gemixystus calcareus =

Species of gastropod

Gemixystus calcareus is a species of sea snail, a marine gastropod mollusk, in the family Muricidae, the murex snails or rock snails.

== Description ==
The length of the shell attains 5.4 mm.

== Distribution ==
This marine species occurs off the Chesterfield Archipelago, New Caledonia.
