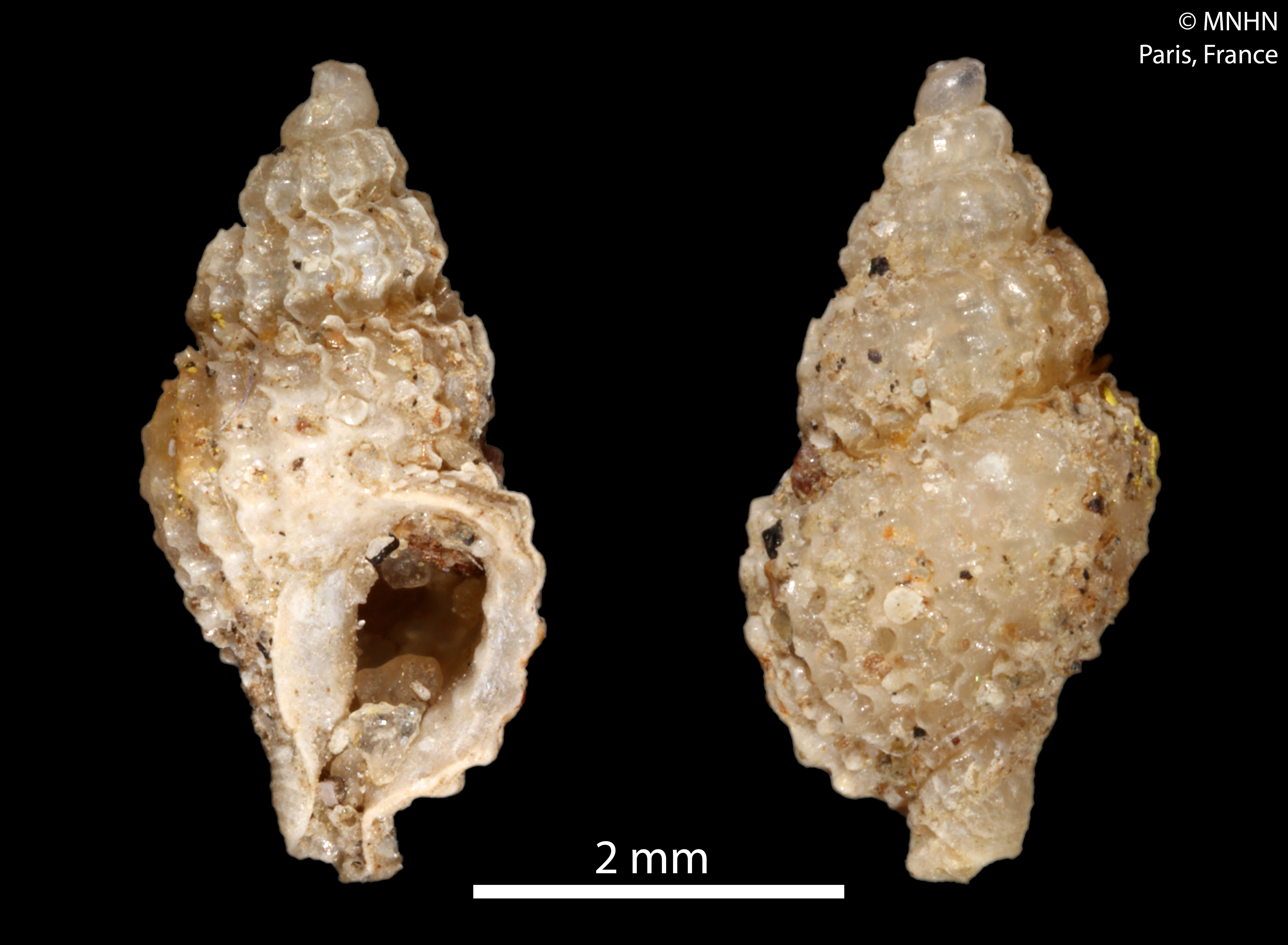
- Shell of Gemixystus rhodanos (paratype at MNHN, Paris)

Scientific classification
- Kingdom: Animalia
- Phylum: Mollusca
- Class: Gastropoda
- Subclass: Caenogastropoda
- Order: Neogastropoda
- Family: Muricidae
- Genus: Gemixystus
- Species: G. rhodanos

Binomial name
- Gemixystus rhodanos Houart, 2004

= Gemixystus rhodanos =

Species of gastropod

Gemixystus rhodanos is a species of sea snail, a marine gastropod mollusk in the family Muricidae, the murex snails or rock snails.

== Distribution ==
This marine species occurs off Queensland, Australia.
