= Vaughtia hayesi =

Scientific classification
- Kingdom: Animalia
- Phylum: Mollusca
- Class: Gastropoda
- Subclass: Caenogastropoda
- Order: Neogastropoda
- Family: Muricidae
- Genus: Vaughtia
- Species: V. hayesi

Binomial name
- Vaughtia hayesi (Lorenz, 1995)

Synonyms
- Ocenebra hayesi Lorenz, 1995

Species of gastropod

Vaughtia hayesi is a species of sea snail, a marine gastropod mollusk in the family Muricidae, the murex snails or rock snails.

== Description ==
The length of the shell attains 9.23 mm.

== Distribution ==
This marine species occurs off Algoa Bay, South Africa.
