= Gemixystus zebra =

Scientific classification
- Kingdom: Animalia
- Phylum: Mollusca
- Class: Gastropoda
- Subclass: Caenogastropoda
- Order: Neogastropoda
- Family: Muricidae
- Genus: Gemixystus
- Species: G. zebra

Binomial name
- Gemixystus zebra Houart, 2004

Species of gastropod

Gemixystus zebra is a species of sea snail, a marine gastropod mollusk in the family Muricidae, the murex snails or rock snails.
