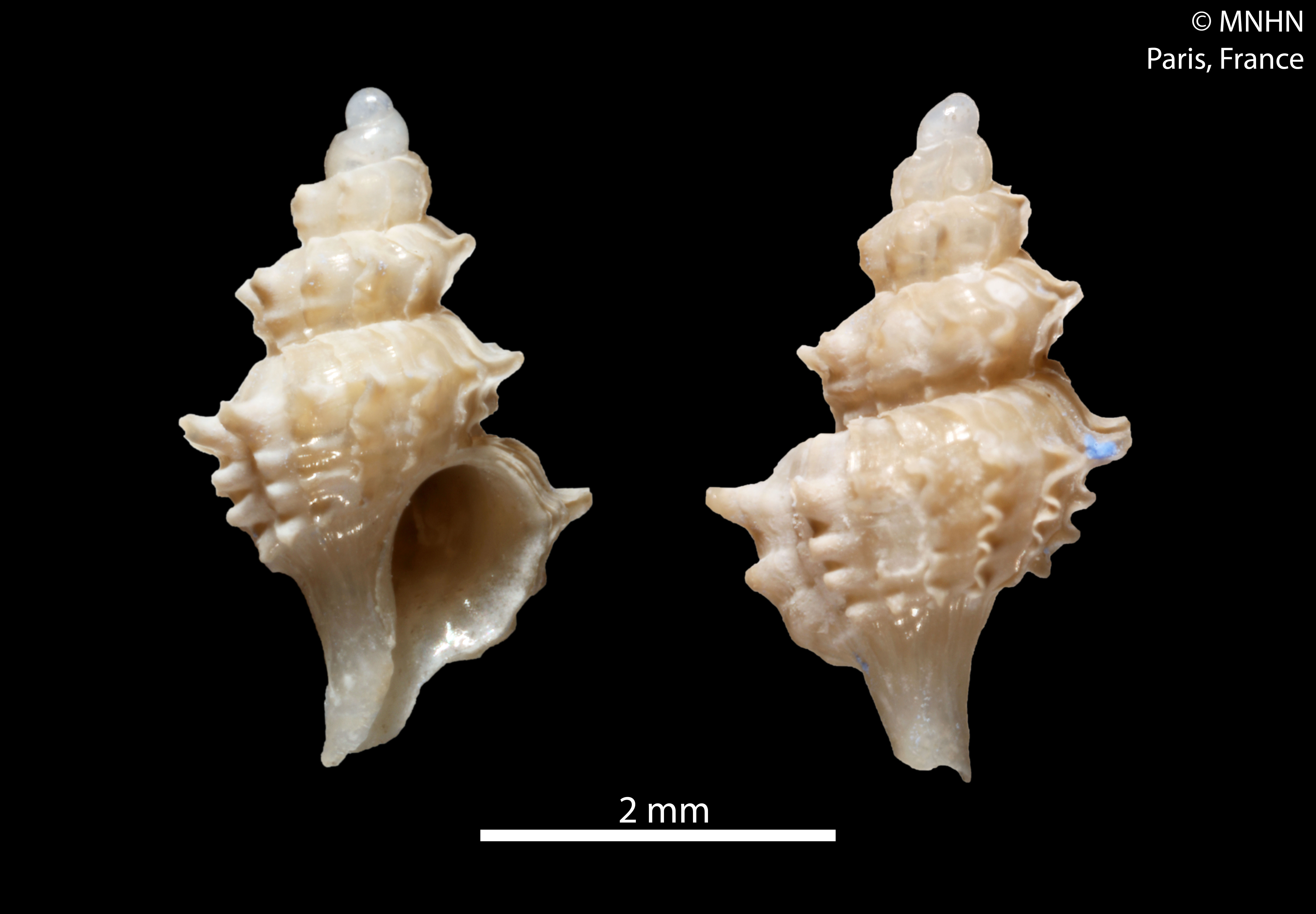
- Shell of Gemixystus rippingalei (paratype at MNHN, Paris)

Scientific classification
- Kingdom: Animalia
- Phylum: Mollusca
- Class: Gastropoda
- Subclass: Caenogastropoda
- Order: Neogastropoda
- Family: Muricidae
- Genus: Gemixystus
- Species: G. rippingalei

Binomial name
- Gemixystus rippingalei (Houart, 1998)

Synonyms
- Apixystus rippingalei Houart, 1998

= Gemixystus rippingalei =

Species of gastropod

Gemixystus rippingalei is a species of sea snail, a marine gastropod mollusk in the family Muricidae, the murex snails or rock snails.

== Distribution ==
This marine species occurs off Queensland, Australia.
