= Gemixystus polyphillius =

Scientific classification
- Kingdom: Animalia
- Phylum: Mollusca
- Class: Gastropoda
- Subclass: Caenogastropoda
- Order: Neogastropoda
- Family: Muricidae
- Genus: Gemixystus
- Species: G. polyphillius

Binomial name
- Gemixystus polyphillius (Tenison-Woods, 1879)

Synonyms
- Trophon polyphillia Tenison-Woods, 1879

Species of gastropod

Gemixystus polyphillius is a species of sea snail, a marine gastropod mollusk in the family Muricidae, the murex snails or rock snails.
