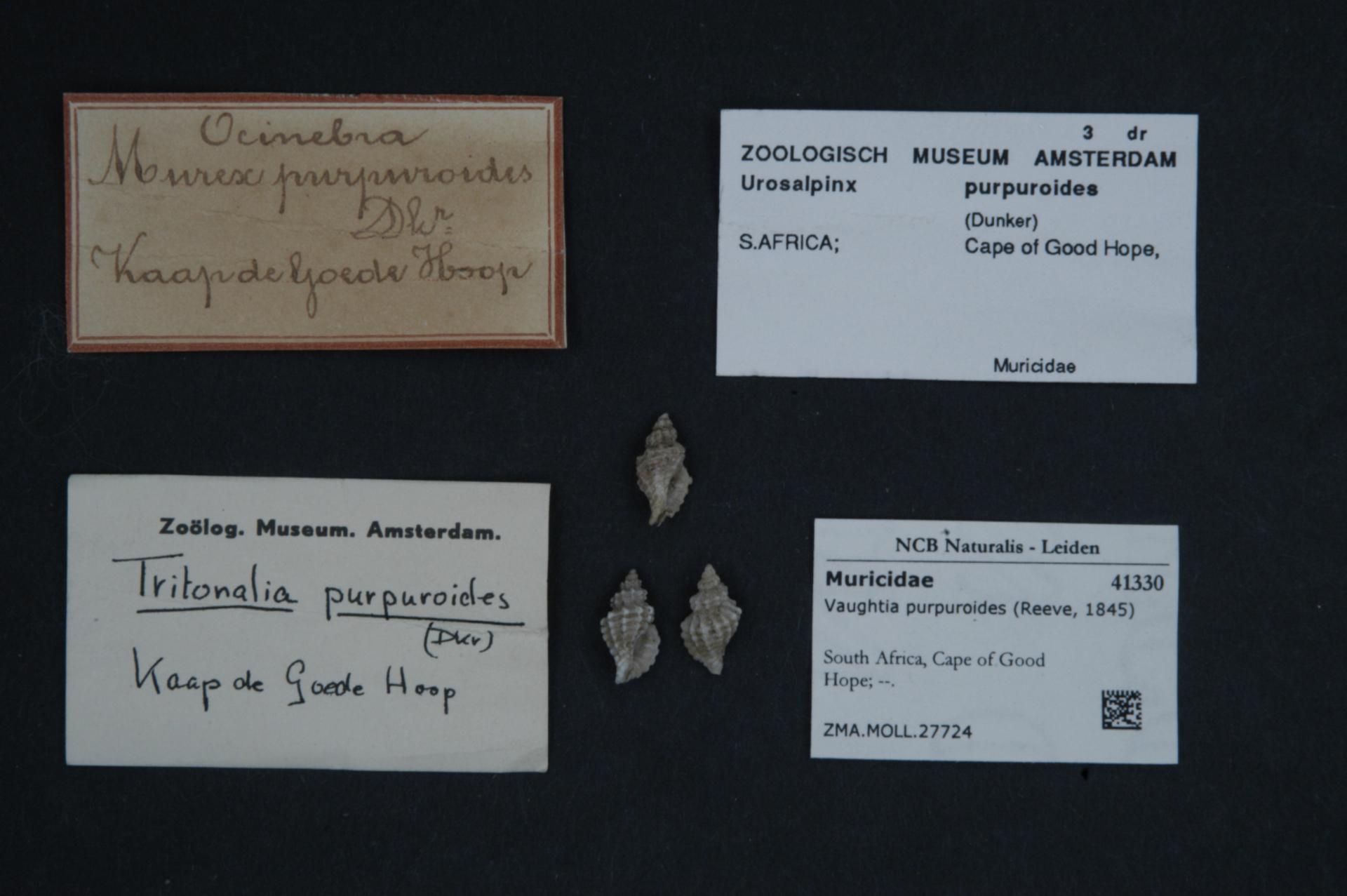
- Shell of Vaughtia purpuroides (specimen at Naturalis Biodiversity Center)

Scientific classification
- Kingdom: Animalia
- Phylum: Mollusca
- Class: Gastropoda
- Subclass: Caenogastropoda
- Order: Neogastropoda
- Family: Muricidae
- Subfamily: Ocenebrinae
- Genus: Vaughtia
- Species: V. purpuroides

Binomial name
- Vaughtia purpuroides (Reeve, 1845)

Synonyms
- Murex purpuroides Reeve, 1845 (basionym); Ocenebra purpuroides (Reeve, 1845)

= Vaughtia purpuroides =

Species of gastropod

Vaughtia purpuroides is a species of sea snail, a marine gastropod mollusc in the family Muricidae, the murex snails or rock snails.

== Distribution ==
This marine species occurs off Cape of Good Hope, South Africa.
