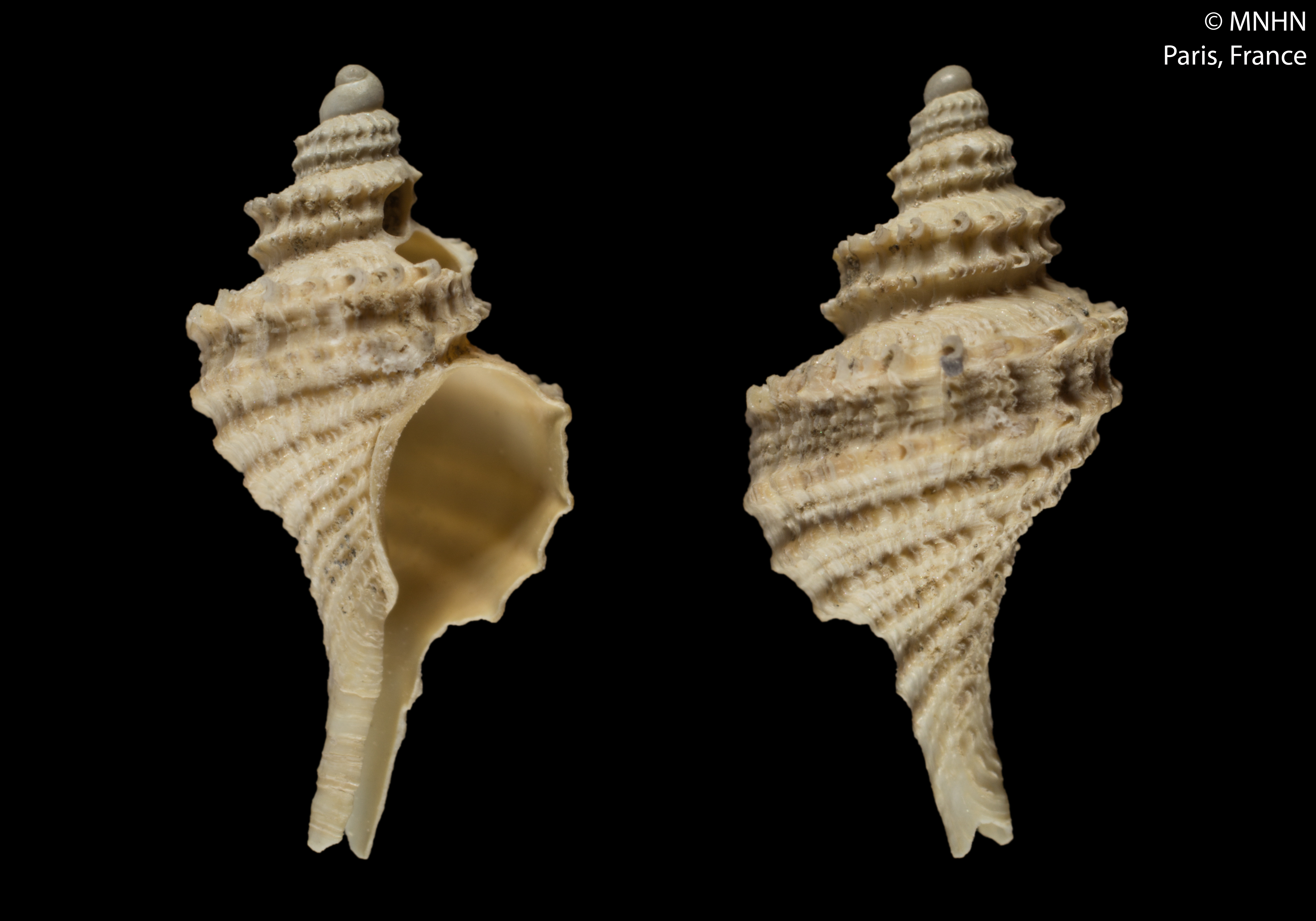
- Shell of Vaughtia squamata (holotype at MNHN, Paris)

Scientific classification
- Kingdom: Animalia
- Phylum: Mollusca
- Class: Gastropoda
- Subclass: Caenogastropoda
- Order: Neogastropoda
- Family: Muricidae
- Subfamily: Ocenebrinae
- Genus: Vaughtia
- Species: V. squamata

Binomial name
- Vaughtia squamata Houart, 2003

= Vaughtia squamata =

Species of gastropod

Vaughtia squamata is a species of sea snail, a marine gastropod mollusk in the family Muricidae, the murex snails or rock snails.

== Description ==
The length of the shell attains 15.5 mm.

== Distribution ==
This marine species occurs off Mauretania.
