= Gemixystus recurvatus =

Scientific classification
- Kingdom: Animalia
- Phylum: Mollusca
- Class: Gastropoda
- Subclass: Caenogastropoda
- Order: Neogastropoda
- Family: Muricidae
- Genus: Gemixystus
- Species: G. recurvatus

Binomial name
- Gemixystus recurvatus (Verco, 1909)

Synonyms
- Trophon recurvatus Verco, 1909

Species of gastropod

Gemixystus recurvatus is a species of sea snail, a marine gastropod mollusk in the family Muricidae, the murex snails or rock snails.
