= Gemixystus fimbriatus =

Scientific classification
- Kingdom: Animalia
- Phylum: Mollusca
- Class: Gastropoda
- Subclass: Caenogastropoda
- Order: Neogastropoda
- Family: Muricidae
- Genus: Gemixystus
- Species: G. fimbriatus

Binomial name
- Gemixystus fimbriatus Houart, 2004

Species of gastropod

Gemixystus fimbriatus is a species of sea snail, a marine gastropod mollusk in the family Muricidae, the murex snails or rock snails.
