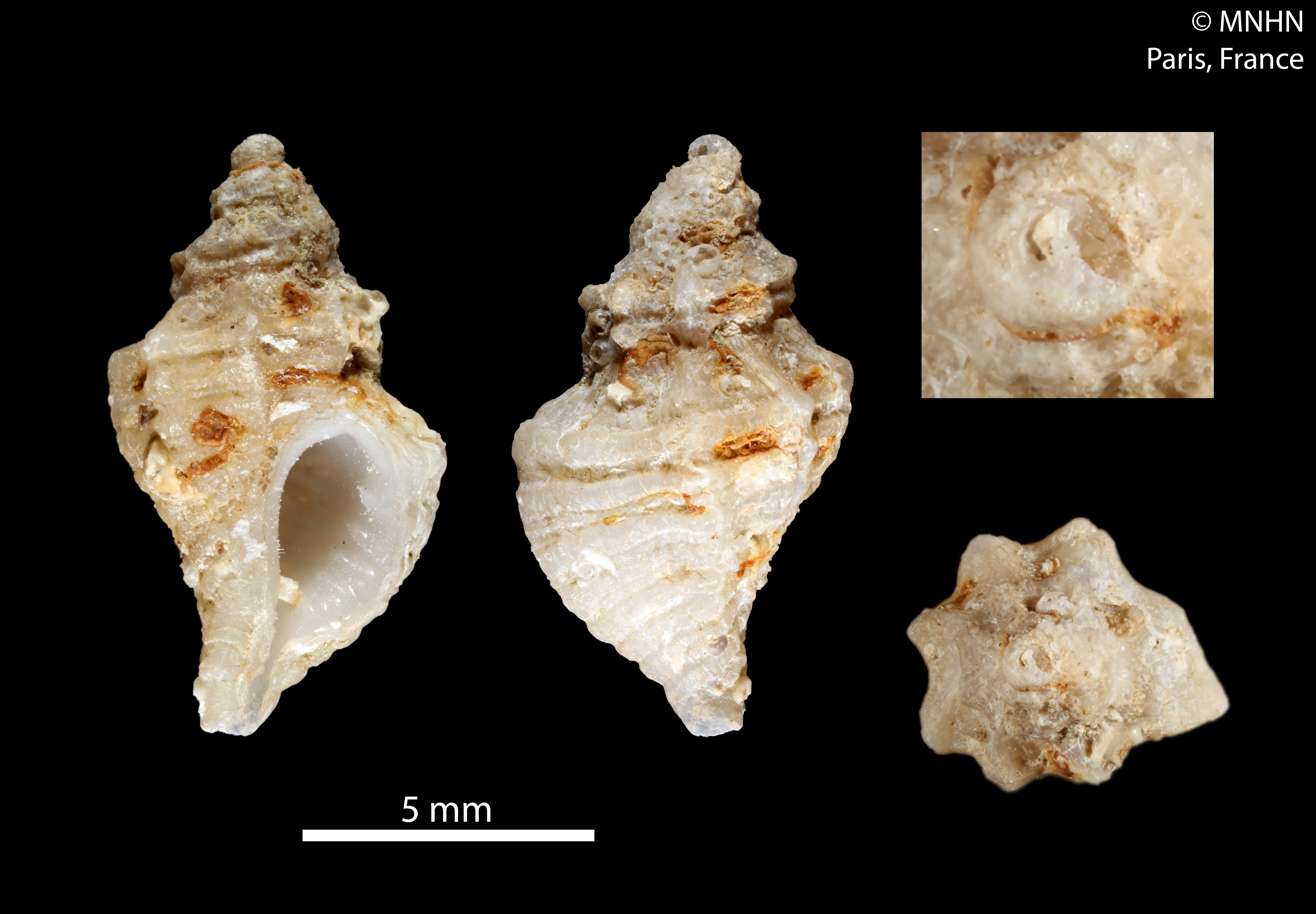
- Shell of Vaughtia dunkeri (paratype at MNHN, Paris)

Scientific classification
- Kingdom: Animalia
- Phylum: Mollusca
- Class: Gastropoda
- Subclass: Caenogastropoda
- Order: Neogastropoda
- Family: Muricidae
- Genus: Vaughtia
- Species: V. dunkeri

Binomial name
- Vaughtia dunkeri (Krauss, 1848)

Synonyms
- Murex dunkeri Krauss, 1848; Ocenebra newmani Lorenz, 1990

= Vaughtia dunkeri =

Species of gastropod

Vaughtia dunkeri is a species of sea snail, a marine gastropod mollusk in the family Muricidae, the murex snails or rock snails.

== Description ==
The length of the shell attains 13 mm.

The whorls are slightly shouldered, wide, with numerous ribs and revolving raised lines. The shell is yellowish, with a pale brown band. The aperture is large. The siphonal canal is short and open.

== Distribution ==
This marine species occurs off Cape of Good Hope, South Africa.
