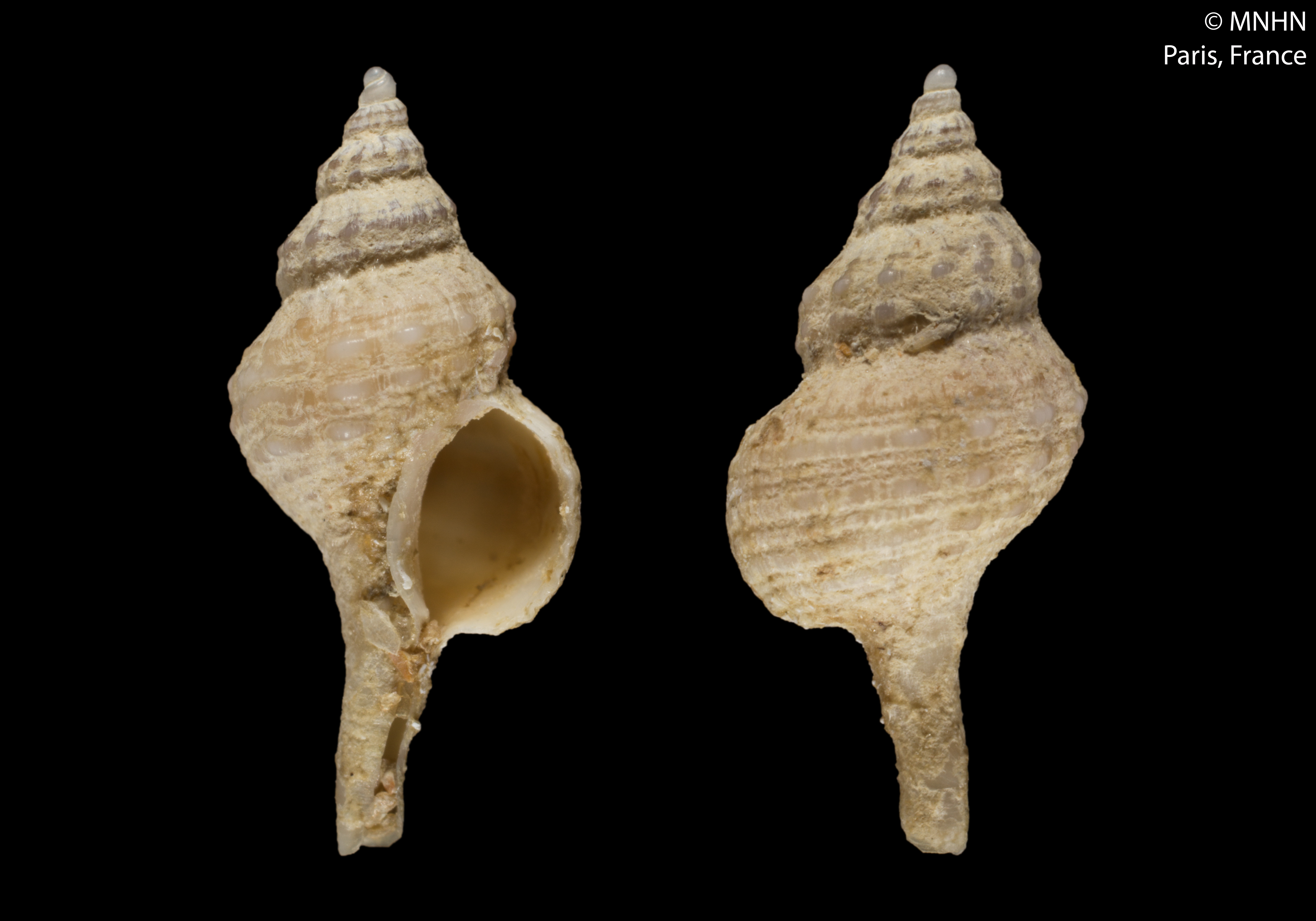
- Shell of Vaughtia gruveli (paratype at MNHN, Paris)

Scientific classification
- Kingdom: Animalia
- Phylum: Mollusca
- Class: Gastropoda
- Subclass: Caenogastropoda
- Order: Neogastropoda
- Family: Muricidae
- Subfamily: Ocenebrinae
- Genus: Vaughtia
- Species: V. gruveli

Binomial name
- Vaughtia gruveli (Dautzenberg, 1910)

Synonyms
- Trophon gruveli Dautzenberg, 1910 Trophonopsis gruveli Dautzenberg, 1910

= Vaughtia gruveli =

Species of gastropod

Vaughtia gruveli is a species of sea snail, a marine gastropod mollusk in the family Muricidae, commonly known as the murex snails or rock snails. It was originally described by the French malacologist Philippe Dautzenberg in 1910 under the genus Trophon, and has since been reassigned to the genus Vaughtia.

== Description ==
The shell of Vaughtia gruveli reaches a length of approximately 13 mm. It has a fusiform shape with a pointed spire and a moderately long siphonal canal, typical of the Muricidae family. The whorls are convex and ornamented with strong spiral cords and axial ribs, giving the shell a sculptured and robust appearance. The aperture is ovate, and the outer lip is thickened and often denticulate on the inner side. Coloration is generally pale to light brown, sometimes with darker markings, though coloration may vary between individuals.

The shell morphology, especially the pronounced sculpture, assists in camouflage among rocky substrates and may also serve to strengthen the shell against predation and environmental pressures.

== Etymology ==
The species is named in honor of Jean Abel Gruvel, a notable French marine biologist and colonial administrator who conducted extensive studies on the marine fauna of West Africa. Gruvel's contributions to marine biology in the early 20th century were significant, and the naming reflects the species' West African habitat and historical context of discovery.

== Distribution ==
Vaughtia gruveli is found in the eastern Atlantic Ocean, specifically off the coast of Western Sahara. It inhabits marine benthic zones, typically dwelling on rocky or sandy substrates at moderate depths. Although its exact depth range is not well documented, members of the genus Vaughtia are usually found from the shallow subtidal zone to depths exceeding 50 meters.

Specimens of this species have been collected during dredging expeditions and are preserved in natural history institutions such as the Muséum national d’Histoire naturelle (MNHN) in Paris.

== Ecology ==
Like other muricids, Vaughtia gruveli is carnivorous, feeding primarily on other invertebrates such as bivalves and barnacles. It uses its radula and acidic secretions to bore holes into the shells of prey. Its ecological role contributes to the regulation of benthic invertebrate populations in its habitat.

== Taxonomic Notes ==
The classification of this species has undergone changes since its original description. Initially placed in the genus Trophon, it was later reassigned to Trophonopsis and subsequently to Vaughtia. This reclassification is based on updated morphological and phylogenetic analyses within the subfamily Ocenebrinae.
