= Vaughtia dawnbrinkae =

Scientific classification
- Kingdom: Animalia
- Phylum: Mollusca
- Class: Gastropoda
- Subclass: Caenogastropoda
- Order: Neogastropoda
- Family: Muricidae
- Subfamily: Ocenebrinae
- Genus: Vaughtia
- Species: V. dawnbrinkae

Binomial name
- Vaughtia dawnbrinkae Lussi, 2012

Species of gastropod

Vaughtia dawnbrinkae is a species of sea snail, a marine gastropod mollusk in the family Muricidae, the murex snails or rock snails.

== Description ==
The length of the shell attains 11 mm.

== Distribution ==
This marine species occurs off the Eastern Cape, South Africa.
