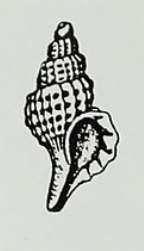
- Drawing of a shell of Vaughtia jucunda (holotype)

Scientific classification
- Kingdom: Animalia
- Phylum: Mollusca
- Class: Gastropoda
- Subclass: Caenogastropoda
- Order: Neogastropoda
- Family: Muricidae
- Genus: Vaughtia
- Species: V. jucunda

Binomial name
- Vaughtia jucunda (Thiele, 1925)

Synonyms
- Trophon jucundus Thiele, 1925

= Vaughtia jucunda =

Species of gastropod

Vaughtia jucunda is a species of sea snail, a marine gastropod mollusk in the family Muricidae, the murex snails or rock snails.

== Description ==
The length of the shell attains 12 mm.

== Distribution ==
This marine species occurs off Port Elizabeth, South Africa.
