= Gemixystus laminatus =

Scientific classification
- Kingdom: Animalia
- Phylum: Mollusca
- Class: Gastropoda
- Subclass: Caenogastropoda
- Order: Neogastropoda
- Family: Muricidae
- Genus: Gemixystus
- Species: G. laminatus

Binomial name
- Gemixystus laminatus (Petterd, 1884)

Synonyms
- Trophon laminatus Petterd, 1884

Species of gastropod

Gemixystus laminatus is a species of sea snail, a marine gastropod mollusc in the family Muricidae, the murex snails or rock snails.
