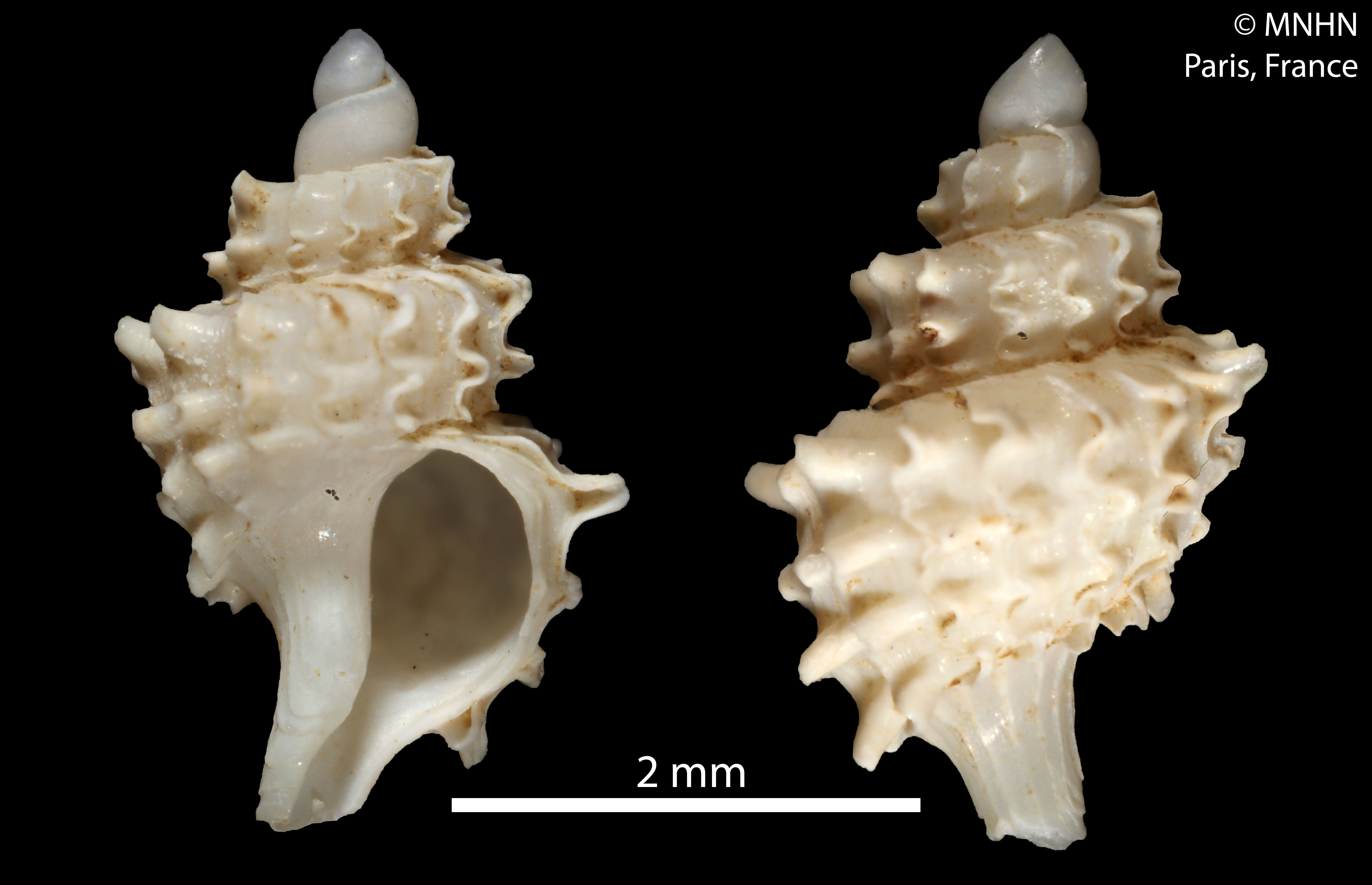

Scientific classification
- Kingdom: Animalia
- Phylum: Mollusca
- Class: Gastropoda
- Subclass: Caenogastropoda
- Order: Neogastropoda
- Family: Muricidae
- Genus: Gemixystus
- Species: G. transkeiensis

Binomial name
- Gemixystus transkeiensis (Houart, 1987)

Synonyms
- Apixystus transkeiensis Houart, 1987; Vaughtia transkeiensis (Houart, 1987)

= Gemixystus transkeiensis =

Species of gastropod

Gemixystus transkeiensis is a species of sea snail, a marine gastropod mollusk in the family Muricidae, the murex snails or rock snails.

== Distribution ==
This marine spêcies occurs off Transkei, South Africa.
