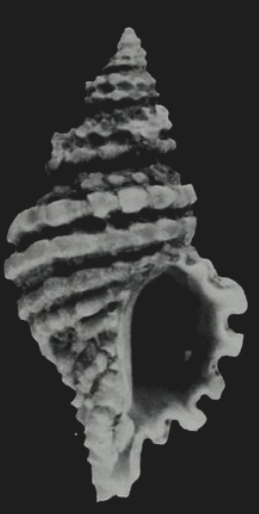
- Shell of Vaughtia scrobiculata

Scientific classification
- Kingdom: Animalia
- Phylum: Mollusca
- Class: Gastropoda
- Subclass: Caenogastropoda
- Order: Neogastropoda
- Family: Muricidae
- Subfamily: Ocenebrinae
- Genus: Vaughtia
- Species: V. scrobiculata

Binomial name
- Vaughtia scrobiculata (Dunker, 1846)

Synonyms
- Fusus scrobiculatus Dunker in Philippi, 1846; Fusus suborbiculatus Dunker in Philippi, 1846; Murex (Ocenebra) crawfordi G. B. Sowerby III, 1892 alternate representation (basionym); Murex crawfordi Sowerby, 1892; Ocenebra scrobiculata (Philippi, 1846); Purpura cribrosa Kuster, 1859; Trophon fossuliferus Tapparone Canefri, 1881; Urosalpinx scrobiculata (Dunker, 1846)

= Vaughtia scrobiculata =

Species of gastropod

Vaughtia scrobiculata is a species of sea snail, a marine gastropod mollusc in the family Muricidae, the murex snails or rock snails.

== Description ==
The length of the shell attains 14 mm.

(Described as Murex crawfordi G. B. Sowerby III, 1892) The solid shell is subventricose and acuminate. It is straw-colored. The sutures are channeled lengthwise. The shell consists of 5½ convex, rotund whorls with numerous raised lirae with small nodules cingulate in spirals. The body whorl is inflated and rotund. The aperture is ovate. The columella is smooth, slightly arcuate and abruptly truncated. The siphonal canal is very short. The outer lip is crenulate.

This species is closely allied to Vaughtia scrobiculata, but differs constantly in its shorter form, and the absence of a rostrum, the base of the columella being abruptly truncated. It may also be distinguished by the presence of an additional rib on the penultimate whorl.

== Distribution ==
This marine species occurs off Cape of Good Hope, South Africa.
