= List of marine gastropod genera in the fossil record =

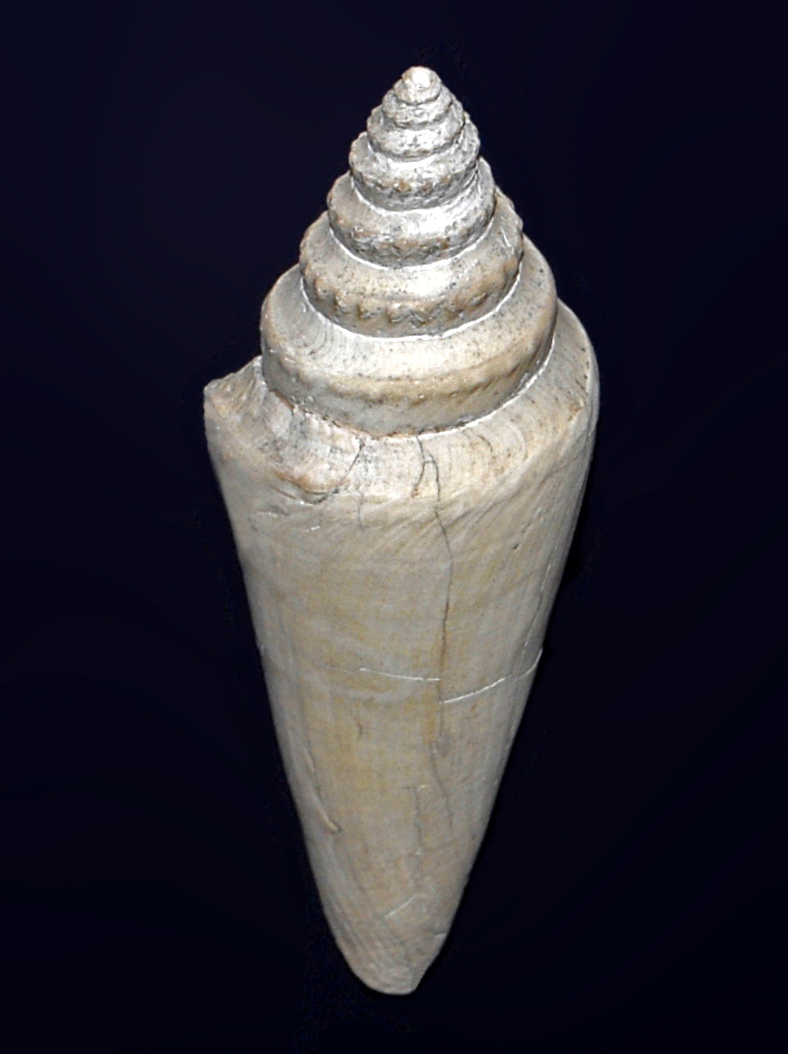
Conilithes antidiluvianus, a cone shell from the Pliocene of Italy

This list of marine gastropod genera in the fossil record is an attempt to list all the genera of sea snails or marine gastropod mollusks which have been found in the fossil record. Nearly all of these are genera of shelled forms, since it is relatively rare for gastropods without a shell (sea slugs) to leave any recognizable traces. It is also worth pointing out that this list of genera represents only a very tiny fraction of the number of genera that must actually have existed over the evolutionary time span: the fossil record is an extremely patchy and exceedingly incomplete pteryrecord of life on earth in earlier geological eras.

Many genera on this list are still extant, are still living now. On the current version of this list, some extant genera are mistakenly marked as extinct, with a "†" next to the name, but this should slowly become more accurate over time as corrections are made.

The list consists of formal genera names in the class Gastropoda; it excludes purely vernacular names. It shows all commonly accepted genera, but it also includes genera which are now considered invalid or doubtful (nomina dubia), and names that were not formally published (nomina nuda), as well as junior synonyms of more established names.

The list also includes some genera which were first described as gastropods, but which are no longer considered to be gastropods, and which in many cases are not even considered to be mollusks.

Genera are listed here alphabetically; no attempt has been made to group them in families or other higher taxa.

Contents:	A B C D E F G H I J K L M N O P Q R S T U V W X Y Z

== A ==
- Abderospira
- †Abretiella
- †Abylea
- †Acamptochetus
- †Acamptogenotia
- Acanthina
- †Acanthinucella
- †Acanthonema
- †Acanthotrophia
- †Aciculiscala
- †Acilia
- Acirsa
- †Acirsella
- †Acliceratia
- Aclis
- †Aclisina
- Acmaea
- †Acmaturris
- †Acme
- †Acominia
- †Acrilla
- †Acrilloscala
- †Acrocoelum
- †Acrocolpus
- †Acrocosmia
- †Acroreia
- †Acrosolarium
- †Acrospira
- †Acrostemma
- †Acrostylus
- Actaeon
- †Actaeonella
- †Actaeonellina
- †Actaeonema
- †Actaeonidea
- †Actaeonina
- †Actaeopyramis
- Acteocina
- Actinoleuca
- †Actinopsis
- †Actomphalus
- †Acuminia
- †Acupurpura
- †Adamnestia
- †Adelocythara
- Adelomelon
- †Ademtula
- †Adeorbis
- †Adinus
- †Adiozoptyxis
- †Admete
- †Admetopsis
- †Adusta
- †Aehmospira
- †Aeneator
- †Aepystoma
- †Aequispirella
- Aesopus
- †Afer
- †Affiniptyxis
- †Affrollonia
- †Aforia
- †Africoterebellum
- †Afriscrobs
- †Afrocornulina
- †Afrocypraea
- †Afrovolutilithes
- Agaronia
- †Agasoma
- Agatha
- †Agathirses
- †Agathistoma
- †Agathodonta
- †Agathotoma
- †Agatrix
- †Ageria
- †Agladrillia
- †Aglaoglypta
- †Agnesia
- †Agnewia
- †Agniesella
- †Aiptospira
- †Aizyella
- †Akburunella
- Akera
- Alaba
- †Alabina
- †Alaionema
- †Alariopsis
- †Alaskacirrus
- †Alaskiella
- †Alaskozygopleura
- †Alcidiella
- †Alcira
- Alcithoe
- †Aldrichia
- Alectrion
- Aletes
- †Algaroda
- Alia
- Aliculastrum
- †Aliger
- †Aliofusus
- †Allocosmia
- †Allostrophia
- †Alocaxis
- †Alocospira
- †Altaspiratella
- †Altivasum
- †Altomarginula
- †Altrix
- Alvania
- Alvinia
- Amaea
- Amalda
- †Amarophos
- †Amaura
- †Amaurellina
- †Amauropsina
- †Amauropsis
- †Amauropsona
- †Amaurotoma
- †Amberleya
- †Amblyacrum
- †Ambozone
- †Amekichilus
- †Amekicythara
- †Ameranella
- †Amonilea
- †Amorena
- Amoria
- †Ampezzamilda
- †Ampezzoella
- †Ampezzogyra
- †Ampezzopleura
- †Ampezzoscala
- †Ampezzotrochus
- †Amphinerita
- †Amphiperas
- †Amphiscapha
- Amphissa
- †Amphithalamus
- †Amphitomaria
- †Amphitrochus
- †Amplicolpus
- †Amplogladius
- †Amplosipho
- †Amplostoma
- Ampulla
- †Ampullella
- †Ampullina
- †Ampullinopsis
- †Ampullospira
- †Ampulonatica
- †Amuletum
- †Amyclina
- †Amyssodropa
- Anachis
- †Anacithara
- †Ananias
- †Anapepta
- †Anapetopsis
- †Anarconcha
- †Anastes
- Anatoma
- †Anazola
- †Anbullina
- †Anceps
- †Anchura
- Ancilla
- †Ancillarina
- †Ancillina
- Ancillista
- †Ancillopsis
- †Ancistrolepis
- †Ancistromesus
- †Ancistrosyrinx
- †Anculosa
- †Andangularia
- †Andicula
- †Andonia
- †Anematina
- †Aneurychilus
- †Aneurystoma
- Angaria
- †Anguillospira
- †Angularia
- †Angyomphalus
- †Anisomyon
- †Anisostoma
- †Annepona
- †Anodomaria
- †Anomalisipho
- †Anomalofusus
- †Anomalomya
- †Anomphalus
- †Anoptychia
- †Anoriostoma
- †Anozyga
- †Ansates
- †Antarctodarwinella
- †Anteglossia
- †Antepepta
- †Anticlimax
- †Anticonulus
- †Antiguraleus
- †Antillachelus
- Antillophos
- †Antimelatoma
- †Antimitra
- †Antinodulus
- Antiplanes
- Antisolarium
- †Antitrochus
- †Antizafra
- †Aoteadrillia
- †Apachella
- †Apataxia
- †Aphanoptyxis
- †Aphanotaenia
- †Aphera
- †Apicaria
- †Apiocypraea
- †Apiotoma
- †Aplocus
- Aplustrum
- Apollon (synonym of Ranella)
- Aporrhais
- †Appisania
- †Aptycholathyrus
- †Aptyxiella
- †Aptyxis
- †Aquilofusus
- †Araeodactylus
- †Araeonema
- †Araratella
- †Arastra
- †Arayina
- †Archicypraea
- †Archierato
- Archimediella
- †Archinacella
- Architectonica
- Arctomelon
- †Arcularia
- †Aremella
- Arene
- †Arestorides
- †Argalista
- †Arginula
- Argobuccinum
- †Argyrobessa
- †Argyropeza
- †Ariadnaria
- †Arisostoma
- †Aristerella
- †Aristerostrophia
- †Arizonella
- †Arjamannia
- †Armenostoma
- †Arrhoges
- †Arribazona
- †Arthessidae
- †Ascensovoluta
- †Ascolatirus
- †Aspa
- Aspella
- †Asperdaphne
- †Asperilla
- †Asperiscala
- †Aspidotheca
- †Astandes
- Astele
- Asteracmea
- †Asterohelix
- †Asthenotoma
- Astraea
- †Astralites
- Astralium
- Astyris
- Atalacmea
- †Ataphropsis
- †Ataphrus
- †Ataxocerithium
- †Ataxotrochus
- †Athleta
- Atilia
- †Atira
- †Atkinsonella
- Atlanta
- †Atlantobellerophon
- †Atoma
- †Atractotrema
- †Atraktus
- †Atresius
- †Atrimitra
- †Attenuata
- Attiliosa
- Atys
- †Aulacodiscus
- †Aulacofusus
- †Aulacostrepsis
- †Aulica
- †Aulicina
- †Aurelianella
- †Auriala
- †Aurina
- †Auriptygma
- †Auristomia
- †Auseria
- †Austerum
- †Australolaxispira
- †Australonema
- †Austriacopsis
- †Austroaporrhais
- †Austroclavus
- †Austrocochlis
- †Austrocominella
- †Austrocypraea
- †Austrodrillia
- †Austrofusus
- †Austroharpa
- †Austrolithes
- †Austromitra
- †Austrosassia
- †Austroscalata
- †Austrosphaera
- †Austrotoma
- †Austrotriton
- †Austrotrophon
- †Austroworthenia
- †Avellana
- †Awateria
- †Axelella
- †Axymene

== B ==
- †Babella
- †Babylonella
- Babylonia
- †Babylonites
- †Bactrocythara
- †Bactroptyxis
- †Bactrospira
- Bailya
- †Bajanerita
- †Bakonyia
- Balcis
- †Balinula
- †Bandelium
- †Bandellina
- †Banis
- †Bankivia
- †Barbarofusus
- †Barbotella
- Barleeia
- †Barnesella
- †Barocospira
- †Barrandecirrus
- †Barrealispira
- †Barroisucaulus
- Bartonia
- Bartschella (synonym of Turbonilla)
- †Barycypraea
- Baryspira (synonym of Amalda)
- †Basilirata
- †Basilissa
- †Basilitrona
- †Bassotrochus
- †Bastropia
- †Bathraspira
- †Bathrotomaria
- Bathybembix
- †Bathyclides
- †Bathygalea
- †Bathytoma
- Batillaria
- †Batillona
- †Bauxia
- †Bayania
- †Baylea
- †Bedeva
- †Beisselia
- †Bela
- †Belatomina
- Bellaspira
- †Bellastraea
- †Bellatara
- †Bellazona
- †Bellerophina
- †Bellerophon
- †Bellifusus
- †Belliscala
- †Belloliva
- †Belonidium
- †Belophos
- †Bembexia
- †Bembicium
- †Bembridgia
- †Bendeia
- †Benoistea
- †Benthomangelia
- †Beraua
- †Beraunia
- †Beretra
- †Beringius
- †Berlieria
- †Bernaya
- †Berthelinia
- Besla
- †Beyrichidiscus
- †Bezanconia
- †Biangularia
- †Bicarina
- †Bicarinella
- †Bicatillus
- †Bifidoscala
- †Biformispira
- †Bifurcium
- †Bigotella
- †Billiemia
- †Biplex
- †Biplica
- Bittiolum
- †Bittiscala
- Bittium
- †Bivetiella
- †Bivetopsia
- †Bivonia
- †Blackdownia
- †Blancia
- †Blasicrura
- †Boeckhia
- †Boehmiola
- †Boettgeriola
- †Boggsia
- †Bohaispira
- †Bohaispiropsis
- †Boiotremus
- Bolinus
- †Bolis
- †Bolma
- †Boltenella
- †Bonellitia
- †Bonnetella
- †Boreocomitas
- †Boreoscala
- Boreotrophon
- †Borestus
- †Borsonella
- †Borsonia
- †Boucotspira
- †Boucotspira
- †Bourgetia
- †Boutillieria
- †Bovicornu
- †Bowdenagaza
- †Bowdenatheca
- †Brachycerithium
- †Brachycythara
- †Brachysphingus
- †Brachystoma
- †Brachystomia
- †Brachytoma
- †Brachytomaria
- †Brachytrema
- †Bradyospira
- †Bramertonia
- †Bridegeina
- †Bridegeites
- †Brilonella
- †Brocchia
- †Brocchinia
- †Brocchitas
- †Brochidium
- †Brochina
- †Brookesena
- Brookula
- †Brouzetia
- †Bruclarkia
- †Brunonia
- †Bubovicus
- †Bucanella
- †Bucania
- †Bucanoides
- †Bucanopsis
- †Bucanospira
- †Buccinanops
- †Buccinaria
- †Buccinofusus
- †Buccinopsis
- †Buccinorbis
- †Buccinulum
- Buccinum
- †Buccitriton
- †Bucconia
- †Buchozia
- †Buckmanina
- †Buechelia
- †Bufonariella
- †Bulbihastula
- †Bulbus
- †Bulimactaeon
- †Bulimorpha
- Bulla
- Bullata
- †Bullia
- †Bullina
- †Bulliopsis
- †Bullopsis
- †Bulovia
- †Burdikinia
- Bursa
- †Burtinella
- Buscotypus
- Busycon
- †Buvignieria
- †Byramia
- †Byzantia

== C ==
- †Cabania
- †Cabestanna
- Caecum
- †Caesia
- †Calaurops
- †Calcarata
- †Calcitrapessa
- †Calicantharus
- †Caliendrum
- †Callianax
- †Calliobasis
- †Calliomphalus
- Calliostoma
- †Calliotectum
- †Calliotropis
- †Calliovarica
- †Callispira
- †Callistadia
- †Callistele
- †Callistocypraea
- †Callitomaria
- †Callolongchaeus
- †Callopoma
- †Callotrochus
- †Callusaria
- †Calodisculus
- †Calophos
- †Calorebama
- Calotrophon
- †Calpurna
- †Calthalotia
- †Calvadosiella
- †Calverturris
- Calyptraea
- †Calyptraphorus
- †Calyptroides
- †Calyptropsis
- †Camarnia
- †Cambodgia
- †Campanelle
- Campanile
- †Campanilopa
- †Campbellospira
- †Campichia
- †Camponaxis
- †Camponeila
- †Camposcala
- †Camptoceratops
- †Campylacrum
- †Canaliscala
- Canarium (synonym of Strombus (Canarium) )
- †Cancellaria
- †Cancellariella
- †Cancelrana
- †Cancilla
- †Candinia
- †Canepina
- Cantharidella
- Cantharidus
- †Cantharulus
- Cantharus
- †Cantrainea
- †Capulacmaea
- †Capulus
- †Carboninia
- †Cardinalia
- †Careliopsis
- †Caribiella
- †Caricella
- †Carinacca
- Carinaria
- †Carinaropsis
- †Carinator
- †Carinodrillia
- †Carinomphalus
- †Carinotropsis
- †Carota
- †Caseyella
- †Casimiria
- Casmaria
- †Cassianastraea
- †Cassianaxis
- †Cassianebala
- †Cassianilda
- †Cassianocirrus
- †Cassianozyga
- †Cassidaria
- †Cassiope
- †Cassiopella
- †Cassipelia
- Cassis
- †Catantostoma
- †Cataschisma
- †Catazona
- †Catazone
- †Catenoscala
- †Catenotoma
- †Catilon
- †Caucasella
- †Cautotriphora
- †Caveola
- †Cavernisa
- †Cavilabium
- †Caviumbonia
- Cavolina
- †Celatoconus
- Cellana
- †Cenomanella
- †Centrifuga
- †Centrifugus
- †Cepatia
- †Ceratia
- †Ceratopea
- †Ceratostoma
- †Ceraunocochlis
- †Ceritella
- Cerithidea
- †Cerithideops
- †Cerithideopsilla
- †Cerithideopsis
- Cerithidium
- †Cerithiella
- †Cerithina
- †Cerithinella
- †Cerithioclava
- †Cerithiocyga
- †Cerithioderma
- †Cerithioides
- †Cerithiomorpha
- †Cerithiopsida
- †Cerithiopsidella
- Cerithiopsis
- †Cerithiscala
- Cerithium
- †Cerithopsina
- †Chalarostrepsis
- †Charadreum
- Charonia
- †Chartroniella
- †Chasmotheca
- †Chauvetia
- †Chavanicerithium
- †Chedevillia
- Cheilea
- †Cheilospicata
- †Cheilotomona
- †Chelotia
- †Chelyconus
- †Chemnitzia
- †Chepultapecia
- †Chesaclava
- †Chesasyrinx
- †Chesathais
- †Chesatrophon
- †Chevallieria
- Chicoreus
- †Chileutomia
- †Chilocyclus
- †Chilodonta
- †Chilodontoidea
- †Chingua
- †Chippewaella
- †Chiralithes
- †Chiraluta
- †Chlathrus
- Chlorostoma
- †Chlupacispira
- †Chondrocerithium
- †Chorus
- †Christitys
- †Chrysallida
- †Chrysame
- †Chrysostoma
- †Cibecuia
- †Cidarina
- †Cigelirina
- †Cilara
- †Cimoliocentrum
- †Cimolithium
- †Cinclidonema
- †Cinctiscala
- Cingula
- Cingulina
- †Cinguliturris
- †Cinulia
- †Circulopsis
- †Circuloscala
- †Circulus
- †Cirillia
- †Cirrus
- †Cirsocerithium
- †Cirsochilus
- †Cirsomphalus
- Cirsonella
- †Cirsope
- †Cirsostylus
- Cirsotrema
- Cittarium
- †Claibornia
- †Clanculopsis
- Clanculus
- †Clathrobaculus
- Clathrodrillia
- Clathromangelia
- †Clathronema
- †Clathroscala
- †Clathrospira
- †Clathrus
- †Clathurella
- †Clava
- †Clavatula
- †Clavellofusus
- †Clavidrupa
- †Clavilithes
- †Claviscala
- †Clavocerithium
- †Clavstoma
- †Clavus
- †Cleobula
- †Cleotrivia
- †Clifdenia
- †Climacina
- †Climacopoma
- †Clinopegma
- †Clinura
- †Clinurella
- †Clinuropsis
- Clio
- †Clivuloturris
- †Closia
- †Closteriscus
- †Closteroides
- †Cloughtonia
- †Clypeola
- †Clypeolum
- †Clypeomorus
- †Clypidina
- †Coalingodea
- †Coanollonia
- †Coccopigya
- †Cocculina
- †Cocculinella
- †Cochiolepis
- †Cochleochilus
- Cochlespira
- †Cochlespirella
- †Cochlespiropsis
- †Cochliconus
- †Codinella
- †Codonocheilus
- †Coelobolma
- †Coelocaulus
- †Coelocentrus
- †Coelochrysalis
- †Coelocyclus
- †Coelodiscus
- †Coeloscapha
- †Coelostylina
- †Coelotrochus
- †Coelozone
- †Coemansia
- †Colina
- †Collabrina
- †Colliculus
- †Collina
- Collisella
- †Collonia
- †Collonista
- †Colostracon
- †Colpites
- †Colpomphalus
- †Colposigma
- †Colpospira
- †Colpostomia
- Colubraria
- †Colubrella
- †Colubrellina
- Columbarium
- Columbella
- †Columbellaria
- †Columbellina
- †Columbellisipho
- †Columbellopsis
- Colus
- †Coluzea
- †Colwellia
- †Comarmondia
- †Cominella
- †Cominista
- †Cominula
- †Comitas
- †Commonozonispira
- Compsodrillia
- †Compsonema
- †Conactaeon
- Concholepas
- †Conchothyra
- †Concinnispira
- †Confusiscala
- †Conilithes
- †Coninoda
- †Coniscala
- Conjectura
- †Conocerithium
- †Conoidacmaea
- †Conolithes
- †Conominolia
- †Conomitra
- †Conomurex
- †Conorbis
- †Conorhytis
- †Conotoma
- †Conotomaria
- †Consobrinella
- †Contemniscala
- †Contortella
- †Conuber
- Conus
- †Cookia
- †Cophocara
- †Copidocatomus
- †Coptochetus
- †Coptosipho
- †Coptostoma
- †Coptostomella
- †Coraeophos
- †Coralliophila
- †Cordieria
- †Cordispira
- †Coriandria
- †Cornulina
- †Coronatica
- †Coronia
- †Coroniopsis
- †Coroniscala
- †Coronopsis
- †Corsania
- †Cortinella
- †Cosmasyrinx
- †Cosmetalepas
- †Cosmocerithium
- †Cosmolithes
- †Cosmophiline
- †Cossmannea
- †Cossmannia
- †Cossmannica
- †Costaella
- Costellaria
- †Costoanachis
- †Costosyrnola
- †Cotonopsis
- †Cottonia
- †Couthouyia
- †Cowlitzia
- †Craginia
- †Cranopsis
- †Craspedostoma
- †Crassilabrum
- †Crassimarginata
- †Crassimurex
- †Crassiscala
- Crassispira
- †Crassispirella
- †Crassopleura
- †Crawfordina
- †Crebriscala
- †Cremides
- †Crenaturricula
- †Crenetocerithium
- †Crenilabium
- †Crenilunula
- †Crenistriella
- †Crenisutura
- †Creniturbo
- †Crenulazone
- †Creonella
- †Crepidula
- †Crepipatella
- †Creseis
- †Cretaceomurex
- †Cribraria
- †Crimella
- †Crisposcala
- †Cristalloella
- †Crommium
- †Cronia
- †Crossata
- †Crossea
- †Crosseola
- †Crossoceras
- †Crossostoma
- †Crossotrema
- Crucibulum
- †Cruziturricula
- †Cryoturris
- †Cryptaulax
- †Cryptoborsonia
- †Cryptobranchia
- †Cryptochorda
- †Cryptoconus
- †Cryptocordieria
- †Cryptomella
- †Cryptonatica
- †Cryptonerita
- †Cryptoplocus
- †Cryptoptyxis
- †Cryptorhytis
- †Cryptospira
- †Ctenilyria
- †Ctenocolpus
- †Cubestana
- †Culmia
- †Cupaniella
- †Cuphosolenus
- †Cuphotifer
- †Cupidoliva
- †Curetia
- †Cuvierina
- †Cyclites
- †Cyclobathmus
- †Cyclodostomia
- †Cyclomolops
- †Cyclonema
- †Cyclope
- †Cycloscala
- †Cycloscena
- †Cyclospongia
- †Cyclostomaria
- †Cyclostrema
- †Cyclostremela
- Cyclostremiscus
- †Cyclostromella
- †Cyclotheca
- †Cyclothyca
- †Cycloturbo
- †Cyclozyga
- Cylichna
- †Cylichnania
- †Cylichnatys
- Cylichnella
- †Cylichnina
- †Cylichnopsis
- †Cylicioscapha
- †Cylinder
- †Cylindriscala
- †Cylindritella
- †Cylindrites
- †Cylindritopsis
- †Cylindrobullina
- †Cylindromitra
- †Cylindrotruncatum
- †Cyllene
- †Cyllenina
- †Cymakra
- †Cymatiella
- Cymatium
- †Cymatophos
- †Cymatospira
- †Cymatosyrinx
- Cymbiola
- †Cymbium
- †Cymbularia
- †Cymenorhytis
- †Cymia
- †Cynisca
- †Cyniscella
- Cyphoma
- †Cyphonochelus
- Cypraea
- Cypraecassis
- †Cypraedia
- †Cypraeerato
- †Cypraeogemmula
- †Cypraeopsis
- †Cypraeorbis
- †Cypraeotrivia
- †Cyproglobina
- †Cypropterina
- †Cyrbasia
- †Cyrtochetus
- †Cyrtospira
- †Cyrtostropha
- †Cyrtulotibia
- †Cythara
- †Cytharella

== D ==
- †Dactylidella
- †Dactylidia
- †Daidia
- †Dalliella
- †Dallitesta
- †Damesia
- Daphnella
- †Daphnobela
- †Darbya
- †Dardanula
- †Daronia
- †Dasyostoma
- †Decorospira
- †Deianira
- †Delphinulopsis
- †Dembabaspira
- †Demoulia
- †Denayella
- †Dendroconus
- †Dennantia
- †Dentallopoma
- Dentimargo
- †Dentiscala
- †Dentistyla
- †Dentiterebra
- †Dentrimitra
- Depressiscala
- Dermomurex
- †Derstolida
- †Dertonia
- †Desertospira
- †Deshayesia
- †Deslongchampsia
- †Desorinassa
- †Deussenia
- †Devonozyga
- †Diacria
- †Diaerecallus
- Diala
- †Dialopsis
- †Dialytostoma
- †Diameza
- Diaphana
- †Diarthema
- Diastoma
- †Diastomella
- †Diatinostoma
- †Diatrypesis
- †Dibaphimitra
- †Dibaphus
- †Dicellonema
- †Dichostasia
- †Dickinsiella
- †Diconomorpha
- †Dicosmos
- †Dicroloma
- †Dictyobembix
- †Dictyotomaria
- †Didianema
- †Diempterus
- †Dientomochilus
- †Dietrichiella
- †Digitolabrum
- †Dihelice
- †Dilatilabrum
- Diloma
- †Diminovula
- †Dimorphotectus
- †Dinaxis
- Diodora
- †Diplochilus
- †Diploconula
- †Diplocyma
- †Diplomeriza
- †Diplomitra
- †Diplozone
- †Diptychochilus
- †Diptyxiella
- †Dirachis
- †Dircella
- †Dirhachopea
- †Dirocerithium
- †Discobasis
- †Discocirris
- †Discogenus
- †Discogonius
- †Discohelix
- †Discopsis
- †Discordichilus
- †Discoscala
- †Discotectonica
- †Discotectus
- †Discotheca
- †Discotoma
- †Discotomaria
- †Discotropis
- †Disculus
- †Disoketa
- †Dispotaea
- †Dissochilus
- Distorsio
- †Ditretus
- †Dizoniopsis
- †Docomphala
- †Doellocosmia
- Dolabella
- †Dolicholatirus
- †Dolichupis
- †Dolicrassea
- †Doliella
- †Doliocassis
- †Dolomena
- †Dolomitella
- †Dolostoma
- †Domerginella
- †Donaldiella
- †Donaldina
- †Dongiovannia
- †Dorsanum
- †Dorsina
- †Dostia
- †Douvilleia
- †Douvilletoma
- †Doxander
- †Drepanocheilus
- †Drepanoconcho
- Drillia
- †Drilliola
- †Drilluta
- †Druidwilsonia
- Drupa
- †Dumasella
- †Dunkeria
- Duplicaria
- †Dutrochus
- †Dyeria

== E ==
- Eatoniella
- †Ebala
- †Eburna
- †Eburnopsis
- †Eccliseogyra
- †Ecculiomphalus
- †Eccyliopterus
- †Echinellopsis
- †Echinimathilda
- †Echininus
- †Echinobathra
- †Echinocirrus
- †Echinofulgur
- †Echinophoria
- †Echinoturris
- †Ecphora
- †Ecphorosycon
- †Ectinochilus
- †Ectomaria
- †Edithais
- †Egerea
- †Egestas
- †Egilina
- †Eglisia
- †Egotistica
- †Ehlersina
- †Eichwaldiella
- †Eirlysia
- †Eiselia
- Elachorbis
- †Elaeocyma
- †Elasmonema
- †Elatioriella
- †Eleganella
- †Elegantiscala
- Elephantanellum
- †Eleutherospira
- †Eligmoloxus
- †Ellatrivia
- †Ellicea
- †Ellipsoscapha
- †Elliptovermetus
- †Ellisella
- †Elysiacea
- Emarginula
- †Emarginulina
- †Emersonia
- †Enaeta
- †Enantiostoma
- †Enatimene
- †Enclyclomphalus
- †Endianaulax
- †Endiaplocus
- †Endiataenia
- †Endiatoma
- †Endiatrachelus
- †Endopachychilus
- †Endoptygma
- Engina
- Engoniophos
- †Enida
- †Entacanthus
- Entemnotrochus
- †Entomella
- †Entomope
- †Eoacteon
- †Eoatlanta
- †Eobucania
- †Eocalliostoma
- †Eocerithium
- †Eocernina
- †Eocithara
- †Eoclathurella
- †Eocymatium
- †Eocypraea
- †Eocythara
- †Eodrilla
- †Eoharpa
- †Eoliotina
- †Eomathilda
- †Eopleurotoma
- †Eoptychia
- †Eoranella
- †Eosinica
- †Eosipho
- †Eosiphonalia
- †Eosolariella
- †Eosolarium
- †Eosurcula
- †Eothesbia
- †Eotomaria
- †Eotrivia
- †Eotrochactaeon
- †Eotrochus
- †Eoturris
- †Eotympanotonus
- †Eovasum
- †Eovolutilithes
- †Eovolva
- †Eoxancus
- †Epalxis
- †Epetrium
- †Epheria
- †Epideira
- †Epidirella
- †Epidirona
- †Epifaxis
- †Epiptychia
- †Episcynia
- Epitonium
- †Epulotrochus
- Erato
- Eratoidea
- †Eratopsis
- †Eratotrivia
- †Erginus
- †Ericusa
- †Eripachya
- †Eriptycha
- Erosaria
- †Erronea
- †Erymarella
- †Escoffieria
- †Estea
- †Ethalia
- †Etrema
- †Etremopsis
- †Euactaeonina
- †Eubela
- †Eucheilodon
- Euchelus
- †Euchilotheca
- †Euchrysalis
- †Euclathurella
- †Euclia
- †Eucochlis
- †Eucominia
- †Euconactaeon
- †Euconia
- †Euconospira
- †Eucycloidea
- †Eucyclomphalus
- †Eucycloscala
- †Eucyclus
- †Eucymba
- †Eucypraedia
- Eudolium
- †Eugabrielona
- Eulima
- Eulimastoma
- †Eulimella
- †Eulimene
- †Eumetadrillia
- †Eumetula
- †Eumitra
- †Eunaticina
- †Eunema
- †Eunemopsis
- †Euninella
- †Euomphalopsis
- †Euomphalopterus
- †Euomphalus
- Euparthenia
- †Euphemitella
- †Euphemites
- †Euphemitopsis
- †Euphyllon
- Eupleura
- †Euplica
- †Euprotomus
- †Euriclanculus
- †Eurissolina
- †Euryalox
- †Eurydike
- †Euryentmema
- †Euryentome
- †Euryochetus
- †Eurypyrene
- †Eurytorus
- †Euryzone
- †Euscobinella
- †Euseila
- Euspira
- †Euspirocrommium
- †Eustoma
- †Eustomia
- †Eustrombus
- †Euthria
- †Euthriofusus
- †Euthymella
- †Euthyrachis
- †Euthystylus
- †Eutinochilus
- †Euzone
- †Evalea
- †Evarnula
- †Evelynella
- †Ewekoroia
- †Ewekorolaxis
- †Exechestoma
- †Exechocirsus
- †Exilia
- †Exilifusus
- †Exiloidea
- †Exlessia
- †Exomiliopsis
- †Extendilabrum
- †Eymarella

== F ==
- †Fadaiella
- †Faloriella
- †Falsicolus
- †Falsifusus
- †Falsostyliola
- †Falsostyliola
- †Faluniella
- Fartulum
- Fasciolaria
- †Fascioplex
- †Fascivelvata
- †Fastigiella
- Fautor
- Favartia
- †Favria
- †Favriella
- †Fax
- †Faxxia
- †Feneoniana
- †Fenestrosyrinx
- †Fenolignum
- †Fibula
- †Fibulella
- †Fibuloptygmatis
- †Fibuloptyxis
- †Ficopsis
- †Fictoacteon
- †Fictonoba
- †Ficulomorpha
- †Ficulopsis
- Ficus
- †Filodrilla
- †Fimbriatella
- †Finlayola
- †Fischeriella
- Fissurella
- †Fissurellidea
- †Fissurisepta
- †Flacilla
- †Flemmingia
- †Fletcherviewia
- †Flexopteron
- †Floribella
- †Floripatella
- †Floyda
- †Folina
- †Foratiscala
- Forreria
- †Forsia
- †Forskaelena
- †Fossacypraea
- †Fossariopsis
- Fossarius
- †Fossatrivia
- †Fredenia
- †Friginatica
- †Frombachia
- †Fujispira
- †Fulgerca
- Fulgoraria
- †Fulguroficus
- †Fulgurofusus
- †Funis
- Funiscala
- †Fuscibuccinum
- †Fuscoscala
- †Fusiaphera
- †Fusiguraleus
- †Fusimilis
- †Fusimitra
- Fusinus
- †Fusiptyxis
- †Fusispira
- †Fusitoma
- Fusitriton
- †Fusitron
- †Fusiturricula
- †Fusiturris
- †Fusoficula
- †Fusoidella
- †Fusoterebra
- †Fusus
- †Futhystylus
- †Fyfea

== G ==
- †Gabrielona
- †Galeodaria
- †Galeodea
- †Galeodina
- †Galeodinopsis
- †Galeoocorys
- †Galericulus
- †Galeropsis
- †Gamizyga
- †Gammadiscus
- †Gamopleura
- †Ganesa
- †Gargania
- †Garnotia
- †Garramites
- †Gasconadia
- †Gazameda
- †Gegania
- †Gelagna
- †Gelasinostoma
- †Gemaspira
- †Gemmaterebra
- †Gemmellaroia
- †Gemmoliva
- †Gemmula
- †Gemmuloborsonia
- †Genkaimurex
- †Genota
- †Geolcomia
- †Georgia
- †Gergovia
- Gibberula
- †Gibberulina
- †Gibberulus
- Gibbula
- †Gigantocapulus
- †Gigantocypraea
- †Gigantogonia
- †Gilbertina
- †Gilbertturricula
- †Ginebis
- †Girtyspira
- †Girvania
- †Gisortia
- †Gispyrella
- †Glabella
- †Glabrocingulum
- †Glaphyrina
- †Glauconia
- †Glauconiella
- †Globiconcha
- †Globiomorpha
- †Globisinum
- †Globodrillia
- †Globonema
- †Globozygia
- †Globularia
- †Globulocerithium
- †Glosia
- †Glossaulax
- †Glyphodeta
- †Glyphostoma
- †Glyphoturris
- †Glyptochrysalis
- †Glyptomaria
- †Glyptospira
- †Glyptostyla
- †Glyptotoma
- †Glyptozaria
- †Gomphopages
- †Goniasma
- †Goniatogyra
- †Goniocheila
- †Gonioconcha
- †Goniocylichna
- †Goniocylindrites
- †Goniodostomia
- †Goniogyra
- †Gonioptyxis
- †Goniospira
- †Gonysycon
- †Gonzagia
- †Gosavia
- †Gosseletina
- †Gothicispira
- †Gouetina
- †Gougerotia
- †Gourmya
- †Graciliala
- †Gracilipurpura
- †Gracilispira
- †Gradiella
- †Grandostoma
- †Granosolarium
- †Grantlandispira
- †Granula
- Granulina
- †Granulittorina
- †Granulolabium
- †Graphidula
- †Graphiocomassa
- †Graphis
- †Gregorioiscala
- †Groomodiscus
- †Guelphinacella
- †Guidonia
- †Guildfordia
- †Guizhouia
- †Guizospira
- †Gumina
- †Guraleus
- †Gutturnium
- †Gymnarus
- †Gymnentome
- †Gymnocerithium
- †Gyrineum
- †Gyrodes
- †Gyrodoma
- †Gyroma
- †Gyronema
- Gyroscala
- †Gyrospira
- †Gyrotropis

== H ==
- †Hacobjania
- †Hadriania
- †Hahazimania
- †Halia
- †Haliotiomorpha
- Haliotis
- †Haliphoebus
- Halistylus
- †Halloysia
- †Hallstadtia
- †Haloginella
- Haminoea
- †Hamlinia
- †Hammatospira
- †Hamptoniella
- †Hamusina
- †Hanaibursa
- †Hanaispira
- †Hanetia
- †Hapalorbis
- †Haplocochlias
- †Haploptyxis
- †Haplospira
- †Haplovoluta
- †Harfordia
- †Harmatia
- †Harmeria
- Harpa
- Harpago
- †Harpagodes
- †Harpella
- †Harpula
- †Harrisianella
- †Hartungia
- Hastula
- †Haurakia
- †Haustator
- Haustellum
- †Hautura
- †Hayamiella
- †Haydenia
- †Hebeseila
- †Hebra
- †Heida
- †Heilprinia
- Helcion
- Heliacus
- †Helicacanthus
- †Helicaulax
- †Helicocryptus
- †Helicospira
- †Helicotoma
- †Heligmope
- †Heligmostylus
- †Heligmotenia
- †Heligmotoma
- †Helminthozyga
- †Hemiacirsa
- †Hemicerithium
- †Hemichenopus
- †Hemiconus
- †Hemifusus
- †Hemipleurotoma
- †Hemiplicatula
- †Hemisurcula
- Hemitoma
- †Hemizyga
- †Heniastoma
- †Hennocquia
- †Hercorhynchus
- †Hermania
- †Herminespina
- Herpetopoma
- Hespererato
- †Hesperiella
- †Hesperiturris
- †Hesperocirrus
- †Heterocerithiopsis
- †Heterocithara
- †Heterogyrella
- †Heteronodosus
- †Heteroptygmatis
- †Heterospira
- †Heterotrema
- †Hexachorda
- †Hexaglauconia
- Hexaplex
- †Hilda
- †Hillites
- †Hima
- †Himantonia
- †Hinia
- †Hippocampoides
- †Hippochrene
- Hipponix
- †Hiromurex
- †Hirotyphis
- †Hirsonella
- †Hirtoscala
- †Hispanosinuites
- †Hispidofusus
- †Hiwia
- †Hologyra
- †Holopea
- †Holzapfelia
- Homalopoma
- †Hopkinsiana
- †Hordeulima
- †Horiostomella
- †Horizostoma
- †Hormotoma
- †Hormotomina
- †Horologium
- †Houdasia
- †Houzeauia
- †Hudlestonella
- †Humiliworthenia
- †Hungariella
- †Hwaania
- †Hyala
- Hyalina
- †Hyalocylis
- †Hyalorisia
- †Hyaloscala
- †Hybochelus
- †Hydrotribulus
- †Hyperacanthus
- †Hypergonia
- †Hyphantozyga
- †Hypocassis
- †Hypodema
- †Hypselentoma
- †Hypsipleura
- †Hypterita
- †Hystricoceras
- †Hystrivasum

== I ==
- †Ianthinopsis
- †Iddingsia
- †Idioraphe
- †Ihungia
- †Ilanga
- †Iljinella
- Illyanassa
- †Imbricaria
- †Incilaster
- †Incisilabium
- †Indocerithium
- †Indovoluta
- †Infracoronia
- †Infundibulops
- †Inglisella
- †Inquisitor
- †Insolentia
- †Involuta
- †Iolaea
- †Iothia
- †Iphiana
- †Iravadia
- Iredalina
- Iredalula
- †Isanda
- †Ischnoptygma
- Iselica
- †Isfarispira
- †Ishnula
- †Islipia
- †Isonema
- †Isospira
- †Ispharina
- †Isselia
- †Italoptygmatis
- †Ithycythara
- †Itia
- †Itieria
- †Itomelania
- †Itruvia
- †Ivara
- †Ividella

== J ==
- †Jaccardiella
- †Janacus
- †Janiopsis
- Janthina
- †Japelion
- †Jaton
- †Jedria
- †Jeffreysina
- Jenneria
- †Jetwoodsia
- †Jogjacartanus
- †Johannaia
- †Johnstrupia
- †Josepha
- †Jousseemea
- Jujubinus
- Julia
- †Jumala
- †Junghuhnia
- †Jurassiphorus

== K ==
- †Kaawatina
- †Kahua
- †Kaiparapelta
- †Kaitangata
- †Kaitoa
- †Kangapaya
- †Kangilioptera
- †Kangxianospira
- †Kapua
- †Katoptychia
- †Katosira
- †Kaunhowenia
- †Kaurnella
- †Kawanamia
- †Kaweka
- †Keeneia
- †Keepingia
- †Keilostoma
- Kelletia
- †Keration
- †Kestocenbra
- †Khetella
- †Khumerspira
- †Kiaeromphalus
- †Kimina
- †Kinishbia
- †Kinkaidia
- †Kishinewia
- †Kittlia
- †Kittliconcha
- †Kittlidiscus
- †Kittlistylus
- †Kittlitrochus
- †Kiviasukkaan
- †Kjerulfonema
- †Kleinacteon
- Knefastia
- †Knightella
- †Knightites
- †Kodymites
- †Kokenella
- †Kokenospira
- †Koniakaua
- †Korovinia
- †Kotakaia
- †Krachia
- †Krebsia
- †Kuroshioturris
- Kurtziella
- †Kyndalyna

== L ==
- †Labiostrombus
- †Labridens
- †Labrocuspis
- †Laccinum
- †Lachryma
- †Lacinia
- †Lacriforma
- Lacuna
- †Lacunaria
- †Lacunella
- †Lacunina
- †Lacunospira
- †Lacurnaria
- †Ladinotrochus
- †Ladinula
- †Laetifautor
- †Laevella
- †Laevibaculus
- †Laevibuccinum
- †Laeviconulus
- †Laevihastula
- †Laevinerinea
- †Laeviselica
- †Laevistrombus
- †Laeviterebrum
- †Laevitomaria
- †Laevityphis
- †Lagunitus
- †Laiocochlis
- Lambis
- Lamellaria
- †Lamelliphorus
- †Lamellospira
- †Lampanella
- †Lampasopsis
- †Lamprodoma
- †Lamprodomina
- †Lampusia
- †Lancedellia
- †Lapparia
- †Lathyrulus
- †Latiala
- Latiaxis
- †Latifusus
- †Latirolagena
- Latirus
- †Latisipho
- †Latitaenia
- †Laubella
- †Lautoconus
- †Laxispira
- †Leaella
- †Lecanospira
- †Leiopyrga
- †Leiorhinus
- †Leiostraca
- †Leiotrochus
- †Lemintina
- †Lemniscolittorina
- †Lenitrophon
- †Lenticularis
- †Lentigo
- Lepeta
- †Lepetella
- †Lepetopsis
- †Lepicythara
- †Lepidotrochus
- †Leporemax
- †Leporicypraea
- Lepsiella
- †Lepsithais
- †Leptadrillia
- †Leptegauana
- †Leptocolpus
- †Leptoconus
- †Leptomaria
- †Leptomphalus
- †Leptomurex
- †Leptoptygma
- †Leptorima
- †Leptoscapha
- †Leptosurcula
- †Leptothyra
- †Leptothyropsis
- †Leptozone
- †Leptozyga
- †Lesperonia
- †Lesueurilla
- †Leucorhynchia
- Leucosyrinx
- Leucozonia
- †Leufroyia
- †Levella
- †Levenia
- †Leviathania
- †Levifusus
- †Lewinskia
- †Lewisiella
- †Liaohenia
- †Libycerithium
- †Lienardia
- †Ligatella
- †Lilax
- †Liljevallospira
- Liloa
- Limacina
- †Limneria
- Limulatys
- †Linatella
- †Linemera
- †Linglingella
- †Liniaxis
- †Linopyrga
- †Linsleyella
- †Liocarenus
- †Liocerithium
- †Liochlamys
- †Liocium
- †Lioglyphostoma
- †Liomesus
- †Liopeplum
- †Liospira
- †Liotella
- Liotia
- †Liotina
- †Lippistes
- †Liracassis
- †Liracraea
- †Lirastrombina
- †Lirasyrinx
- †Liratilia
- †Liratomina
- †Lirobittium
- †Lirocingula
- †Lirofusus
- †Lironoba
- †Lirosoma
- †Lirularia
- †Lisbonia
- †Lischkeia
- †Lispodesthes
- †Lissapiopsis
- †Lissochilus
- †Lissomuricopsis
- †Lissospira
- Lissotesta
- Lissotestella
- †Lithoconus
- †Lithophysema
- Lithopoma
- †Lithotrochus
- Litiopa
- Littoraria
- Littorina
- †Littorinides
- †Littorinolacuna
- †Littorinopsis
- †Littorniscala
- Livonia
- †Lodanaria
- Lodderena
- †Lodderia
- †Lomia
- †Lomirosa
- †Longchaeus
- †Longicerithium
- †Longoconcha
- †Longstaffia
- †Lophioturris
- †Lophocochlias
- †Lophonema
- †Lophospira
- Lottia
- †Lowenstamia
- †Loxisonia
- †Loxobidens
- †Loxonema
- †Loxoplocus
- †Loxoptyxis
- †Loxotaphrus
- Lucapina
- Lucapinella
- †Lucerapex
- †Lucidestea
- †Luciella
- †Luciellina
- Lunatia
- Lunatica
- †Lunella
- †Lunulazona
- †Lupira
- †Luponovula
- †Luria
- †Lutema
- †Lutima
- †Lydiphnis
- †Lyncina
- †Lyosoma
- †Lyria
- †Lyrianella
- †Lyrischapa
- †Lyromangelia
- †Lyropurpura
- †Lyrosurcula
- †Lyrotyphis
- †Lysiogyrus
- †Lysis
- †Lytospira

== M ==
- †Macilentos
- †Maclurina
- †Macluritella
- †Maclurites
- Macrocypraea
- †Macrodostomia
- †Macromphalus
- Macron
- †Macroniscus
- †Macrosinus
- †Macrozafra
- †Macrurella
- †Madiella
- Magilus
- †Magnatica
- †Magnicapulus
- †Makiyamaia
- †Malayaspira
- Malea
- †Malluvium
- †Mambrinia
- †Mamiconus
- †Mammilla
- †Manawatawhia
- †Mancorus
- †Mandolina
- Mangelia
- †Mangiliella
- †Manzanospira
- †Manzonia
- Maoricolpus
- †Maoricrypta
- †Maoriscaphander
- †Maoritomella
- †Maorivetia
- †Marbodeia
- Marevalvata
- Margarella
- †Margaritella
- Margarites
- Marginella
- †Margineulima
- †Mariacassia
- †Mariacolpus
- †Mariadrillia
- †Mariafusus
- †Marianarona
- †Mariasalpinx
- †Mariasveltia
- †Mariaturricula
- †Marinauris
- †Mariothia
- †Mariottia
- †Marmarostoma
- †Marmolatella
- †Marshallaria
- †Marshallena
- †Marsupina
- †Marticia
- †Marwickara
- †Massyla
- †Mastigospira
- †Mataxa
- Mathilda
- †Mathurifusus
- †Maudrillia
- †Mauithoe
- †Maurea
- †Mauria
- †Mauritia
- †Mauryna
- †Maussenetia
- Maxwellia
- †Mayeria
- †Mazzalina
- †Meandrella
- †Mecoliotia
- †Mediargo
- †Medionapus
- †Medoriopsis
- †Meekospira
- †Megalatractus
- †Megalocypraea
- †Megalomphala
- †Megalomphalus
- †Megalonoda
- †Megastomia
- †Megasurcula
- †Megatebennus
- Megathura
- †Megistostoma
- Meioceras
- †Melagraphia
- Melanatria
- Melanella
- †Melanioptyxis
- †Melapium
- †Melaraphe
- †Melatoma
- †Mellarium
- †Mellevillia
- Melongena
- †Menestho
- †Mennessieria
- †Menthafonia
- †Merelina
- †Merica
- †Mericella
- †Merriamites
- †Mesalia
- †Mesochilotoma
- †Mesocoelia
- †Mesogena
- †Mesoglauconia
- †Mesohalina
- †Mesoneritina
- †Mesorhytis
- †Mesospira
- †Mesotrochactaeon
- †Mesovalvata
- †Metacerithium
- †Metaconulus
- †Metamelon
- Metaxia
- †Metoptoma
- †Metorthonema
- †Metriomphalus
- †Metula
- †Metulella
- †Mexicotrochaetaeon
- †Micantapex
- †Michaletia
- †Michela
- †Michelia
- †Micheliopsis
- †Micraclathurella
- †Micranellium
- Micrelenchus
- †Micrentoma
- †Micreschara
- †Microcheilus
- †Microdoma
- †Microdrillia
- †Microfulgur
- †Microfusus
- †Microgaza
- †Microlacuna
- †Microliotia
- †Micromphalina
- †Micromphalus
- †Microptychis
- †Microrhytis
- †Microschiza
- †Microstelma
- †Microsurcula
- †Microtaphrus
- †Microthyca
- †Microvoluta
- †Mikadotrochus
- †Milda
- †Millepes
- †Millosevichia
- †Minolia
- †Minutiscala
- †Mioawateria
- †Miocenebra
- †Miofractarmilla
- †Miolyncina
- †Miomelon
- †Miopila
- †Miopleiona
- †Mirachelus
- †Miraclathurella
- †Miralda
- †Mirascapha
- †Mirlolaminatus
- †Mirochiliticus
- †Mirua
- †Mirula
- †Misteia
- †Mistostigma
- Mitra
- †Mitraria
- †Mitratoma
- Mitrella
- †Mitrelloturris
- †Mitreola
- †Mitridomus
- †Mitrithara
- †Mitrodrillia
- †Mitrolumna
- Mitromorpha
- †Mnestia
- †Mnestocylichnella
- †Modelia
- †Modestospira
- Modulus
- †Moelleria
- †Moerckeia
- †Molopophorus
- †Monalaria
- †Monetaria
- †Monilea
- †Moniliopsis
- †Moniliriretusa
- †Monocirsus
- †Monocuphus
- †Monodentella
- †Monodilepas
- Monodonta
- †Monoplex
- †Monopophorus
- †Monoptygma
- †Montfortia
- †Montfortula
- †Montia
- †Montospira
- †Morania
- †Morchiella
- †Morea
- †Morgania
- †Morionella
- †Mormula
- †Morphotropis
- Morula
- Morum
- †Morunella
- †Motyris
- †Mourlonia
- †Mourlonopsis
- †Mrhilaia
- †Muconalia
- †Multifarites
- †Multiptyxis
- Munditia
- †Munditiella
- †Murchisonella
- †Murchisonia (Gastropod)
- †Muregina
- Murex
- Murexiella
- †Murexsul
- Muricanthus
- †Muricassis
- Muricopsis
- †Muricotrochus
- †Murotriton
- †Murphitys
- †Musashia
- †Myagrostoma
- †Myobarbum
- †Myristica
- †Myurella
- †Myurellina

== N ==
- †Nacca
- Nacella
- †Nairiella
- †Nanggulania
- †Nannamoria
- †Nannodiella
- †Nannopyrgula
- †Nannubasa
- †Napulus
- †Naquetia
- †Naricava
- †Naricopsina
- †Narona
- †Nassa
- †Nassaria
- †Nassarina
- Nassarius
- †Nassicola
- †Natella
- †Natica
- †Naticarius
- †Naticonema
- †Naticopsis
- †Natiria
- †Natitaria
- †Nawenia
- †Neamphitomaria
- †Nebularia
- †Neilsonia
- †Nekewis
- †Nematrochus
- †Nemrac
- †Neoathleta
- †Neobernaya
- †Neocola
- †Neocylindrites
- †Neocylindrus
- †Neoguraleus
- †Neoimbricaria
- †Neojanacus
- †Neolatirus
- †Neonerinea
- †Neoplatytaichum
- †Neopleurofusia
- †Neoptyxis
- †Neosimnia
- †Neotrochaetaeon
- †Neozeba
- †Nepotilla
- †Neptunea
- †Nereina
- †Neridomus
- †Nerinatica
- †Nerinea
- †Nerinella
- †Nerineopsis
- †Nerineoptyxis
- †Nerinoides
- †Nerita
- †Neritaria
- Neritina
- †Neritoma
- †Neritoplica
- †Neritopsis
- †Neritoptyx
- †Neritrema
- †Nevadaspira
- †Neverita
- †Nicema
- †Nicolia
- †Nicosiaella
- †Nigerapana
- †Nigerithium
- †Nihonia
- †Nina
- †Ninella
- †Niotha
- †Nipponitys
- †Nipteraxis
- †Nisaclis
- †Nisiturris
- †Niso
- †Nisostomia
- †Nitidella
- †Nitidiscala
- †Niveria
- †Nodilittorina
- Nodiscala
- †Nodisurculina
- †Noditerebra
- †Nododelphinula
- †Nodonema
- †Nodospira
- †Nodulus
- †Noetca
- †Nonacteonina
- †Nordospira
- †Norrisella
- †Norrisia
- †Northia
- †Notacirsa
- †Notadusta
- Notoacmea
- Notocrater
- †Notocypraea
- †Notocytharella
- †Notogenota
- †Notohaliotis
- †Notoluponia
- †Notomella
- †Notopeplum
- †Notoplejona
- †Notoscrobs
- †Notoseila
- †Notosetia
- †Notosinister
- †Nototrivia
- †Notovoluta
- †Nozeba
- Nucella
- †Nuclearia
- †Nucleopsis
- †Nudangarita
- †Nudivagus
- †Nummocalcar
- †Nummotectus

== O ==
- †Oamaruia
- †Obex
- †Obexomia
- †Obornella
- Obtortio
- †Obtusella
- Ocenebra
- †Ochetochilus
- †Ochetoclava
- †Ocinebrellus
- †Ocinebrina
- †Odetta
- †Odoardia
- †Odontobasis
- †Odontofusus
- †Odontomaria
- †Odontopolys
- †Odontopurpura
- †Odontoturbo
- †Odostomella
- Odostomia
- †Odostomidea
- †Oehlertia
- Oenopota
- †Offleya
- †Offlyeotrochus
- †Ogivia
- †Okinawavoluta
- †Olequahia
- †Oligoptycha
- †Oligoptyxis
- Oliva
- †Olivancillaria
- Olivella
- †Olivia
- †Olivula
- †Olssonella
- †Omalaxis
- Omalogyra
- †Omanimaria
- †Omogymna
- †Omospira
- †Omphalius
- †Omphalonema
- †Omphaloptycha
- †Omphalotrochus
- Omphalotropis
- †Oncochilus
- †Ongleya
- †Oniscidia
- †Onkospira
- †Onoba
- Oocorys
- †Ooliticia
- †Oonia
- †Oostrombus
- †Ootomaria
- †Ootomella
- Opalia
- †Opaliopsis
- †Opella
- †Ophileta
- †Ophiletina
- Ophiodermella
- †Opimilda
- †Opisthonema
- †Optoturris
- Orbitestella
- †Orecopia
- †Orectospira
- †Orinella
- †Ormastralium
- †Ornamentaria
- †Ornatoptygmatis
- †Ornatospira
- †Ornopsis
- †Orospira
- †Orthaulax
- †Orthochetus
- †Orthochilus
- †Orthonema
- †Orthonychia
- †Orthoptyxis
- †Orthostomia
- †Orthosurcula
- †Osilinus
- †Ossiania
- †Ostioma
- †Otatara
- †Otollonia
- †Otomphalus
- †Otopleura
- †Otostoma
- †Ottoino
- Otukaia
- †Ovactaeonina
- †Ovatipsa
- †Ovilia
- †Ovinotis
- †Ovirissoa
- †Ovulactaeon
- †Ovulopsis
- †Owenella
- †Oxyacrum
- †Oxycypraea
- †Oxygyrus
- †Oxymeris
- †Oxyspira
- †Oxystele
- †Ozarkina
- †Ozarkispira
- †Ozodochilus

== P ==
- †Pachycrommium
- †Pachycymbiola
- †Pachycythara
- †Pachydontella
- Pachymelon
- †Pachyomphalus
- †Pachyrissoina
- †Pachystrophia
- †Pachysyrnola
- †Pagodea
- †Pagodina
- †Pagodospira
- †Pagodula
- †Pakistania
- †Paladmete
- †Palaeatractus
- †Palaeocancellaria
- †Palaeocollonia
- †Palaeocypraea
- †Palaeohydatina
- †Palaeoloxotoma
- †Palaeonarica
- †Palaeonisco
- †Palaeopsephaea
- †Palaeorhaphis
- †Palaeoschisma
- †Palaeoscurria
- †Palaeostylus
- †Palaeotrochactaeon
- †Palaeotrochus
- †Palaeozygopleura
- †Palangaria
- †Paleoalvania
- †Paleofusimitra
- †Paleunema
- †Paleuphemites
- †Pallacera
- †Palliocypraea
- †Palliseria
- †Palmadusta
- †Palomelon
- †Panamurex
- †Pangoa
- †Panormella
- †Papillina
- †Paraborsonia
- †Paracerithium
- †Paracirculus
- †Paraclathurella
- †Paracomitas
- †Paracomminia
- †Paradrilla
- †Parafusus
- †Paraglauconia
- †Paragoniozona
- †Paraliospira
- †Paramarshallena
- Parametaria
- †Paramorea
- †Paranassa
- †Paraneistrolepis
- †Parangarenga
- †Parangularia
- †Paraplatyschisma
- †Parapuractaeon
- †Pararaphispira
- †Paraseraphs
- †Parasimplotyxis
- †Parasyngenochilus
- †Parasyrinx
- †Parataphrus
- †Paraterebra
- †Paratrophon
- †Paraturbo
- †Paraviviana
- †Parazebinella
- †Pareora
- †Pareuchelus
- †Pareuryalox
- †Parietiplicatum
- †Parinotus
- †Paronaella
- †Parthenina
- †Partubiola
- †Partulida
- †Parvacmea
- †Parvimitra
- †Parvirota
- †Parviscala
- †Parvisetia
- †Parvisipho
- †Parviviana
- †Parvivoluta
- †Pasitheola
- Patella
- †Patellastra
- †Patellilabia
- Patelloida
- †Patellopsis
- †Patellostium
- †Patuxentrophon
- †Paulonaria
- †Pavora
- †Paxula
- †Payradeautia
- †Paziella
- †Pchelincevella
- †Peasiella
- †Pectinodonta
- †Peculator
- †Pedasiola
- Pedicularia
- Pedipes
- †Peelerophon
- †Pegocomptus
- †Pelicaria
- †Pellasimnia
- †Pellax
- †Penion
- †Pentagonodiscus
- †Pentaptyxis
- †Peonza
- †Pepta
- †Peracle
- †Pereiraea
- †Periaulax
- †Pericarinata
- †Peridipsaccus
- †Peringiella
- †Perissitys
- †Perissodonta
- †Perissolax
- †Perissoptera
- †Peristernia
- †Peritrophon
- †Pernericirrus
- †Perneritrochus
- †Perotrochus
- †Perplicaria
- †Perrinia
- †Perrona
- †Perse
- Persicula
- †Personella
- †Personopsis
- †Perucerithium
- †Peruchilus
- †Peruficus
- †Perulithes
- †Peruluta
- †Peruniscus
- †Perustrombus
- †Peruviella
- †Peruvispira
- †Pervicacia
- Petaloconchus
- †Petersia
- †Petrafixia
- †Petropoma
- †Peyrotia
- †Pezantia
- Phalium
- †Phandella
- †Phanerolepida
- †Phaneroptyxis
- †Phanerotinus
- †Phanerotrema
- †Pharetrolites
- †Pharkidonotus
- Phasianella
- †Phasianema
- †Phasianochilus
- †Phasianotrochus
- †Phenacovolva
- Phenatoma
- Philine
- †Philippia
- †Philoxene
- †Pholidotoma
- †Phoracanthus
- †Phorculus
- †Phorcus
- Phos
- †Phosinella
- †Phragmolites
- †Phragmosphaera
- †Phrontis
- †Phryx
- †Phyllocheilus
- †Phyllonotus
- †Phymatopleura
- †Pictavia
- †Pictiformes
- †Pictoscala
- †Piestochilus
- †Pietteia
- †Pileolus
- †Pinquigemmula
- †Pirena
- †Pirenella
- †Pirgos
- †Pirper
- †Pirsila
- †Pisanella
- Pisania
- †Pisanianura
- †Pisinna
- †Pisulina
- †Pithodea
- †Pittella
- †Plagiothyra
- Planaxis
- †Planicollonia
- †Planitrochus
- †Planolateralus
- †Planospirina
- †Planotectus
- †Planozone
- †Planpyrgiscus
- †Platyacra
- †Platybassis
- †Platyceras
- †Platychilina
- †Platyconcha
- †Platyconus
- †Platycythara
- Platyla
- †Platyloron
- †Platyoptera
- †Platyschisma
- †Platyteichum
- †Platyworthenia
- †Platyzona
- †Plectocion
- †Plectonotoides
- †Plectonotus
- †Pleia
- †Pleioptygma
- †Plentaria
- †Plesioacirsa
- †Plesiocerithium
- †Plesioptygmatis
- †Plesiothyreus
- †Plesiotriton
- †Plesiotrochus
- †Plethospira
- †Pleuracme
- †Pleuratella
- †Pleurofusia
- †Pleurolimnaea
- †Pleuroliria
- †Pleuromphalus
- †Pleuronotus
- Pleuroploca
- †Pleuropyramis
- †Pleurorima
- Pleurotomaria
- †Pleurotomella
- †Pleurotomoides
- †Plicafoliosa
- †Plicarcularia
- †Plicifusus
- †Pliciscala
- †Plicobulla
- †Pliconacca
- †Plocezyga
- †Plochelaea
- †Ploconema
- †Plocostoma
- †Plocostylus
- †Plotophysops
- Poirieria
- †Poleumita
- †Polinella
- Polinices
- †Poliniciella
- Pollia
- †Polygyreulima
- †Polygyrina
- †Polystira
- †Polytremaria
- †Pomahakia
- Pomaulax
- †Ponderia
- †Ponocyclus
- †Popenella
- †Popenoeum
- †Porcellia
- †Pornosis
- †Poropteron
- †Portlockiella
- †Portoricia
- †Postalia
- †Potamides
- †Potamidopsis
- †Powellisetia
- †Praehyalocylis
- †Praelittorina
- †Praematuratropis
- †Praenatica
- †Praestomatia
- †Preangeria
- †Prestrombus
- †Priene
- Primovula
- †Prionovolva
- †Priotrochus
- †Priscaphander
- †Priscoficus
- †Priscofusus
- †Prisogaster
- †Pristimerica
- †Pristinacca
- †Proacirsa
- †Proadusta
- †Procalpurnus
- †Procampanile
- †Procancellaria
- †Procerapex
- †Procerithiopsis
- †Procerithium
- †Proclava
- †Procominula
- †Proconulus
- †Prodiozoptyxis
- †Proficus
- †Profundialvania
- †Progabbia
- †Promartynia
- †Promathilda
- †Promourlonia
- †Propemurchisonia
- Propilidium
- †Propustularia
- †Proscala
- †Proscutum
- †Prosimnia
- †Prosipho
- †Prosolarium
- †Prosoptychus
- †Prosthenodon
- †Proterato
- †Protoatlanta
- †Protobarleeia
- †Protobusycon
- †Protocalyptaea
- †Protocypraea
- †Protocypraedia
- †Protodolium
- †Protofusus
- †Protoma
- †Protonema
- †Protopirula
- †Protorcula
- †Protorotella
- †Protospirialis
- †Protostylifera
- †Protostylus
- †Protosurcula
- †Prototurbo
- †Prototyphis
- †Protuba
- †Proturboella
- †Proturritella
- †Provermicularia
- †Proxicharonia
- †Proximitra
- †Proxiuber
- Prunum
- †Psammodulus
- †Psephaea
- †Pseudalaria
- †Pseudamaura
- †Pseudaulicina
- †Pseudavena
- †Pseudoaclisina
- †Pseudoaluco
- †Pseudoaptyxis
- †Pseudobaylea
- †Pseudobrochidium
- †Pseudobuccinum
- †Pseudocancilla
- †Pseudocassis
- †Pseudochrysalis
- †Pseudocirsope
- †Pseudoclanculus
- †Pseudocominella
- †Pseudocryptaenia
- †Pseudocymia
- †Pseudodiartema
- †Pseudodiloma
- †Pseudofax
- †Pseudofissurella
- †Pseudofulgur
- †Pseudofusia
- †Pseudogaleodea
- †Pseudoglauconia
- †Pseudohercynella
- †Pseudolacuna
- †Pseudolatirus
- †Pseudoliomesus
- †Pseudoliotina
- †Pseudoliva
- †Pseudolyria
- †Pseudomalaxis
- †Pseudomelania
- †Pseudomelatoma
- †Pseudomesalia
- †Pseudometula
- †Pseudomorea
- †Pseudompalotrochus
- †Pseudomurchisonia
- †Pseudoneptunea
- †Pseudonerinea
- †Pseudonina
- †Pseudoninella
- †Pseudoperissitys
- †Pseudoperissolax
- †Pseudophasianus
- †Pseudophorus
- †Pseudopisania
- †Pseudoplatyceras
- †Pseudoplocezyga
- †Pseudorapa
- †Pseudoraphitoma
- †Pseudorhytidopilus
- †Pseudorotella
- †Pseudoscalites
- †Pseudoscalites
- †Pseudoschizogonium
- †Pseudosetia
- †Pseudostomatella
- †Pseudotaphrus
- †Pseudotectus
- †Pseudotoma
- †Pseudotorinia
- †Pseudotritonium
- †Pseudotrivia
- †Pseudotruncatella
- †Pseudotubina
- †Pseudotylostoma
- †Pseudovaricia
- †Pseudovertagus
- †Pseudowarthia
- †Pseudozonaria
- †Pseudozygopleura
- †Psilarius
- †Psilaxis
- †Psilocochlis
- †Ptereulima
- †Pterocera
- †Pterocerella
- †Pterocheilos
- †Pterochelus
- †Pterodonta
- †Pterodonticeras
- †Pterolabrella
- Pteropurpura
- †Pterorytis
- †Pterospira
- †Pterotheca
- Pterotrachea
- Pterotyphis
- †Pterygia
- Pterynotus
- †Ptomatis
- †Ptychatractus
- †Ptycheulimella
- †Ptychobellerophon
- †Ptychocaulus
- †Ptychocerithium
- †Ptychocylindrites
- †Ptychogyra
- †Ptychomphalina
- †Ptychomphalus
- †Ptychopotamides
- †Ptychoris
- †Ptychosalpinx
- †Ptychosphaera
- †Ptychospirina
- †Ptychostoma
- †Ptychosyca
- †Ptychosyrinx
- †Ptychozone
- †Ptygmatis
- Pugilina
- †Pugnellus
- †Puha
- †Pulchrastele
- †Pulchritima
- Punctiscala
- †Punctospira
- Puncturella
- †Puncturellopsis
- †Punjabia
- †Pupa
- †Pupatonia
- Puperita
- †Pupillaea
- †Pupillaria
- †Puposyrnola
- Purpura
- †Purpuradusta
- †Purpurellus
- †Purpurina
- †Purpuroidea
- †Puruiana
- †Puruninella
- Pusia
- †Pusillina
- †Pusiolina
- †Pusionella
- Pustularia
- †Pustulifer
- Pusulla
- †Putilla
- †Putzeysia
- †Pycnomphalus
- †Pycnotrochus
- †Pyktes
- Pyramidella
- †Pyramidelloides
- †Pyramimitra
- †Pyramistomia
- †Pyramitoma
- †Pyrazella
- †Pyrazisinus
- †Pyrazus
- Pyrene
- †Pyrenomitra
- †Pyrenoturris
- †Pyrgiscilla
- Pyrgiscus
- Pyrgocythara
- †Pyrgolampros
- †Pyrgolidium
- †Pyrgotrochus
- †Pyrgulina
- †Pyrifusus
- †Pyropsis
- †Pyruclia
- †Pyrulofusus
- †Pyrunculus
- †Pythmenema
- †Pyxipoma

== Q ==
- †Quadricarina
- †Quadrinervus
- †Quassisipho
- †Quimalea
- †Quoyia

== R ==
- †Rabicea
- †Radinista
- †Raha
- †Raincourtia
- †Ramina
- Ranella
- †Ranellina
- †Rangimata
- †Ranularia
- Rapana
- †Raphischisma
- †Raphispira
- †Raphistoma
- †Raphistomina
- †Raphitoma
- †Rapopsis
- †Ratifusus
- †Raulinia
- †Ravitrona
- †Ravnostomia
- †Rectiplanes
- †Recurvina
- †Redocla
- †Remera
- †Remnita
- Renea
- †Reticulacella
- †Reticuloturris
- †Retiopustula
- †Retipirula
- †Retispira
- †Retizafra
- Retusa
- †Reymentella
- †Rhabdocolpus
- †Rhabdoconcha
- †Rhabdotocochlis
- †Rhaphischisma
- †Rhaphistomella
- Rhinoclavus
- †Rhinoderma
- †Rhizorus
- †Rhombella
- †Rhomboidestoma
- †Rhombopsis
- †Rhombostoma
- †Rhopalites
- †Rhynchocerithium
- †Rhynchocypraea
- †Rhytidopilus
- †Ricinella
- Rictaxis
- †Rigauxia
- †Rimella
- †Rimosodaphnella
- Rimula
- †Rimulopsis
- †Rinaldoconchus
- †Rinaldomphalus
- Ringicula
- †Ringiculella
- †Ringiculina
- †Ringiculocosta
- †Ringiculopsis
- †Ringiculoptycha
- †Ringiculospongia
- †Ringinella
- †Ripleyella
- †Risella
- †Risellopsis
- †Risselloidea
- Rissoa
- †Rissocerithium
- Rissoina
- †Rissolina
- †Rissomangelia
- †Rissopsetia
- †Ritena
- †Riuguhdrillia
- †Robus
- †Rochia
- †Rolandomphalus
- †Rollandiana
- Roperia
- †Rossiteria
- †Rostellaca
- †Rostellana
- †Rostellaria
- †Rostellinda
- †Rostreulima
- †Rostrocerithium
- †Rotadiscoides
- †Rothpeltzia
- †Rothpletzella
- †Rousseauspira
- †Roxania
- †Roxaniella
- Roya
- †Ruedemannia
- †Rufilla
- †Rugatiscala
- †Rugiferia
- †Rugobela
- †Rugotyphis
- †Rugulina
- †Rumerloella

== S ==
- †Sabatia
- †Sabaziella
- †Sabia
- †Sabinella
- †Sablea
- †Sabrinella
- †Saccaroturris
- †Saccoina
- †Sagenella
- †Sallya
- †Salpingostoma
- †Salterospira
- †Sandbergeria
- †Sanhaliotis
- †Santia
- †Sargana
- †Sarmates
- †Sarmaticus
- †Sarmaturbo
- †Sassia
- †Scabrella
- †Scabricola
- †Scaevola
- †Scalaetrochus
- Scalaria
- †Scalaronoba
- †Scalaspira
- †Scalenostoma
- †Scalina
- †Scaliola
- †Scalites
- †Scalitina
- †Scalituba
- †Scalptia
- Scaphander
- Scaphella
- †Scaphellopsis
- †Sceptrum
- †Schilderia
- †Schizobasis
- †Schizogonium
- †Schizolopha
- †Schizopea
- Schwartziella
- Scissurella
- Scissurona
- †Scobinella
- †Scobinodola
- †Scoliostoma
- Sconsia
- †Scorbinidola
- †Scrinium
- †Scrobs
- †Scrupus
- †Sculpturea
- †Scurriopsis
- †Scutellastra
- Scutus
- †Searlesia
- †Sediliopsis
- †Seelya
- †Seguenzia
- Seila
- †Seisa
- †Sellinema
- †Semahana
- †Semiactaeon
- †Semibittium
- Semicassis
- †Semicypraea
- †Semineritina
- †Seminola
- †Semipirum
- †Semisolarium
- †Semistylifer
- †Semiterebellum
- †Semitriton
- †Semitrivia
- †Semitubina
- †Semityphis
- †Semivertagus
- †Semperia
- †Sentularia
- Septa
- †Sequania
- †Seraphs
- †Serpentubina
- Serpulorbis
- †Serpulospira
- †Serrata
- †Serratifusus
- †Serratocerithium
- †Serratotrochus
- †Serrifusus
- †Settsassia
- †Sevanella
- †Seymourosphaera
- †Shansiella
- †Shikamacirrus
- †Shikokuspira
- †Shwedagonia
- Sigapatella
- †Sigaretopsis
- †Sigaretotrema
- Sigatica
- †Sigmesalia
- Siliquaria
- †Siluracmaea
- †Siluriphorus
- Simnia
- †Sinaxila
- †Sincola
- Sinezona
- †Singulitubus
- †Sinistrella
- †Sinistrospira
- †Sinorificium
- †Sinospira
- †Sinuella
- †Sinuina
- †Sinuites
- †Sinuitina
- Sinum
- †Sinuopea
- †Sinuozyga
- †Sinuspira
- †Sinustomia
- †Sinutropis
- †Sinzowia
- †Sipho
- †Siphocypraea
- †Siphonacmea
- Siphonalia
- Siphonaria
- †Siphonochelus
- †Siphonophyla
- †Siphonorbis
- †Siphopatella
- †Siratus
- †Sirius
- †Sisenna
- †Siskyouspira
- †Skaptotion
- †Skena
- Smaragdia
- †Smithiellia
- †Socotora
- †Sogdianella
- †Sohlella
- †Sohlia
- †Sohlitella
- †Solariaxis
- Solariella
- †Solarioconulus
- †Solariorbis
- †Solarium
- †Solatia
- †Soleniscus
- †Solenosteira
- †Sollariaxis
- †Solutofusus
- †Sorapisella
- †Sororcula
- †Sosiolytes
- †Spanionema
- †Sparella
- Spectamen
- Specula
- †Speightia
- †Spelaenacca
- †Sphaerocina
- †Sphaerocypraea
- †Sphaeronassa
- †Sphenosphaera
- †Spinaspira
- †Spineoterebra
- †Spinicharybdis
- †Spinigera
- †Spiniscala
- †Spinomelon
- †Spinulrichospira
- †Spiractaeon
- †Spiraculinella
- †Spiradaphne
- †Spiralta
- †Spirgvaleia
- †Spirina
- †Spirochrysalis
- †Spirocirrus
- †Spirocolpus
- †Spirocrypta
- †Spirocyclina
- †Spirocyclus
- †Spirodentalium
- †Spiroecus
- †Spirogalerus
- †Spiroglyphus
- Spirolaxis
- †Spiromphalus
- †Spironema
- †Spironemella
- †Spiroscala
- †Spirostylus
- †Spirotomaria
- †Spirotropis
- Splendrillia
- †Spoelia
- †Squamalinia
- †Squarrosus
- †Stachella
- †Staffinia
- †Stantonella
- †Staphylaea
- †Stazzania
- †Stegocoelia
- Stellaria
- †Stellaxis
- †Stelzneria
- †Stenoloron
- Stenorhytis
- †Stenotis
- †Stenozone
- †Stephanoconus
- †Stephanocosmia
- †Stephanosalpinx
- †Stephanozyga
- †Stereokion
- †Steromphala
- Sthenorytis
- Stigmaulax
- Stilifer
- †Stilla
- †Stiracolpus
- Stomatella
- †Stomatia
- †Stosicia
- Stramonita
- †Strangulites
- †Straparella
- †Straparollina
- †Straparollus
- †Strebloceras
- †Strephona
- †Strephonella
- †Strepsidura
- †Streptacis
- †Streptocarina
- †Streptochetus
- †Streptodictyon
- †Streptodiscus
- †Streptolathyrus
- †Streptopelma
- †Streptotrochus
- †Striactaeonina
- †Striatesta
- †Striaticostatum
- †Striatiscala
- †Strictohumerus
- †Strigatella
- †Strigillibuccinum
- †Strigosella
- †Striocarinata
- †Striodostomia
- †Strioterebrum
- †Strioturbonilla
- †Strobeus
- †Strombiformis
- Strombina
- †Strombinella
- †Strombinophos
- †Stromboconus
- †Strombolaria
- †Strombopugnellus
- Strombus
- †Strominella
- †Strongylocera
- †Strophostylus
- †Strotostoma
- †Struthiochenopus
- †Struthiolarella
- Struthiolaria
- †Struthiolariopsis
- †Struthioptera
- †Stuorella
- †Sturgeonospira
- †Stylidium
- †Styliola
- †Stylonema
- †Styloplocus
- †Suavodrillia
- †Subcancilla
- †Subclimax
- †Subditotectarius
- †Subninella
- †Subpterynotus
- †Subula
- †Subuliscala
- †Subulites
- †Suchium
- †Suessonia
- †Sulcoactaeon
- †Sulcocypraea
- †Sulcogladius
- †Sulconatica
- †Sulcoretusa
- †Sulcorinella
- †Sulcosipho
- †Sulcosubularia
- †Sulcotrivia
- †Sulcoturbonilla
- †Sulculus
- †Sundabittium
- †Superstes
- Supplanaxis
- †Suprazonalis
- †Surcula
- †Surculina
- †Surculites
- †Surculoma
- †Sveltella
- †Sveltia
- †Swainsonia
- †Sycodes
- †Sycopsis
- †Sycostoma
- †Sycotypus
- †Sydaphera
- †Sylvestrosphaera
- †Symmetrocapulus
- Synaptocochlea
- †Syncera
- †Syngenochelus
- †Syntomodrillia
- †Syrnola

== T ==
- †Tachyrhynchella
- †Tachyrhynchus
- †Taemasotrochus
- †Taeniaturbo
- †Taeniospira
- †Tahudrilla
- †Tahusyrinx
- †Taieria
- †Taioma
- †Taita
- †Takia
- †Talahabia
- †Talantodiscus
- †Talityphis
- Talopena
- †Talostolida
- Talparia
- †Tanaliopsis
- †Tanea
- †Taniella
- †Tanimasanoria
- †Tantunia
- †Taosia
- †Taphrostomia
- †Tapinotomaria
- †Taramellia
- †Taranis
- †Tarantinaea
- †Taron
- †Tatara
- †Tateiwaia
- †Taurasia
- †Tauricella
- †Tauschia
- †Taxonia
- †Tectaplica
- †Tectariopsis
- Tectarius
- †Tectifusus
- Tectonatica
- †Tectospira
- Tectura
- †Tectus
- Tegula
- †Teiichispira
- †Teilostoma
- Teinostoma
- †Teinostomopsis
- †Tejonia
- †Telasco
- †Teleochilus
- †Teleoptyxis
- Telescopium
- †Teliochilus
- †Telleria
- †Temanella
- †Tembrockia
- †Temnodiscus
- †Temnospira
- †Temnotropis
- Tenagodus
- Tenaturris
- †Teneposita
- †Tenuiactaeon
- †Tenuicerithium
- †Tenuiscala
- †Tephlon
- †Terebellopsis
- Terebellum
- Terebra
- Terebralia
- †Terebraliopsis
- †Terebrellina
- †Terebrifusus
- †Terebritoma
- †Terefundus
- †Terelimella
- †Teremelon
- †Teretia
- †Teretrina
- †Ternivoluta
- †Tessarolax
- Testudinalia
- †Tetranota
- †Tetraplica
- †Tetraptyxis
- †Tetratubispira
- Thais
- †Thaisella
- †Thala
- †Thalotia
- †Thanetinassa
- †Tharsiella
- Thatcheria
- †Thecopsella
- †Thelecythara
- †Theliostyla
- †Thericium
- †Thersitea
- †Thesbia
- †Thiarinella
- †Thierachella
- †Tholitoma
- †Thorista
- Thoristella
- †Threavia
- †Thylacus
- †Tianjinospira
- †Tiara
- †Tiaracerithium
- †Tiarellacerithium
- †Tiberia
- †Tibersyrnola
- †Tibia
- †Tibiaporrhais
- †Tibiella
- †Tiburnus
- †Timisia
- †Tintorium
- †Tioria
- †Tipua
- †Tmetonema
- †Toledonia
- †Tomellana
- †Tomopleura
- †Tomostoma
- †Tomyris
- Tonna
- †Torcula
- †Torculoidella
- †Torgnellus
- †Torinia
- †Tornatellaea
- Tornus
- †Torquatiscala
- †Torquesia
- †Torquesiella
- †Torquifer
- †Tortisipho
- †Tortoliva
- †Tournouerella
- †Touzinia
- †Toxoconcha
- †Trachelochetus
- †Trachoecus
- †Trachybembix
- †Trachydomia
- †Trachynerita
- Trachypollia
- †Trachysma
- †Trachyspira
- †Trachytriton
- †Tractoliria
- †Tragula
- †Trajana
- †Trajanella
- †Transmariaturris
- †Transovula
- †Transylvanella
- †Tremanotus
- †Trepospira
- †Tretospira
- †Triadoskenea
- †Trianglospira
- †Triangularia
- †Triaracerithium
- †Triassocirrus
- †Tribia
- †Trichosirius
- Trichotropis
- Tricolia
- †Tricornis
- †Tridactylus
- †Triforis
- †Trigonostoma
- †Trimalaxis
- Trimusculus
- Triphora
- †Tripia
- †Tripidotomaria
- †Triploca
- †Tripterotyphis
- Triptychus
- †Tristichotrochus
- †Tritiaria
- Tritonalia
- †Tritonatractus
- †Tritonomangilia
- †Tritonophon
- †Tritonopsis
- †Trituba
- †Triumphis
- Trivia
- †Triviella
- †Trivirostra
- †Trobus
- †Trochacanthus
- †Trochactaeon
- †Trochactaeonina
- †Trochalia
- †Trochita
- †Trochocerithium
- †Trochodon
- †Trochomphalus
- †Trochonema
- †Trochonemella
- †Trochonemopsis
- †Trochonerita
- †Trochopsidea
- †Trochotectus
- †Trochotoma
- †Trochotomaria
- †Trochotrochus
- †Trochotugurium
- †Trochoturbella
- Trochus
- †Trominina
- Trona
- †Troostella
- †Tropaeas
- Trophon
- †Trophonopsis
- †Trophosycon
- †Tropicolpus
- †Tropidodiscus
- Tropidophora
- †Tropidostropha
- †Tropisurcula
- †Trubosta
- †Truncaria
- †Trunculariopsis
- †Tryonella
- †Trypanaxis
- †Trypanocochlea
- †Trypanostylus
- †Trypanotoma
- †Trypanotopsis
- †Trypanotrochus
- †Tubena
- †Tuberleviathana
- †Tubicauda
- †Tubina
- †Tubiola
- †Tubomphalus
- †Tudicla
- †Tudiclana
- †Tudicula
- †Tudorella
- †Tugali
- †Tugurium
- †Tulochilus
- †Tumidiacirsa
- Tumulus (subfamily of Gibbula)
- †Tundora
- †Turbinea
- Turbinella
- †Turbinilopsis
- †Turbinopsis
- Turbo
- †Turbocheilus
- †Turboella
- †Turboidea
- †Turbonellina
- Turbonilla
- †Turbonitella
- †Turbonomaria
- †Turbonopsis
- Turcica
- †Turehua
- †Turriclavis
- †Turricolumbus
- †Turricula
- †Turriculina
- †Turrifulger
- †Turrina
- †Turrinosyrinx
- †Turriola
- Turris
- †Turriscala
- Turritella
- †Turritellopsis
- †Turritoma
- †Turritriton
- †Tychobrachea
- †Tychonia
- †Tylocassis
- Tylochilus
- †Tylodinella
- †Tylospira
- †Tylostoma
- †Tylotrochus
- †Tylozone
- †Tympanotonos
- †Typhina
- †Typhinellus
- Typhis
- †Typhlomangelia
- †Tyrannoberingius
- †Tyrsoecus

== U ==
- †Uberella
- †Uchauxia
- †Ulfa
- †Ulrichospira
- †Umbilia
- †Umbonellina
- Umbonium
- †Umbospira
- †Umbotrochus
- †Umbotropis
- Umbraculum
- †Umpquaia
- †Undiscala
- †Undulabucania
- †Undularia
- †Unedogemmula
- †Unicarinata
- Unitas
- †Upella
- †Urceolabrum
- †Urgonella
- †Urkutitoma
- †Uromitra
- Urosalpinx
- †Uttleya
- †Uvanilla
- †Uxia
- †Uzita

== V ==
- †Vaderos
- †Vaginella
- †Valanginella
- †Valfinia
- Vanikoro
- †Vanikoropsis
- †Vanitrochus
- †Vanpalmer
- †Varicobela
- †Varicosipho
- †Varicospira
- †Varpalmeria
- Vasum
- †Vaughanites
- †Veatchia
- †Velainella
- †Velatella
- †Velates
- Velutina
- †Ventricaria
- †Ventrilia
- †Vergnesia
- Vermetus
- Vermicularia
- †Vernedia
- †Vernelia
- †Verruturris
- †Vesanula
- †Vestulia
- †Veterator
- †Vetridrillia
- †Vexillitra
- Vexillum
- †Vexinia
- †Vexithara
- †Vicarya
- †Vicaryella
- †Vicetia
- †Vicinocerithium
- †Vigescentis
- †Vincenturris
- †Virgella
- †Viridibuccinum
- †Viriola
- †Visitator
- †Vistulia
- Vitrinella
- †Vitrinellops
- †Vitta
- †Vitularia
- †Vivanella
- †Volema
- Voluspa (subspecies of Pyramidella)
- Voluta
- †Volutilithes
- †Volutoconus
- †Volutocorbis
- †Volutoderma
- †Volutolithes
- Volutomitra
- †Volutomorpha
- †Volutopsius
- †Volutospina
- Volva
- †Volvaria
- †Volvariella
- Volvarina
- †Volvarinella
- †Volvocylindrites
- Volvulella
- †Voorwindia
- †Vorticina
- †Vouastia

== W ==
- †Waihaoia
- †Waikura
- †Waimatea
- †Waipaoa
- †Waisiolia
- †Waitara
- †Walnichollsia
- †Waluia
- †Wangacteon
- †Wangaloa
- †Warthia
- †Wateletia
- †Watsonia (subgenus of Parastrophia)
- †Weeksia
- †Wellergyi
- †Wendella
- †Westerna
- †Wexfordia
- †Whitecliffia
- †Whitneya
- †Whitneyella
- Williamia
- †Willungia
- †Wilsoniconcha
- †Wisonsinella
- †Woehrmannia
- †Woodsalia
- †Woodsella
- †Worthenia
- †Wortheniella
- †Wortheniopsis
- †Wyatella

== X ==
- Xancus
- †Xanthochorus
- †Xenogalea
- †Xenophalium
- Xenophora
- Xenotrophon
- †Xenuroturris
- †Xestosurcula
- †Xizangospira
- †Xuwenospira
- †Xymene
- †Xymenella
- †Xystrella

== Y ==
- †Yasila
- †Yingicus
- †Yochelsonospira
- †Yunnania

== Z ==
- †Zaclys
- Zafra
- †Zalipais
- †Zalozone
- †Zanassarina
- †Zaphon
- †Zardinistylus
- †Zardubinihelix
- Zaria (subgenus of Turritella)
- Zeacolpus
- †Zeacrypta
- †Zeacumanthus
- †Zeacuminia
- †Zeadmete
- †Zeapollia
- Zebina
- †Zebittium
- †Zefallacia
- †Zegalerus
- †Zeidora
- †Zekilla
- †Zelandiella
- †Zemacies
- †Zemira
- †Zemitrella
- †Zenbinostoma
- †Zenepos
- †-Zephos (synonym of Cominella)
- †Zeradina
- †Zethalia
- †Zeuxis
- †Zikkuratia
- †Zinolia
- †Zinsitys
- †Zircia
- †Zittelia
- †Ziziphinus
- †Zoila
- Zonaria
- †Zonarina
- †Zosterospira
- †Zygites
- †Zygopleura
