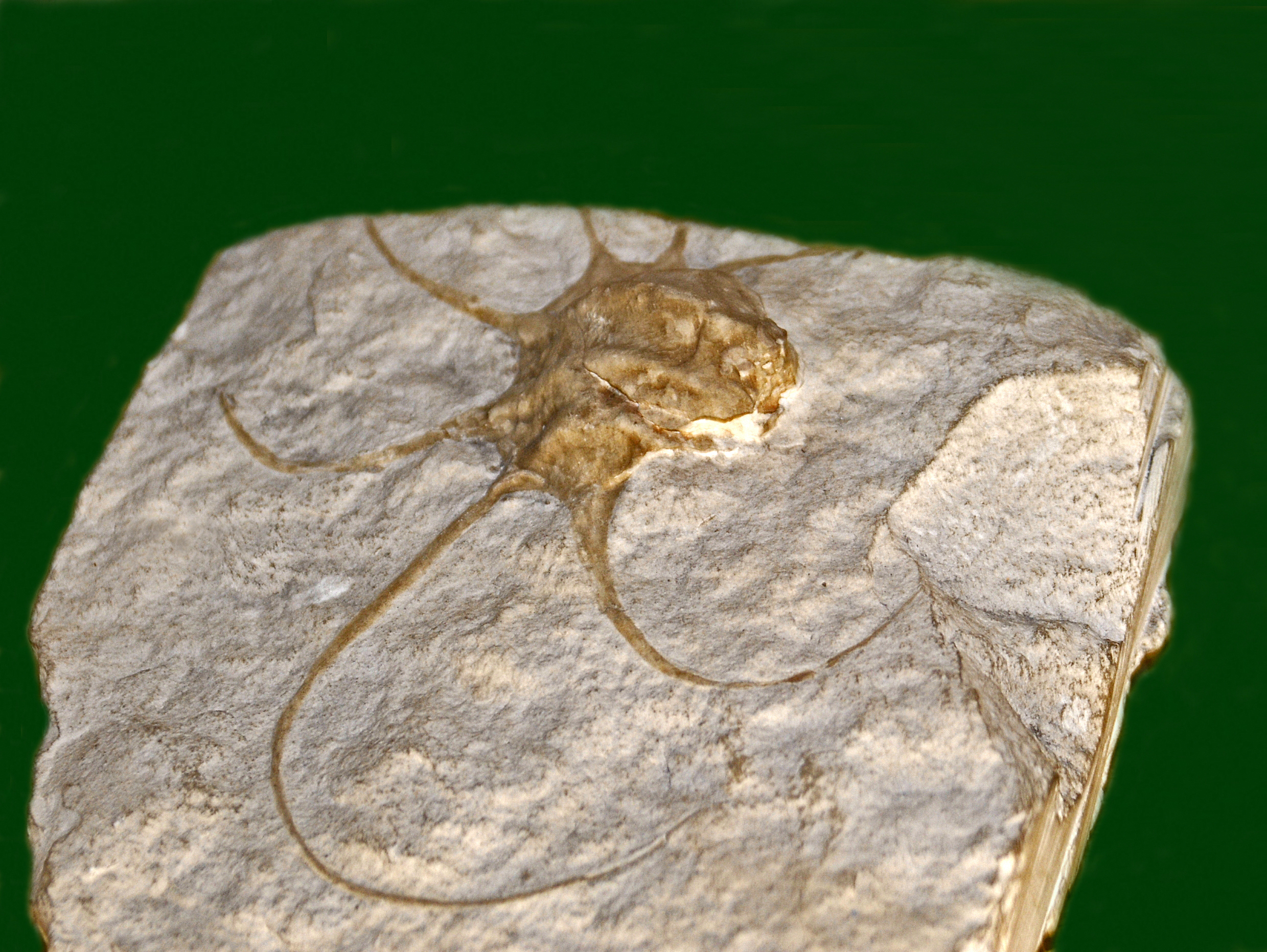
- Fossil shell of Harpagodes aranea (Creuë), Meuse, France, on display at Galerie de paléontologie et d'anatomie comparée, Paris

Scientific classification
- Kingdom: Animalia
- Phylum: Mollusca
- Class: Gastropoda
- Subclass: Caenogastropoda
- Family: †Harpagodidae
- Genus: †Harpagodes
- Species: †H. aranea

Binomial name
- †Harpagodes aranea (d’Orbigny, 1850)

= Harpagodes aranea =

Harpagodes aranea Temporal range: from Jurassic to Cretaceous

Extinct species of gastropod

Harpagodes aranea is an extinct species of fossil sea snail, a marine gastropod mollusc in the family Harpagodidae. This species is found in deposits ranging from the Jurassic to the Cretaceous.
