= Tornus =

Tornus may refer to:

- Tornus (insect anatomy), an entomology term for the posterior corner of the wing
- Tornus (gastropod), a gastropod genus in the family Tornidae
