= Oamaruia deleta =

Scientific classification
- Kingdom: Animalia
- Phylum: Mollusca
- Class: Gastropoda
- Subclass: Caenogastropoda
- Order: Neogastropoda
- Family: Cancellariidae
- Genus: Oamaruia
- Species: O. deleta

Binomial name
- Oamaruia deleta Finlay, 1930

Species of gastropod

Oamaruia deleta is a species of sea snail, a marine gastropod mollusk in the family Cancellariidae, the nutmeg snails.
