= Uttleya arcana =

Scientific classification
- Kingdom: Animalia
- Phylum: Mollusca
- Class: Gastropoda
- Subclass: Caenogastropoda
- Order: Neogastropoda
- Family: Muricidae
- Genus: Uttleya
- Species: U. arcana

Binomial name
- Uttleya arcana Marwick, 1934

Species of gastropod

Uttleya arcana is a species of sea snail, a marine gastropod mollusk in the family Muricidae, the murex snails or rock snails.
