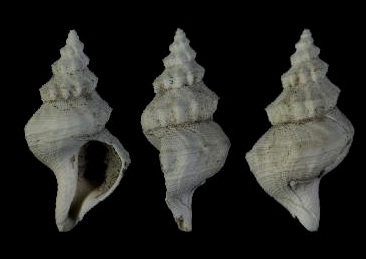
- Shell of † Favriella weberi (specimen at MNHN, Paris)

Scientific classification
- Kingdom: Animalia
- Phylum: Mollusca
- Class: Gastropoda
- Subclass: Caenogastropoda
- Order: Neogastropoda
- Superfamily: Conoidea
- Family: Raphitomidae
- Genus: †Favriella
- Species: †F. weberi

Binomial name
- †Favriella weberi A. Hornung, 1920

= Favriella weberi =

Species of sea snail

Favriella weberi is an extinct species of sea snail, a marine gastropod mollusk in the family Raphitomidae.

== Distribution ==
Fossils of this marine species were found in Pliocene strata of the Alpes-Maritimes, France
