= Calliomphalus =

Calliomphalus Temporal range: 168.3–33.9 Ma

Scientific classification
- Kingdom: Animalia
- Phylum: Mollusca
- Class: Gastropoda
- Subclass: Vetigastropoda
- Family: Eucyclidae
- Genus: †Calliomphalus; Cossmann 1888

Subgenera and species
- Subgenera: †Calliomphalus (Calliomphalus); †Calliomphalus (Planolateralus); Species: †Calliomphalus angustus (Sohl 1960); †Calliomphalus bicarinatus Abbass 1967; †Calliomphalus conanti (Sohl 1960); †Calliomphalus decoris (Sohl 1960); †Calliomphalus elegans Beizel 1983; †Calliomphalus galalaensis Abbass 1967; †Calliomphalus microcancelli Stephenson 1941

Extinct genus of gastropods

Calliomphalus is an extinct genus of sea snails in the family Calliotropidae.

== See also ==
- List of marine gastropod genera in the fossil record
