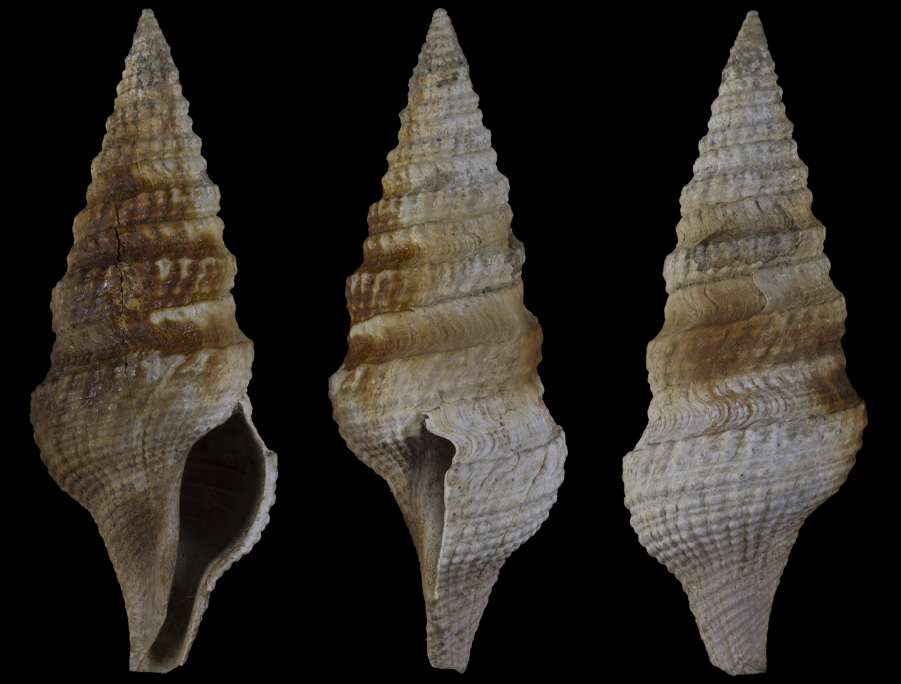
- Shell of † Trachelochelus desmius (specimen at MNHN, Paris)

Scientific classification
- Kingdom: Animalia
- Phylum: Mollusca
- Class: Gastropoda
- Subclass: Caenogastropoda
- Order: Neogastropoda
- Superfamily: Conoidea
- Family: Clavatulidae
- Genus: †Trachelochetus
- Species: †T. desmius

Binomial name
- †Trachelochetus desmius (Edwards, 1857)

Synonyms
- † Clavatula (Trachelochetus) desmia (Edwards, 1857)

= Trachelochetus desmius =

Species of gastropod

Trachelochetus desmius is an extinct species of sea snails, a marine gastropod mollusc in the family Clavatulidae.

== Distribution ==
Fossils of this marine species were found in Eocene strata in Hampshire, Great Britain
