= Gyrodoma =

Scientific classification
- Kingdom: Plantae
- Clade: Tracheophytes
- Clade: Angiosperms
- Clade: Eudicots
- Clade: Asterids
- Order: Asterales
- Family: Asteraceae
- Subfamily: Asteroideae
- Tribe: Astereae
- Subtribe: Grangeinae
- Genus: Gyrodoma; Wild
- Species: G. hispida

Binomial name
- Gyrodoma hispida (Vatke) Wild

Synonyms
- Matricaria hispida Vatke; Brachyscome hispida (Vatke) Klatt; Bellis mossambicensis Klatt; Brachyscome mossambicensis Oliv. & Hiern

Genus of flowering plants

Gyrodoma is a genus of African flowering plants in the family Asteraceae.

Species

There is only one known species, Gyrodoma hispida, endemic to Mozambique.
