= Oamaruia =

Scientific classification
- Kingdom: Animalia
- Phylum: Mollusca
- Class: Gastropoda
- Subclass: Caenogastropoda
- Order: Neogastropoda
- Family: Cancellariidae
- Genus: Oamaruia; Finlay, 1924

Genus of gastropods

Oamaruia is a genus of sea snails, marine gastropod mollusks in the family Cancellariidae, the nutmeg snails.

== Species ==
Species within the genus Oamaruia include:

- Oamaruia deleta Finlay, 1930
