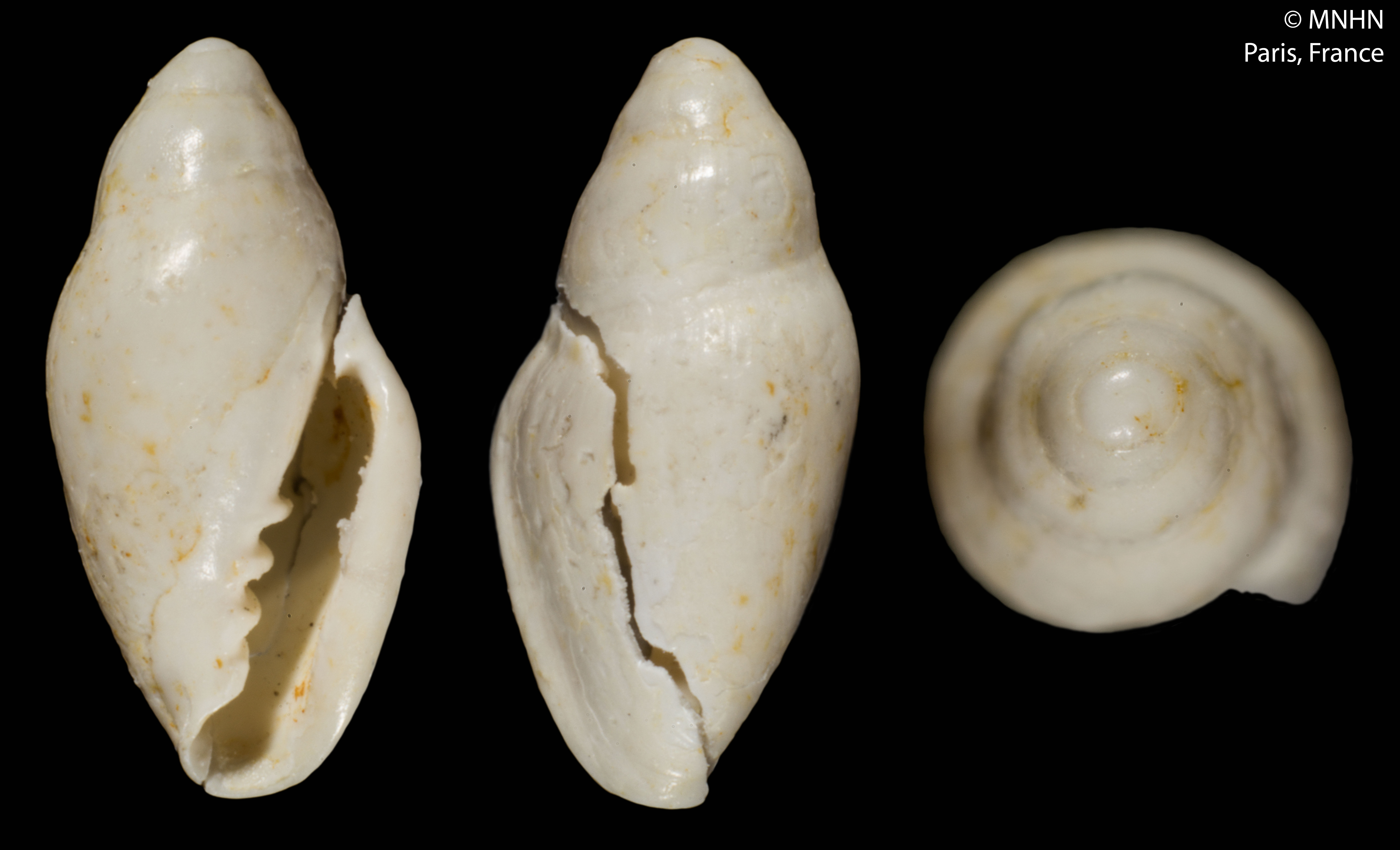
- Shell of † Stazzania morelletorum (syntype at MNHN, Paris)

Scientific classification
- Kingdom: Animalia
- Phylum: Mollusca
- Class: Gastropoda
- Subclass: Caenogastropoda
- Order: Neogastropoda
- Superfamily: Volutoidea
- Family: Marginellidae
- Genus: †Stazzania; Sacco, 1890

Type species
- † Marginella marginata Michelotti, 1847

Synonyms
- Marginella (Stazzania) Sacco, 1890 (original rank)

= Stazzania =

Genus of gastropods

Stazzania is an extinct genus of sea snails, marine gastropod mollusks in the family Marginellidae, the margin snails.

== Species ==
Species within the genus Stazzania include:

- † Stazzania acutapex Le Renard & van Nieulande, 1985
- † Stazzania biconica Le Renard & van Nieulande, 1985
- † Stazzania canaliculata Le Renard & van Nieulande, 1985
- † Stazzania crassissima Le Renard & van Nieulande, 1985
- † Stazzania cryptoptycta Le Renard & van Nieulande, 1985
- † Stazzania entomella (Cossmann, 1889)
- † Stazzania fragilis (Deshayes, 1865)
- † Stazzania fresvillensis Le Renard & van Nieulande, 1985
- † Stazzania fuscosuturata Le Renard & van Nieulande, 1985
- † Stazzania incisa Le Renard & van Nieulande, 1985
- † Stazzania lataperta Le Renard & van Nieulande, 1985
- † Stazzania marginata (Michelotti, 1847)
- † Stazzania morelletorum Gougerot & Braillon, 1968
- † Stazzania occidentalis Le Renard & van Nieulande, 1985
- † Stazzania stenostoma (van Nieulande, 1981)

Species brought into synonymy

- † Stazzania rhytidobasis Lozouet, 1999: synonym of † Dentimargo rhytidobasis (Lozouet, 1999) (original combination)
