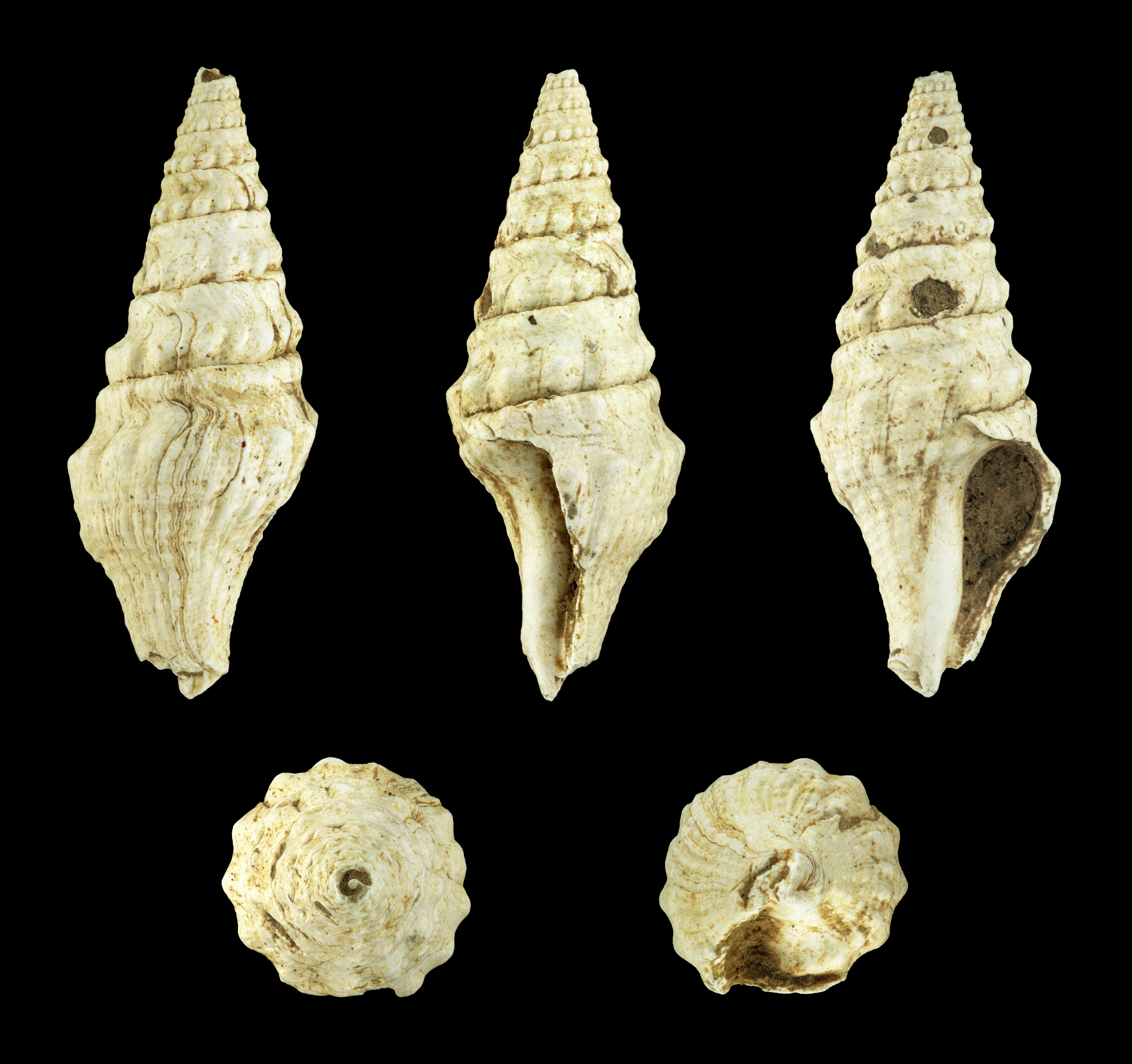
- Shell of † Trachelochetus romanus

Scientific classification
- Kingdom: Animalia
- Phylum: Mollusca
- Class: Gastropoda
- Subclass: Caenogastropoda
- Order: Neogastropoda
- Superfamily: Conoidea
- Family: Clavatulidae
- Genus: †Trachelochetus; Cossmann, 1889

Synonyms
- † Clavatula (Trachelochetus) Cossmann, 1889

= Trachelochetus =

Extinct genus of gastropods

Trachelochetus is an extinct genus of sea snails, marine gastropod mollusks in the family Clavatulidae.

== Species ==
- † Trachelochetus bituberculata Cossmann, 1901
- † Trachelochetus desmius (F. E. Edwards, 1857)
- † Trachelochetus romanus (Defrance,1826)
