= Adinus =

Scientific classification
- Kingdom: Animalia
- Phylum: Mollusca
- Class: Gastropoda
- Subclass: Caenogastropoda
- Order: Neogastropoda
- Superfamily: Buccinoidea
- Family: Nassariidae
- Genus: Adinus; H. Adams & A. Adams, 1853

Type species
- Bullia truncata Reeve, 1846

Synonyms
- Bullia (Adinus) H. Adams & A. Adams, 1853; Pseudostrombus (Adinus) H. Adams & A. Adams, 1853 ·

Genus of gastropods

Adinus is a genus of sea snails, marine gastropod mollusks in the family Nassariidae, the Nassa mud snails or dog whelks.

== Description ==
The subulate shell is spirally striated. The columella is abruptly truncate at its base. The inner lip is corrugated, with a callosity at hind part. The outer lip is grooved internally, externally marginated.

== Species ==
- † Adinus tjidamarensis (K. Martin, 1879)
- Adinus truncatus (Reeve, 1846)
