= Lenitrophon =

Scientific classification
- Kingdom: Animalia
- Phylum: Mollusca
- Class: Gastropoda
- Subclass: Caenogastropoda
- Order: Neogastropoda
- Family: Muricidae
- Genus: Lenitrophon
- Species: L. convexus

Binomial name
- Lenitrophon convexus (Suter, 1909)

Synonyms
- Axymene traversi convexus Fleming, 1951; Trophon convexus Suter, 1909; Xymene convexus (Suter, 1909)

Monotypic genus of gastropod

Lenitrophon is a monotypic genus of predatory sea snail, a marine gastropod mollusc in the family Muricidae, the rock snails or murex snails. Its sole species is Lenitrophon convexus. This marine species is endemic to New Zealand.
