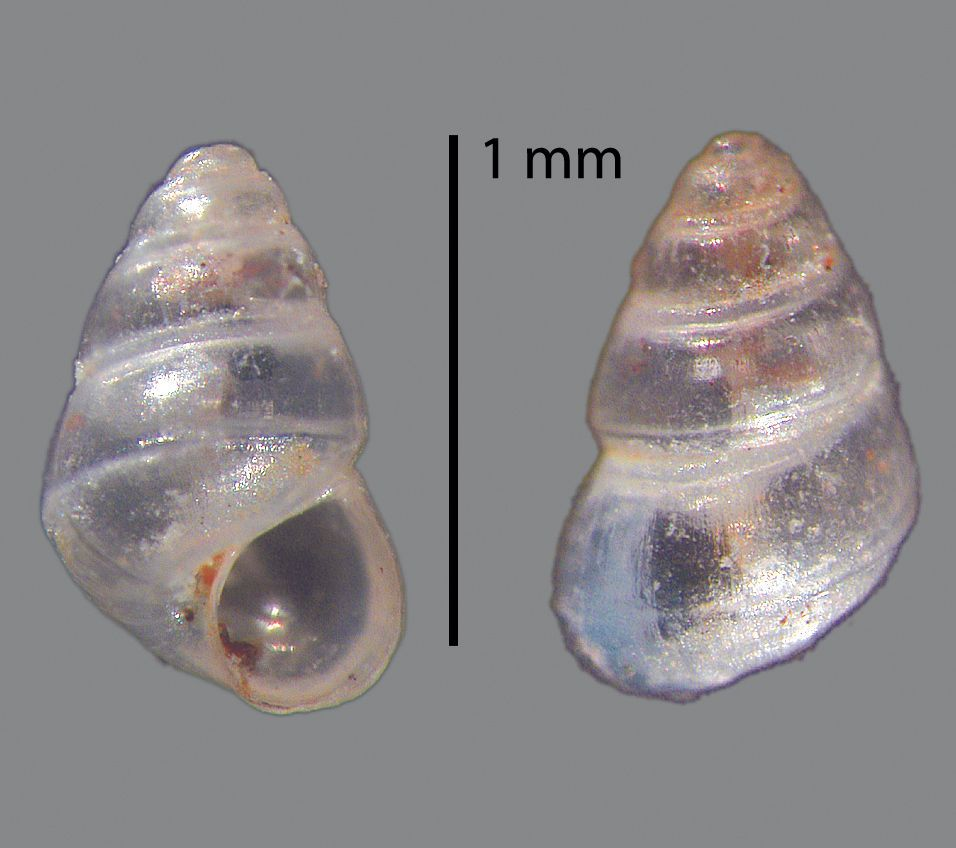
- Lucidestea Laseron

Scientific classification
- Kingdom: Animalia
- Phylum: Mollusca
- Class: Gastropoda
- Subclass: Caenogastropoda
- Order: Littorinimorpha
- Family: Rissoidae
- Genus: Lucidestea; Laseron, 1956

Type species
- Lucidestea vitrea Laseron, 1956

Synonyms
- Falsisetia A. N. Golikov & Kussakin, 1967

= Lucidestea =

Genus of gastropods

Lucidestea is a genus of minute sea snails, marine gastropod mollusks or micromollusks in the family Rissoidae.

== Species ==
Species within the genus Lucidestea include:

- Lucidestea atkinsoni (Tenison Woods, 1876)
- Lucidestea fulgida (Dunker, 1882)
- † Lucidestea goikulensis (Ladd, 1966)
- Lucidestea ina (Thiele, 1925)
- Lucidestea intermedia (Thiele, 1930)
- Lucidestea laterea Laseron, 1956
- Lucidestea maculosa Laseron, 1956
- Lucidestea microscopica (Thiele, 1925)
- Lucidestea milium (Thiele, 1925)
- Lucidestea minima (A. Adams, 1860)
- Lucidestea mundula (A. Adams, 1860)
- Lucidestea muratensis (Cotton, 1944)
- Lucidestea nitens (Frauenfeld, 1867)
- Lucidestea obesa Laseron, 1956
- Lucidestea ornata (A. N. Golikov & Kussakin, 1967)
- Lucidestea pallaryi (Hornung & Mermod, 1927)
- Lucidestea perforata Laseron, 1956
- Lucidestea poolei (Hedley, 1899)
- Lucidestea scalpta (Thiele, 1930)
- † Lucidestea suvaensis (Ladd, 1966) †
- Lucidestea vitrea Laseron, 1956

Synonyms

- Lucidestea capricornea (Hedley, 1907): synonym of Eatonina capricornea (Hedley, 1907) (superseded combination)
- Lucidestea sublacuna Laseron, 1956 : synonym of Voorwindia sublacuna (Laseron, 1956) (original name)
