= Seminola =

- Neighborhood of Hialeah, Florida
- Interactive map of Seminola
- Coordinates: 25.842605°N 80.294475°W
- Country: United States
- State: Florida
- County: Miami-Dade County
- City: Hialeah

Government
  - City of Hialeah Mayor: Esteban Bovo
  - House of Representatives: Jose R. Oliva (R)
  - State Senate: Rene Garcia (R)
  - U.S. House: Mario Díaz-Balart (R)

Population (2010)
  - Total: 1,085
- Time zone: UTC-05 (EST)
- ZIP code: 33010
- Area codes: 305, 786, 645

Seminola (also known as Seminola City) is a historically African-American neighborhood in Hialeah, Florida, United States. Although originally somewhat larger, the current area is bound by West 25th and West 26th Streets to the north, West 8th Avenue to the west, the Hialeah Expressway to the south, and Red Road to the east.

Located just west of the Hialeah Park Race Track, the neighborhood was developed in 1924 for the African American laborers who built the race track. Both physical and racial barriers saved Seminola from being absorbed into the industrial district that now surrounds it. Originally almost 100% black, that percentage had dropped to 50% in the 1970s due to residents moving elsewhere and the influx of Cuban exiles into Hialeah. As of the 2010 census, the neighborhood was only 25.3% black, and 73.2% Hispanic. Three historically black churches remain in the neighborhood, along with several stores and Cotson Park, which was named after a local African-American activist.
