= Gemmaterebra =

Scientific classification
- Kingdom: Animalia
- Phylum: Mollusca
- Class: Gastropoda
- Subclass: Caenogastropoda
- Order: Neogastropoda
- Superfamily: Conoidea
- Family: Terebridae
- Genus: †Gemmaterebra; Cotton, 1952

Type species
- † Terebra catenifera Tate 1886

Species
- See text.

Extinct genus of gastropods

Gemmaterebra is an extinct genus of sea snails, marine gastropod mollusks in the family Terebridae, the auger snails.

== Species ==
Species within the genus Gemmaterebra include:

- † Gemmaterebra bicorona (Hutton, 1885)
- † Gemmaterebra catenifera Tate 1886.
- † Gemmaterebra subcatenifera Tate 1889

== Distribution ==
The species of this genus were found in Tertiary strata in Australia
