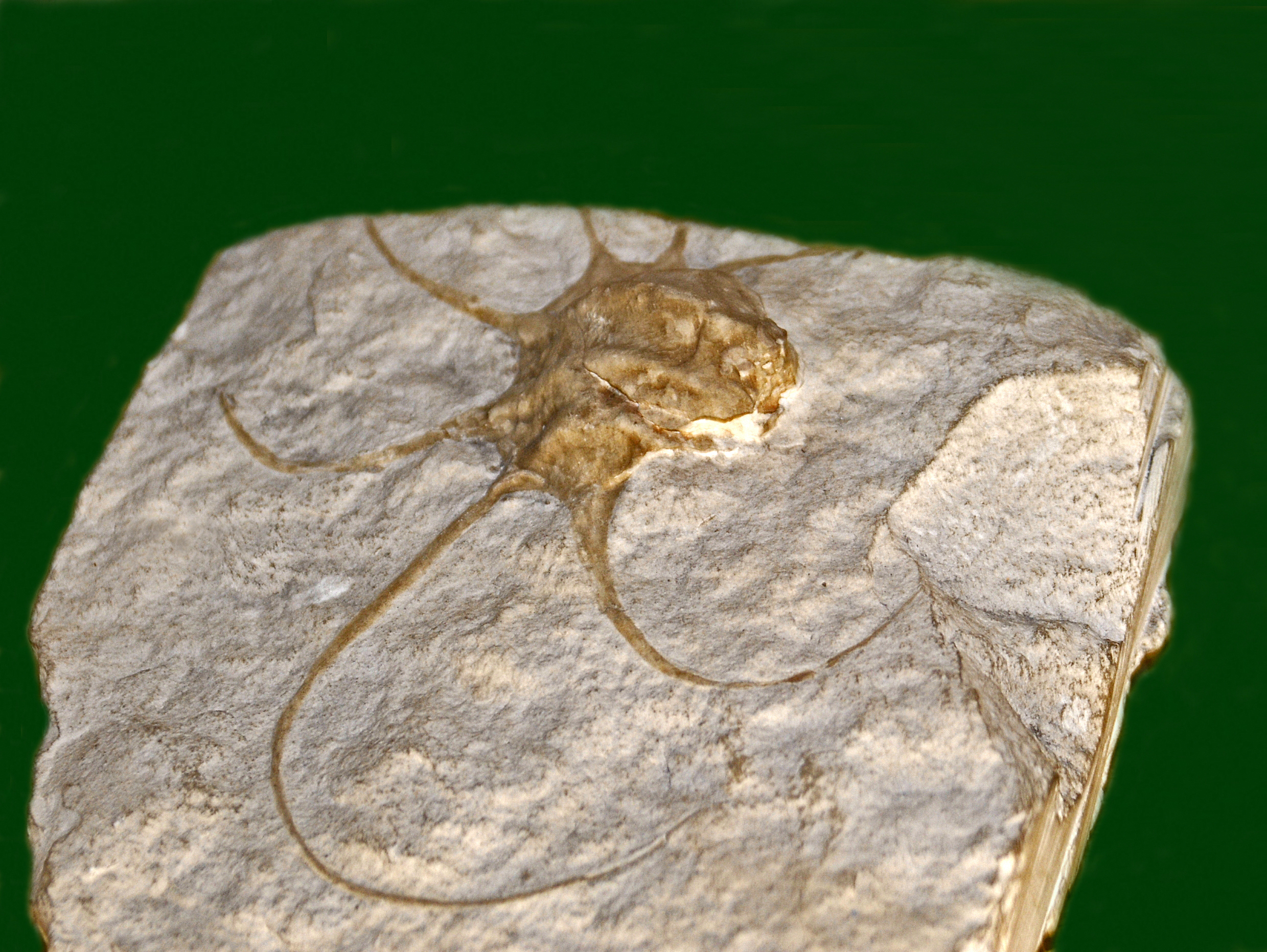
- Fossil shell of Harpagodes aranea, on display at Galerie de paléontologie et d'anatomie comparée, Paris

Scientific classification
- Kingdom: Animalia
- Phylum: Mollusca
- Class: Gastropoda
- Subclass: Caenogastropoda
- Family: Harpagodidae; Pchelintsev, 1963

= Harpagodidae =

Harpagodidae Temporal range: from Jurassic to Cretaceous

Extinct family of gastropods

Harpagodidae is an extinct family of fossil sea snails, marine gastropod mollusks.

== Genera ==
Genera within the family Harpagodidae include:

- Harpagodes Gill, 1870 †
- Phyllocheilus Gabb, 1868 †
