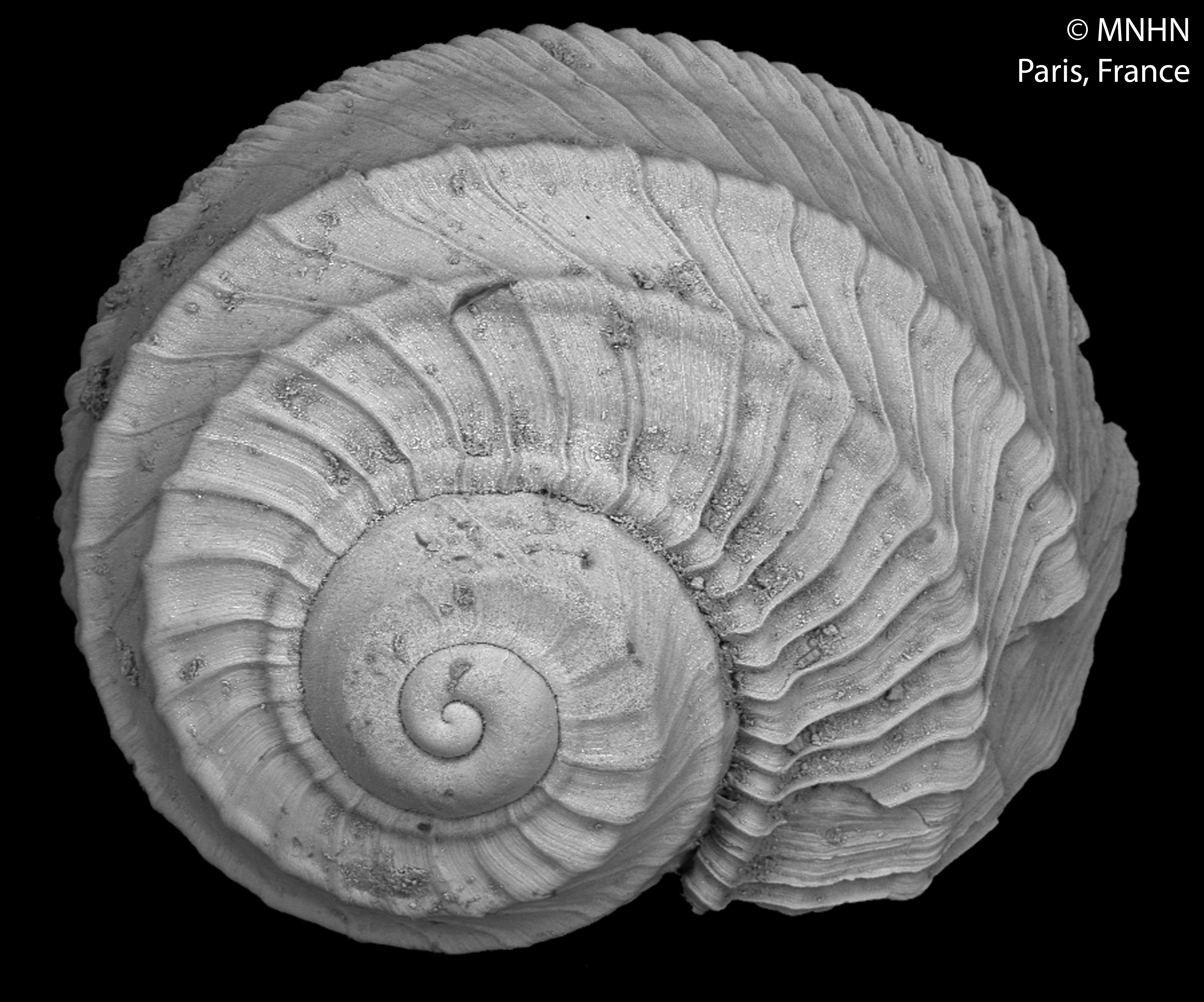
- Shell of Tornus propinquus (holotype at MNHN, Paris)

Scientific classification
- Kingdom: Animalia
- Phylum: Mollusca
- Class: Gastropoda
- Subclass: Caenogastropoda
- Order: Littorinimorpha
- Superfamily: Truncatelloidea
- Family: Tornidae
- Genus: Tornus; Turton & Kingston, 1830

Type species
- Helix subcarinata Montagu, 1803

Synonyms
- Adeorbis S. V. Wood, 1842

= Tornus (gastropod) =

Genus of gastropods

Tornus is a genus of sea snails, marine gastropod mollusks in the family Tornidae.

This genus is represented in the fossil record, notably in the London Clay Formation.

== Species ==
Species in the genus Tornus include:

- Tornus aemilii Rolán & Rubio, 2002
- Tornus africanus Adam & Knudsen, 1969
- Tornus anselmoi Rolán & Rubio, 2002
- †Tornus aquitanicus Lozouet, 1998
- Tornus atomus (Morelet, 1882)
- Tornus attenuatus Rolán & Rubio, 2002
- Tornus aupouria (Powell, 1937)
- Tornus axiotimus (Melvill & Standen, 1903)
- Tornus calianus (Dall, 1919)
- Tornus cancellatus Adam & Knudsen, 1969
- Tornus caraboboensis (Weisbord, 1962)
- Tornus carinatus (A. Adams, 1863)
- † Tornus dysporistus Lozouet, 1998
- Tornus erici Rolán & Rubio, 2002
- Tornus galaensis M. Fekih & L. Gougerot, 1975
- Tornus garrawayi Adam & Knudsen, 1969
- Tornus greyana (J.T.C. Ratzeburg, 1848)
- Tornus jullieni Adam & Knudsen, 1969
- Tornus laevicarinatus Hansson, 1985
- Tornus leloupi Adam & Knudsen, 1969
- Tornus maoria (Powell, 1937)
- Tornus mienisi van Aartsen, Carrozza & Menkhorst, 1998
- † Tornus pedemontanus Pavia, 1980
- † Tornus primitivus Moroni & Ruggieri, 1985
- Tornus propinquus Rubio & Rolán, 2018
- Tornus propinquus Rubio & Rolán, 2018
- Tornus rachelae Rolán & Rubio, 2002
- Tornus ryalli Rolán & Rubio, 2002
- Tornus schrammii (P. Fischer, 1857)
- †Tornus sinuosus Lozouet, 1998
- Tornus subangulatus (A. Adams, 1863)
- Tornus subcarinatus (Montagu, 1803)
- † Tornus superlatus Landau, Ceulemans & Van Dingenen, 2018
- Tornus trochulus (A. Adams, 1863)
- Tornus umbilicorda Rolán & Rubio, 2002

Names brought to synonymy

- † Tornus basiglabra M. Fekih & L. Gougerot, 1975: synonym of † Tornus pedemontanus Pavia, 1980
- † Tornus canui de Morgan, 1920: synonym of † Discopsis canui (de Morgan, 1920) (original combination)
- † Tornus dollfusi Cossmann, 1918: synonym of † Tornus subcarinatus (Montagu, 1803)
- † Tornus falunicus de Morgan, 1920: synonym of † Discopsis falunica (de Morgan, 1920) (original combination)
- Tornus fragilis Sars, 1878: synonym of Rugulina fragilis (Sars, 1878)
- † Tornus canui de Morgan, 1920: synonym of † Discopsis canui (de Morgan, 1920) (original combination)
- † Tornus dollfusi Cossmann, 1918 : synonym of † Tornus subcarinatus (Montagu, 1803)
- † Tornus falunicus de Morgan, 1920 : synonym of † Discopsis falunica (de Morgan, 1920) (original combination)
- Tornus planus (A. Adams, 1850): synonym of Sigaretornus planus (A. Adams, 1850)
- † Tornus pontileviensis de Morgan, 1920: synonym of † Discopsis pontileviensis (de Morgan, 1920) (original combination)
- † Tornus praecursor (Tate, 1873): synonym of † Valvata praecursor Tate, 1873 ( superseded combination)
- † Tornus subcirculus Cossmann & Peyrot, 1917: synonym of † Circulus subcirculus (Cossmann & Peyrot, 1917) (original combination)
- Tornus tornaticus Moolenbeek & Hoenselaar, 1995: synonym of Ponderinella tornatica (Moolenbeek & Hoenselaar, 1995) (original combination)

== See also ==
- List of marine gastropod genera in the fossil record
