= Favriella =

Scientific classification
- Kingdom: Animalia
- Phylum: Mollusca
- Class: Gastropoda
- Subclass: Caenogastropoda
- Order: Neogastropoda
- Superfamily: Conoidea
- Family: Raphitomidae
- Genus: †Favriella; Hornung, 1920

Type species
- † Favriella weberi Hornung, A., 1920

Species
- See text

Genus of sea snails

Favriella is a monotypic genus of extinct sea snails, marine gastropod mollusks in the family Raphitomidae.

== Species ==
- † Favriella weberi Hornung, A., 1920
