= Adelocythara =

- Shell of † Adelocythara primolevis (holotype at the Smithsonian Instotution)

Scientific classification
- Kingdom: Animalia
- Phylum: Mollusca
- Class: Gastropoda
- Subclass: Caenogastropoda
- Order: Neogastropoda
- Superfamily: Conoidea
- Family: Mangeliidae
- Genus: Adelocythara; Woodring, 1928

Type species
- † Adelocythara primolevis Woodring, W.P., 1928

Species
- See text

Genus of gastropods

Adelocythara is a genus of minute sea snails, marine gastropod mollusks or micromollusks in the family Mangeliidae.

== Description ==
(Original description) The small shell is slender. The protoconch is stout, broad-tipped, consisting of between one and a half and two whorls, the last quarter whorl or less bearing a few fine protractive axial riblets.

The aperture is long,-and narrow. The siphonal canal is very shortand barely emarginate. The outer lip is varicose. The anal notch is wideand moderately deep. The interior of the outer lip bears a denticle below the notch. The inner lip is smooth.The parietal callus is thickened adjoining anal notch.

The sculpture consists of axial ribs, primary spiral threads, and minute spirals roughened by minute axials (frosted sculpture).

== Distribution ==
This species occurs in the Caribbean Sea off Jamaica, Honduras, Trinidad and Tobago, Grenada and Puerto Rico.

Fossils were found in Miocene strata in Jamaica.

== Species ==
Species within the genus Adelocythara include:

- Adelocythara aliceae Fallon & Bouchet, 2026
- Adelocythara bouillantensis Fallon & Bouchet, 2026
- Adelocythara caquetio Fallon, 2026
- Adelocythara caretensis Fallon & Bouchet, 2026
- Adelocythara isabelensis Fallon, 2026
- † Adelocythara micropleura (Guppy, 1867)
- Adelocythara portlouisensis Fallon & Bouchet, 2026
- † Adelocythara primolevis Woodring, 1928
- Adelocythara troyolsoni Fallon, 2026
- Adelocythara youloumani Fallon, 2026
