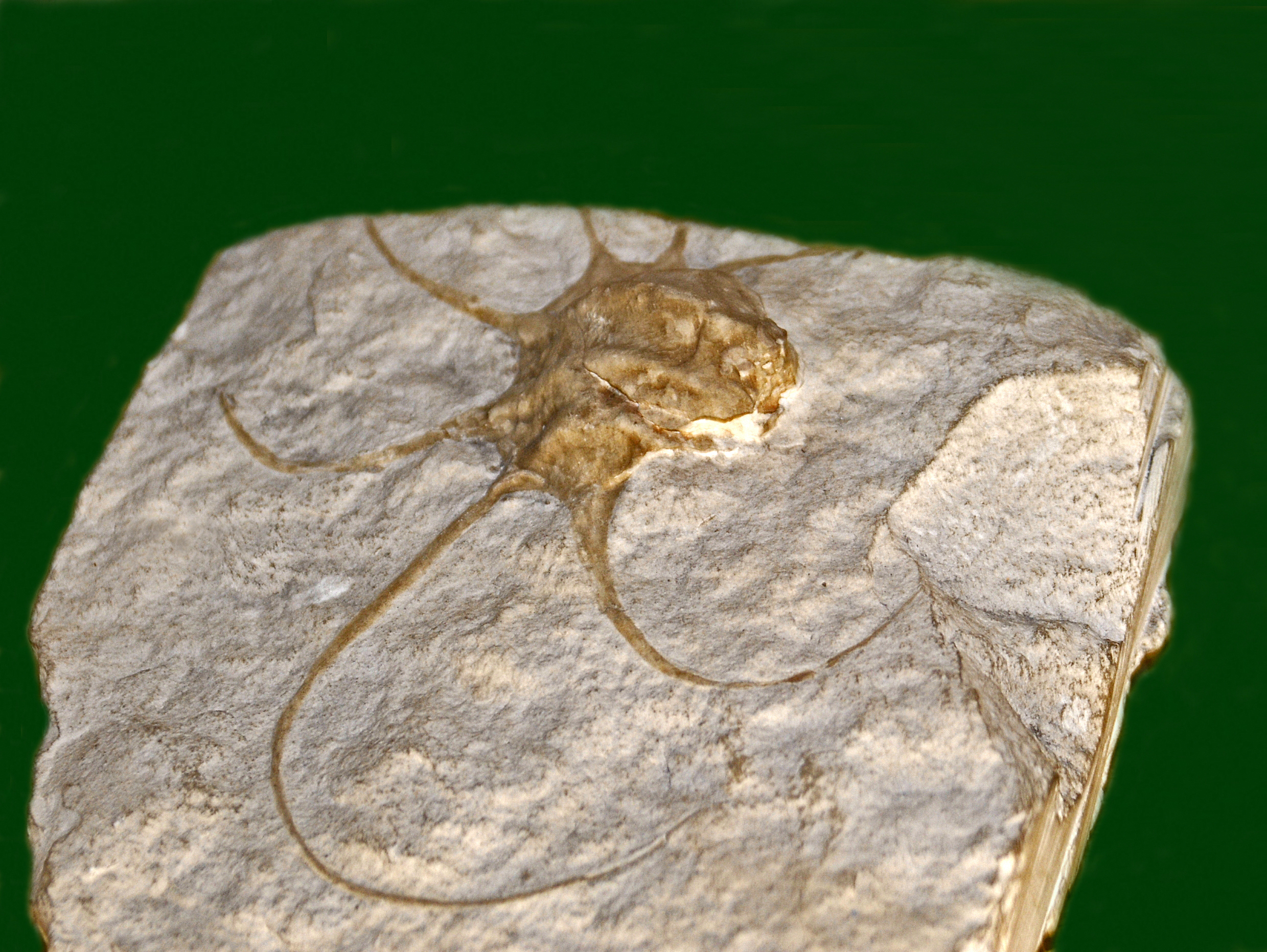
- Fossil shell of Harpagodes aranea, on display at Galerie de paléontologie et d'anatomie comparée, Paris

Scientific classification
- Kingdom: Animalia
- Phylum: Mollusca
- Class: Gastropoda
- Subclass: Caenogastropoda
- Family: †Harpagodidae
- Genus: †Harpagodes; Gill, 1870

= Harpagodes =

Harpagodes Temporal range: from Jurassic to Cretaceous, 183.0–94.3 Ma

Extinct genus of gastropods

Harpagodes is an extinct genus of fossil sea snails, marine gastropod mollusks in the family Harpagodidae.

== Selected species ==
These are some of the species within the genus Harpagodes.

- Harpagodes americanus †
- Harpagodes aranea (d'Orbigny, 1850)
- Harpagodes beaumontiana (d'Orbigny, 1843) †
- Harpagodes desori (Pictet & Campiche, 1864) †
- Harpagodes ignobilis (Morris & Lycett, 1851) †
- Harpagodes incertus †
- Harpagodes japonicus †
- Harpagodes matheroni †
- Harpagodes mexicanus †
- Harpagodes nodosus (J. de C. Sowerby, 1823) †
- Harpagodes oceani †
- Harpagodes pelagi (Brongniart, 1821) †
- Harpagodes ribeiroi Choffat, 1886 †
- Harpagodes rupellentis †
- Harpagodes sachalinensis Yabe & Nago, 1925 †
- Harpagodes shumardi (Hill) †
- Harpagodes thirriae (Contejean) †
- Harpagodes valcuii †
- Harpagodes wrightii (Morris & Lycett, 1851) †

== Description ==
"Shell obconic or ovate-conoid, with the spire moderately elevated, the canal produced into a long boldly recurved towards the left, and the labrum (...) spiniform digitations. Whorls convex or flat between the angle and the suture, spirally ribbed, with larger rib-like angular, median, and anterior fascioles (and sometimes post-angular), each emitting long spiniform digitations; and with a sutural canaliculate digitation accumbent on the spire, continued and recurved backwards." (Original description of Harpagodes by Gill, 1870).

== Distribution ==
Fossils of these snails have been found in the Cretaceous rocks of Austria, Egypt, France, Mexico, Trinidad and Tobago, Yemen and in the Jurassic rocks of Argentina, Ethiopia, Israel, Kenya, Lebanon, Mexico, Portugal, Saudi Arabia, Tanzania and Tunisia.
