= Pyrgolampros =

Scientific classification
- Kingdom: Animalia
- Phylum: Mollusca
- Class: Gastropoda
- Family: Pyramidellidae
- Genus: Pyrgolampros; Sacco, 1892

Genus of gastropods

Pyrgolampros is a genus of sea snails, marine gastropod mollusks in the family Pyramidellidae, the pyrams and their allies.

This genus is now included in the genus Turbonilla Risso, 1826
