= Sphaeronassa =

Scientific classification
- Kingdom: Animalia
- Phylum: Mollusca
- Class: Gastropoda
- Subclass: Caenogastropoda
- Order: Neogastropoda
- Family: Nassariidae
- Genus: Sphaeronassa

Genus of gastropods

Sphaeronassa is a genus of sea snails, marine gastropod mollusks in the family Nassariidae, the Nassa mud snails or dog whelks.

The genus Sphaeronassa has become a synonym of Nassarius Duméril, 1805

== Species ==
Species within the genus Sphaeronassa include:

- Sphaeronassa mutabilis (Linnaeus, 1758): synonym of Nassarius mutabilis (Linnaeus, 1758)
