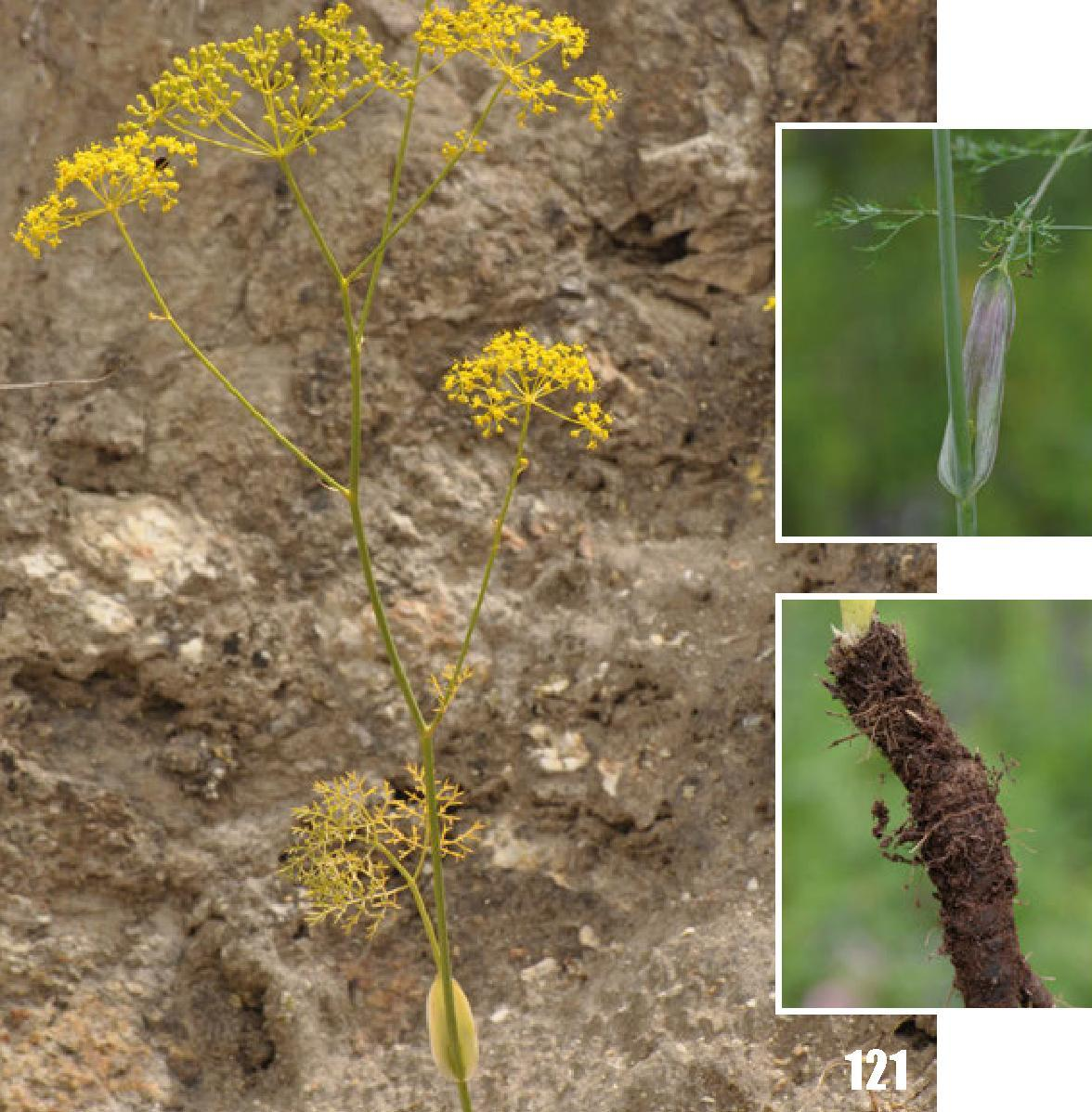
- Galagnia ferganensis

Scientific classification
- Kingdom: Plantae
- Clade: Tracheophytes
- Clade: Angiosperms
- Clade: Eudicots
- Clade: Asterids
- Order: Apiales
- Family: Apiaceae
- Subfamily: Apioideae
- Tribe: Pyramidoptereae
- Genus: Galagania; Lipsky

Synonyms
- Korovinia Nevski & Vved.

= Galagania =

Genus of plants

Galagania is a genus of flowering plants belonging to the family Apiaceae.

Its native range is Central Asia to Afghanistan.

Species:

- Galagania ferganensis (Korovin) M.G.Vassiljeva & Pimenov
- Galagania fragrantissima Lipsky
- Galagania gracilis (Kamelin & Pimenov) Kamelin & Pimenov
- Galagania neglecta M.G.Vassiljeva & Kljuykov
- Galagania tenuisecta (Regel & Schmalh.) M.G.Vassiljeva & Pimenov
