= Uttleya =

Scientific classification
- Kingdom: Animalia
- Phylum: Mollusca
- Class: Gastropoda
- Subclass: Caenogastropoda
- Order: Neogastropoda
- Family: Muricidae
- Subfamily: Ergalataxinae
- Genus: Uttleya; Marwick, 1934

Genus of gastropods

Uttleya is a genus of sea snails, marine gastropod mollusks in the family Muricidae, the murex snails or rock snails.

== Species ==
Species within the genus Uttleya include:

- Uttleya ahiparana (Powell, 1927)
- Uttleya arcana Marwick, 1934
- Uttleya marwicki Powell, 1952
- Uttleya williamsi Powell, 1952
