= Tudicula =

Scientific classification
- Kingdom: Animalia
- Phylum: Mollusca
- Class: Gastropoda
- Subclass: Caenogastropoda
- Order: Neogastropoda
- Family: Turbinellidae
- Subfamily: Vasinae
- Genus: Tudicula; Adams & Adams, 1864

Genus of gastropods

Tudicula is a genus of large sea snails, marine gastropod mollusks in the family Turbinellidae.

In 1987, Rosenberg and Petit reassigned this to a new genus they created, Tudivasum.

== Species ==
Species within the genus Tudicula used to include:

- Tudicula inermis Angas, 1878 : synonym of Tudivasum inerme (Angas, 1878)
- Tudicula kurtzi Macpherson, 1964 : synonym of Tudivasum kurtzi (Macpherson, 1964)
- Tudicula rasilistoma Abbott, 1959 : synonym of Tudivasum rasilistoma (Abbott, 1959)
- Tudicula spinosa (H. & A. Adams, 1864) : synonym of Tudivasum spinosum (H. & A. Adams, 1864)
- Tudicula zanzibarica : synonym of Tudivasum zanzibaricum (Abbott, 1958)
