= Eosurcula =

Eosurcula Temporal range: Eocene to Paleocene (61.7 to 37.2 Ma)

Scientific classification
- Domain: Eukaryota
- Kingdom: Animalia
- Phylum: Mollusca
- Class: Gastropoda
- Subclass: Caenogastropoda
- Order: Neogastropoda
- Superfamily: Conoidea
- Family: Turridae
- Genus: †Eosurcula; Casey, 1904

Extinct genus of gastropods

Eosurcula is an extinct genus of gastropod from the Eocene of Asia, Europe, and North America.

== Species ==
- † Eosurcula capayana Vokes 1939
- † Eosurcula cohni Dickerson 1915
- † Eosurcula inconstans Cooper 1894
- † Eosurcula moorei Gabb, 1860 from Bartonian in Texas
- † Eosurcula praeattenuata Gabb 1868
- † Eosurcula stena (Edwards, 1857) from Hampshire

== Original description ==
Genus Eosurcula was originally described by Thomas Lincoln Casey in 1904.

Casey's original text reads as follows:

Eosurcula n. gen.

The embryo in Eosurcula is much narrower than in Protosurcula, strongly elevated and smooth throughout, the subsutural collar smaller and less developed, the fasciolar surface thence obliquely ascending but straight in profile or nearly so to the obtusely angulate periphery, on and below which the spirals become coarser. The aperture and canal are nearly as in Profosurcula, but the peculiar narrow elevated embryo, perfectly smooth throughout and without riblets, higher shoulder angle and oblique fasciolar surface, less developed subsutural collar and some other differential characters, will readily serve to separate the two genera, which are perhaps the most characteristic and abundant forms of the Lower Claiborne Eocene, — and impart a marked difference in habitus. The species are more numerous than those of the preceding genus, those known to me being outlined as follows: —

Peripheral carina crenulate, at least on the small upper body whorls, situated at the middle and subduples. ... 2

Peripheral carina devoid of any trace of crenulation at any point. ... 5

2 — Larger species, the peripheral carina at or above the middle of the whorls, crenulate on the small or nepionic whorls only. ... 3

Small species, the periphery more obtusely angulate, more feebly carinate and distinctly below the middle of the whorls; all the whorls apparently crenulate on the periphery. ... 4

3 — Peripheral carina at the middle of the whorls, apparently duplex, coarse but only moderately elevated; between it and the base there is another similar double carina; slightly above it, at the lower part of the oblique fasciolar surface, there is a fine spiral carina; declivous space thence to the fine subsutural collar with two or three very fine spiral threads. Texas, Caldwell Co. ... moorei Gabb.

Peripheral carina well above the middle of the whorls; between it and the base there are two carinae, which are apparently smaller than the peripheral and less elevated. Lignitic Eocene of Wood's Bluff, Ala. ... taomeyi Aid .

4 — Moderately stout, the subsutural collar small; surface thence regularly ascending to the crenulate periphery and having two or three coarse but feeble spiral lines; surface below the periphery on the spire whorls with two rather coarse and widely spaced carinules in low relief; below these on the body whorl the surface is closely, evenly lyrate. Upper Claiborne ferruginous sand [Conus]. ... pulcherrima Hellp.

5 — Peripheral carina double, its upper carinule smaller and less prominent than the lower, the latter a little below the middle; subsutural carina unusually strong, at some distance below the suture, the surface thence to the upper peripheral carina regularly oblique, with a single carinule at lower two-fifths; on the larger whorls a few other very minute and inconspicuous threads can be observed; surface below the lower peripheral carina, with two carinae, the uppermost interval thus formed much the larger, both with an intermediate central and feeble thread; lyrae on the body whorl moderately coarse, well separated and only occasionally with intermediate threads. Length of a specimen of 6 body whorls, 22 mm.; width, 6 mm. Lower Claiborne Eocene of Lisbon, Ala. ... concinna n. sp.

Peripheral carina single, narrow but strongly elevated, at the middle; subsutural carina, fine; surface thence to the periphery regularly oblique and covered with rather close-set, fine but sharply elevated threads, the one nearest the peripheral carina much the largest; surface below the peripheral carina cylindric, with a similar carina a little below its middle and another near the lower edge; space between the peripheral carina and the one next below with a finer carina a little below its middle. Length of a fragment consisting of the embryo and 4 spire whorls, 5.6 mm.; width, 3 mm. Lower Claiborne Eocene of St. Maurice, La. ... helicoidea n. sp.

Mr. Aldrich mentions no crenulation on the periphery of the nepionic whorls of tuomeyi, but these are said to exist by Prof. Harris.
