= Ninella =

Scientific classification
- Domain: Eukaryota
- Clade: Sar
- Clade: Rhizaria
- Phylum: Foraminifera
- Class: †Fusulinata
- Order: †Endothyrida
- Family: †Eoendothyranopsidae
- Genus: †Ninella; Malakhova, 1975

Species
- †Ninella asiatica Malakhova, 1975; †Ninella staffelliformis (Chernysheva, 1948)

Synonyms
- Eoendothyranopsis (Ninella) Ponomarjova, 2009 (Nomen translatum)

Genus of single-celled organisms

Ninella is a genus of fusulinoidean forams from the Lower Carboniferous, included in the family Ozawainellidae and subfamily Pseudostaffellinae.
