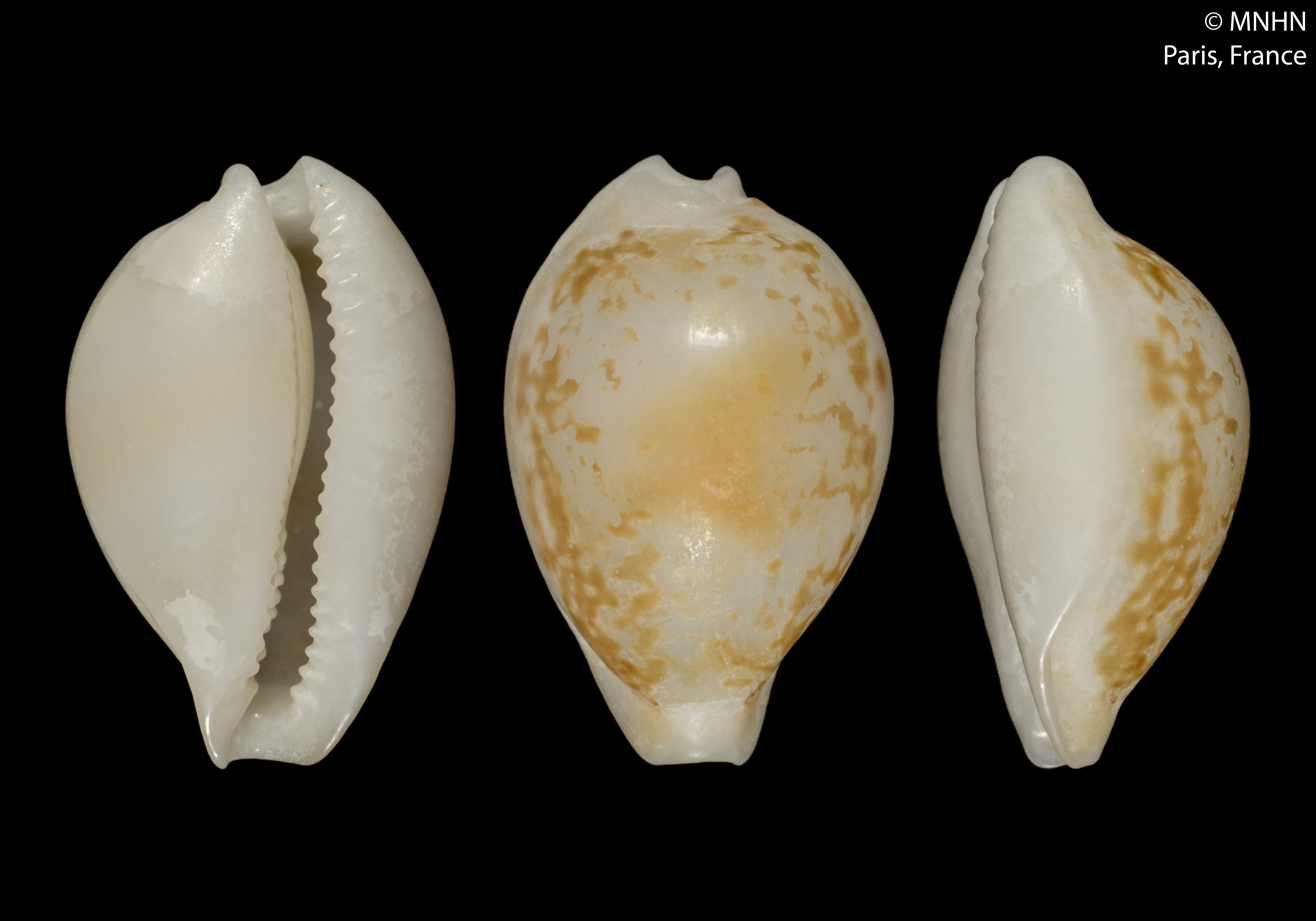
- Shell of Nesiocypraea midwayensis kontiki (holotype at MNHN, Paris)

Scientific classification
- Kingdom: Animalia
- Phylum: Mollusca
- Class: Gastropoda
- Subclass: Caenogastropoda
- Order: Littorinimorpha
- Superfamily: Cypraeoidea
- Family: Cypraeidae
- Genus: Nesiocypraea; Azuma & Kurohara, 1967

Type species
- Nesiocypraea midwayensis Azuma & Kurohara, 1967

Synonyms
- Cypraea (Nesiocypraea) Azuma & Kurohara, 1967; Kurodadusta Shikama, 1971

= Nesiocypraea =

Genus of gastropods

Nesiocypraea is a genus of sea snails, marine gastropod mollusks in the family Cypraeidae, the cowries.

== Species ==
Species within the genus Nesiocypraea include:

- Nesiocypraea aenigma Lorenz, 2002
- Nesiocypraea lisetae Kilburn, 1975
- Nesiocypraea midwayensis Azuma & Kurohara, 1967
  - Nesiocypraea midwayensis kontiki Lorenz, 2012
  - Nesiocypraea midwayensis midwayensis Azuma & Kurohara, 1967
- Nesiocypraea teramachii (Kuroda, 1938)
  - Nesiocypraea teramachii neocaledonica Lorenz, 2002
  - Nesiocypraea teramachii polyphemus Lorenz, 2002
- Nesiocypraea thachi F. Huber, 2020

Species brought into synonymy

- Nesiocypraea axelhuberti Lorenz & Hubert, 2000: synonym of Austrasiatica alexhuberti Lorenz and Huber, 2000
- Nesiocypraea axelhuberti Lorenz & Huber, 2000: synonym of Austrasiatica alexhuberti (Lorenz & Huber, 2000)
- Nesiocypraea deforgesi Lorenz, 2002: synonym of Austrasiatica deforgesi Lorenz, 2002
- Nesiocypraea hirasei (Roberts, 1913) synonym of Austrasiatica hirasei (Roberts, 1913)
- Nesiocypraea langfordi(Kuroda, 1938): synonym of Austrasiatica langfordi (Kuroda, 1938)
- Nesiocypraea maricola Cate, 1976: synonym of Nesiocypraea lisetae Kilburn, 1975
- Nesiocypraea sakurai Habe, 1970: synonym of Austrasiatica sakurai (Habe, 1970)
- Nesiocypraea sakuraii (Habe, 1970): synonym of Austrasiatica sakurai (Habe, 1970)
