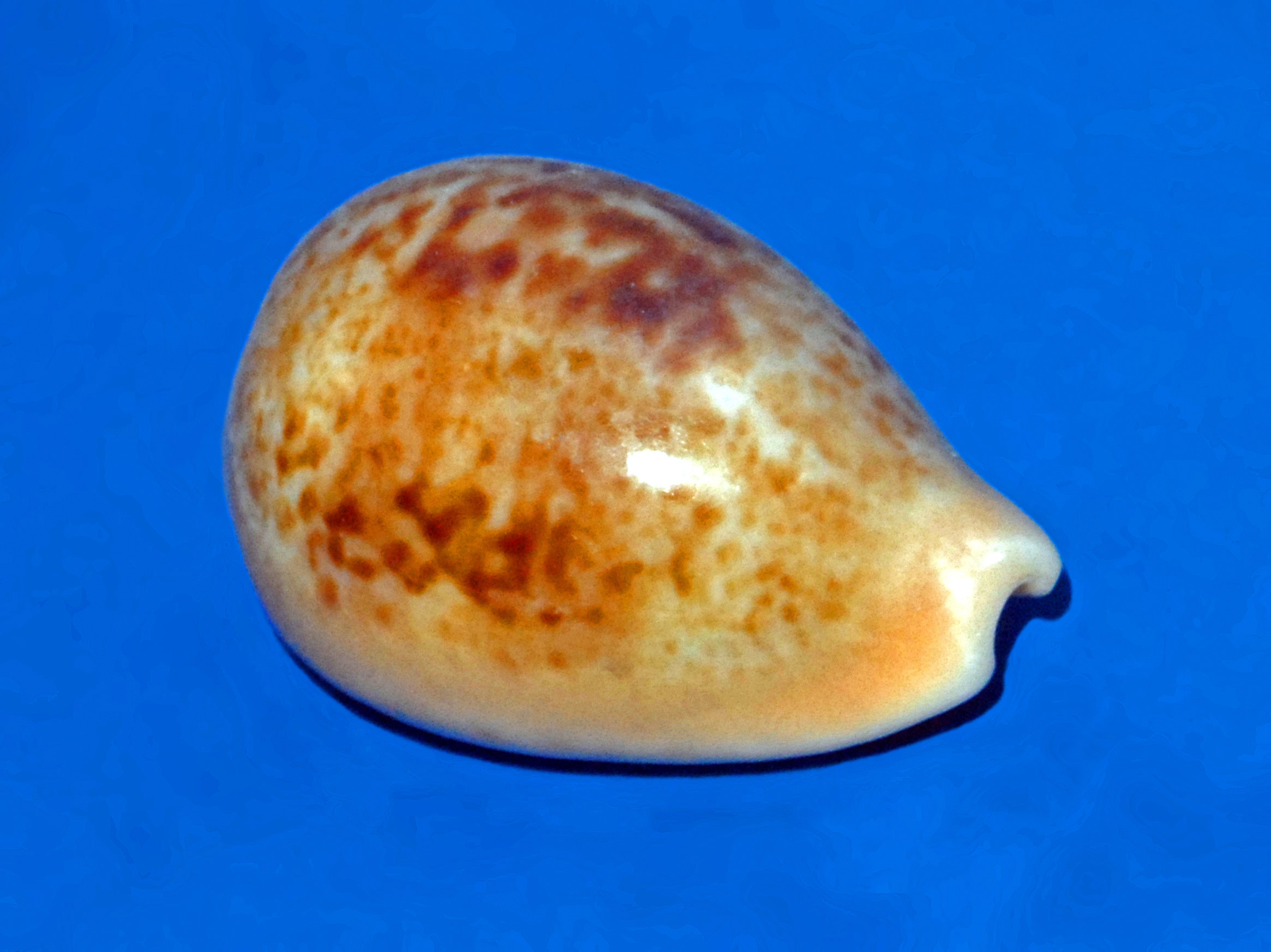
- Shell of Schilderia achatidea from Sicily at the Museo Civico di Storia Naturale di Milano

Scientific classification
- Kingdom: Animalia
- Phylum: Mollusca
- Class: Gastropoda
- Subclass: Caenogastropoda
- Order: Littorinimorpha
- Family: Cypraeidae
- Genus: Schilderia; Tomlin, 1930

= Schilderia =

Schilderia Temporal range: Miocene - Recent

Genus of gastropods

Schilderia is a genus of sea snails, marine gastropod mollusks in the family Cypraeidae, the cowries.

This is a nomen nudum. Almost all species of this genus have become synonyms in Schilderina Dolin & Aguerre, 2020

== Description and distribution ==
The shell size of these sea snails varies between 22 mm and 50 mm. The dorsum surface is usually brown, while the base is white. Species within this genus are widespread in the western Mediterranean Sea and along the coasts of the western Africa.

== Fossil records ==
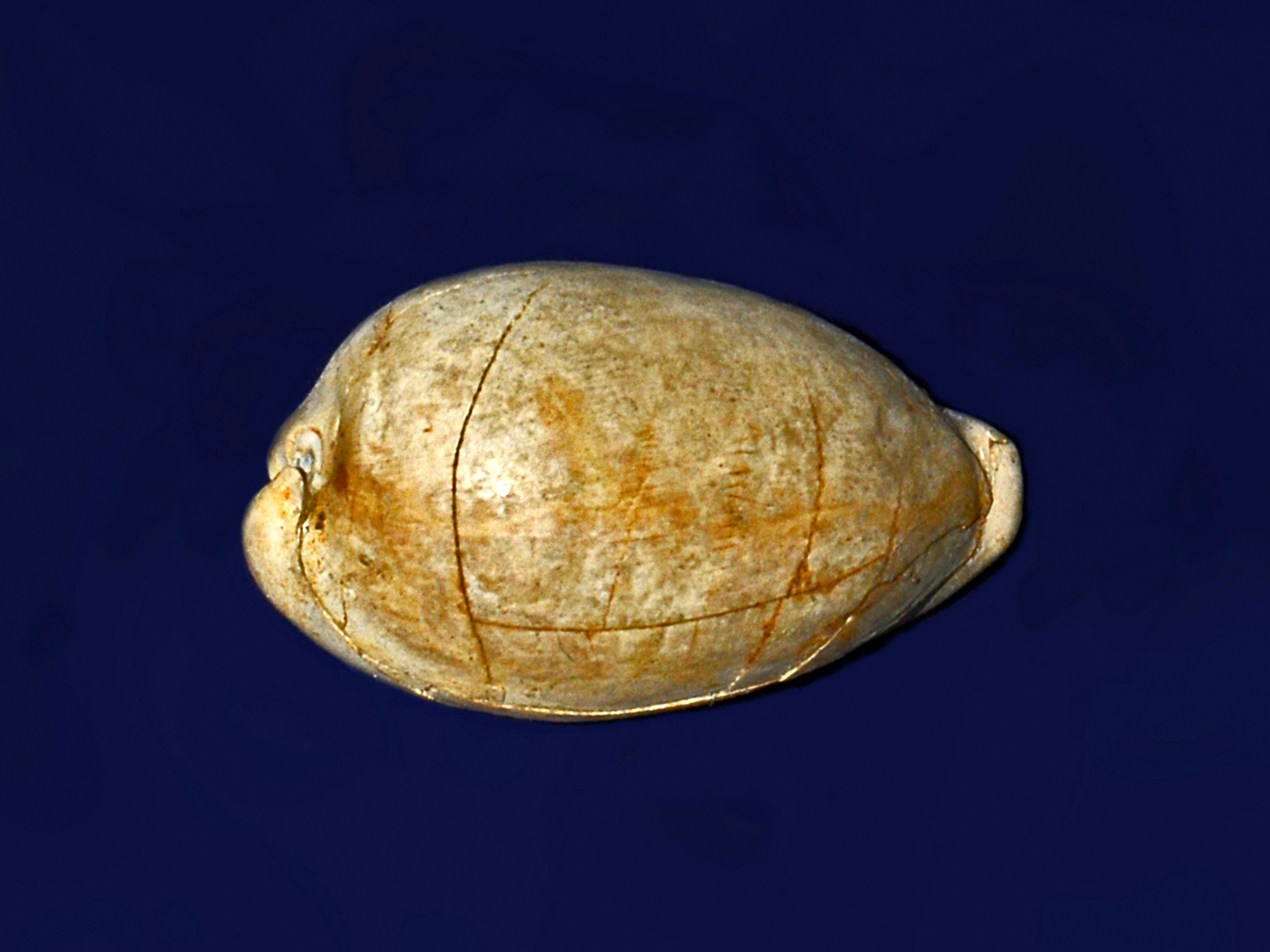
Fossil shell of Schilderia longiscata from Pliocene of Italy

The fossil record of this genus dates back to the Miocene (age range: from 23.03 to 2.588 million years ago). These fossils have been found in Italy, Spain, France and Greece.

== Species ==
Species within the genus Schilderia include:

Species brought into synonymy

- Schilderia achatidea (Gray in Sowerby II, 1837): synonym of Schilderina achatidea (Gray, 1837)
- Schilderia sakuraii Habe, 1970 is a synonym of Austrasiatica sakuraii (Habe, 1970)

Fossil species:

- † Schilderia amygdalum (Brocchi, 1814):synonym of †Schilderina amygdalum (Brocchi, 1814)
- † Schilderia andegavensis (Defrance, 1826):synonym of † Schilderina andegavensis (Defrance, 1826)
- † Schilderia brebioni Dolin & Lozouet, 2004: †Schilderina brebioni (Dolin & Lozouet, 2004) (original combination)
- † Schilderia columbaria (Lamarck, 1810):synonym of † Schilderina columbaria (Lamarck, 1822)
- † Schilderia decorticata (Defrance, 1826)
- † Schilderia fasciolaria Dolin & Lozouet, 2004: synonym of †Schilderia brebioni Dolin & Lozouet, 2004: synonym of † Schilderina brebioni (Dolin & Lozouet, 2004)
- † Schilderia flavicula (Lamarck, 1810):synonym of Schilderina longiscata (Mayer, 1875)
- † Schilderia garonettii Fehse, 2004
- † Schilderia incognita Dolin & Lozouet, 2004:synonym of † Schilderia brebioni Dolin & Lozouet, 2004 synonym of † Schilderina brebioni (Dolin & Lozouet, 2004)
- † Schilderia lauriatae Dolin & Lozouet, 2004:synonym of †Schilderia brebioni Dolin & Lozouet, 2004 synonym of † Schilderina brebioni (Dolin & Lozouet, 2004)
- † Schilderia longiscata (Mayer, 1875)
- † Schilderia plioamygdalum (Sacco, 1894)
- † Schilderia pseudamygdalum (Sacco, 1894)
- † Schilderia semidenticulata (Sacco, 1894)
- † Schilderia subannularia (d'Orbigny, 1852)
- † Schilderia taurovalis (Sacco, 1894)
- † Schilderia utricolata (Lamarck, 1810)
- † Schilderia veronicata Dolin & Lozouet 2004: synonym of † Schilderia brebioni Dolin & Lozouet, 2004: synonym of † Schilderina brebioni (Dolin & Lozouet, 2004)
