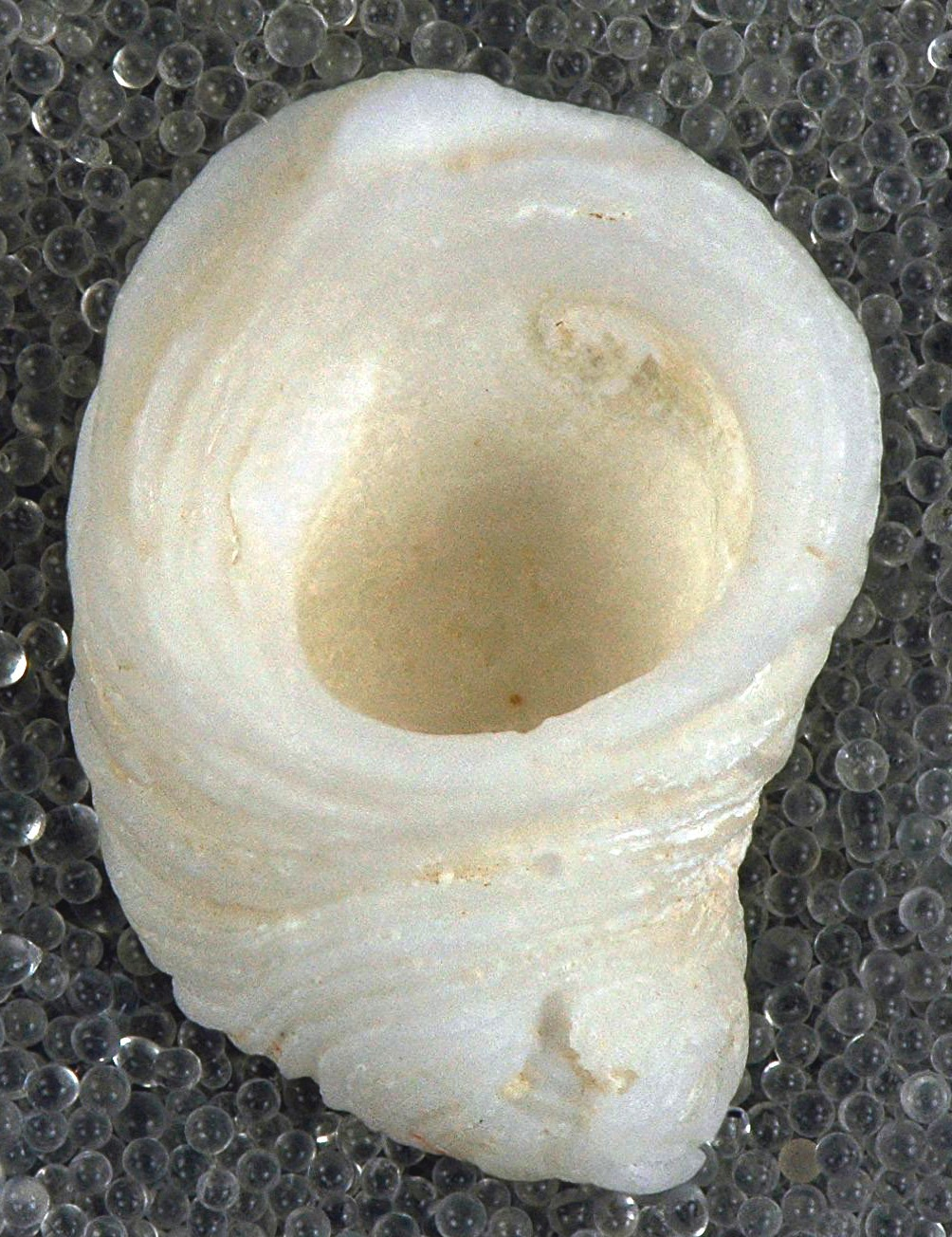
- Hipponix antiquatus shell

Scientific classification
- Kingdom: Animalia
- Phylum: Mollusca
- Class: Gastropoda
- Subclass: Caenogastropoda
- Order: Littorinimorpha
- Family: Hipponicidae
- Genus: Hipponix; DeFrance, 1819

Species
- See text

Synonyms
- Hipponyx Defrance, 1819 (alternate representation)

= Hipponix =

Genus of gastropods

Hipponix, common name hoof snails or hoof shells, is a genus of small sea snails with limpet-like shells, marine gastropod molluscs in the family Hipponicidae, the hoof snails. Many (but not all) of the species in this genus have white shells.

== Species ==
Species within the genus Hipponix include:

- Hipponix antiquatus (Linnaeus, 1767)
- Hipponix benthophila (Dall, 1889)
- Hipponix climax Simone, 2005
- Hipponix conicus (Schumacher, 1817)
  - Hipponix conicus wyattae (Powell, 1958)
- Hipponix costellatus Carpenter, 1856
- Hipponix cranioides Carpenter, 1864
- Hipponix delicatus Dall, 1908
- Hipponix floridanus Olsson & Harbison, 1953
- Hipponix grayanus Menke, 1853
- Hipponix imbricatus
- Hipponix incurvus (Gmelin, 1791)
- Hipponix leptus Simone, 2002
- Hipponix mogul Chino, 2006
- Hipponix panamensis C.B. Adams, 1852
- Hipponix pilosus (Deshayes, 1832)
- Hipponix planatus Carpenter, 1857
- Hipponix subrufus (Lamarck, 1822)
- Hipponix ticaonicus Sowerby, 1846
- Hipponix tumens Carpenter, 1864 - ribbed hoofsnail

NOTE: According to notes in Rosenberg, 2009, the online database Malacolog 4.1.1, H. antiquatus was described without a type locality. This same species was previously considered to occur in both the Eastern Pacific and the Western Atlantic, but some records of this species from the Western Atlantic may in fact be H. leptus instead.

Species brought into synonymy

- Hipponix acutus Quoy & Gaimard, 1835: synonym of Hipponix conicus (Schumacher, 1817)
- Hipponix australis (Lamarck, 1819): synonym of Sabia australis (Lamarck, 1819)
- Hipponix barbatus Sowerby, 1835: synonym of Hipponix pilosus (Deshayes, 1832)
- Hipponix inexpectata Mestayer, 1929: synonym of Spirobranchus latiscapus (Marenzeller, 1885)
- Hipponix lissus (E.A. Smith, 1894): synonym of Malluvium lissum (E. A. Smith, 1894)
