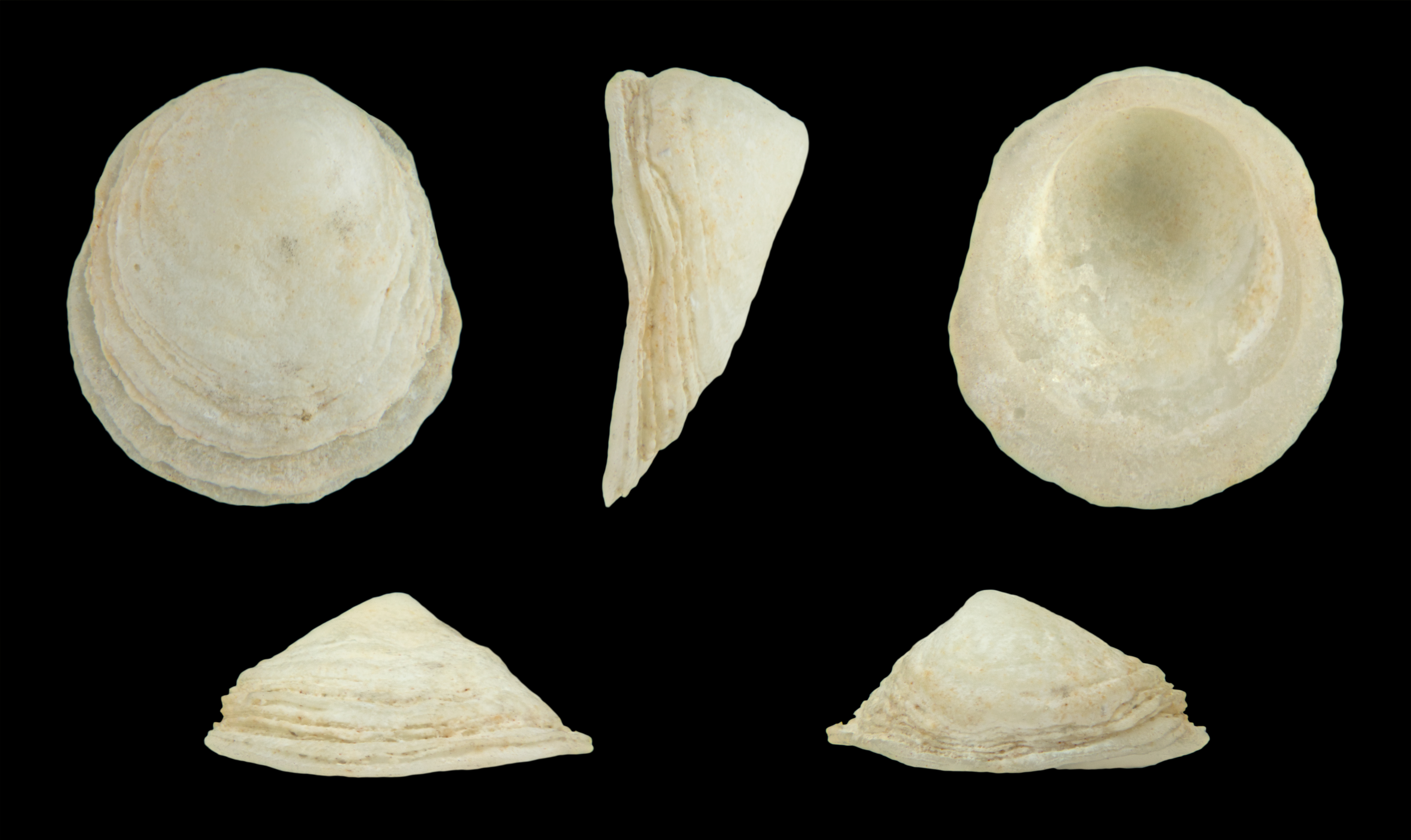

Scientific classification
- Kingdom: Animalia
- Phylum: Mollusca
- Class: Gastropoda
- Subclass: Caenogastropoda
- Order: Littorinimorpha
- Family: Hipponicidae
- Genus: Hipponix
- Species: H. leptus

Binomial name
- Hipponix leptus Simone, 2002

= Hipponix leptus =

Species of gastropod

Hipponix leptus is a species of small limpet-like sea snail, a marine gastropod mollusk in the family Hipponicidae, the hoof snails. The shell of this species is similar to that of Hipponix antiquatus.

== Distribution ==
Specimens have been found primarily in Brazil.
