= Cheilea cicatricosa =

Scientific classification
- Kingdom: Animalia
- Phylum: Mollusca
- Class: Gastropoda
- Subclass: Caenogastropoda
- Order: Littorinimorpha
- Family: Hipponicidae
- Genus: Cheilea
- Species: C. cicatricosa

Binomial name
- Cheilea cicatricosa (Reeve, 1858)

Species of gastropod

Cheilea cicatricosa is a species of small limpet-like sea snail, a marine gastropod mollusk in the family Hipponicidae, the hoof snails.
