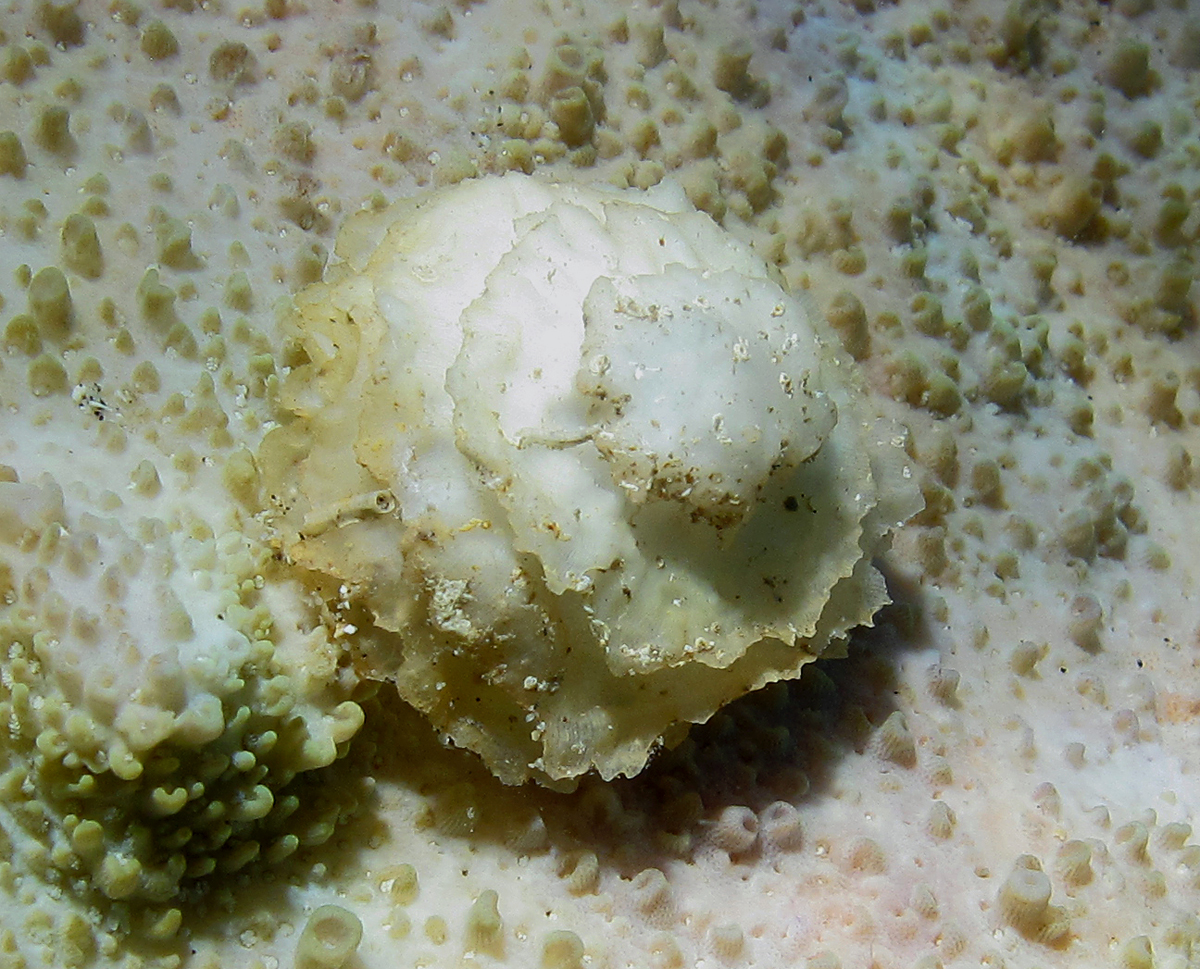

Scientific classification
- Kingdom: Animalia
- Phylum: Mollusca
- Class: Gastropoda
- Subclass: Caenogastropoda
- Order: Littorinimorpha
- Family: Hipponicidae
- Genus: Cheilea
- Species: C. imbricata

Binomial name
- Cheilea imbricata (Fischer von Waldheim, 1807)

Synonyms
- Calyptraea imbricata Fischer von Waldheim, 1807; Calyptraea tectumsinensis Lamarck, 1822; Cheilea tectumsinensis (Lamarck, 1822); Mitrularia tectum-sinense (Lamarck, 1822)

= Cheilea imbricata =

Species of gastropod

Cheilea imbricata is a species of small limpet-like sea snail, a marine gastropod mollusk in the family Hipponicidae, the hoof snails.
