= Hipponix ticaonicus =

Scientific classification
- Kingdom: Animalia
- Phylum: Mollusca
- Class: Gastropoda
- Subclass: Caenogastropoda
- Order: Littorinimorpha
- Family: Hipponicidae
- Genus: Hipponix
- Species: H. ticaonicus

Binomial name
- Hipponix ticaonicus Sowerby II, 1846

Species of gastropod

Hipponix ticaonicus is a species of small limpet-like sea snail, a marine gastropod mollusc in the family Hipponicidae, the hoof snails.

== Description ==
The shell of Hipponix ticaonicus is suborbicular in shape, with closely set radiating striations. It is predominantly whitish in color, with a hairy, pale fulvous epidermis. The shell's vertex is reflexed backward toward the right margin, a distinguishing characteristic of this species.
