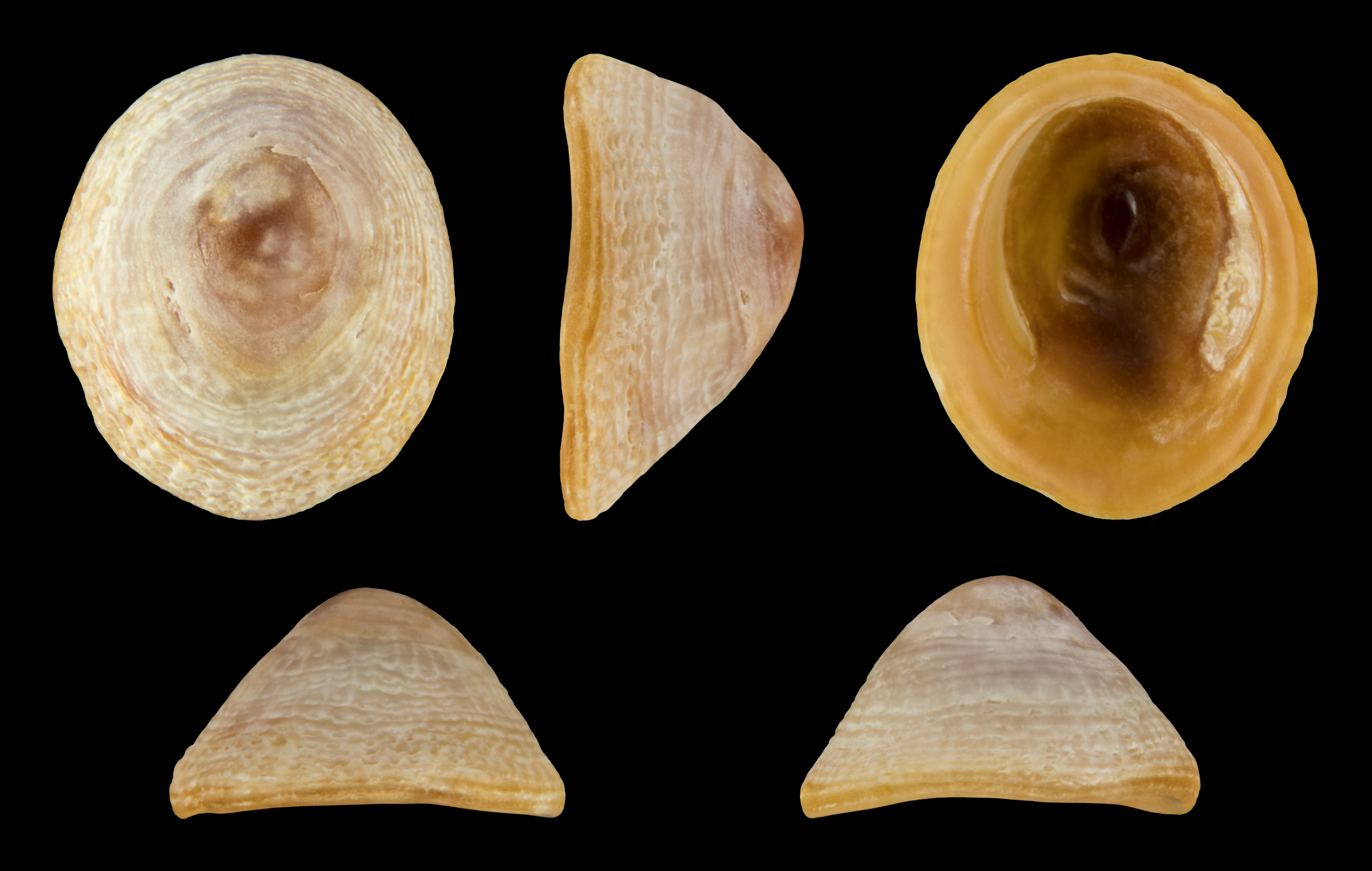

Scientific classification
- Kingdom: Animalia
- Phylum: Mollusca
- Class: Gastropoda
- Subclass: Caenogastropoda
- Order: Littorinimorpha
- Family: Hipponicidae
- Genus: Antisabia
- Species: A. imbricata

Binomial name
- Antisabia imbricata (A.A. Gould, 1846)

= Antisabia imbricata =

Species of sea snail

Antisabia imbricata, commonly known as the tiled hoof shell, is a small marine gastropod mollusk belonging to the family Hipponicidae.

== Distribution ==
This species occurs throughout the Hawaiian Islands, Easter Island, and the Pacific coast from the Gulf of California to the Galápagos Islands and Ecuador.
