= Hipponix climax =

Scientific classification
- Kingdom: Animalia
- Phylum: Mollusca
- Class: Gastropoda
- Subclass: Caenogastropoda
- Order: Littorinimorpha
- Family: Hipponicidae
- Genus: Hipponix
- Species: H. climax

Binomial name
- Hipponix climax Simone, 2005

Species of gastropod

Hipponix climax is a species of small limpet-like sea snail, a marine gastropod mollusk in the family Hipponicidae, the hoof snails.

== Description ==
The maximum recorded shell length is 11 mm.

== Habitat ==
Minimum recorded depth is 240 m. Maximum recorded depth is 260 m.
