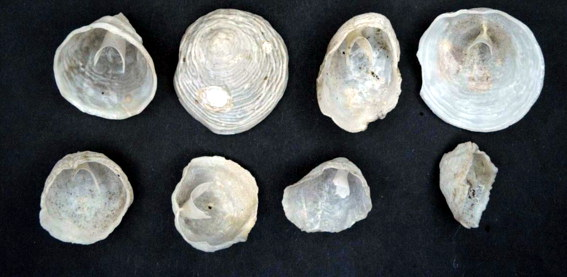
- Shells of Cheilea equestris (museum specimens at Naturalis Biodiversity Center)

Scientific classification
- Kingdom: Animalia
- Phylum: Mollusca
- Class: Gastropoda
- Subclass: Caenogastropoda
- Order: Littorinimorpha
- Family: Hipponicidae
- Genus: Cheilea
- Species: C. equestris

Binomial name
- Cheilea equestris Linnaeus, 1758

Synonyms
- Calyptraea stella Reeve, 1858; Cheila equestris (Linnaeus, 1758); Cheilea papyracea (Reeve, 1858); Cheilea porosa Reeve, 1858; Mitrularia equestris (Linnaeus, 1758); Mitrularia neptuni Schumacher, 1817 (unnecessary substitute name for Cheilea equestris); Patella equestris Linnaeus, 1758 (original combination

= Cheilea equestris =

Species of gastropod

Cheilea equestris is a species of small limpet-like sea snail, a marine gastropod mollusk in the family Hipponicidae, the hoof snails.

The subgenus Cheilea equestris striata Nowell-Usticke, 1959 is a synonym of Cheilea striata Nowell-Usticke, 1959

== Distribution ==
This marine species has a wide distribution: Colombia to Northeast Brazil; Mexico to Chile;in the Indo-Pacific; off Western Africa

== Description ==
The maximum recorded shell length is 38 mm.

== Habitat ==
Minimum recorded depth is 0 m. Maximum recorded depth is 780 m.
