= Hipponix benthophila =

Scientific classification
- Kingdom: Animalia
- Phylum: Mollusca
- Class: Gastropoda
- Subclass: Caenogastropoda
- Order: Littorinimorpha
- Family: Hipponicidae
- Genus: Hipponix
- Species: H. benthophila

Binomial name
- Hipponix benthophila (Dall, 1889)

Species of gastropod

Hipponix benthophila is a species of small limpet-like sea snail, a marine gastropod mollusc in the family Hipponicidae, the hoof snails.

== Description ==
The maximum recorded shell length is 8 mm.

== Habitat ==
Minimum recorded depth is 91 m. Maximum recorded depth is 682 m.
