= Hipponix mogul =

Scientific classification
- Kingdom: Animalia
- Phylum: Mollusca
- Class: Gastropoda
- Subclass: Caenogastropoda
- Order: Littorinimorpha
- Family: Hipponicidae
- Genus: Hipponix
- Species: H. mogul

Binomial name
- Hipponix mogul Chino, 2006

Species of gastropod

Hipponix mogul is a species of small limpet-like sea snail, a marine gastropod mollusk in the family Hipponicidae, the hoof snails.
