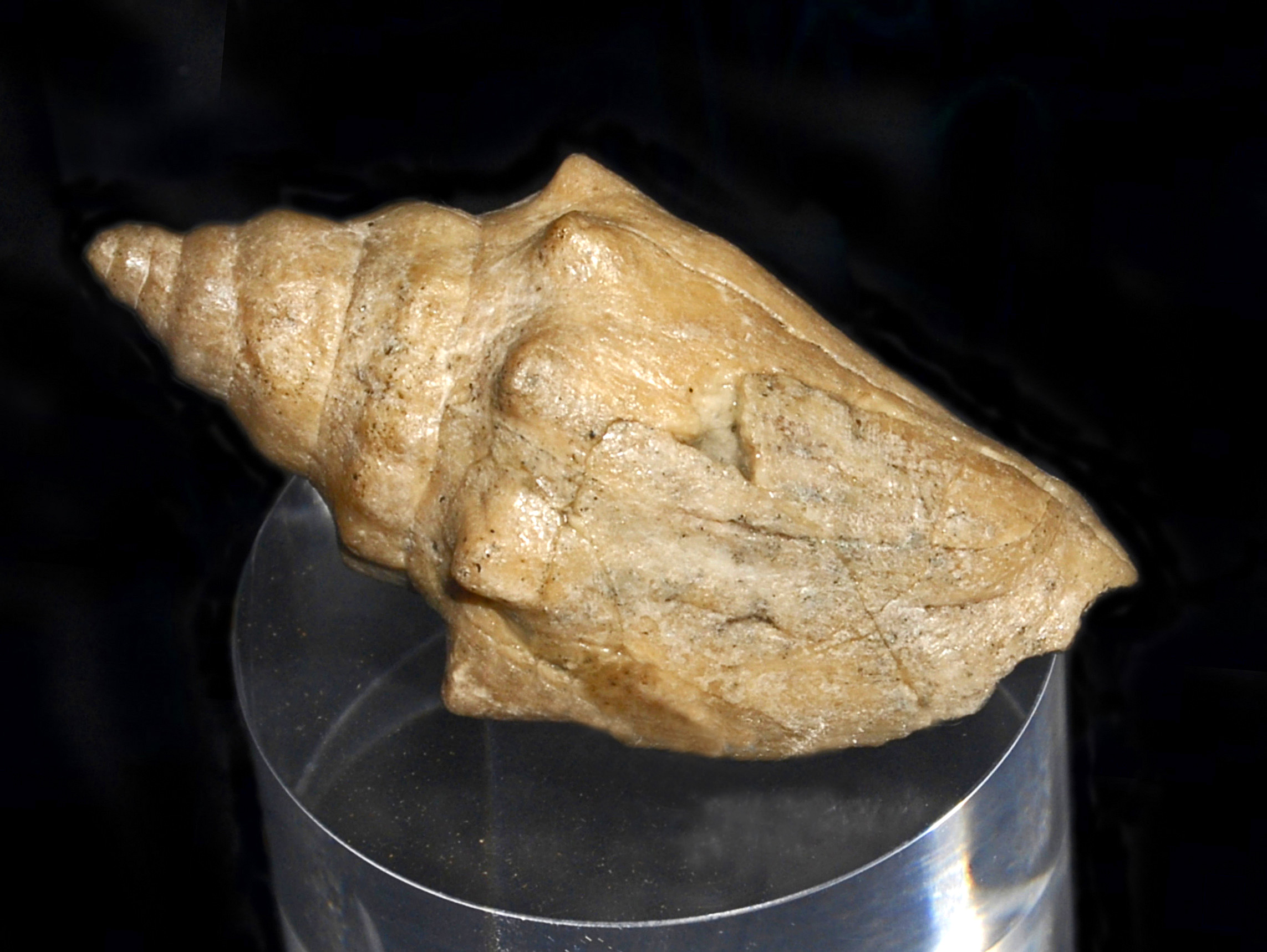
- Persististrombus nodosus

Scientific classification
- Kingdom: Animalia
- Phylum: Mollusca
- Class: Gastropoda
- Subclass: Caenogastropoda
- Order: Littorinimorpha
- Superfamily: Stromboidea
- Family: Strombidae
- Genus: Persististrombus; Kronenberg & Lee, 2007

Type species
- Strombus granulatus Swainson, 1822

Synonyms
- Afristrombus Bandel, 2007; Thetystrombus Dekkers, 2008

= Persististrombus =

Persististrombus Temporal range: Oligocene - Recent

Genus of gastropods

Persististrombus is a genus of sea snails, marine gastropod mollusks in the family Strombidae, the true conchs.

== Fossil record ==
Fossils of Persististrombus are found in marine strata from the Oligocene to the Quaternary (age range: from 28.4 to 0.0 million years ago.). Fossils are known from Europe, North and South America, Algeria, India, Indonesia, Libya, Somalia, Turkey and Iran.

== Species ==
Species within the genus Persististrombus include:

- †Persististrombus lapugyensis-exbonellii
- †Persististrombus aldrichi (Dall, 1890)
- †Persististrombus baltrae (Garcia-Talavera, 1993)
- †Persististrombus barrigonensis (Jung & Heitz, 2001)
- †Persististrombus chipolanus (Dall, 1890)
- †Persististrombus coronatus (DeFrance, 1827)
- Persististrombus granulatus (Swainson, 1822)
- †Persististrombus insulanus (Jung & Heitz, 2001)
- Persististrombus latus (Gmelin, 1791)
- †Persististrombus mardieae (Petuch, 2004)
- †Persististrombus nodosus (S. Borson, 1820)
- †Persististrombus obliteratus (Hanna, 1926)
- †Persististrombus radix (Brongniart, 1823)
- †Persististrombus toroensis (Jung & Heitz, 2001)

== Gallery ==
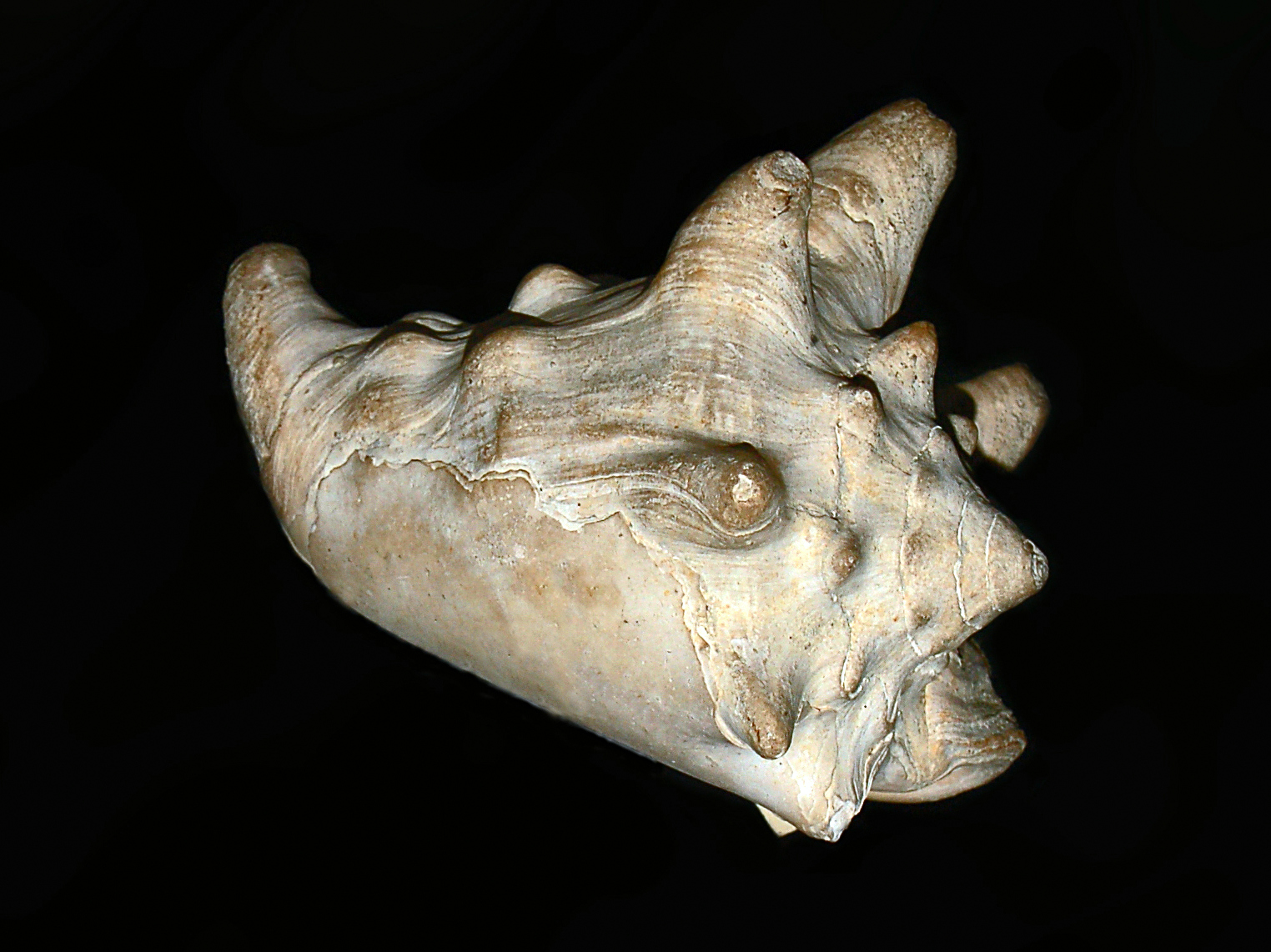
Persististrombus coronatus

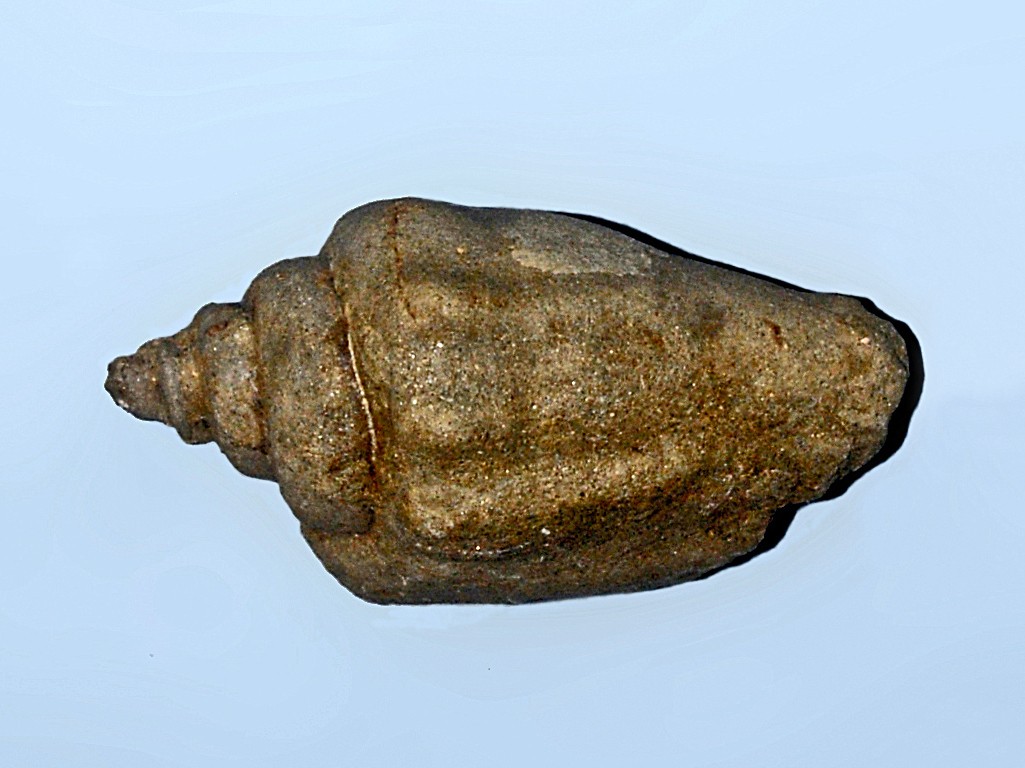
Persististrombus radix

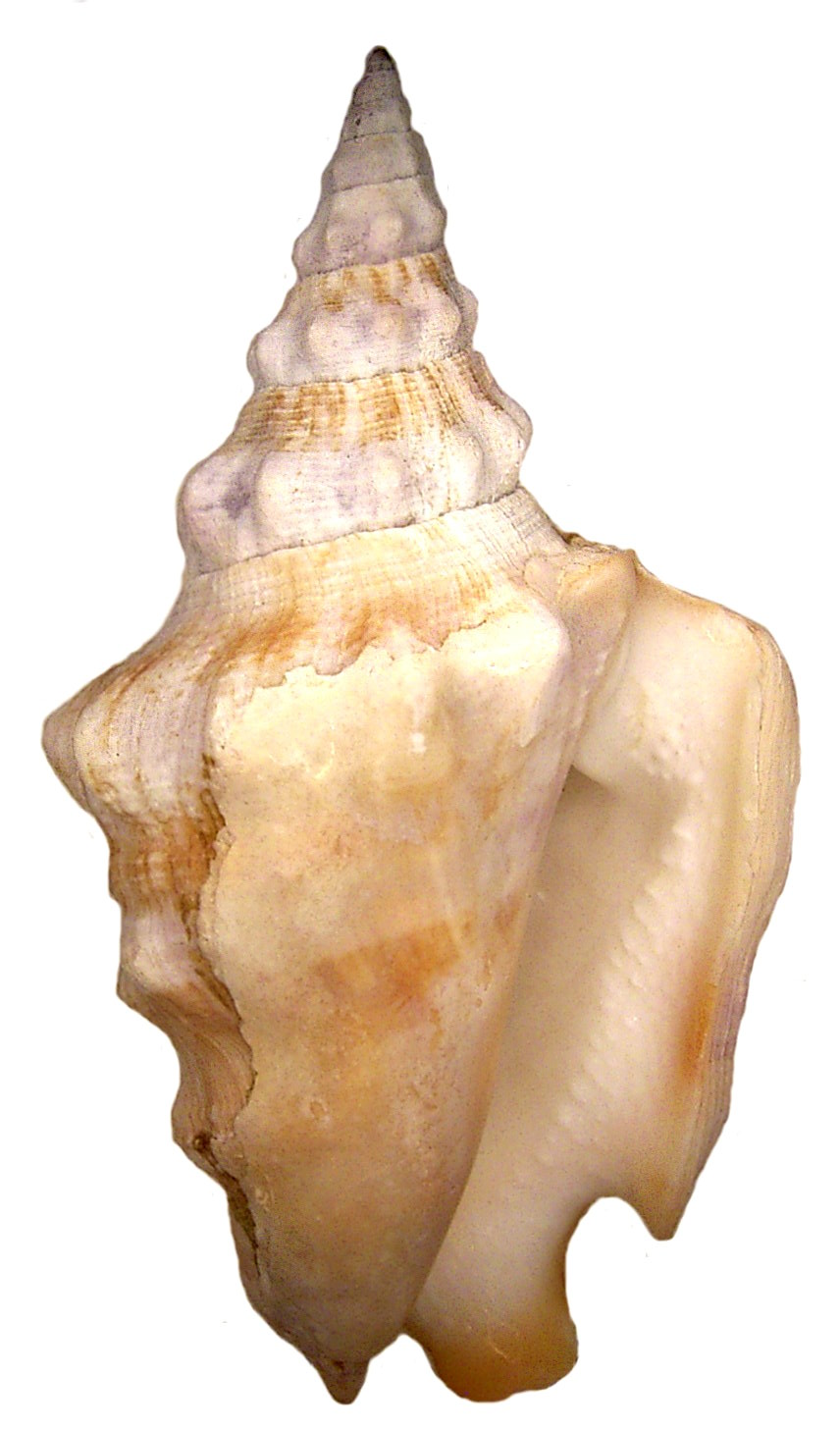
Persististrombus granulatus
