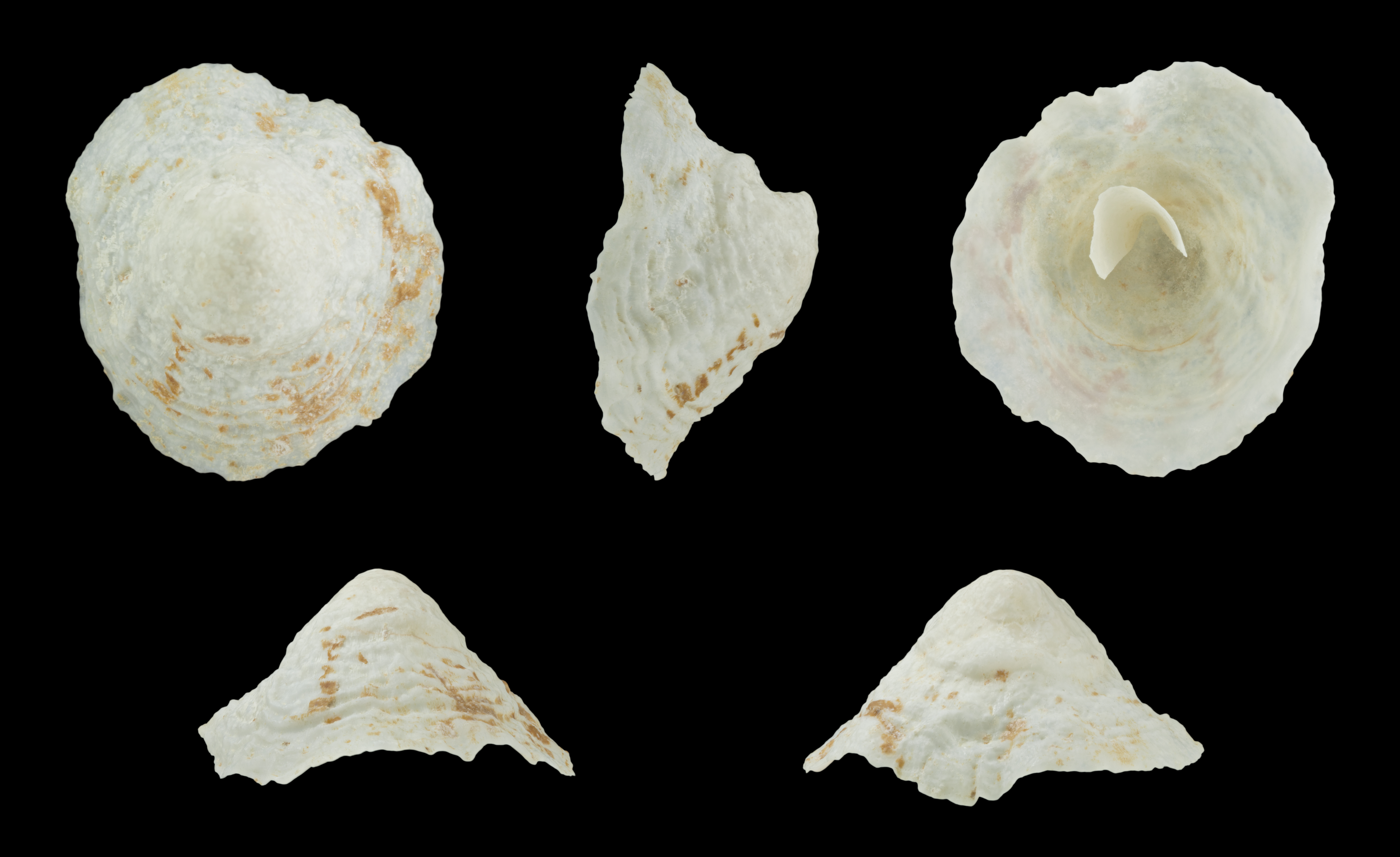

Scientific classification
- Kingdom: Animalia
- Phylum: Mollusca
- Class: Gastropoda
- Subclass: Caenogastropoda
- Order: Littorinimorpha
- Family: Hipponicidae
- Genus: Cheilea
- Species: C. tortilis

Binomial name
- Cheilea tortilis (Reeve, 1858)

= Cheilea tortilis =

Species of gastropod

Cheilea tortilis is a species of small limpet-like sea snail, a marine gastropod mollusk in the family Hipponicidae, the hoof snails.

== Description ==
The length of the shell varies between 30 mm and 65 mm.

== Distribution ==
This marine species occurs in the Red Sea and off Japan and the Philippines.
