= Leptonotis perplexus =

Scientific classification
- Kingdom: Animalia
- Phylum: Mollusca
- Class: Gastropoda
- Subclass: Caenogastropoda
- Order: Littorinimorpha
- Family: Hipponicidae
- Genus: Leptonotis
- Species: L. perplexus

Binomial name
- Leptonotis perplexus (Suter, 1907)

Synonyms
- List: Leptonotis wharekuriensis (Laws, 1935); Neojanacus perplexus Suter, 1907; †Neojanacus wharekuriensis Laws, 1935

Species of gastropod

Leptonotis perplexus is a species of small limpet-like sea snail, a marine gastropod mollusk in the family Hipponicidae, the hoof snails.

== Distribution ==
This marine species is endemic to New Zealand.
