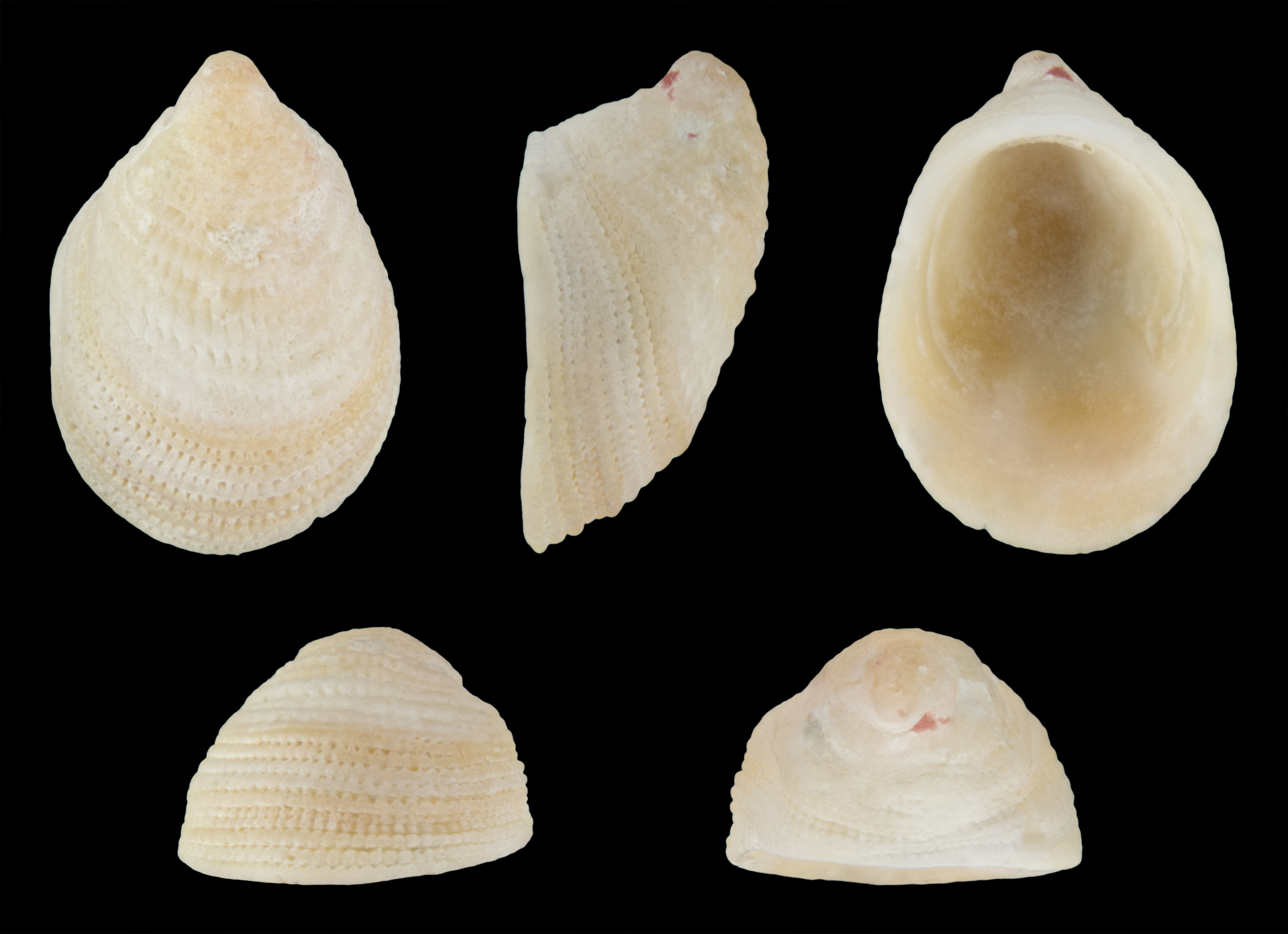

Scientific classification
- Kingdom: Animalia
- Phylum: Mollusca
- Class: Gastropoda
- Subclass: Caenogastropoda
- Order: Littorinimorpha
- Family: Hipponicidae
- Genus: Hipponix
- Species: H. subrufus

Binomial name
- Hipponix subrufus (Lamarck, 1822)

= Hipponix subrufus =

Species of gastropod

Hipponix subrufus is a species of small limpet-like sea snail, a marine gastropod mollusk in the family Hipponicidae, the hoof snails.

== Description ==
The maximum recorded shell length is 13 mm.

== Habitat ==
The minimum recorded depth for this species is 0 m; maximum recorded depth is 780 m.
