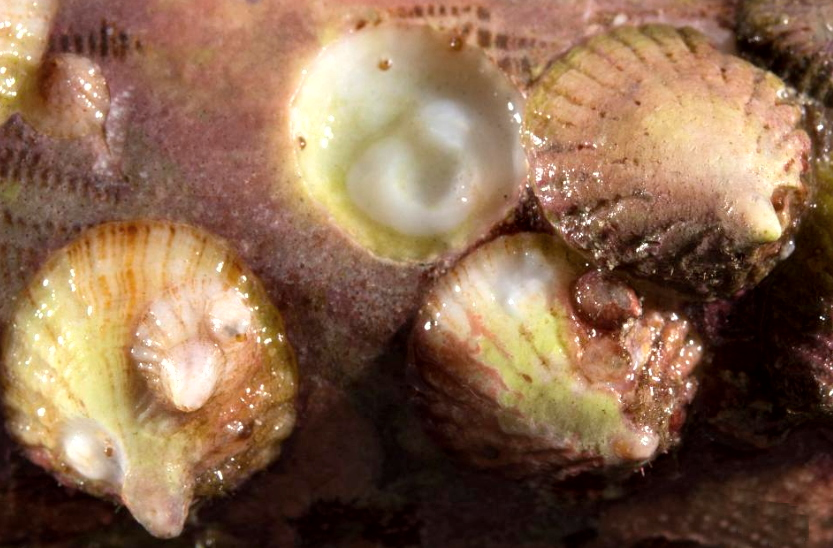
- Shells of Sabia conica

Scientific classification
- Kingdom: Animalia
- Phylum: Mollusca
- Class: Gastropoda
- Subclass: Caenogastropoda
- Order: Littorinimorpha
- Superfamily: Hipponicoidea
- Family: Hipponicidae
- Genus: Sabia; Gray, 1841

Type species
- Calyptraea lithedaphus Reeve, 1842

Synonyms
- Amalthea Schumacher, 1817

= Sabia (gastropod) =

Genus of gastropods

Sabia is a genus of small sea snails, limpet-like marine gastropod molluscs in the family Hipponicidae, the hoof shells or hoof snails.

== Species ==
Species within the genus Sabia include:

- Sabia australis Lamarck, 1819
- Sabia conica (Schumacher, 1817)
- Sabia lithedaphus (Reeve, 1842)

Synonyms

- Sabia prionocidaricola Habe & Kanazawa, 1991 (synonym of Hipponix prionocidaricola Habe & Kanazawa, 1991): synonym of Hipponix prionocidaricola (Habe & Kanazawa, 1991) (original combination)
- Sabia wyattae Powell, 1958: synonym of Sabia conica (Schumacher, 1817)

According to Gastropods.com, the following species also belong to the genus Sabia :

- Sabia affine (Jeffreys, 1883)
- Sabia erma (Cotton, B.C., 1939) (taxon inquirendum)
