= Leptonotis boucheti =

Scientific classification
- Kingdom: Animalia
- Phylum: Mollusca
- Class: Gastropoda
- Subclass: Caenogastropoda
- Order: Littorinimorpha
- Family: Hipponicidae
- Genus: Leptonotis
- Species: L. boucheti

Binomial name
- Leptonotis boucheti (Riedel F., 2000)

Synonyms
- Neojanacus boucheti Riedel F., 2000

Species of gastropod

Leptonotis boucheti is a species of small limpet-like sea snail, a marine gastropod mollusk in the family Hipponicidae, the hoof snails.
