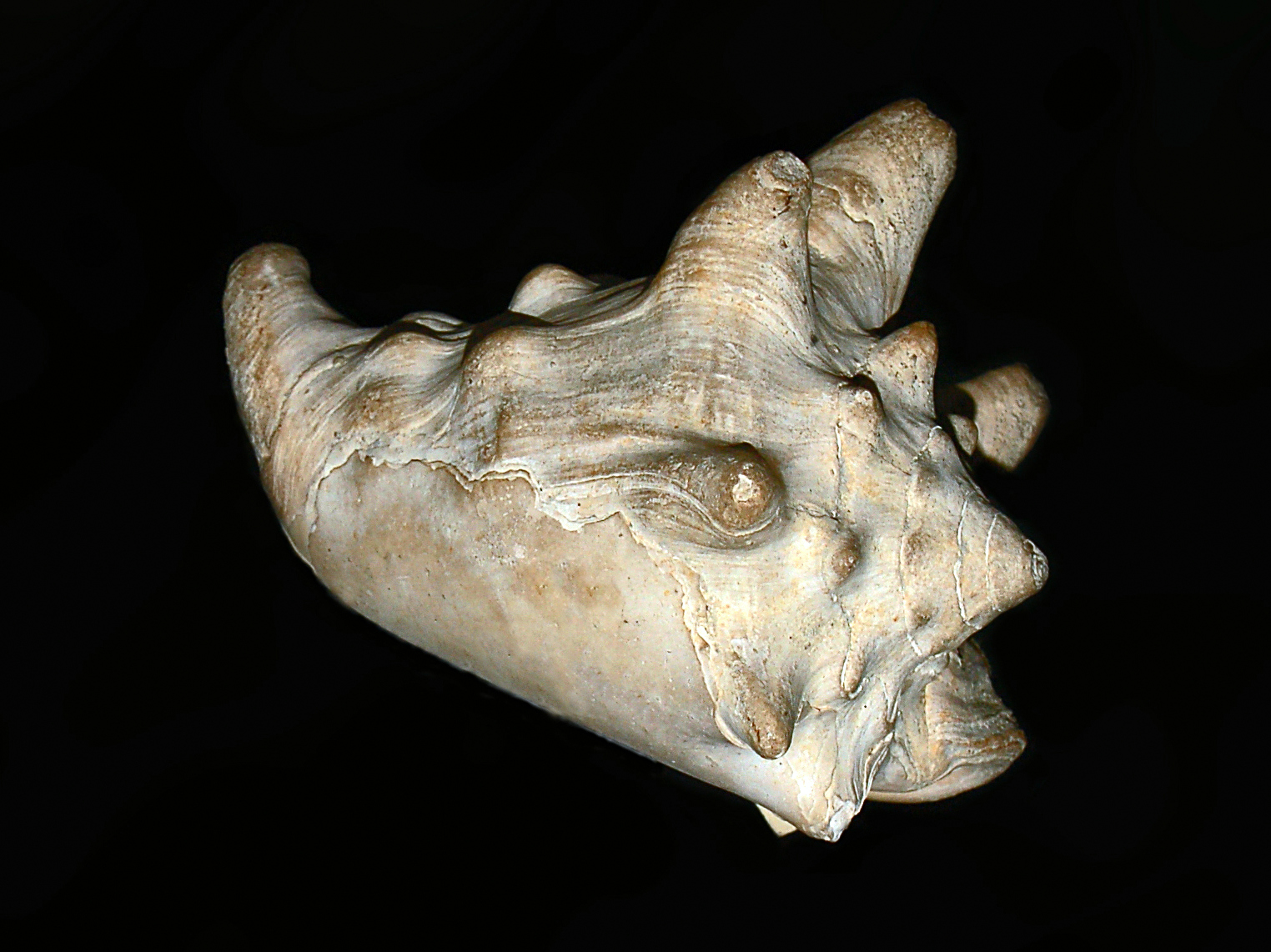
- A view of the fossil shell of Persististrombus coronatus, Pliocene from Alessandria (Italy)

Scientific classification
- Kingdom: Animalia
- Phylum: Mollusca
- Class: Gastropoda
- Subclass: Caenogastropoda
- Order: Littorinimorpha
- Family: Strombidae
- Genus: Persististrombus
- Species: †P. coronatus

Binomial name
- †Persististrombus coronatus (DeFrance, 1827)

Synonyms
- Strombus coronatus DeFrance, 1827; Strombus costatus; Strombus fasciatus (Brocchi, 1814); Strombus italicus (Brocchi, 1825)

= Persististrombus coronatus =

Persististrombus coronatus Temporal range: Tortonian - Piacenzian

Extinct species of gastropod

Persististrombus coronatus is an extinct species of fossil true conch from the Late Miocene to Pliocene (11.6-2.58 million years ago).

== Description ==
Persististrombus coronatus has a shell reaching a length of 100–120 millimetres (3.9–4.7 in), but some specimen may attain sizes up to 155 millimetres (6.1 in). The large-sized light brown shells are heavy, very thick at the right edge, and show long protuberances. These molluscs were epifaunal omnivore-grazers. They lived in shallow water on sandy seabeds, in warm and tropical seas.

In the Miocene, the species is a West Atlantic element, which later invaded the Mediterranean region. It disappears from the Mediterranean Sea completely with the onset of the Late Pliocene cooling.

== Distribution ==
During the early Pliocene warming, the species is recorded from Portugal, Spain, France, Italy, Greece, Turkey, Syria, Libya, Tunisia, Morocco and the Canary Islands. It is also present in the Miocene of Algeria, Greece, Libya, Romania, Somalia and Austria. It was also recorded from the Lower Pliocene of the Azores (Santa Maria Island).
