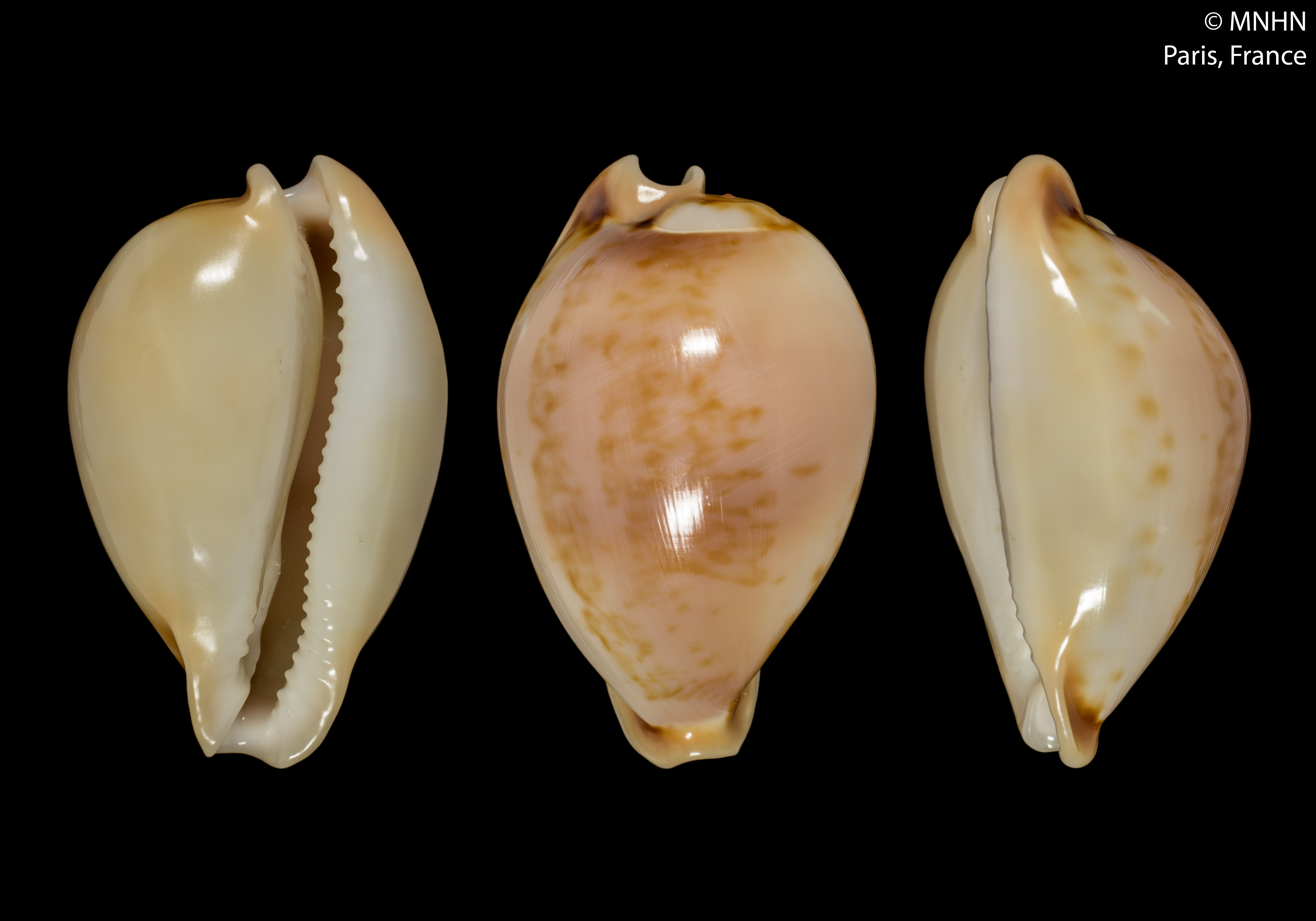
- Shell of Nesiocypraea teramachii polyphemus (holotype at MNHN, Paris)

Scientific classification
- Kingdom: Animalia
- Phylum: Mollusca
- Class: Gastropoda
- Subclass: Caenogastropoda
- Order: Littorinimorpha
- Family: Cypraeidae
- Genus: Nesiocypraea
- Species: N. teramachii

Binomial name
- Nesiocypraea teramachii (Kuroda, 1938)

Synonyms
- Cypraea teramachii (Kuroda, 1938); Erronea teramachii Kuroda, 1938 (original combination); Nesiocypraea teramachii teramachii (Kuroda, 1938)· accepted, alternate representation

= Nesiocypraea teramachii =

Species of gastropod

Nesiocypraea teramachii is a species of sea snail, a cowry, a marine gastropod mollusc in the family Cypraeidae, the cowries.

Subspecies

- Nesiocypraea teramachii neocaledonica Lorenz, 2002
- Nesiocypraea teramachii polyphemus Lorenz, 2002

== Distribution ==
This marine species occurs off the Philippines.
