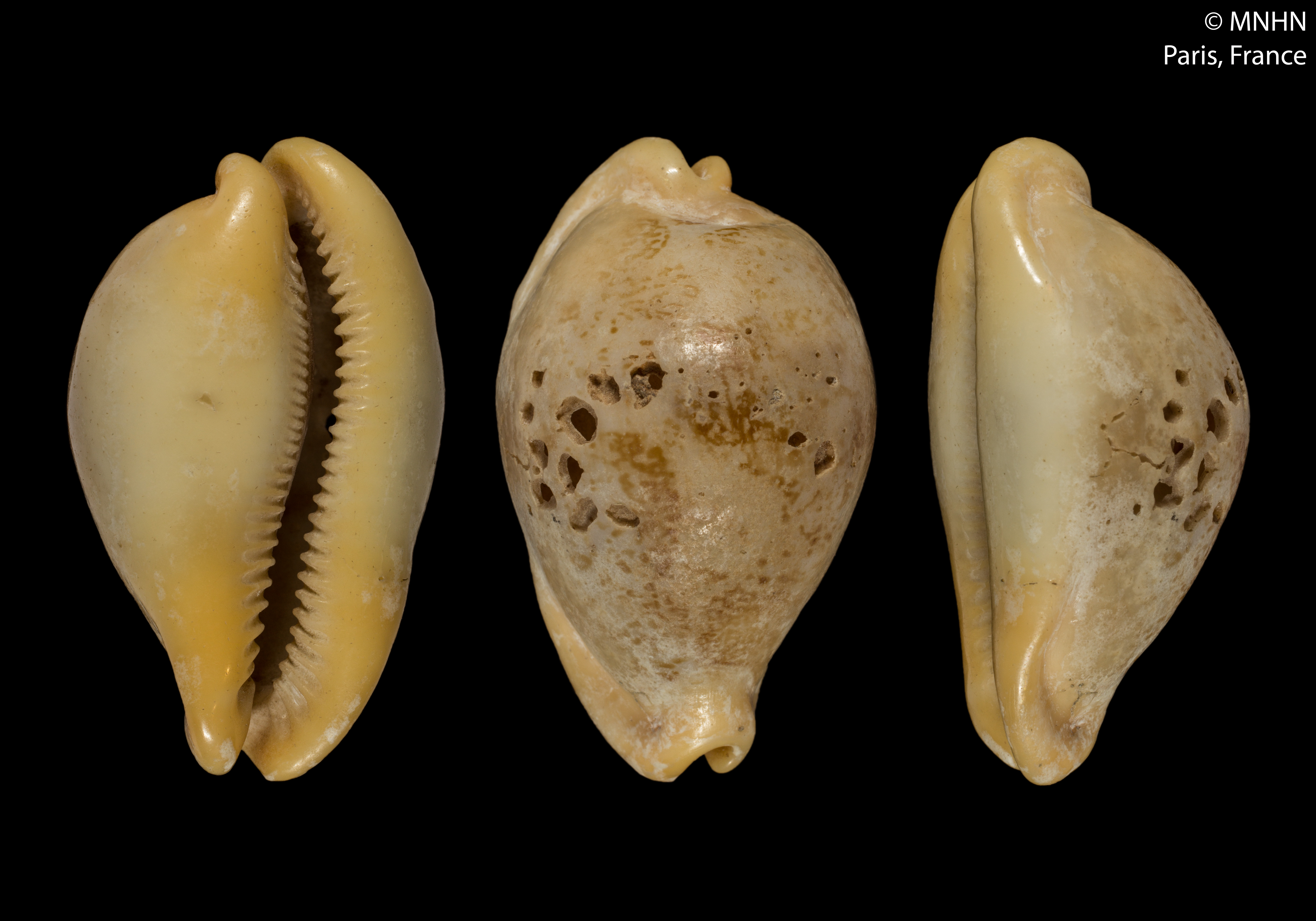
- Austrasiatica deforgesi

Scientific classification
- Kingdom: Animalia
- Phylum: Mollusca
- Class: Gastropoda
- Subclass: Caenogastropoda
- Order: Littorinimorpha
- Superfamily: Cypraeoidea
- Family: Cypraeidae
- Genus: Austrasiatica; Lorenz, 1989

Type species
- Schilderia sakuraii Habe, 1970

= Austrasiatica =

Genus of gastropods

Austrasiatica is a genus of sea snails, marine gastropod mollusks in the family Cypraeidae, the cowries.

== Species ==
Species within the genus Austrasiatica include:

- Austrasiatica alexhuberti Lorenz and Huber, 2000
- Austrasiatica deforgesi Lorenz, 2002
- Austrasiatica hirasei (Roberts, 1913)
- Austrasiatica langfordi (Kuroda, 1938)
- Austrasiatica sakurai (Habe, 1970)

Species brought into synonymy

- Austrasiatica sakurai [sic]: synonym of Austrasiatica sakuraii (Habe, 1970) (misspelling)
