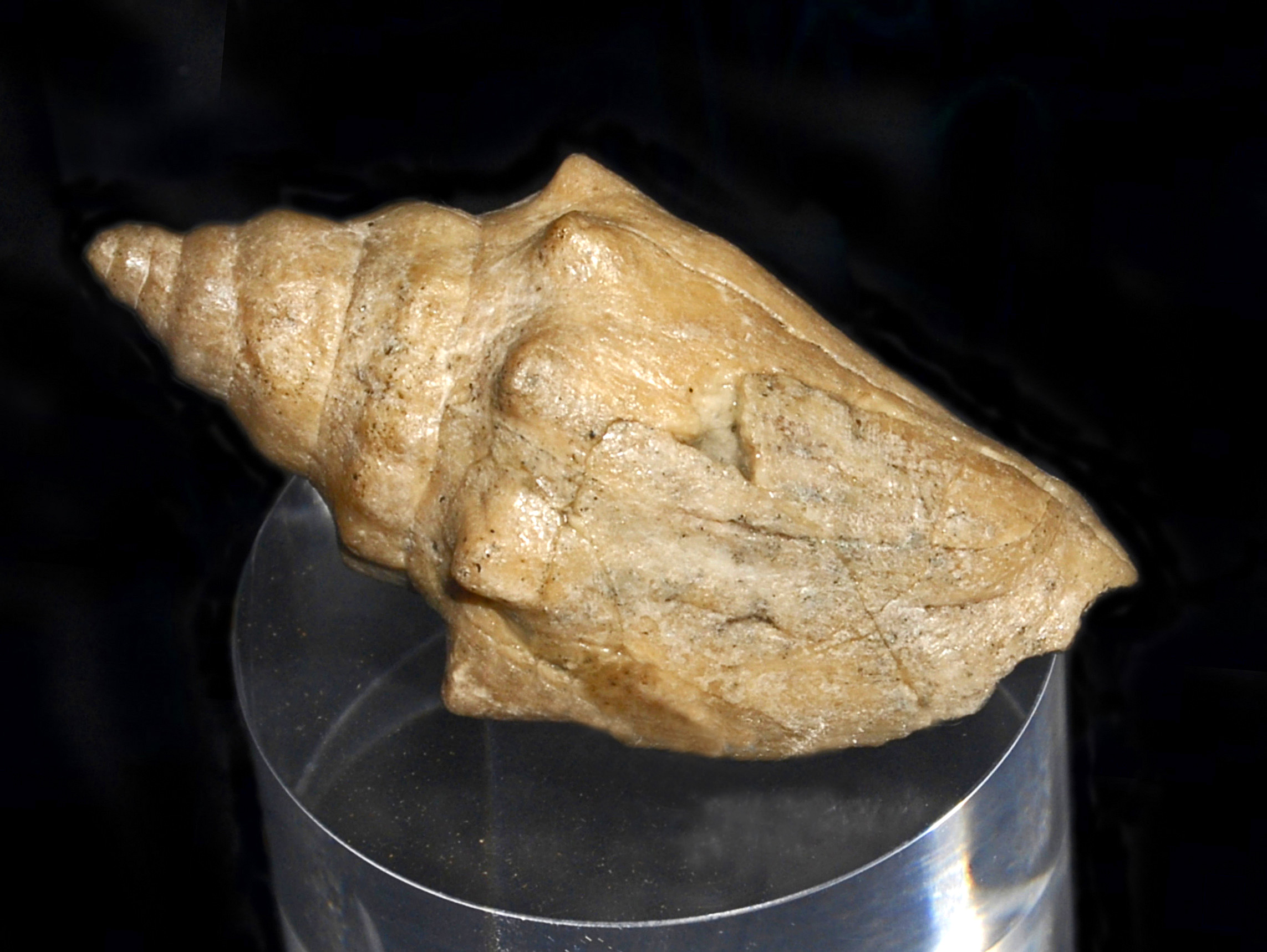
- A view of the fossil shell of Persististrombus nodosus

Scientific classification
- Kingdom: Animalia
- Phylum: Mollusca
- Class: Gastropoda
- Subclass: Caenogastropoda
- Order: Littorinimorpha
- Family: Strombidae
- Genus: Persististrombus
- Species: †P. nodosus

Binomial name
- †Persististrombus nodosus (S. Borson, 1820)

Synonyms
- Persististrombus bonellii Brongniart, 1823

= Persististrombus nodosus =

Persististrombus nodosus Temporal range: Miocene

Extinct species of gastropod

Persististrombus nodosus is an extinct species of fossil sea snail, a marine gastropod mollusk in the family Strombidae, the conchs.

== Description ==
Persististrombus nodosus is quite polymorphic, but it is usually slender with high spire. Spire whorls show strong nodes or spines. The sutural ramp and the last whorl bear spiral ribs, quite variable in number and strength. The surface of the last whorl is crumpled., with a slightly concave area.

== Fossil record ==
Fossils of Persististrombus nodosus are found in marine strata of the Miocene (age range: from 20.43 to 7.246 million years ago.). Fossils are known from Austria, France, Greece, Italy, Poland and Turkey.
