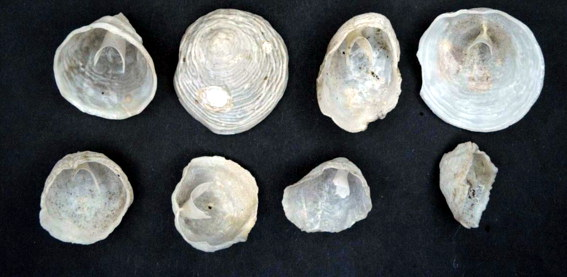
- Cheilea equestris (Linnaeus, 1758); family Hipponicidae

Scientific classification
- Kingdom: Animalia
- Phylum: Mollusca
- Class: Gastropoda
- Subclass: Caenogastropoda
- Order: Littorinimorpha
- Family: Hipponicidae
- Genus: Cheilea; Modeer, 1793

Type species
- Patella equestris Linnaeus, 1758

Synonyms
- Cheila (incorrect subsequent spelling); Mitrularia Schumacher, 1817

= Cheilea =

Genus of gastropods

Cheilea is a genus of small limpet-like sea snails, marine gastropod mollusks in the family Hipponicidae, the hoof snails.

== Species ==
Species within the genus Cheilea include:

- Cheilea africana Rolán & Fernández-Garcés, 2014
- Cheilea americana Rolán, Redfern & Fernández-Garcés, 2014
- Cheilea atlantica Rolán, Leal & Fernández-Garcés, 2014
- Cheilea cepacea (Broderip, 1834)
- Cheilea cicatricosa (Reeve, 1858)
- Cheilea corrugata (Broderip, 1834)
- Cheilea dormitoria (Reeve, 1858)
- Cheilea equestris (Linnaeus, 1758)
- Cheilea hipponiciformis (Reeve, 1858)
- Cheilea imbricata (Fischer von Waldheim, 1807)
- † Cheilea janitrix Maxwell, 1966
- Cheilea microstriata Barnard, 1963
- † Cheilea plumea Laws, 1932
- † Cheilea postera Laws, 1936
- Cheilea scutulum (Reeve, 1858)
- Cheilea striata Nowell-Usticke, 1959
- Cheilea tortilis (Reeve, 1858)
- Cheilea uncinata (Reeve, 1858)
- Cheilea undulata (Röding, 1798)

Species brought into synonymy

- Cheilea papyracea: synonym of Cheilea equestris (Linnaeus, 1758)
- Cheilea porosa Reeve, 1858 : synonym of Cheilea equestris (Linnaeus, 1758)
