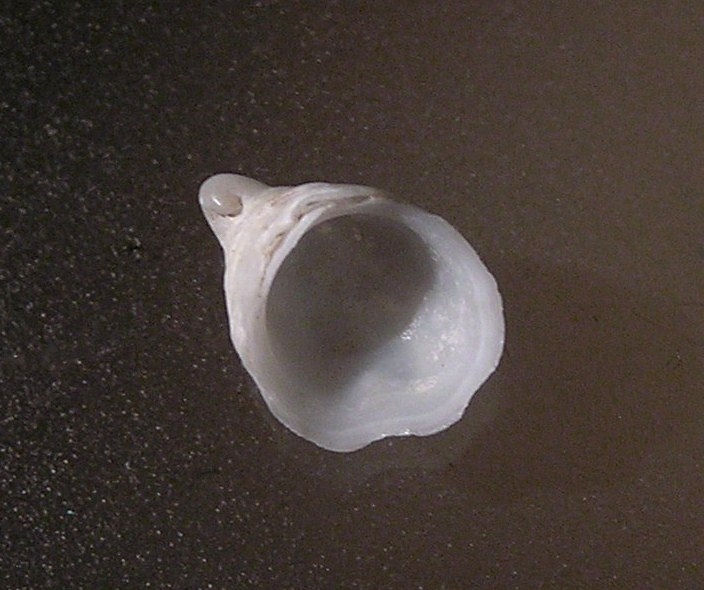
- A shell of Malluvium otohimae

Scientific classification
- Kingdom: Animalia
- Phylum: Mollusca
- Class: Gastropoda
- Subclass: Caenogastropoda
- Order: Littorinimorpha
- Family: Hipponicidae
- Genus: Malluvium; Melvill, 1906

Type species
- Capulus lissus E. A. Smith, 1894

Species
- See text

Synonyms
- Amalthea (Malluvium) Melvill, 1906

= Malluvium =

Genus of gastropods

Malluvium is a genus of small sea snails, limpet-like cap snails, marine gastropod molluscs in the family Hipponicidae, the hoofshells or hoof snails.

== Description ==
(Original description in Latin) This genus is distinguished from Amalthea typica by its completely smooth surface. They are sometimes white, sometimes marked with two or three longitudinal cinnamon or chestnut rays. The aperture is oval or circular and whitish within, with a thin margin and a thin to solid basal lamina.

== Species ==
Species within the genus Malluvium include:

- Malluvium calcareum (Suter, 1909)
- Malluvium devotum (Hedley, 1904)
- Malluvium lissum (E. A. Smith, 1894)
