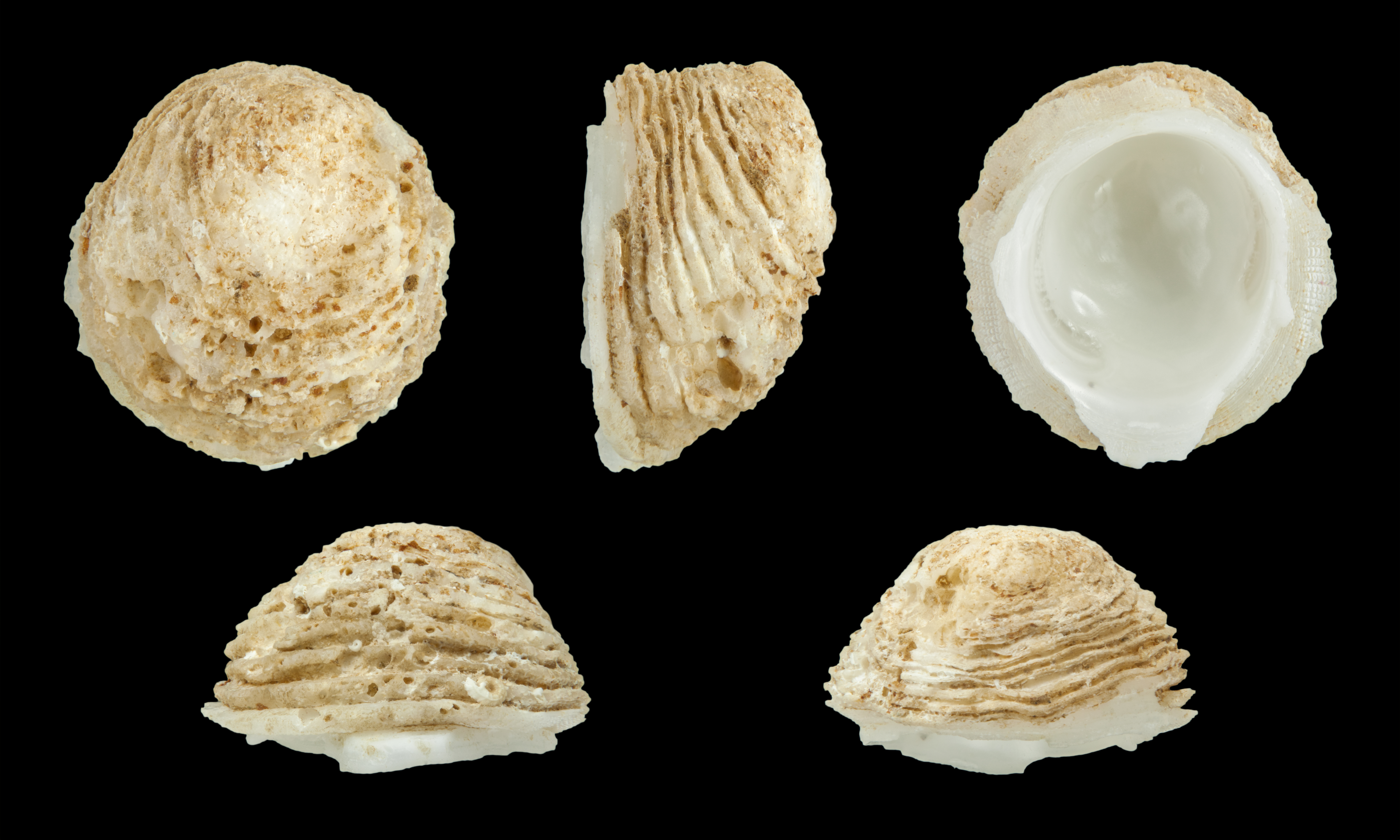
- Hipponix antiquatus shell

Scientific classification
- Kingdom: Animalia
- Phylum: Mollusca
- Class: Gastropoda
- Subclass: Caenogastropoda
- Order: Littorinimorpha
- Family: Hipponicidae
- Genus: Hipponix
- Species: H. antiquatus

Binomial name
- Hipponix antiquatus (Linnaeus, 1767)

= Hipponix antiquatus =

Species of gastropod

Hipponix antiquatus is a species of small limpet-like sea snail, a marine gastropod mollusk in the family Hipponicidae, the hoof snails.

== Description ==
The maximum recorded shell length is 20 mm.

== Habitat ==
Minimum recorded depth is 0 m. Maximum recorded depth is 525 m.
