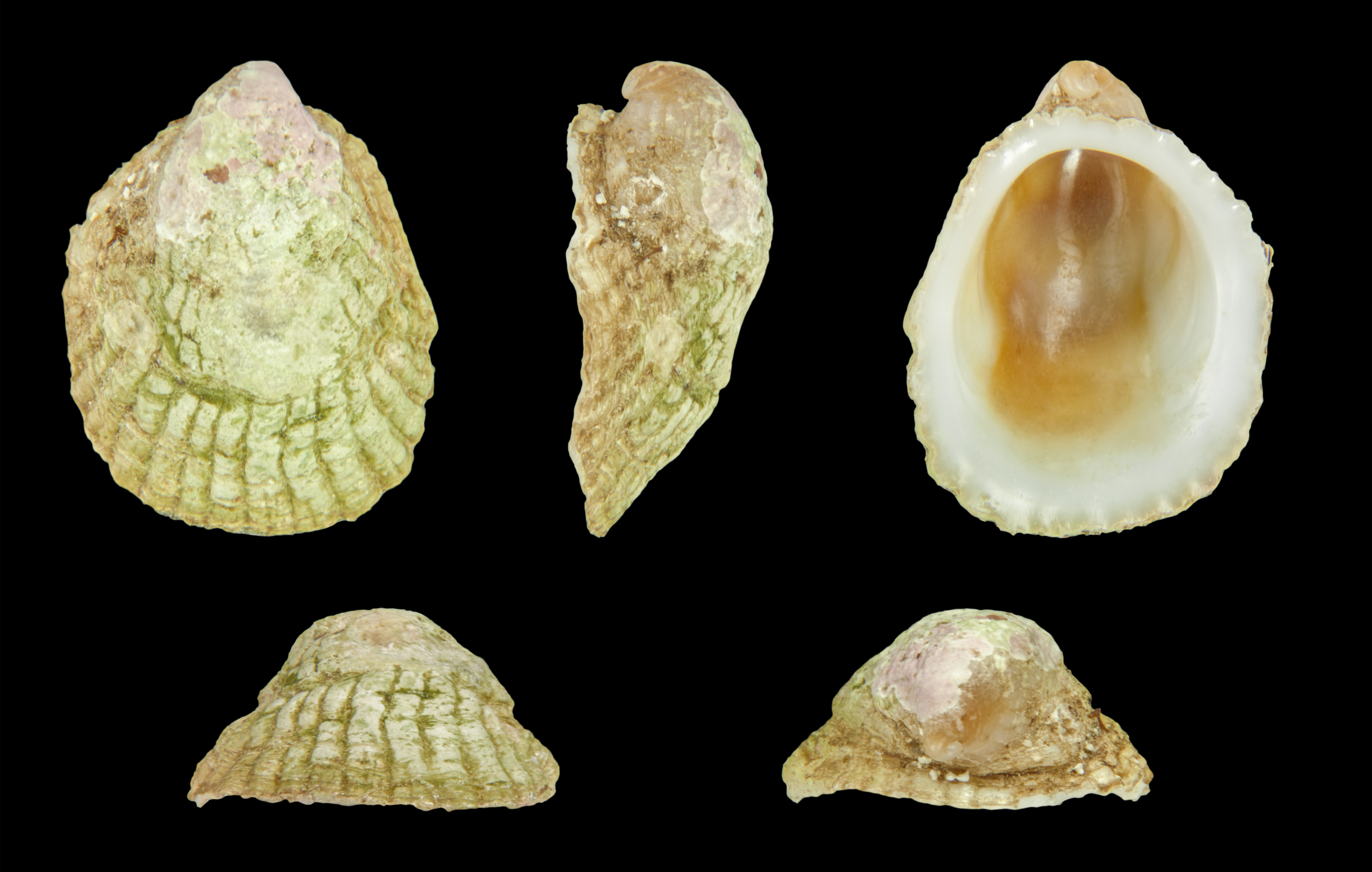

Scientific classification
- Domain: Eukaryota
- Kingdom: Animalia
- Phylum: Mollusca
- Class: Gastropoda
- Subclass: Caenogastropoda
- Order: Littorinimorpha
- Family: Hipponicidae
- Genus: Sabia
- Species: S. australis

Binomial name
- Sabia australis (Lamarck, 1819)

Synonyms
- Hipponix australis (Lamarck, 1819)

= Sabia australis =

Species of gastropod

Sabia australis is a small limpet-like species of sea snail, belonging to the marine gastropod family Hipponicidae, also known as hoof snails.

== Description ==
Sabia australis typically possesses a conical shell, with colors ranging from white to yellow or orange. The surface of its shell is usually rough and textured, providing protection against environmental circumstances and serving as camouflage against predators. The size of its shell varies depending on factors such as age and environmental conditions, but typically reaches up to 30 millimeters in length.

== Reproduction ==
Sabia australis exhibits protandric hermaphroditism. Female Sabia australis lay up to 10 eggs, primarily during winter, each egg containing 9 to 24 embryos that hatch into crawling juveniles. These juveniles then drift or swim to find a host to settle on, often clustering on a single host. Sabia australis is a bisexual species, with its sexual development influenced by the proximity of conspecifics. For example, if it settles on a host alone, it quickly develops into a female, with its male phase being very short or nonexistent. However, if it settles next to a female, it develops into a male and lives on the back of a female.

== Diet ==
Sabia australis inhabits the shells of other mollusks and feeds on their fecal pellets. It typically positions itself on the shell area with direct access to its host's excretions.

== Distribution ==
This species is native to southeastern and southwestern Australia, including New South Wales, Tasmania, Victoria, Southern Australia, and Western Australia, where it is widespread and common. It is widespread and commonly found in Tasmanian waters. Sabia australis is considered cryptogenic to O'ahu, Hawai'i.

== Habitat ==
Sabia australis is found in the intertidal zone and shallow waters.
