= Leptonotis =

Scientific classification
- Kingdom: Animalia
- Phylum: Mollusca
- Class: Gastropoda
- Subclass: Caenogastropoda
- Order: Littorinimorpha
- Family: Hipponicidae
- Genus: Leptonotis; Conrad, 1866

Synonyms
- Neojanacus Suter, 1907

Genus of gastropods

Leptonotis is a genus of small, limpet-like sea snails, marine gastropod mollusks in the family Hipponicidae, the hoof snails.

== Species ==
The following species are recognised in the genus Leptonotis:

- Leptonotis boucheti (F. Riedel, 2000)
- Leptonotis expansus (Whitfield, 1865) †
- Leptonotis fossilis (Tate, 1898) †
- Leptonotis kaawaensis (Bartrum & Powell, 1928) †
- Leptonotis opercularis (Deshayes, 1824) †
- Leptonotis perplexus (Suter, 1907)
- Leptonotis planus (Dockery, 1984) †
- Leptonotis squamaeformis (Lamarck, 1803) †
