= Nesiocypraea aenigma =

Scientific classification
- Kingdom: Animalia
- Phylum: Mollusca
- Class: Gastropoda
- Subclass: Caenogastropoda
- Order: Littorinimorpha
- Family: Cypraeidae
- Genus: Nesiocypraea
- Species: N. aenigma

Binomial name
- Nesiocypraea aenigma Lorenz, 2002

Species of gastropod

Nesiocypraea aenigma is a species of sea snail, a cowry, a marine gastropod mollusc in the family Cypraeidae, the cowries.
