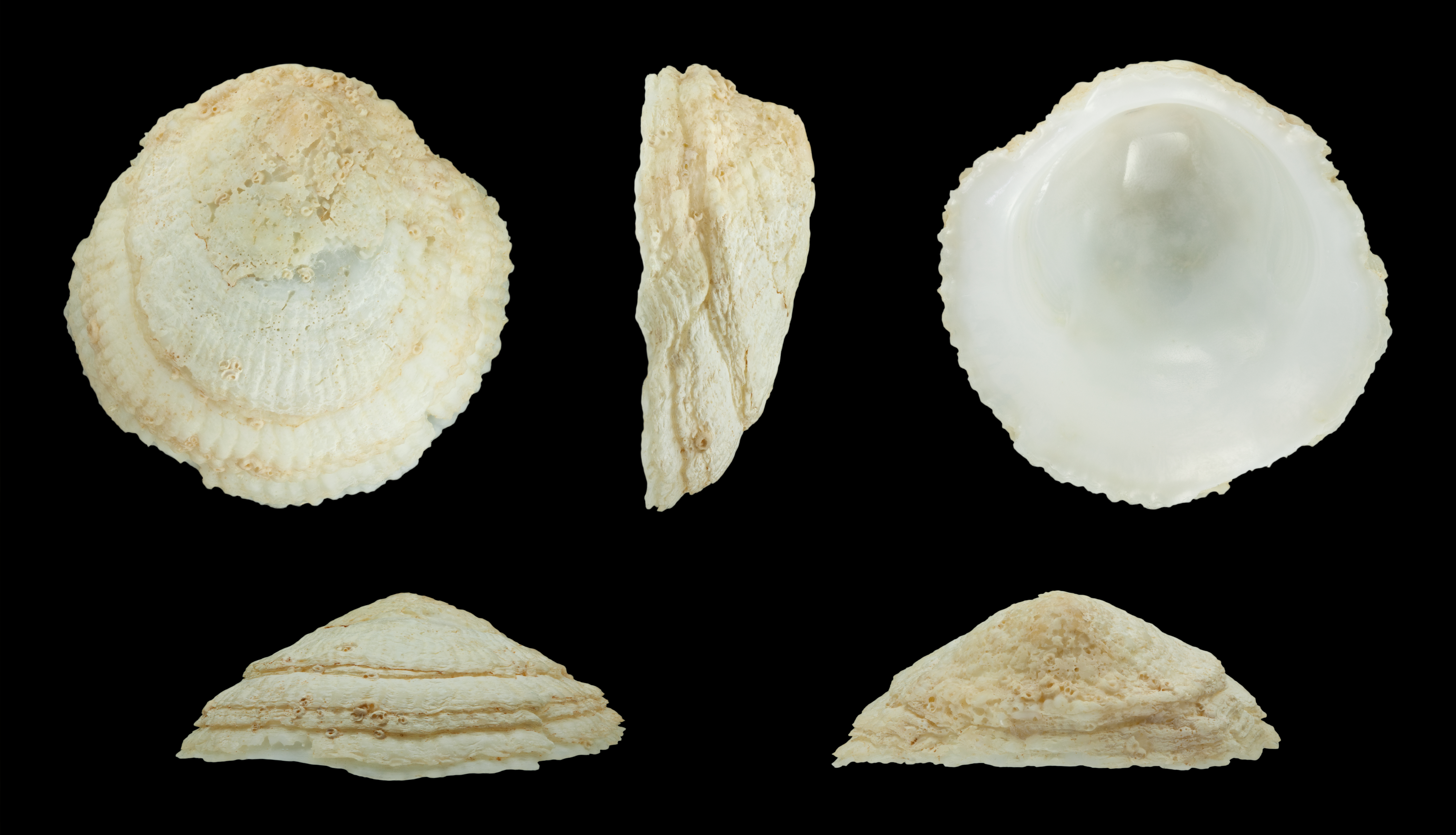
- Antisabia foliacea

Scientific classification
- Kingdom: Animalia
- Phylum: Mollusca
- Class: Gastropoda
- Subclass: Caenogastropoda
- Order: Littorinimorpha
- Family: Hipponicidae
- Genus: Antisabia; Iredale, 1937

Species
- See text

= Antisabia =

Genus of gastropods

Antisabia, common name hoof shells or hoof snails, is a genus of small sea snails, limpet-like marine gastropod molluscs in the family Hipponicidae.

== Distribution ==
This genus is distributed worldwide in warm seas.

== Description ==
The sedentary species in this genus live on the underside of stones or commensally with their shells loosely attached to other and larger gastropods or invertebrates. This commensalism results in some morphological changes : a thin basal plate, a very long snout and a small osphradium. They live in colonies with a few big females are surrounded by many smaller males. The egg mass is kept within the female shell. When the eggs hatch, a few young escape at the crawling stage.

== Genera ==
Genera within the genus Antisabia include:

- Antisabia erma (Cotton, 1938)
- Antisabia foliacea (Quoy & Gaimard, 1835)
- Antisabia imbricata Gould, 1846
- Antisabia juliae Poulicek, Bussers & Vandewalle, 1996
