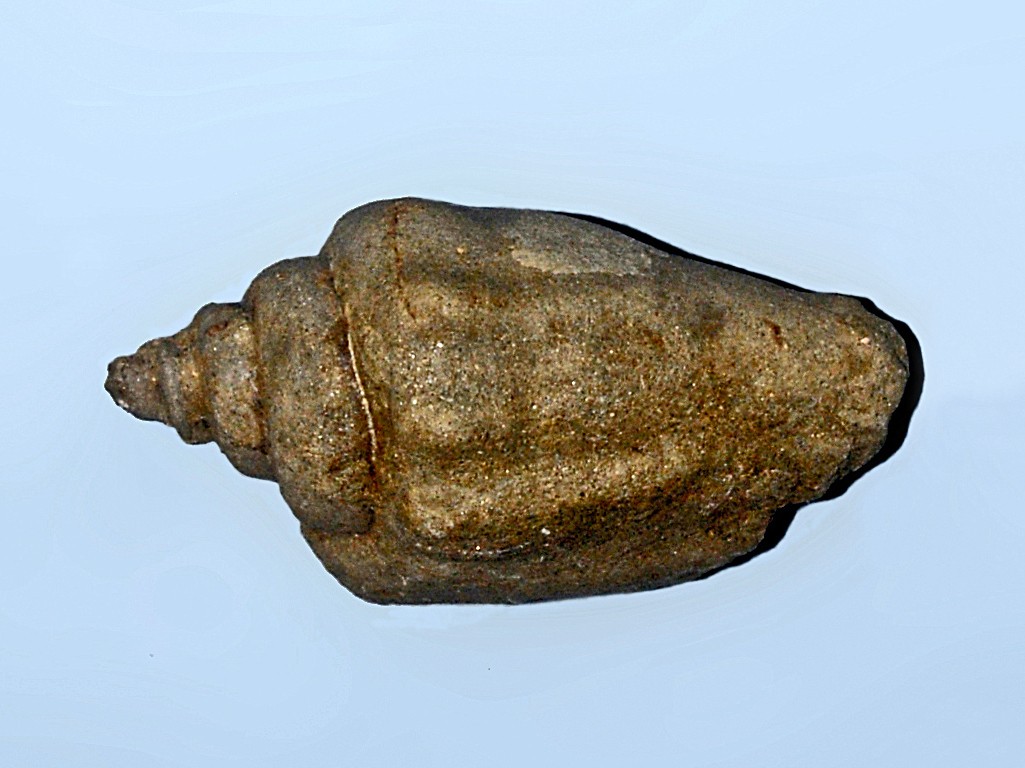
- A view of the fossil shell of Persististrombus radix

Scientific classification
- Kingdom: Animalia
- Phylum: Mollusca
- Class: Gastropoda
- Subclass: Caenogastropoda
- Order: Littorinimorpha
- Family: Strombidae
- Genus: Persististrombus
- Species: †P. radix

Binomial name
- †Persististrombus radix (Brongniart, 1823)

Synonyms
- Strombus rugifer Fuchs, 1870; Strombus vialensis Fuchs, 1870

= Persististrombus radix =

Persististrombus radix Temporal range: Oligocene

Extinct species of gastropod

Persististrombus radix is an extinct species of fossil sea snail, a marine gastropod mollusk in the family Strombidae, the conchs.

== Fossil record ==
Fossils of Persististrombus radix are found in marine strata of the Oligocene (age range: from 28.4 to 23.03 million years ago.). Fossils are known from Bulgaria, France, Greece, India, Iran and Somalia.
