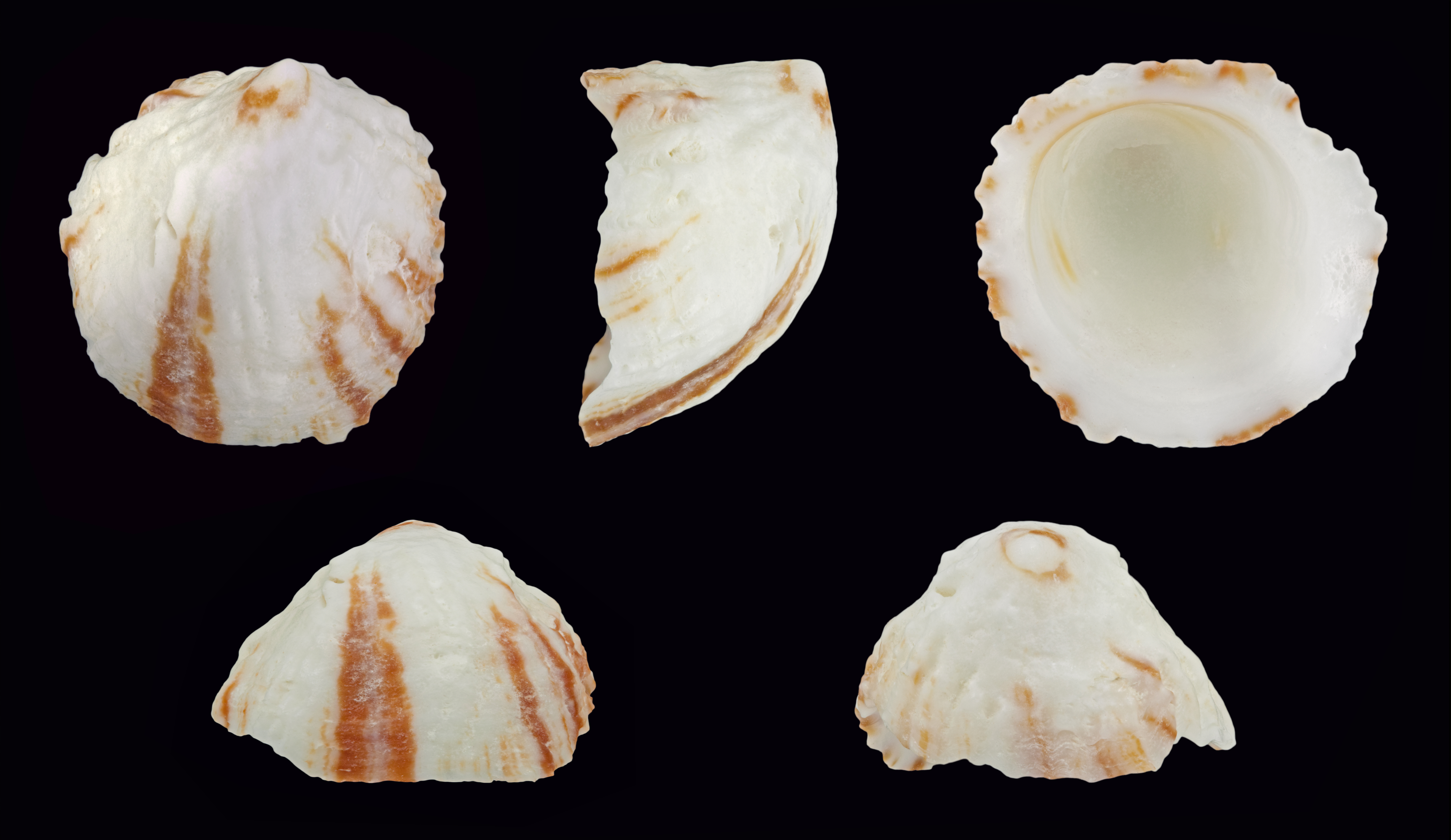
- Sabia conica acuta

Scientific classification
- Kingdom: Animalia
- Phylum: Mollusca
- Class: Gastropoda
- Subclass: Caenogastropoda
- Order: Littorinimorpha
- Family: Hipponicidae
- Genus: Sabia
- Species: S. conica

Binomial name
- Sabia conica (Schumacher, 1817)

Synonyms
- List: Amalthea conica Schumacher, 1817; Antisabia conica (Schumacher, 1817); Hipponix acuta Quoy & Gaimard, 1835; Hipponix acutus Quoy & Gaimard, 1835; Hipponix conica (Schumacher, 1817); Hipponix conicus (Schumacher, 1817); Sabia wyattae Powell, 1958

= Sabia conica =

Species of gastropod

Sabia conica, commonly known as the bonnet limpet, is a species of small limpet-like sea snail, a marine gastropod mollusk in the family Hipponicidae, the hoof snails.

== Description ==
The shell size varies between 7 mm and 45 mm

== Distribution ==
This species is distributed in the Indian Ocean along Tanzania, in the western Pacific, in the Red Sea and in the Mediterranean Sea.
