= Austrasiatica hirasei =

Scientific classification
- Kingdom: Animalia
- Phylum: Mollusca
- Class: Gastropoda
- Subclass: Caenogastropoda
- Order: Littorinimorpha
- Family: Cypraeidae
- Genus: Austrasiatica
- Species: A. hirasei

Binomial name
- Austrasiatica hirasei (Roberts, 1913)

Synonyms
- Cypraea hirasei Roberts, 1913

Species of gastropod

Austrasiatica hirasei is a species of sea snail, a cowry, a marine gastropod mollusc in the family Cypraeidae, the cowries. It was first described by as Cypraea hirasei by S. Raymond Roberts, in 1913. from a specimen found at Tanabe, on the Kii Coast in Japan.

== Distribution ==
Range: East China Sea, Japan, Philippines, Fiji, Australia
