= Austrasiatica alexhuberti =

Scientific classification
- Kingdom: Animalia
- Phylum: Mollusca
- Class: Gastropoda
- Subclass: Caenogastropoda
- Order: Littorinimorpha
- Family: Cypraeidae
- Genus: Austrasiatica
- Species: A. alexhuberti

Binomial name
- Austrasiatica alexhuberti Lorenz & Hubert, 2000

Synonyms
- Nesiocypraea alexhuberti Lorenz & Huber, 2000 (Molecular data shows it belongs in Austrasiatica)

Species of gastropod

Austrasiatica axelhuberti is a species of sea snail, a cowry, a marine gastropod mollusc in the family Cypraeidae, the cowries.
