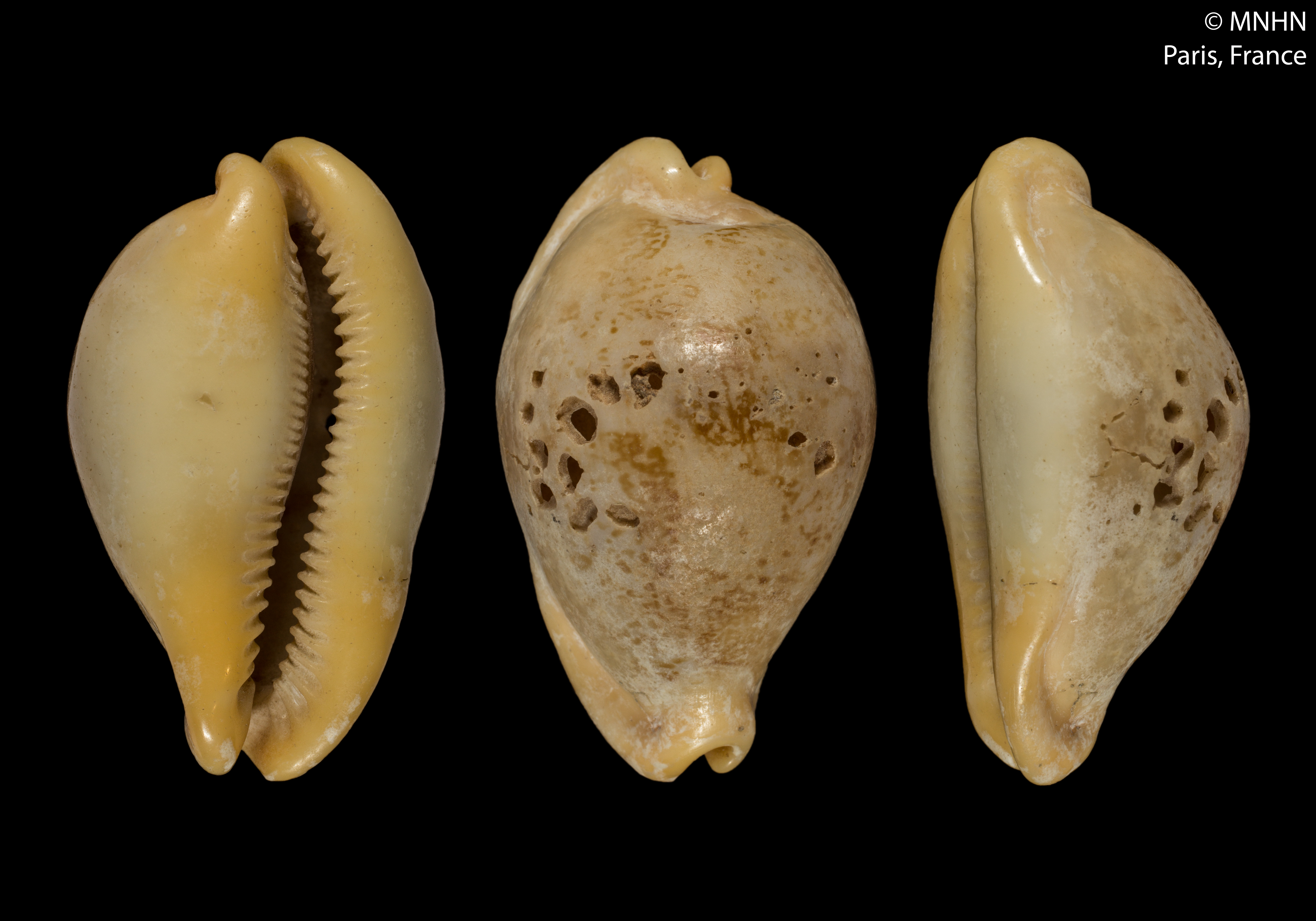
- Shell of Austrasiatica deforgesi (holotype at MNHN, Paris)

Scientific classification
- Kingdom: Animalia
- Phylum: Mollusca
- Class: Gastropoda
- Subclass: Caenogastropoda
- Order: Littorinimorpha
- Family: Cypraeidae
- Genus: Austrasiatica
- Species: A. deforgesi

Binomial name
- Austrasiatica deforgesi Lorenz, 2002

Synonyms
- Nesiocypraea deforgesi Lorenz, 2002 (basionym)

= Austrasiatica deforgesi =

Species of gastropod

Austrasiatica deforgesi is a species of sea snail, a cowry, a marine gastropod mollusc in the family Cypraeidae, the cowries.
