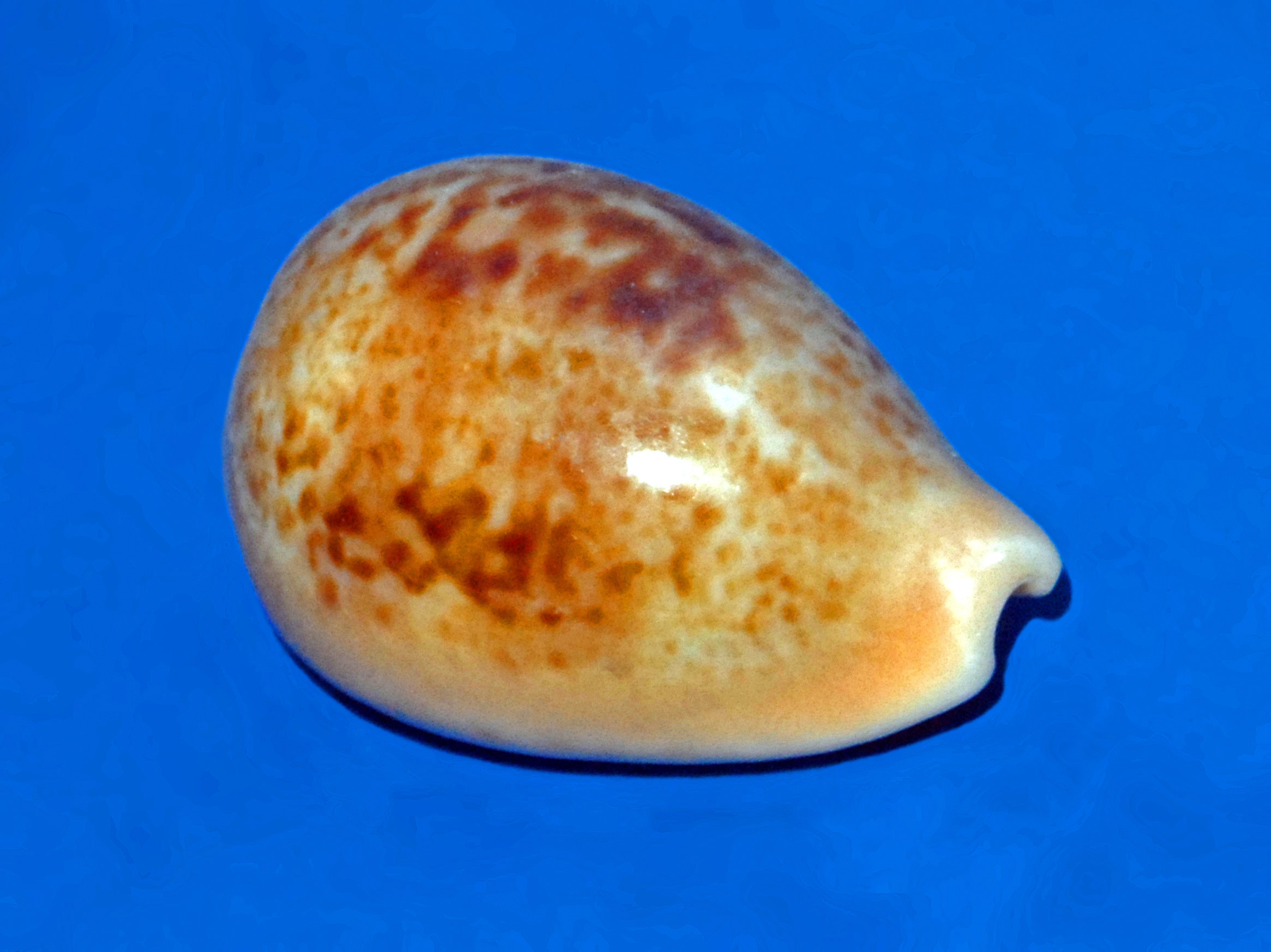
- Shell of Schilderina achatidea from Sicily at the Museo Civico di Storia Naturale di Milano

Scientific classification
- Kingdom: Animalia
- Phylum: Mollusca
- Class: Gastropoda
- Subclass: Caenogastropoda
- Order: Littorinimorpha
- Family: Cypraeidae
- Genus: Schilderina
- Species: S. achatidea

Binomial name
- Schilderina achatidea (Gray in Sowerby II, 1837)

Synonyms
- Cypraea achatidea Gray in Sowerby II, 1837; Cypraea achatidea inopinata (Schilder, 1930); Cypraea achatidea var. auricoma Crosse, 1897; Cypraea achatidea var. elongata Pallary, 1900; Cypraea achatidea var. globosa Pallary, 1900; Cypraea achatidea var. lineata Pallary, 1900; Cypraea achatidea var. major Pallary, 1900; Cypraea achatidea var. minor Pallary, 1900; Cypraea achatidea var. nana Crosse, 1897; Cypraea achatidea var. oranica Crosse, 1897; Cypraea achatidea var. punctata Pallary, 1900; Schilderia achatidea (J. E. Gray, 1837); Schilderina auricoma (Crosse, 1897); Schilderina oranica (Crosse, 1897)

= Schilderina achatidea =

Species of gastropod

Schilderina achatidea, common name agate cowry, is a species of sea snail, a cowry, a marine gastropod mollusc in the family Cypraeidae, the cowries.

== Description ==
The shell size varies between 22 mm and 50 mm. The dorsum surface is usually brown, while the base is white.

== Distribution ==
This species can be found in the Mediterranean Sea and in northwestern Africa.

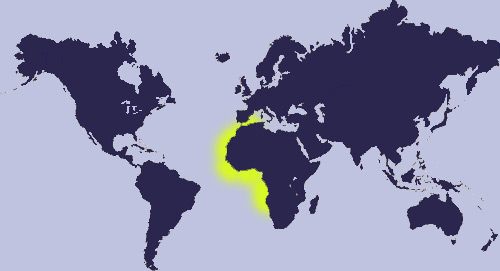
Distribution

== Subspecies ==
- Schilderina achatidea achatidea Gray in Sowerby II, 1837
- Schilderina achatidea inopinata Schilder, 1930
- Schilderina achatidea verdensis (Lorenz, 2017)
