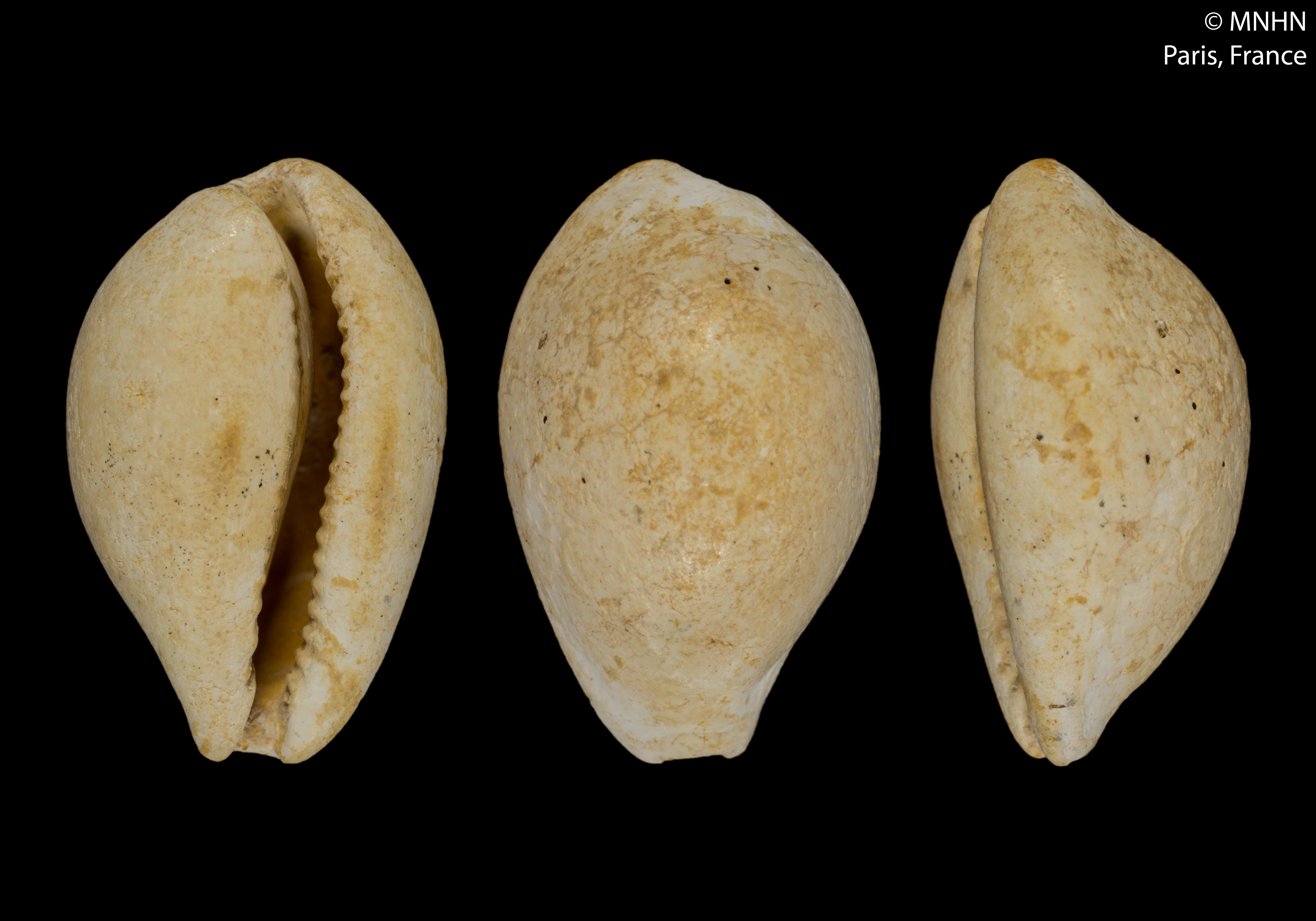
- Shell of † Schilderia brebioni (holotype at MNHN, Paris)

Scientific classification
- Kingdom: Animalia
- Phylum: Mollusca
- Class: Gastropoda
- Subclass: Caenogastropoda
- Order: Littorinimorpha
- Superfamily: Cypraeoidea
- Family: Cypraeidae
- Genus: Schilderina; Dolin & Aguerre, 2020

Type species
- Cypraea achatidea J. E. Gray, 1837

= Schilderina =

Genus of gastropods

Schilderina is a genus of sea snails, marine gastropod molluscs in the subfamily Zonariinae of the family Cypraeidae, the cowries.

== Species ==
- Schilderina achatidea (Gray, 1837)
- † Schilderina amygdalum (Brocchi, 1814)
- † Schilderina andegavensis (Defrance, 1826)
- † Schilderina austriaca (Schilder, 1927)
- † Schilderina brebioni (Dolin & Lozouet, 2004)
- † Schilderina charlesi Dolin & Aguerre, 2020
- † Schilderina columbaria (Lamarck, 1822)
- † Schilderina decorticata (Defrance, 1826)
- † Schilderina dertoflavicula (Sacco, 1894)
- † Schilderina elegantissima (Dolin & Lozouet, 2004)
- † Schilderina longiscata (Mayer, 1875)
- † Schilderina orbiculata (Dolin & Lozouet, 2004)
- † Schilderina paulensis (Dolin & Lozouet, 2004)
- † Schilderina semidenticulata (Sacco, 1894)
- † Schilderina transsylvanica (Schilder, 1927)
- † Schilderina utriculata (Lamarck, 1810)
- † Schilderina vaesseni Dolin & Aguerre, 2020

Synonyms

- Schilderina auricoma (Crosse, 1897): synonym of Schilderina achatidea (Gray, 1837)
- Schilderina inopinata (Schilder, 1930): synonym of Schilderina achatidea inopinata (Schilder, 1930)
- Schilderina longinqua (Schilder & Schilder, 1938): synonym of Schilderina achatidea inopinata (Schilder, 1930)
- Schilderina oranica (Crosse, 1897): synonym of Schilderina achatidea (Gray, 1837)
