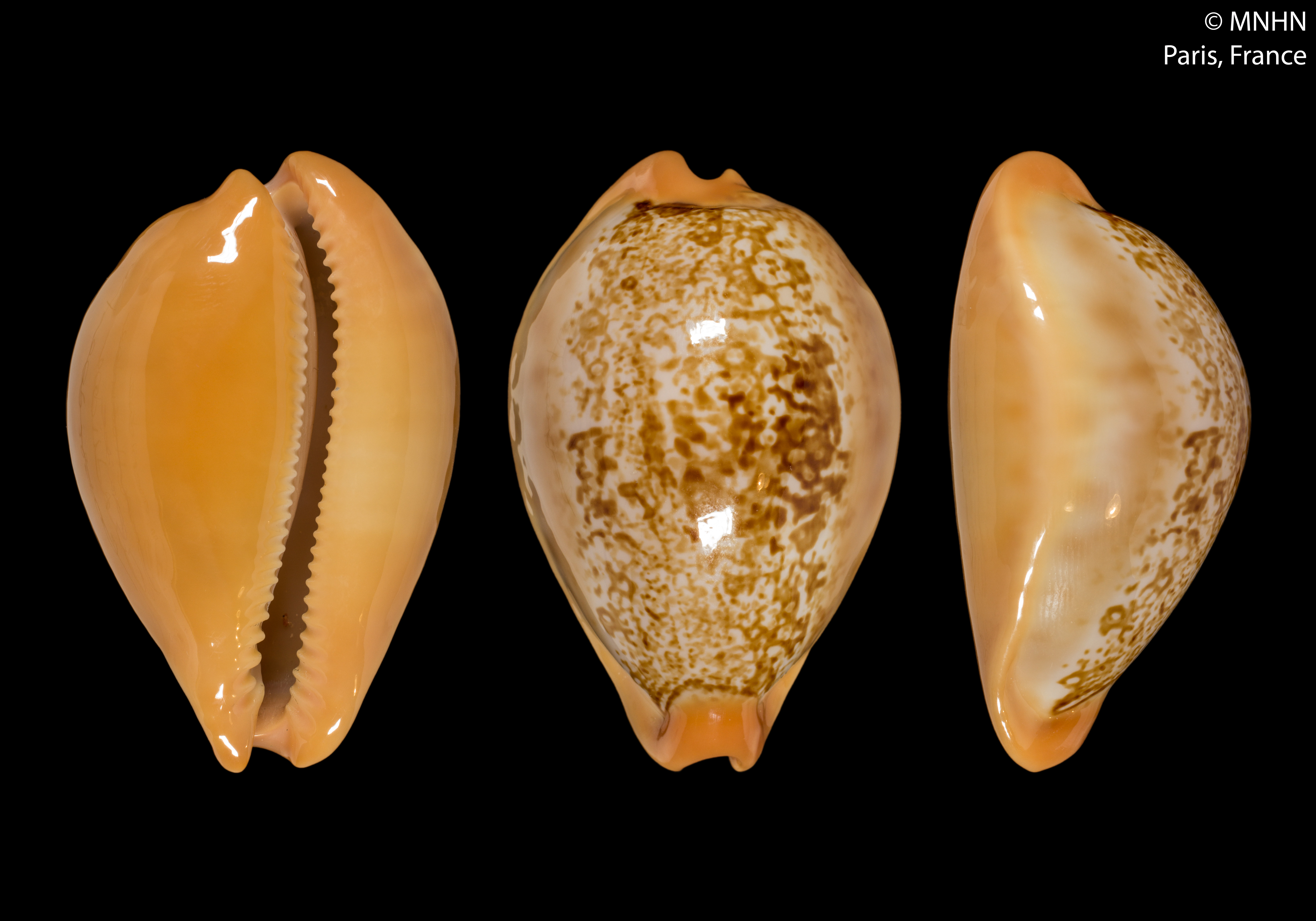
- Shell of Austrasiatica langfordi cavatoensis (holotype at MNHN, Paris)

Scientific classification
- Kingdom: Animalia
- Phylum: Mollusca
- Class: Gastropoda
- Subclass: Caenogastropoda
- Order: Littorinimorpha
- Family: Cypraeidae
- Genus: Austrasiatica
- Species: A. langfordi

Binomial name
- Austrasiatica langfordi (Kuroda, 1938)

Synonyms
- Cypraea langfordi (Kuroda, 1938); Erronea (Gratiadusta) langfordi Kuroda, 1938 (basionym); Erronea langfordi Kuroda, 1938 (original combination); Nesiocypraea langfordi (Kuroda, 1938)

= Austrasiatica langfordi =

Langford's cowry

Species of gastropod

Austrasiatica langfordi, common name : Langford's cowry, is a species of sea snail, a cowry, a marine gastropod mollusc in the family Cypraeidae, the cowries.

== Subspecies ==
- Austrasiatica langfordi cavatoensis (Lorenz, F. Jr., 2002)
- Austrasiatica langfordi langfordi (Kuroda, 1938)
- Austrasiatica langfordi moretonensis (Schilder, F.A., 1965)
- Austrasiatica langfordi poppeorum Lorenz & Chiapponi, 2017

== Description ==
The shell size varies between 37 mm and 70 mm. It lives from Honshu, to Indonesia, to Melanesia. It lives in depths from around 100 to 250 metres.

== Distribution ==
This species occurs in the Pacific Ocean off Japan and Northern Australia.
