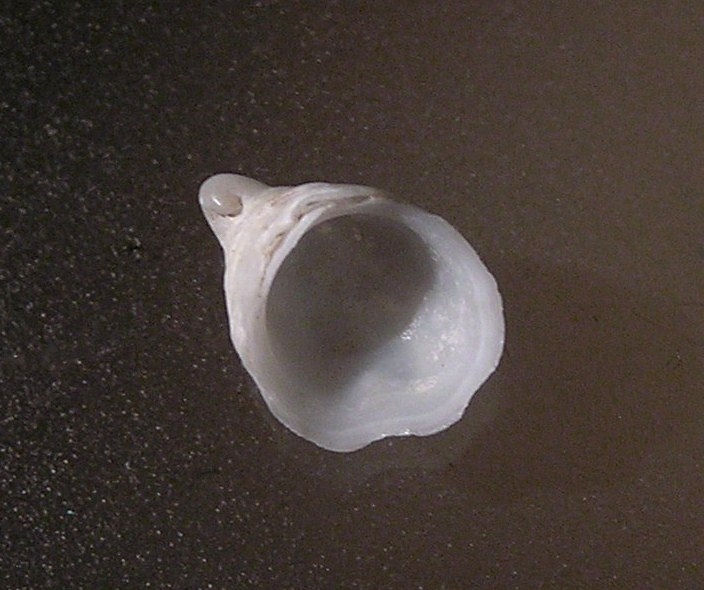
- A shell of Malluvium otohimae

Scientific classification
- Kingdom: Animalia
- Phylum: Mollusca
- Class: Gastropoda
- Subclass: Caenogastropoda
- Order: Littorinimorpha
- Superfamily: Hipponicoidea; Troschel, 1861

Families
- See text

= Hipponicoidea =

Superfamily of gastropods

Hipponicoidea, common name hoof shells or hoof snails, is a superfamily of small sea snails, limpet-like marine gastropod molluscs in the superfamily Hipponicoidea.

== Families ==
- Hipponicidae Troschel, 1861

Synonyms

- Amaltheidae Dall, 1889: synonym of Hipponicidae Troschel, 1861 (Invalid: type genus a junior homonym of Amalthea Rafinesque, 1815 [Hymenoptera])
- Cheileidae Macpherson & Chapple, 1951: synonym of Hipponicidae Troschel, 1861
