= Austrasiatica sakuraii =

Scientific classification
- Kingdom: Animalia
- Phylum: Mollusca
- Class: Gastropoda
- Subclass: Caenogastropoda
- Order: Littorinimorpha
- Family: Cypraeidae
- Genus: Austrasiatica
- Species: A. sakuraii

Binomial name
- Austrasiatica sakuraii (Habe, 1970)

Synonyms
- Cypraea sakuraii Habe, 1970

Species of gastropod

Austrasiatica sakuraii is a species of sea snail, a cowry, a marine gastropod mollusc in the family Cypraeidae, the cowries.
