= Jacques Louis Marin DeFrance =

French malacologist

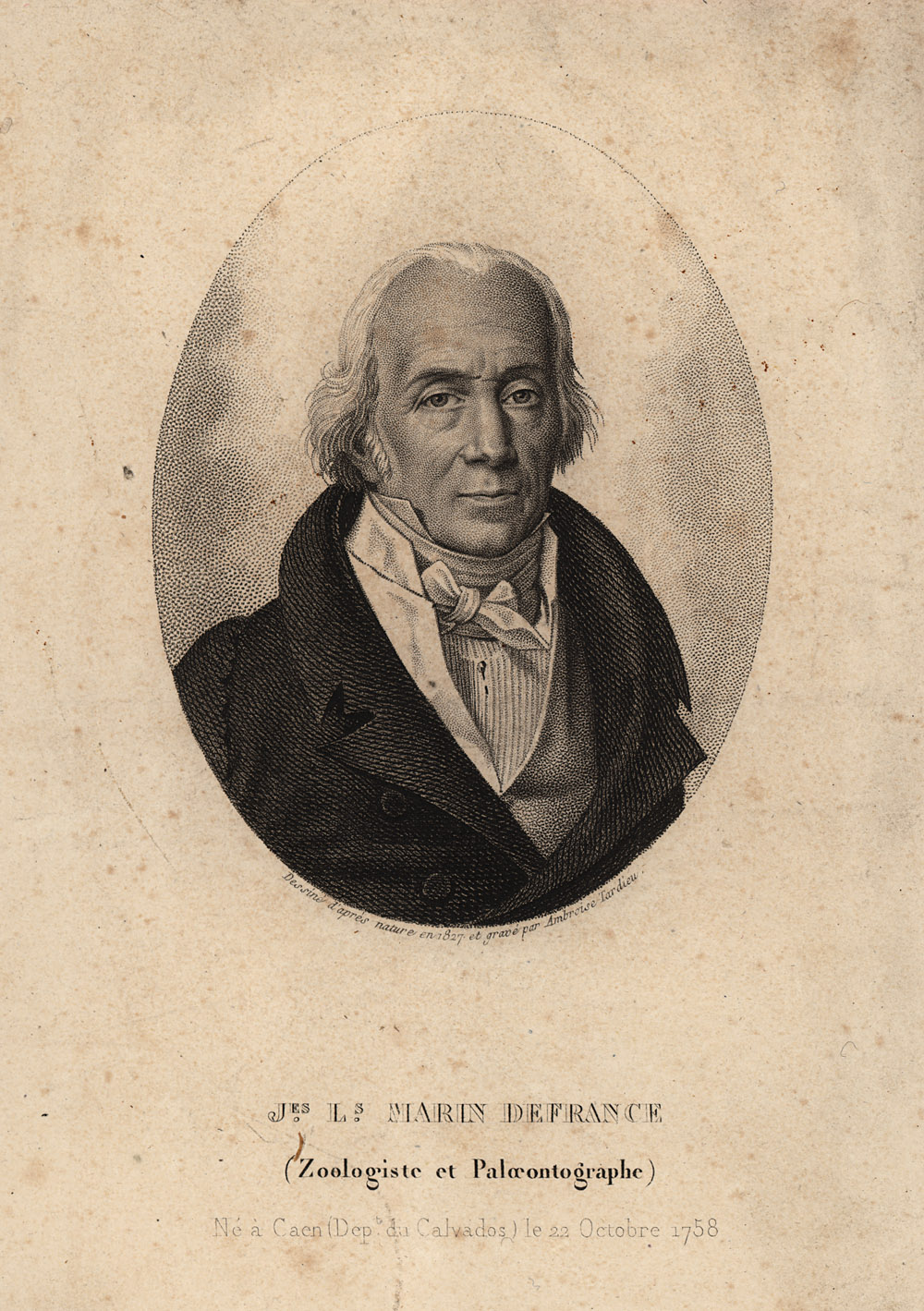
Jacques Louis Marin DeFrance, by Ambroise Tardieu (1788-1841) (engraver)

Jacques Louis Marin DeFrance (22 October 1758 – 12 November 1850) was a French malacologist.

== Works ==
- Tableau Des Corps Organisés Fossiles: Précédé De Remarques Sur Leur Pétrification, Paris 1824, gallica
