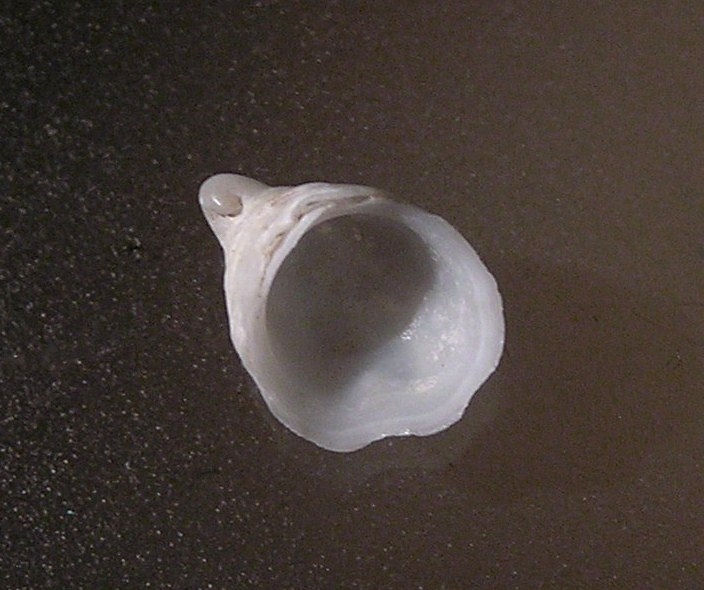
- A shell of Malluvium otohimae

Scientific classification
- Kingdom: Animalia
- Phylum: Mollusca
- Class: Gastropoda
- Subclass: Caenogastropoda
- Order: Littorinimorpha
- Superfamily: Hipponicoidea
- Family: Hipponicidae; Troschel, 1861

Genera
- See text

Synonyms
- Amaltheidae (Invalid: type genus a junior homonym of Amalthea Rafinesque, 1815 [Hymenoptera]); Cheileidae Macpherson & Chapple, 1951

= Hipponicidae =

Family of gastropods

Hipponicidae, common name hoof shells or hoof snails, is a family of small sea snails, limpet-like marine gastropod molluscs in the superfamily Hipponicoidea.

== Genera ==
Genera within the family Hipponicidae include:

- Antisabia Iredale, 1937
- Cheilea Modeer, 1793 – synonym: Mitrularia Schumacher, 1817
- Hipponix DeFrance, 1819
- Leptonotis Conrad, 1866
- Malluvium Melvill, 1909
- Milicheilea Espinosa & Ortea, 2011
- Pilosabia Iredale, 1929
- Sabia Gray, 1841

Genera brought into synonymy

- Amalthea Schumacher, 1817: synonym of Sabia Gray, 1841
- Cheila : synonym of Cheilea Modeer, 1793 (incorrect subsequent spelling)
- Hipponyx [sic] : synonym of Hipponix Blainville, 1819 (misspelling - incorrect subsequent spelling)
- Krebsia Mörch, 1877: synonym of Hipponix Blainville, 1819
- Mitrularia Schumacher, 1817: synonym of Cheilea Modeer, 1793
- Neojanacus Suter, 1907: synonym of Leptonotis Conrad, 1866
- Tenpetasus Iredale, 1929: synonym of Hipponix Blainville, 1819
