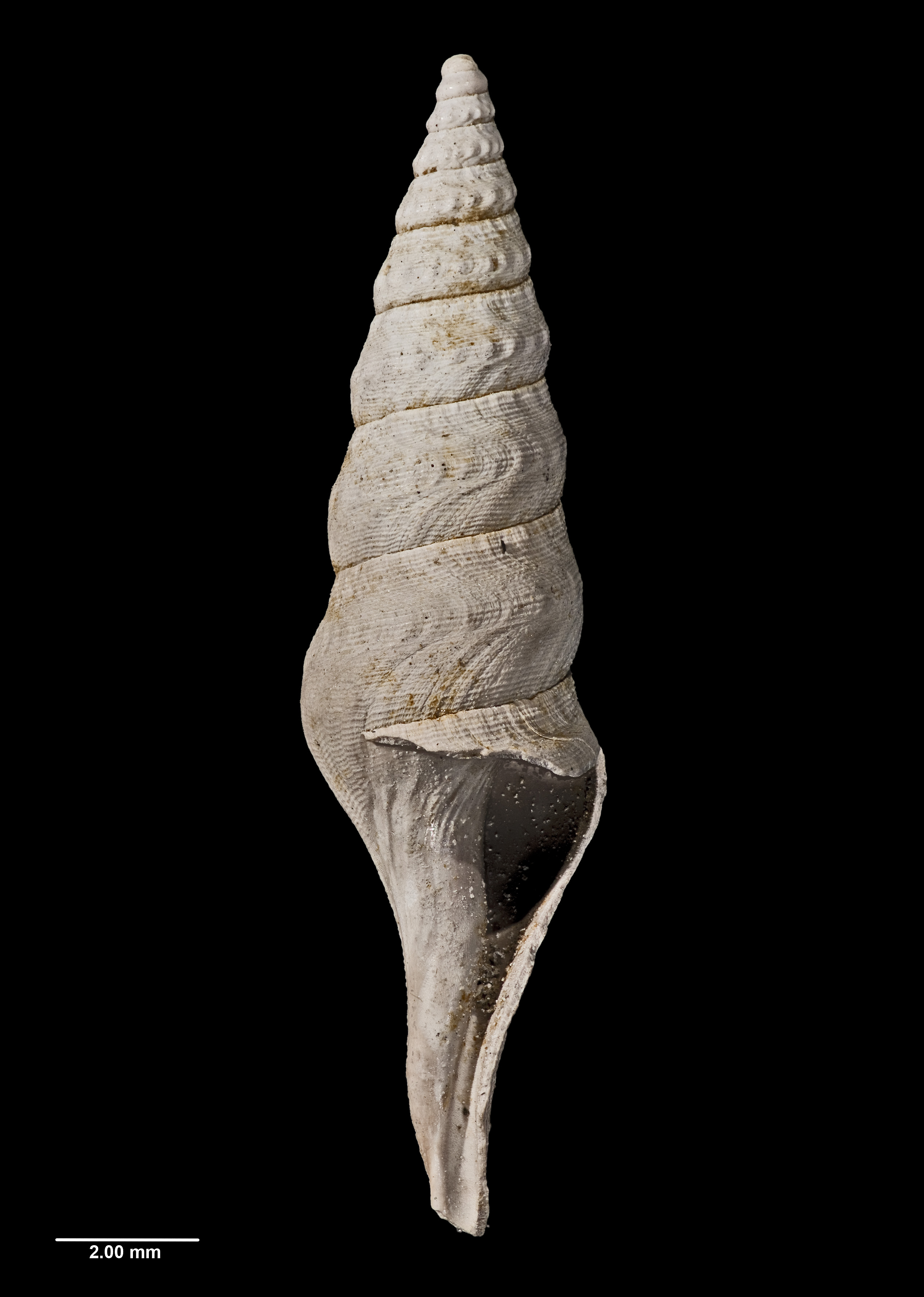
- Holotype of Optoturris edita

Scientific classification
- Kingdom: Animalia
- Phylum: Mollusca
- Class: Gastropoda
- Subclass: Caenogastropoda
- Order: Neogastropoda
- Genus: †Optoturris
- Species: †O. edita

Binomial name
- †Optoturris edita Powell, 1944

Synonyms
- Optoturris editus Powell, 1944

= Optoturris edita =

Optoturris edita Temporal range: Middle Miocene

Species of gastropod

Optoturris edita is an extinct species of sea snail, a marine gastropod mollusk in the superfamily Conoidea, currently unassigned to a family. It is known to occur in the middle Miocene in fossil beds of Victoria, Australia.

== Description ==
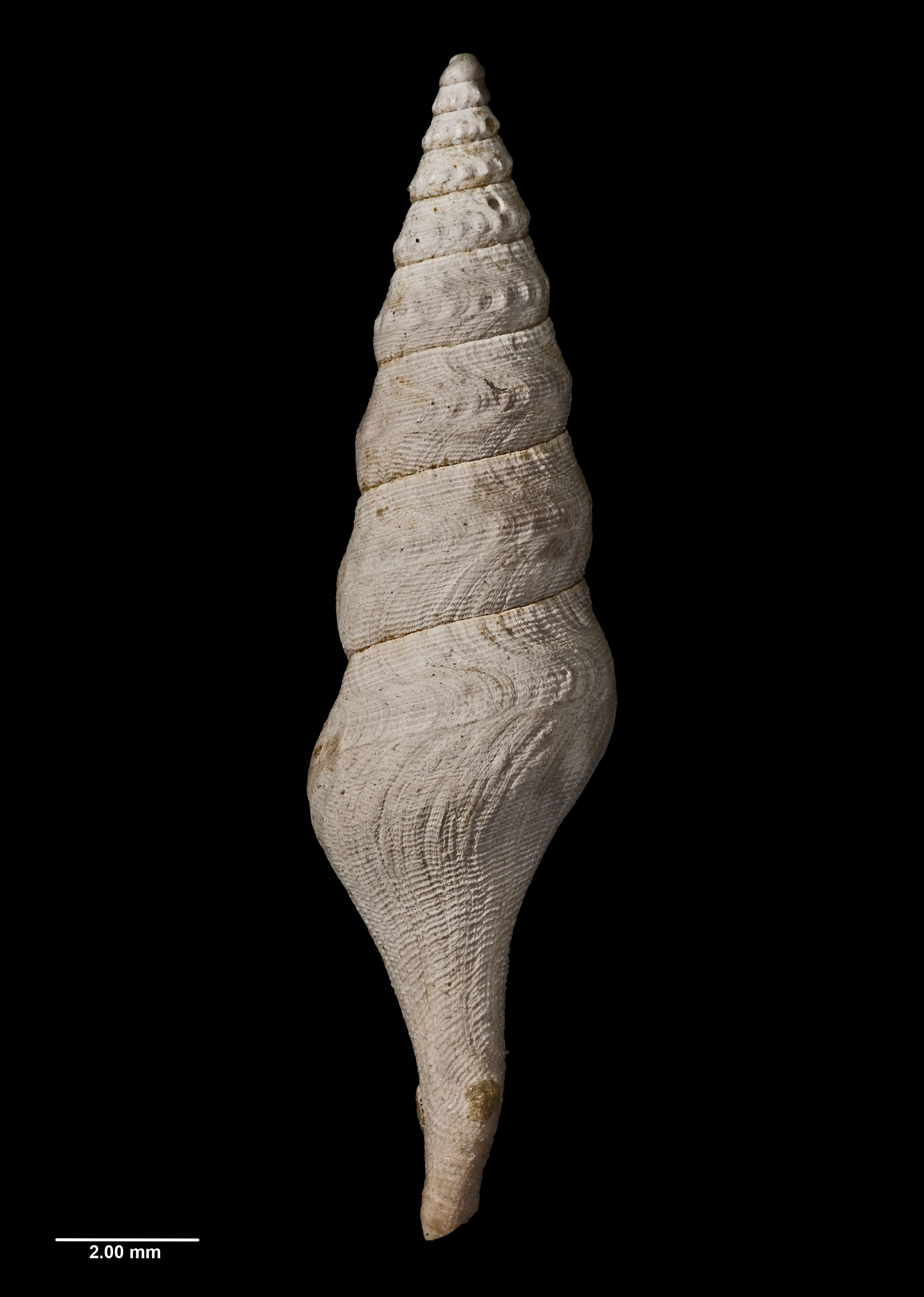
Reverse view of holotype

In the original description, Powell described the species as below:

Related to optatus, but much narrower, with taller spire, longer canal, and weaker, more dense spiral threads. The periphery is sub-angulate and below the middle on the early whorls, but both the penultimate and the body-whorl are regularly convex except for a very weak subsutural concavity. On the spire-whorls there are 3-4 slightly stronger spirals submargining the suture and 4 more forming a peripheral zone. There are dense microscopic threads on the shoulder between the subsutural and peripheral spirals, and from 5-14 weak spirals between the peripheral zone and the lower suture. Fine, dense, evenly developed spiral threads cover the base and anterior end. The sinus is broad, but only moderately deep, as described above, Axials are in the form of comma-shaped crenulations on the periphery of the early whorls, about 13 per whorl. The narrowness is accentuated in the holotype by abnormal loose coiling of the body-whorl.

The holotype measures 22 mm (0.87 in) in height, with a diameter of 6.5 mm (0.26 in).

== Taxonomy ==
Both the genus and species were first described by A. W. B. Powell in 1944 in the same paper. The holotype of the species is held by the Auckland War Memorial Museum. While part of the superfamily Conoidea, the genus was excluded from the family Turridae by Yu I Kantor et al. in 2024.

== Distribution ==
The species is known to have lived in the Middle Miocene, found in the Gellibrand Formation of the Port Phillip Basin, at Grice's Creek/Gunyoung Creek, Victoria, Australia.
