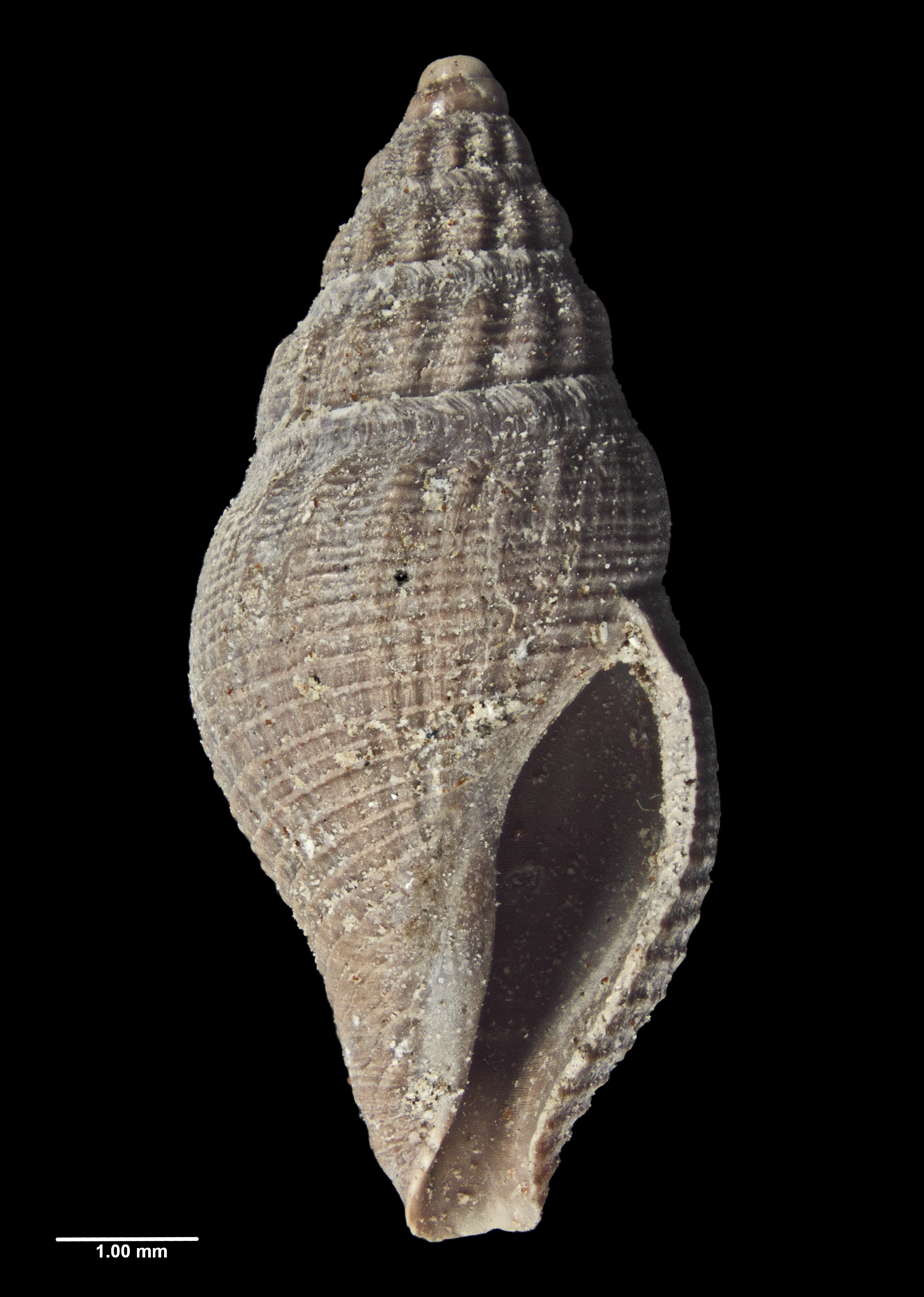
- Holotype

Scientific classification
- Kingdom: Animalia
- Phylum: Mollusca
- Class: Gastropoda
- Subclass: Caenogastropoda
- Order: Neogastropoda
- Superfamily: Conoidea
- Family: incertae sedis
- Genus: †Cryptoborsonia
- Species: †C. rugobela

Binomial name
- †Cryptoborsonia rugobela A. W. B. Powell, 1944

= Cryptoborsonia rugobela =

Extinct species of gastropod

Cryptoborsonia rugobela is an extinct species of sea snail, a marine gastropod mollusc, in the superfamily Conoidea, currently unassigned to a family. Dating to the Late Oligocene, fossils of the species have been found in Jan Juc Formation of the Port Phillip Basin in Victoria, Australia.

== Description ==
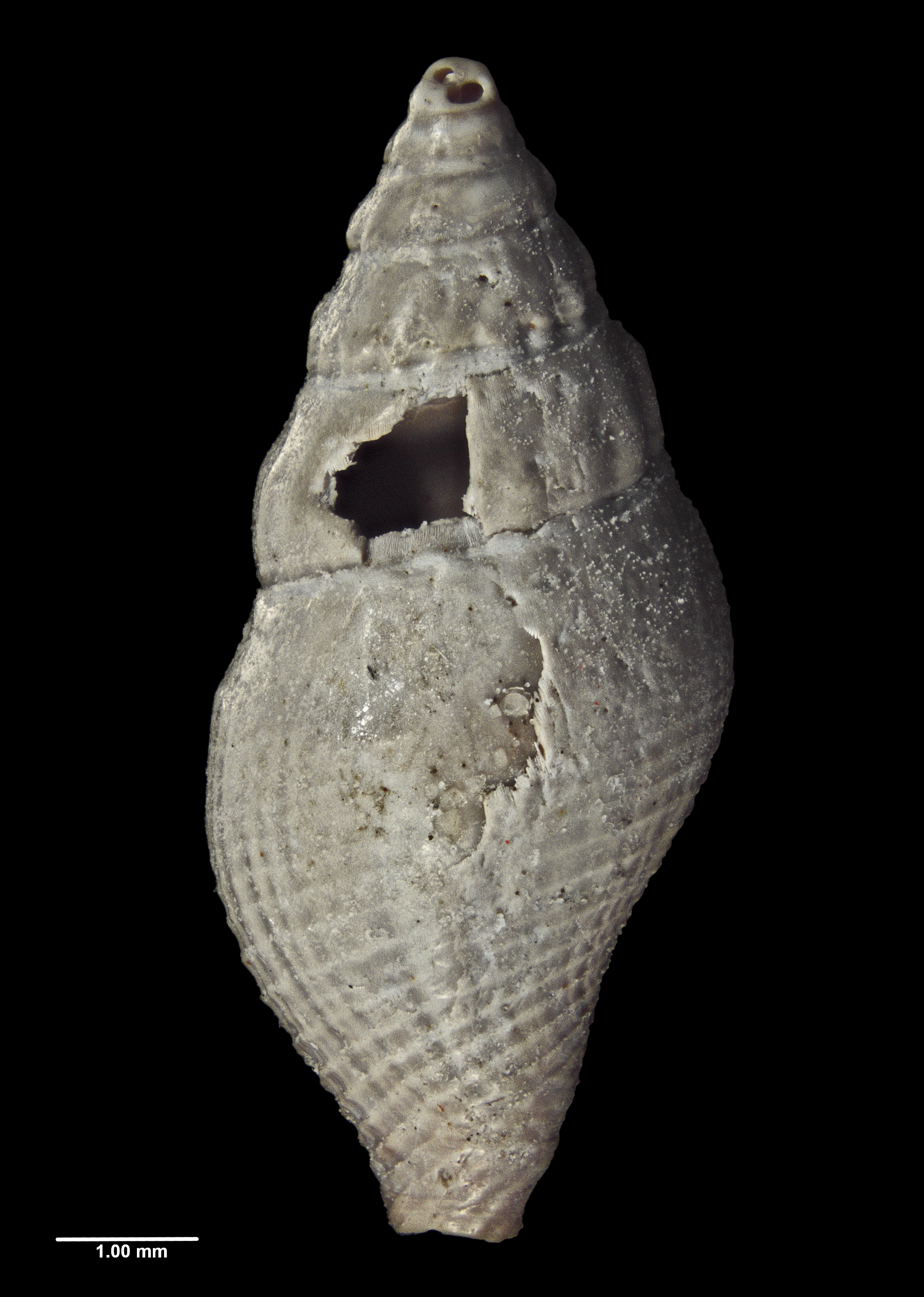
Reverse view of holotype

In the original description, Powell described the species as follows:

Small, biconic, with a subsutural fold and concave shoulder. Shoulder angle at two-thirds whorl height. Protoconch damaged, but as in [holotype of C. pleurotomella]. Post-nuclear sculpture of numerous sharply raised, narrow spiral cords 5-8 from shoulder angle to lower suture, 24 on body-whorl: widely spaced on base, weaker and more closely spaced towards shoulder. There are 2-3 weak spiral lirations on the shoulder or sinus area. Axials broadly rounded, strong on spire-whorls, obsolescent on body-whorl, 17 per whorl. Sinus occupying the shoulder, rather deep, arcuate, drawn forwards at the suture and produced forwards below in a broad, arcuate sweep. Outer lip thin. Pillar with a slight median bulge.

The holotype measures 8.5 mm (0.33 in) in height and 3.9 mm (0.15 in) in diameter.

== Taxonomy ==
The species was first described by A. W. B. Powell in 1944, in the same paper where he described the genus Cryptoborsonia. The holotype is held at the Auckland War Memorial Museum.

== Distribution ==
C. rugobela has been found in the Jan Juc Formation of the Port Phillip Basin in Victoria, dating to the Late Oligocene. The type location for the species is Torquay, Victoria.
