= Cryptodaphne kilburni =

Scientific classification
- Kingdom: Animalia
- Phylum: Mollusca
- Class: Gastropoda
- Subclass: Caenogastropoda
- Order: Neogastropoda
- Superfamily: Conoidea
- Family: Raphitomidae
- Genus: Cryptodaphne
- Species: C. kilburni

Binomial name
- Cryptodaphne kilburni Morassi & Bonfitto, 2006

Species of gastropod

Cryptodaphne kilburni is a species of sea snail, a marine gastropod mollusk in the family Raphitomidae.

== Description ==
The length of the shell attains 6.7 mm.

== Distribution ==
This marine species occurs at bathyal depths in the Gulf of Aden.
