= Cosmasyrinx =

Scientific classification
- Kingdom: Animalia
- Phylum: Mollusca
- Class: Gastropoda
- Subclass: Caenogastropoda
- Order: Neogastropoda
- Superfamily: Conoidea
- Family: incertae sedis
- Genus: †Cosmasyrinx; Marwick, 1931

Type species
- † Cosmasyrinx monilifera Marwick, 1931 (type by original designation)

Synonyms
- Cosmasyrinx (Cosmasyrinx) Marwick, 1931 alternative representation; † Cosmasyrinx (Tholitoma) H. J. Finlay & Marwick, 1937 alternative representation; † Tholitoma H. J. Finlay & Marwick, 1937 superseded rank

Genus of gastropods

Cosmasyrinx is an extinct genus of sea snails, marine gastropod mollusks, unassigned to a family within the superfamily Conoidea.

== Species ==
Species within the genus Cosmasyrinx include:

- † Cosmasyrinx antarctigera Stilwell, Zinsmeister & Oleinik, 2004
- † Cosmasyrinx ardua Marwick, 1931
- † Cosmasyrinx dolorosa (Finlay & Marwick, 1937)
- † Cosmasyrinx latior Marwick, 1931
- † Cosmasyrinx levicristata Darragh, 1997
- † Cosmasyrinx makiyamai Shuto, 1961 (uncertain > unassessed)
- † Cosmasyrinx marwicki Beu, 1970
- † Cosmasyrinx monilifera Marwick, 1931
- † Cosmasyrinx tereumera Marwick, 1931

Synonyms

- † Cosmasyrinx brychiosinus Stilwell & Zinsmeister, 1992: synonym of † Cochlespira brychiosinus (Stilwell & Zinsmeister, 1992)
- † Cosmasyrinx semilirata A. W. B. Powell, 1942: synonym of † Cryptodaphne semilirata (A. W. B. Powell, 1942) (superseded combination)
