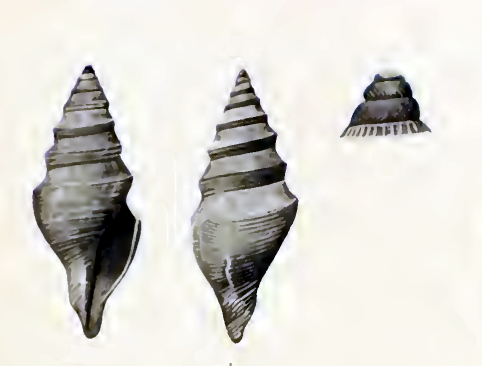
- Original image of a shell of Cryptodaphne gradata

Scientific classification
- Kingdom: Animalia
- Phylum: Mollusca
- Class: Gastropoda
- Subclass: Caenogastropoda
- Order: Neogastropoda
- Superfamily: Conoidea
- Family: Raphitomidae
- Genus: Cryptodaphne
- Species: C. gradata

Binomial name
- Cryptodaphne gradata (Schepman, 1913)

Synonyms
- Pleurotomella gradata Schepman, 1913

= Cryptodaphne gradata =

Species of gastropod

Cryptodaphne gradata is a species of sea snail, a marine gastropod mollusk in the family Raphitomidae.

== Description ==
The length of the shell attains 10½ mm, its diameter 4¼ mm.

(Original description) The white, fusiform shell is gradate and moderately strong. It contains 8 whorls (the uppermost broken), of which 2 form a reddish-brown protoconch, with convex whorls (their number probably will have been 4 of which 2 are wanting). The whorls are sculptured by curved riblets, crossed by oblique finer ones in the lower part, which is consequently finely reticulated. The subsequent whorls are convex, angular, gradate by a conspicuous excavation of the upper part, the lower part perpendicular. The spirals consist of a keel and a few, rather strong, slightly flattened lirae on the lower part, 4 in number on penultimate whorl and 2 narrow ones at the base of excavation, just above the keel The body whorl shows numerous stronger, flat lirae, eventually divided by a very fine groove, and some intermediate ones. The axial sculpture consists of numerous fine growth striae and curved riblets in the upper part of the excavation, less pronounced on the body whorl, not quite extending to the keel. The body whorl is convex, regularly attenuated towards the rather long siphonal canal. The aperture is elongate, angular above, ending in a long, gutterlike siphonal canal below. The peristome is broken, probably with a moderately wide, shallow sinus. The columellar margin is concave, with a rather strong layer of enamel along the siphonal canal.

== Distribution ==
This species occurs in the Halmahera Sea, East Indonesia
