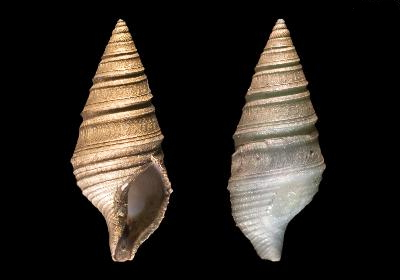
- Shell of Cryptodaphne adiaphora (holotype at MNHN, Paris)

Scientific classification
- Kingdom: Animalia
- Phylum: Mollusca
- Class: Gastropoda
- Subclass: Caenogastropoda
- Order: Neogastropoda
- Superfamily: Conoidea
- Family: Raphitomidae
- Genus: Cryptodaphne
- Species: C. adiaphora

Binomial name
- Cryptodaphne adiaphora Morassi & Bonfitto, 2010

= Cryptodaphne adiaphora =

Species of gastropod

Cryptodaphne adiaphora is a species of sea snail in the family Raphitomidae.

== Description ==
The holotype measures 5.6 mm × 2.3 mm (0.220 in × 0.091 in) (height times width). The aperture height is 2.5 mm (0.098 in).

== Distribution ==
This marine species is known from the depth of 1,058–1,091 m (3,471–3,579 ft) off Viti Levu (Fiji Islands).
