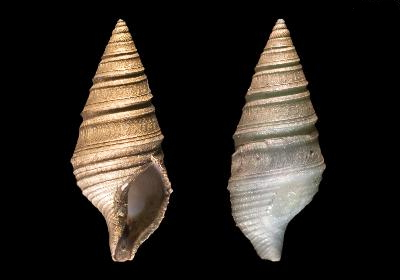
- Shell of Cryptodaphne adiaphora

Scientific classification
- Kingdom: Animalia
- Phylum: Mollusca
- Class: Gastropoda
- Subclass: Caenogastropoda
- Order: Neogastropoda
- Superfamily: Conoidea
- Family: Raphitomidae
- Genus: Cryptodaphne; Powell, 1942

Type species
- †Cryptodaphne pseudodrillia Powell, 1942

= Cryptodaphne =

Genus of gastropods

Cryptodaphne is a genus of sea snails in the family Raphitomidae.

== Species ==
There are eight recognized species within the genus Cryptodaphne:

- Cryptodaphne adiaphora Morassi & Bonfitto, 2010
- Cryptodaphne affinis (Schepman, 1913)
- † Cryptodaphne chattica Lozouet, 2017
- Cryptodaphne gradata (Schepman, 1913)
- Cryptodaphne kilburni Morassi & Bonfitto, 2006
- † Cryptodaphne pseudodrillia Powell, 1942
- Cryptodaphne rugosa Sysoev, 1997
- † Cryptodaphne semilirata (Powell, 1942)

Species brought into synonymy

- Cryptodaphne abbreviata (Schepman, 1913): synonym of Buccinaria abbreviata (Schepman, 1913)
- Cryptodaphne biconica (Schepman, 1913): synonym of Acamptodaphne biconica (Schepman, 1913)
- Cryptodaphne kennicotti (Dall, 1871): synonym of Suavodrillia kennicotti (Dall, 1871)
