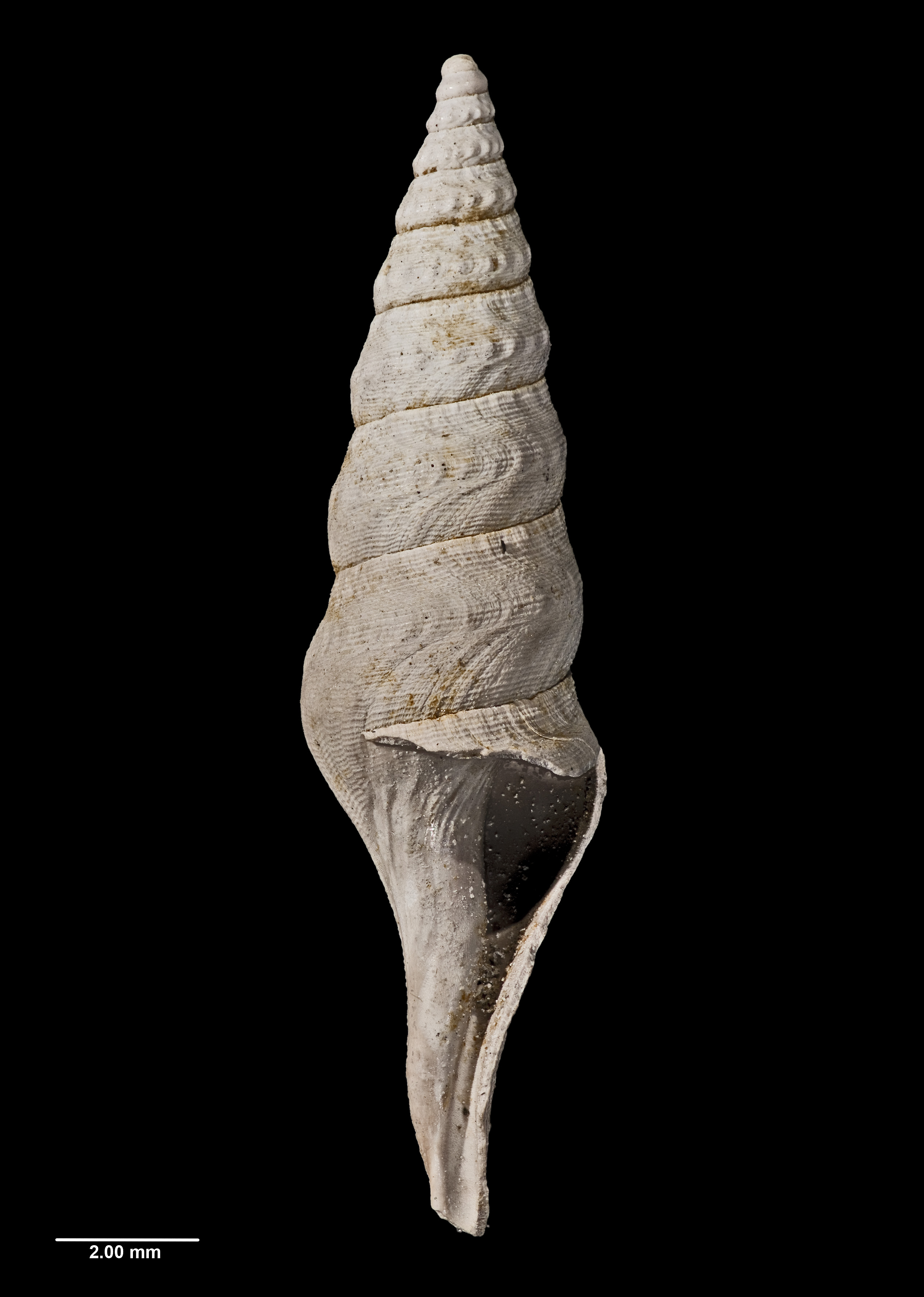
- Holotype of Optoturris edita

Scientific classification
- Kingdom: Animalia
- Phylum: Mollusca
- Class: Gastropoda
- Subclass: Caenogastropoda
- Order: Neogastropoda
- Superfamily: Conoidea
- Genus: †Optoturris; Powell, 1944

Type species
- † Pleurotoma optata G.F. Harris, 1897

= Optoturris =

Optoturris Temporal range: Eocene–Middle Miocene

Genus of gastropods

Optoturris is an extinct genus of sea snails, marine gastropod mollusks in the superfamily Conoidea, currently unassigned to a family. First occurring in the Eocene, the genus is known to have lived until at least the Middle Miocene. Three of the species are found in Miocene fossil beds of Australia, with other fossils being found in eastern Russia and Japan.

== Description ==
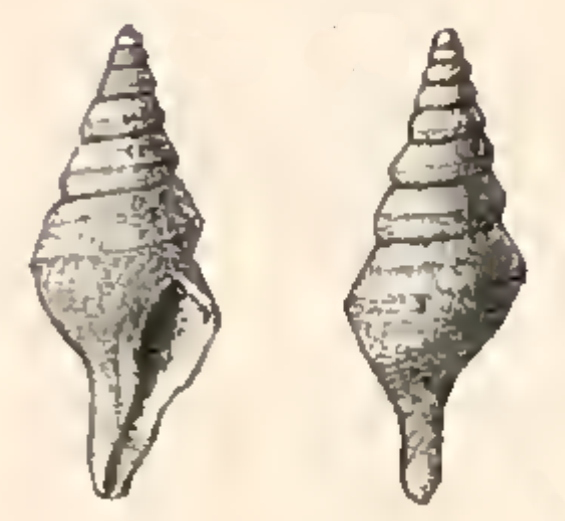
Shell of Optoturris optata

In the original description, Powell described the genus as below:

A curious Austral Miocene group with a paucispiral protoconch of 2½ smooth whorls, top bluntly rounded, although the tip is small and asymmetric; last whorl steep sided, lightly convex, with no definite brephic stage; merges into curved axials of adult sculpture. In this last respect the protoconch conforms with that of Turris, as opposed to those of Lophiotoma and Xenuroturris. The sinus is broad, "U"-shaped, not very deep, and extends over almost half the shoulder, with its lower edge situated at the weak peripheral carina. The anterior canal is relatively short and straight. The position of the sinus and general facies of the weakly sculptured type species give a false resemblance to the New Zealand Parasyrinx. The second species, paracantha, is superficially reminiscent of another New Zealand group, Cosmasyrinx.

== Taxonomy ==
Optoturris was first described by Baden Powell in 1944, who named Pleurotoma optata (Optoturris optatus) as the type species. Three of the known species date to the Miocene era of Australia. These were joined by O. kyushuensis in 1961, a fossil species from the Lower Pliocene in Japan. Formerly part of the family Turridae, the genus was excluded from the family by Yu I Kantor et al. in 2024, who kept the genus within the superfamily Conoidea.

== Distribution ==
The earliest known specimens are found in Eocene and Miocene fossil beds of the Kamchatka Peninsula, Russia. O. kyushuensis dates to the lower Takanabe member (Lower Pliocene), with the holotype being found at Kizukume Hill, Shintomi, Miyazaki in Kyushu, Japan. The remaining three species are found in Australia, and date to the Miocene: O. paracantha from the Bass Basin dating to the early Miocene, and both O. optatus and O. edita dating to the middle Miocene of the Port Phillip Basin, Victoria, Australia.

== Species ==
Species within the genus Optoturris include:

- † Optoturris edita A.W.B. Powell, 1944
- † Optoturris kyushuensis Shuto, 1961 - Japan (Lower Pliocene)
- † Optoturris optata (G.F. Harris, 1897)
- † Optoturris paracantha (Tenison-Woods, 1877)
