= Parasyrinx alta =

Scientific classification
- Domain: Eukaryota
- Kingdom: Animalia
- Phylum: Mollusca
- Class: Gastropoda
- Subclass: Caenogastropoda
- Order: Neogastropoda
- Superfamily: Conoidea
- Family: incertae sedis
- Genus: †Parasyrinx
- Species: †P. alta

Binomial name
- †Parasyrinx alta (G.F. Harris, 1897)

Synonyms
- † Leucosyrinx alta (G. F. Harris, 1897); † Pleurotoma alta G. F. Harris, 1897; † Pleurotoma pagoda Hutton, 1873 (Invalid: not Pleurotoma pagoda Reeve, 1845. P. alta Harris, 1897 is replacement name)

Species of gastropod

Parasyrinx alta is an extinct species of sea snail, a marine gastropod mollusk unassigned in the superfamily Conoidea.

== Description ==
Dimensions: length: 18 mm; breadth 7–5 mm; length of the aperture: 10mm.

The protoconch is composed of two elevated smooth whorls. The shell contains six whorls, smooth or only marked with growth-lines. They are very strongly and acutely keeled at the periphery, and show one or two inconspicuous spiral lineations, as an individual characteristic, above or below the keel. The body whorl is subangulate in front, denoting the position of growth as the suture became developed. The aperture is ovate, contracted anteriorly, and terminates in a rather long siphonal canal. The sinus is deep, situated between the keel and the suture, but nearer the former. The columella is twisted, covered with a smooth, thin deposit of shelly enamel.

(Original description) The shell has an elongato-fusiform shape. The spire is produced. The whorls are smooth and strongly keeled near the anterior end. Below the keel it is concave, with a low obtuse spiral rib on the body whorl. The aperture is ovate, and contracted anteriorly. The siphonal canal is long, straight and narrow.

== Distribution ==
Fossils of this marine species were found in Miocene strata in New Zealand.
