= Cosmasyrinx makiyamai =

Scientific classification
- Kingdom: Animalia
- Phylum: Mollusca
- Class: Gastropoda
- Subclass: Caenogastropoda
- Order: Neogastropoda
- Superfamily: Conoidea
- Family: incertae sedis
- Genus: †Cosmasyrinx
- Species: †C. makiyamai

Binomial name
- †Cosmasyrinx makiyamai T. Shuto, 1961

Synonyms
- Comitas makiyamai (Shuto, 1961)

Species of gastropod

Cosmasyrinx makiyamai is a species of sea snail, a marine gastropod mollusc, unassigned to a family within the superfamily Conoidea.

This species is unassessed and therefore uncertain.

== Distribution ==
This marine species occurs off Japan
