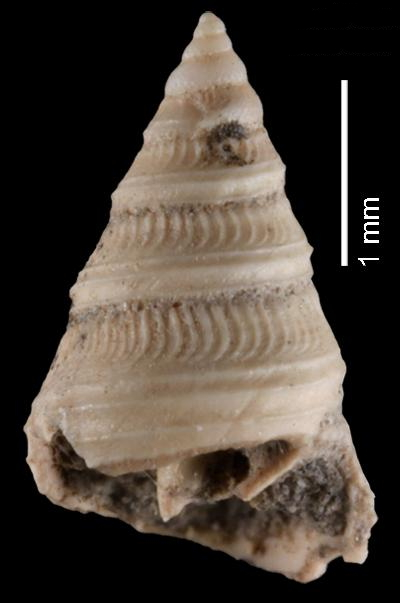
- (incomplete) shell of Cryptodaphne chattica (holotype at MNHN, Paris)

Scientific classification
- Kingdom: Animalia
- Phylum: Mollusca
- Class: Gastropoda
- Subclass: Caenogastropoda
- Order: Neogastropoda
- Superfamily: Conoidea
- Family: Raphitomidae
- Genus: Cryptodaphne
- Species: C. chattica

Binomial name
- Cryptodaphne chattica Lozouet, 2017

= Cryptodaphne chattica =

Species of gastropod

Cryptodaphne chattica is an extinct species of sea snail, a marine gastropod mollusk in the family Raphitomidae.

== Distribution ==
Fossils of this marine species were found in Oligocene strata of Aquitaine, France.
