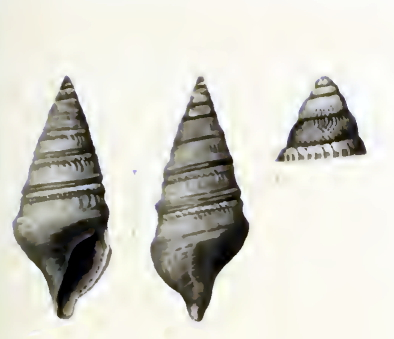
- Original image of a shell of Cryptodaphne affinis

Scientific classification
- Kingdom: Animalia
- Phylum: Mollusca
- Class: Gastropoda
- Subclass: Caenogastropoda
- Order: Neogastropoda
- Superfamily: Conoidea
- Family: Raphitomidae
- Genus: Cryptodaphne
- Species: C. affinis

Binomial name
- Cryptodaphne affinis (Schepman, 1913)

Synonyms
- Pleurotomella affinis Schepman, 1913

= Cryptodaphne affinis =

Species of gastropod

Cryptodaphne affinis is a species of sea snail, a marine gastropod mollusk in the family Raphitomidae.

== Description ==
The length of the shell attains 9 mm, its diameter 3¾ mm.

(Original description) The thin, white shell has a biconical shape. It contains about 10 whorls, of which about 4 form a red-brown protoconch, with convex whorls, of which about 1½ upper whorls are smooth. The other ones show angular riblets, strongest near the upper suture, crossed in their lower part by fine, oblique striae. The subsequent whorls show a broad, concave upper part and a much narrower lower part. The sculpture consists of 2 conspicuous spirals, just below the suture, less distinctly developed on the body whorl, 5 much fainter ones in the excavation. This latter is bordered by a rather strong keel, which makes the whorls angular. Moreover there is a second keel at some distance, with 2 faint intermediate ones on the penultimate whorl. The part below the excavation on the body whorl is lirate over its whole surface. The upper, excavated part of whorls is crossed by rather distant curved riblets, which, in crossing the infrasutural lirae, produce small beads. At last the whole shell is covered with fine growth striae and excessively fine granules. The body whorl is convex, strongly attenuated towards its base. The aperture is obliquely oblong, sharply angular above, ending below in a short, compressed, gutter-like siphonal canal. The peristome is broken, probably with a wide, shallow sinus. The columellar margin is concave, with a thin layer of enamel.

== Distribution ==
This species was found in the Ceram Sea, Indoneasia.
