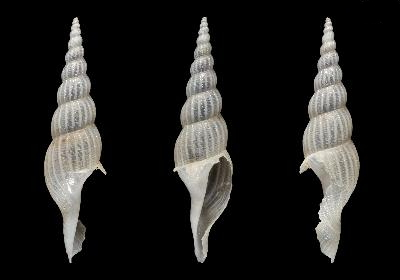
- Shells of Bouchetispira vitrea (holotype in the MNHN, Paris)

Scientific classification
- Kingdom: Animalia
- Phylum: Mollusca
- Class: Gastropoda
- Subclass: Caenogastropoda
- Order: Neogastropoda
- Superfamily: Conoidea
- Family: Bouchetispiridae; Kantor, E. E. Strong & Puillandre, 2012

Type genus
- Bouchetispira Kantor, E. E. Strong & Puillandre, 2012

Genera
- See text

= Bouchetispiridae =

Family of gastropods

Bouchetispiridae is a family of sea snail. The genus Bouchetispira is the only genus in the family Bouchetispiridae (a monotypic family). The scientific name of the family and the generic name is in honour of Philippe Bouchet, the French taxonomist and malacologist.
