= Cryptodaphne rugosa =

Scientific classification
- Kingdom: Animalia
- Phylum: Mollusca
- Class: Gastropoda
- Subclass: Caenogastropoda
- Order: Neogastropoda
- Superfamily: Conoidea
- Family: Raphitomidae
- Genus: Cryptodaphne
- Species: C. rugosa

Binomial name
- Cryptodaphne rugosa Sysoev, 1997

Species of gastropod

Cryptodaphne rugosa is a species of sea snail, a marine gastropod mollusk in the family Raphitomidae.

== Description ==
The length of the shell attains 12 mm.

== Distribution ==
This marine species occurs off East Indonesia in the Banda Sea and in the Arafura Sea at depths between 230 m and 425 m. This species is a non-broadcast spawner, with a life cycle that does not include a trocophore stage.
