= Cryptodaphne pseudodrillia =

Scientific classification
- Kingdom: Animalia
- Phylum: Mollusca
- Class: Gastropoda
- Subclass: Caenogastropoda
- Order: Neogastropoda
- Superfamily: Conoidea
- Family: Raphitomidae
- Genus: Cryptodaphne
- Species: C. pseudodrillia

Binomial name
- Cryptodaphne pseudodrillia Powell, 1942

Extinct species of gastropod

Cryptodaphne pseudodrillia is an extinct species of sea snail, a marine gastropod mollusk in the family Raphitomidae.

== Distribution ==
Fossils of this marine species were found in New Zealand.
