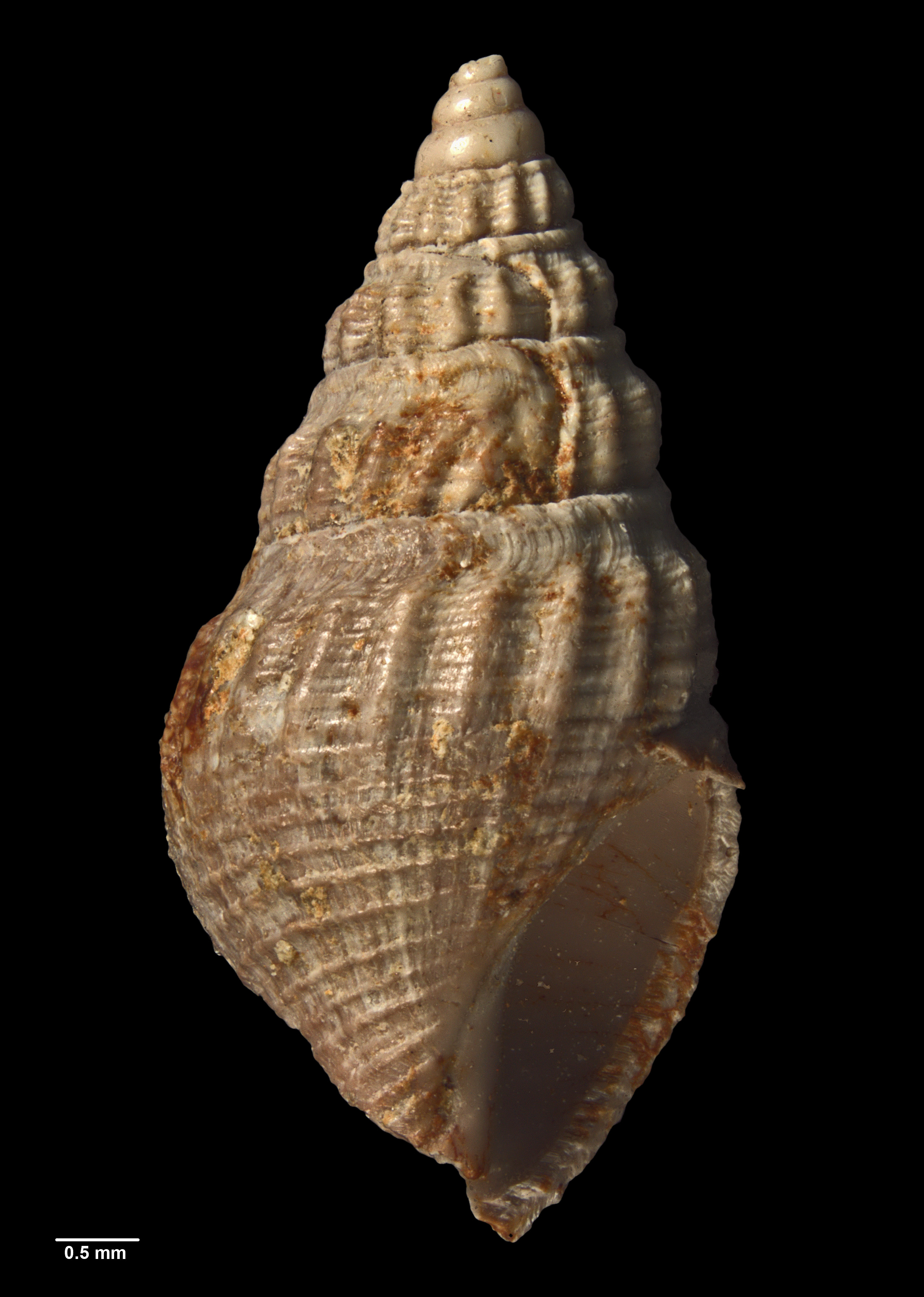
- Holotype from Auckland War Memorial Museum

Scientific classification
- Kingdom: Animalia
- Phylum: Mollusca
- Class: Gastropoda
- Subclass: Caenogastropoda
- Order: Neogastropoda
- Genus: †Rugobela
- Species: †R. exsculpta

Binomial name
- †Rugobela exsculpta A. W. B. Powell, 1944

= Rugobela exsculpta =

Rugobela exsculpta Temporal range: early Miocene

Extinct species of gastropod

Rugobela exsculpta is an extinct species of sea snail, a marine gastropod mollusc in the superfamily Conoidea, currently unassigned to a family. Fossils of the species date to the early Miocene, and occur in the strata of the Port Phillip Basin of Victoria, Australia.

== Description ==
In the original description, Powell described the species as follows:

Resembles columbelloides, but with more numerous axials, which are persistent over the body-whorl (obsolescent over body-whorl in columbelloides)... Axials strong, rounded, slightly oblique, 20 on body-whorl, extending from shoulder-angle to lower suture, not extending over base. Spiral cords moderately strong, 5 to 6 on spire-whorls. Interspaces increasing to two or three times width of cords over middle area of base. Whorls 7 1/2, including smooth, polished, polygyrate protoconch of 3 1/2 whorls.

The holotype of the species measures 7.2 mm (0.28 in) in height and 3.6 mm (0.14 in) in diameter. The species has more numerous and persistent axial ribs than Rugobela humerosa.

== Taxonomy ==
R. exsculpta was first described by A.W.B. Powell in 1944. The holotype was collected from the upper beds of Torquay, Victoria, at an unknown date prior to 1944, and is held by the Auckland War Memorial Museum.

== Distribution ==
This extinct marine species dates to the early Miocene, and occurs in the strata of the Port Phillip Basin of Victoria, Australia, known from the Puebla Formation.

== Gallery ==
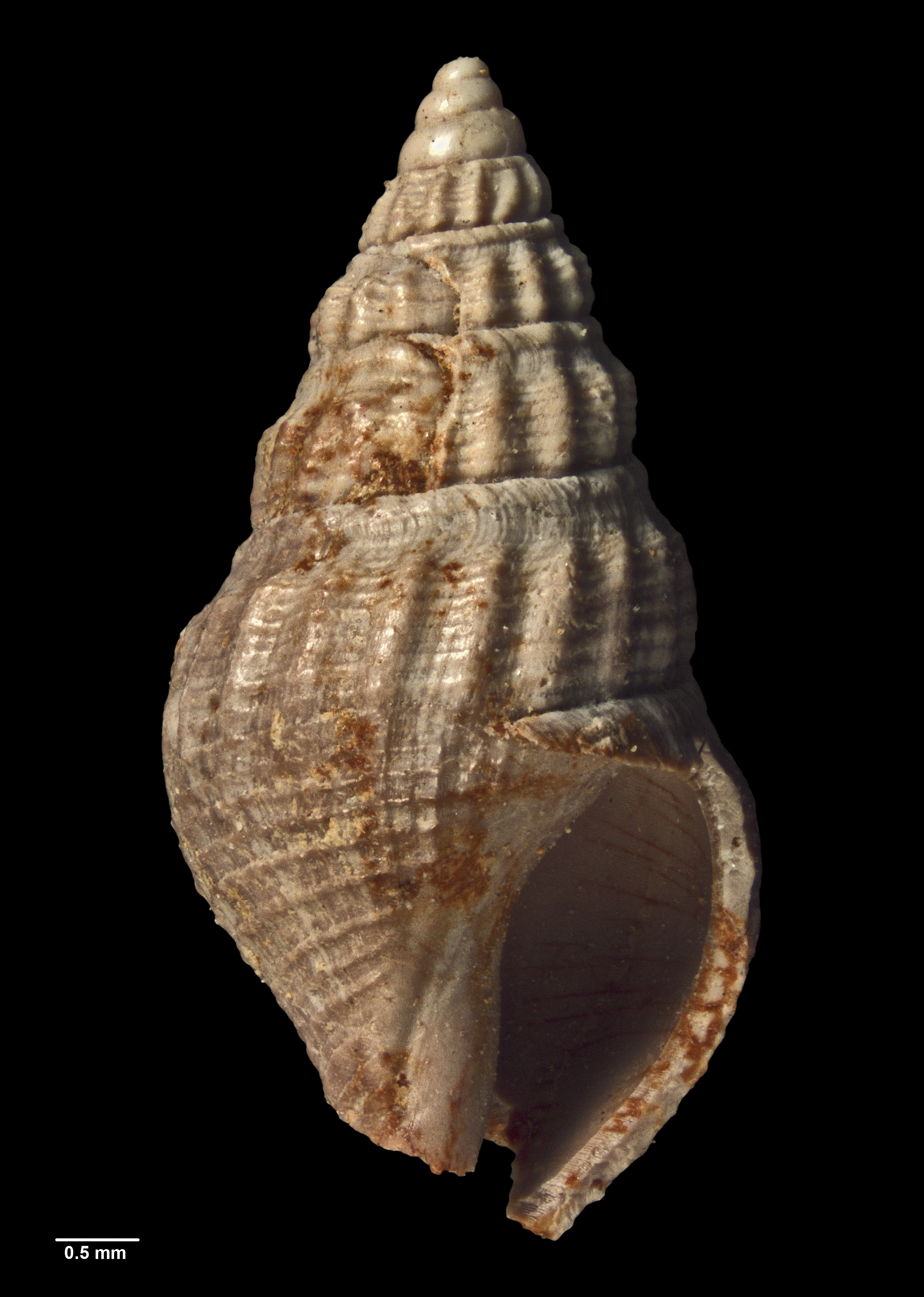
Side view of holotype

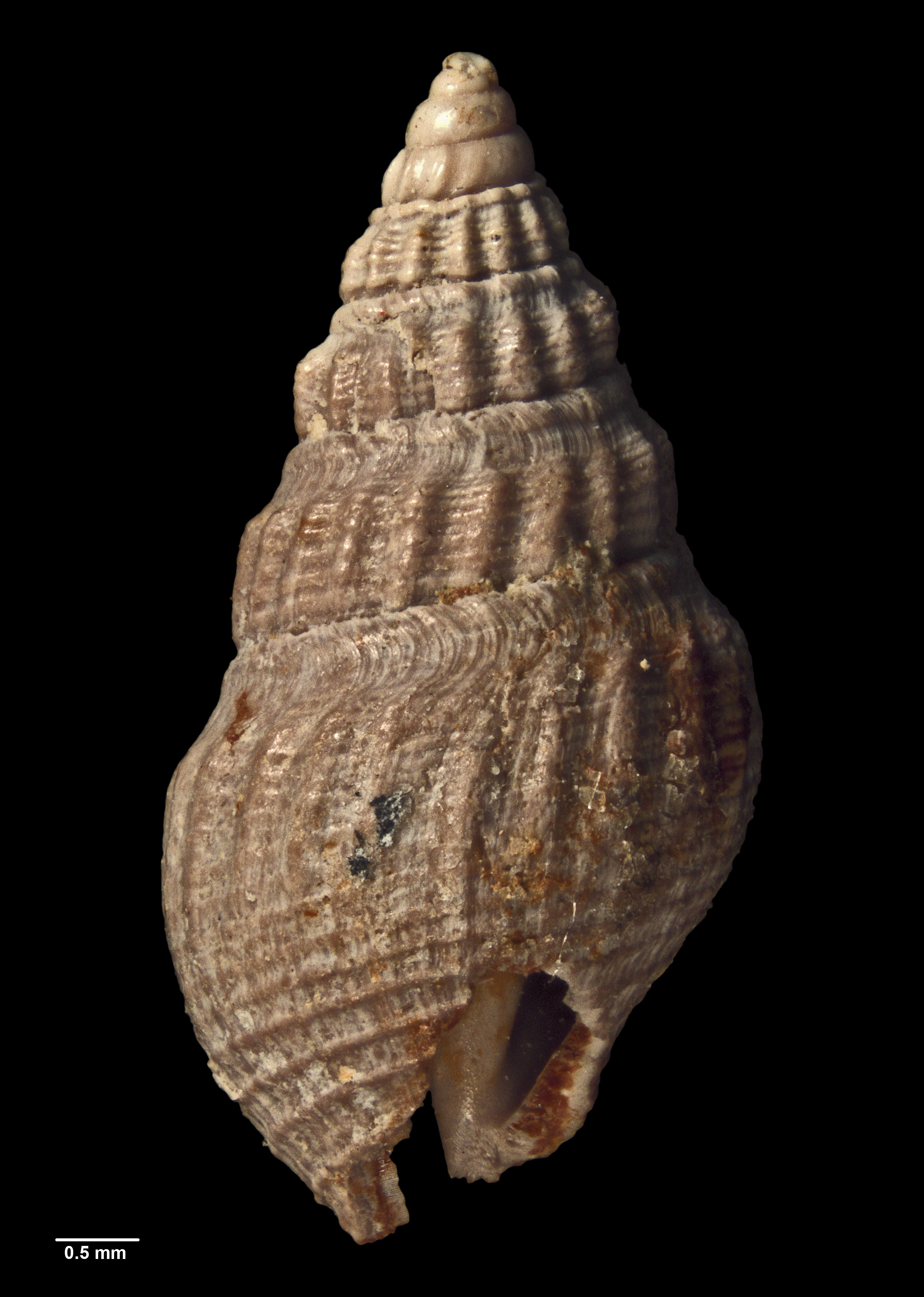
Reserve view of holotype
