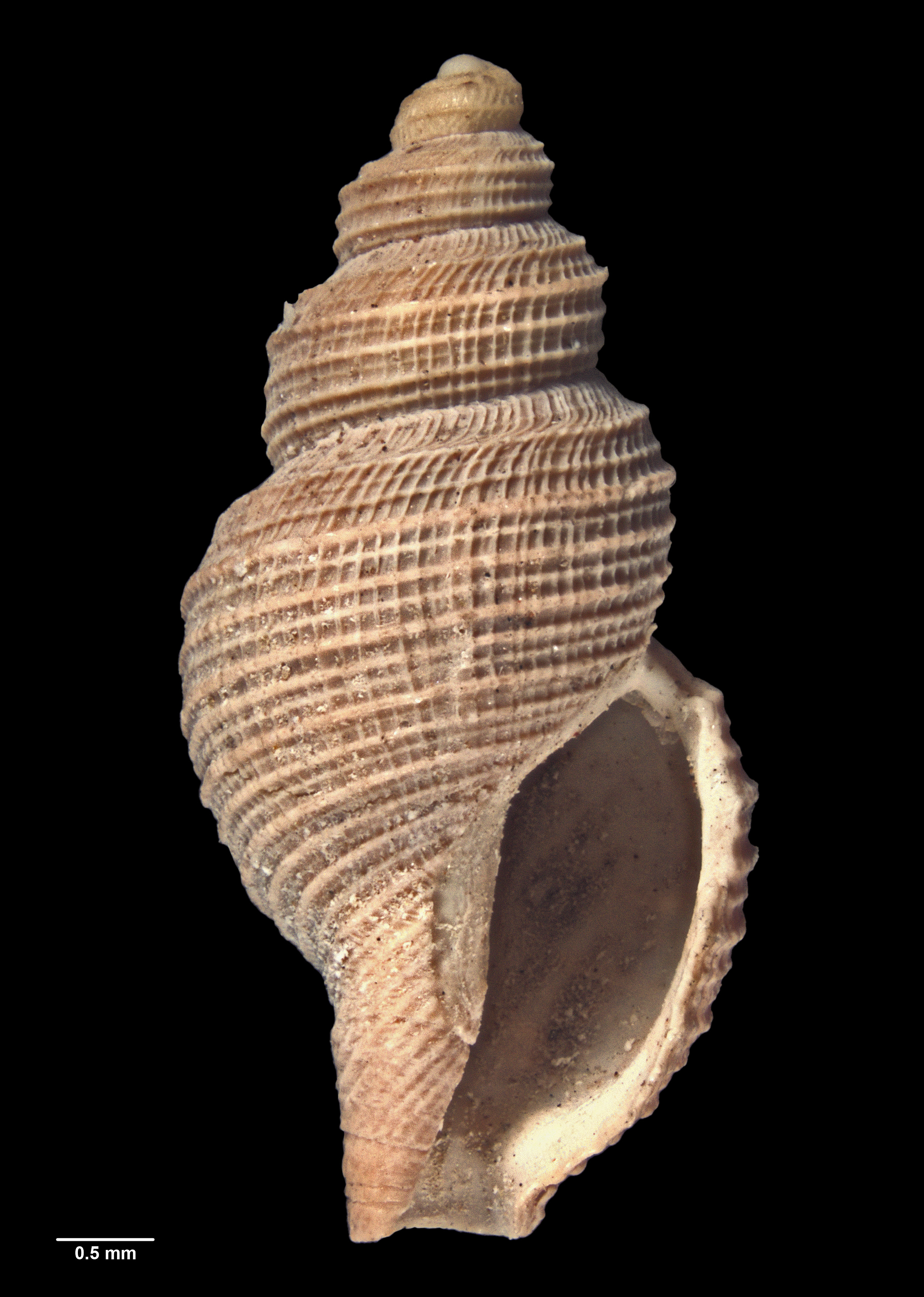
- Holotype of Fenestrodaphne pulchra

Scientific classification
- Kingdom: Animalia
- Phylum: Mollusca
- Class: Gastropoda
- Subclass: Caenogastropoda
- Order: Neogastropoda
- Superfamily: Conoidea
- Genus: †Fenestrodaphne; Powell, 1944
- Species: †F. pulchra

Binomial name
- †Fenestrodaphne pulchra Powell, 1944

= Fenestrodaphne =

Genus of gastropods

Fenestrodaphne is a genus of minute gastropod molluscs belonging to the superfamily Conoidea, currently unassigned to a family. The genus is a monotypic fossil taxon, currently known to only have one member, Fenestrodaphne pulchra. It is known to occur in the middle Miocene in fossil beds of South Australia.

== Description ==
In the original description, Powell described the genus and species as below:

The above new genus is proposed for a solitary Daphnellid which fits no described genus. It is nearest to Asperdaphne, but has a very different protoconch, which is paucispiral, small, rounded, flattened on top, of 1½ whorls, with the tip inrolled. The whole closely axially costate, crossed by two weak spiral keels. The protoconch passes imperceptibly into the post-nuclear sculpture by the addition of spirals, one above and another between the original two. The adult sculpture is of closely spaced, narrow spiral cords and threads, crossed by axial threads. The outer lip is thin, and the sinus sutural, not very deep.
Fenestrodaphne pulchra: Small, ovate, with convex whorl outlines, weakly shouldered on the spire-whorls at about four-fifths whorl height by the uppermost and weakest of four narrow primary spiral cords. There is an intermediate thread in each interspace. On the body-whorl there are ten primary cords, and one, sometimes two, threads in the interspaces. The anterior end bears about ten linear-spaced spiral cords. The surface is delicately fenestrated by the crossing of the secondary spirals and closely spaced axial threads.

The holotype measured 6.1 mm (0.24 in) in height, with a diameter of 3 mm (0.12 in).

== Taxonomy ==
Both the genus and species were first described by A. W. B. Powell in 1944 in the same paper, noting the species' similarity to Asperdaphne. The holotype of the species is held by the Auckland War Memorial Museum. Alan Beu in 2011 also noted the species' similarity to Asperdaphne tasmanica, suggesting that both species may be in the genus Taranis. While part of the superfamily Conoidea, the genus was excluded from the family Turridae by Yu I Kantor et al. in 2024.

== Distribution ==
The species is known to have lived in the Middle Miocene, and has been found in the lower Dry Creek Sands, Metropolitan Abattoirs Bore of the St Vincent Basin, in Adelaide, South Australia, at a depth of between 122–152 m (400–499 ft).

== Gallery ==
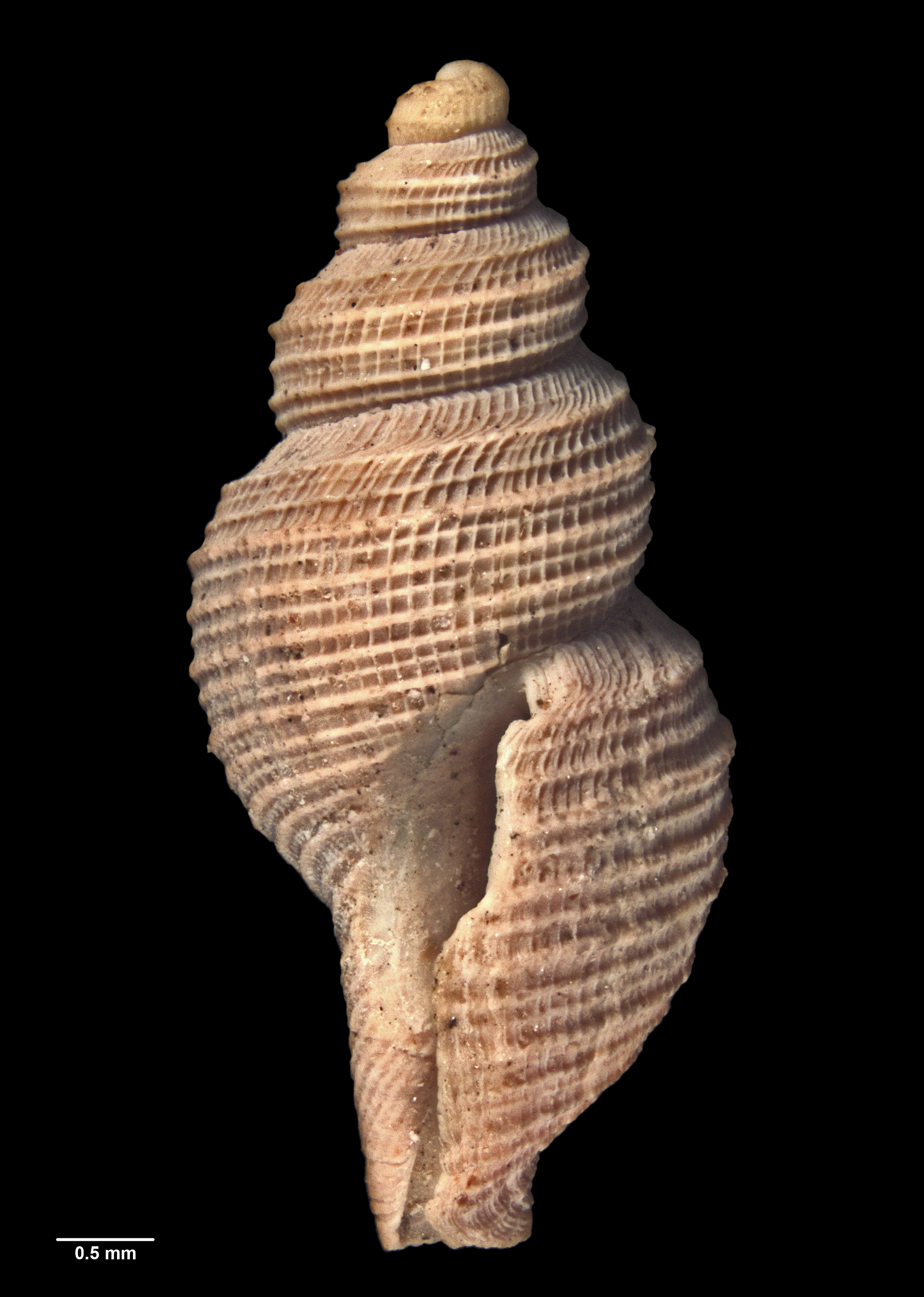
Reverse view of holotype

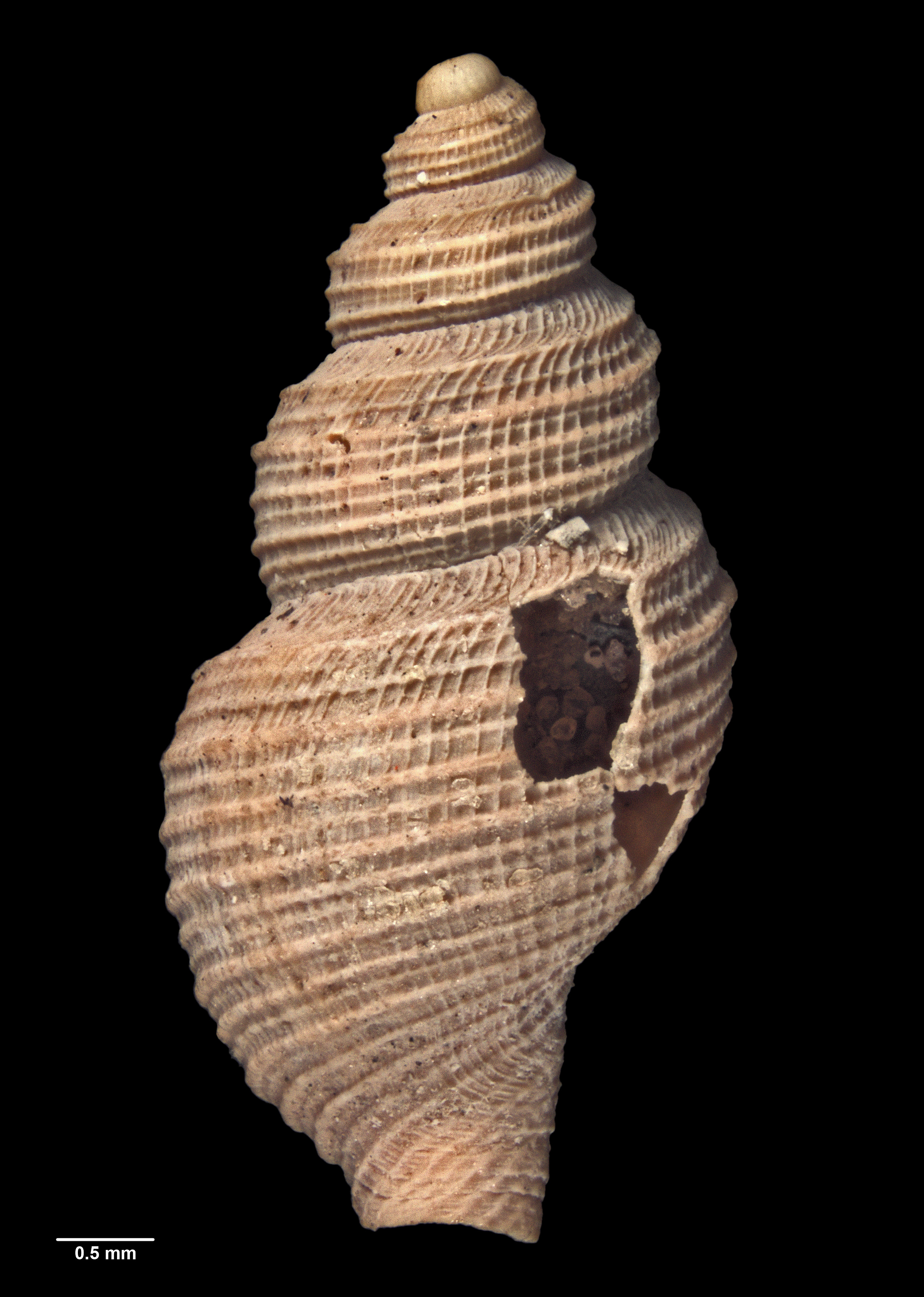
Different view of holotype
