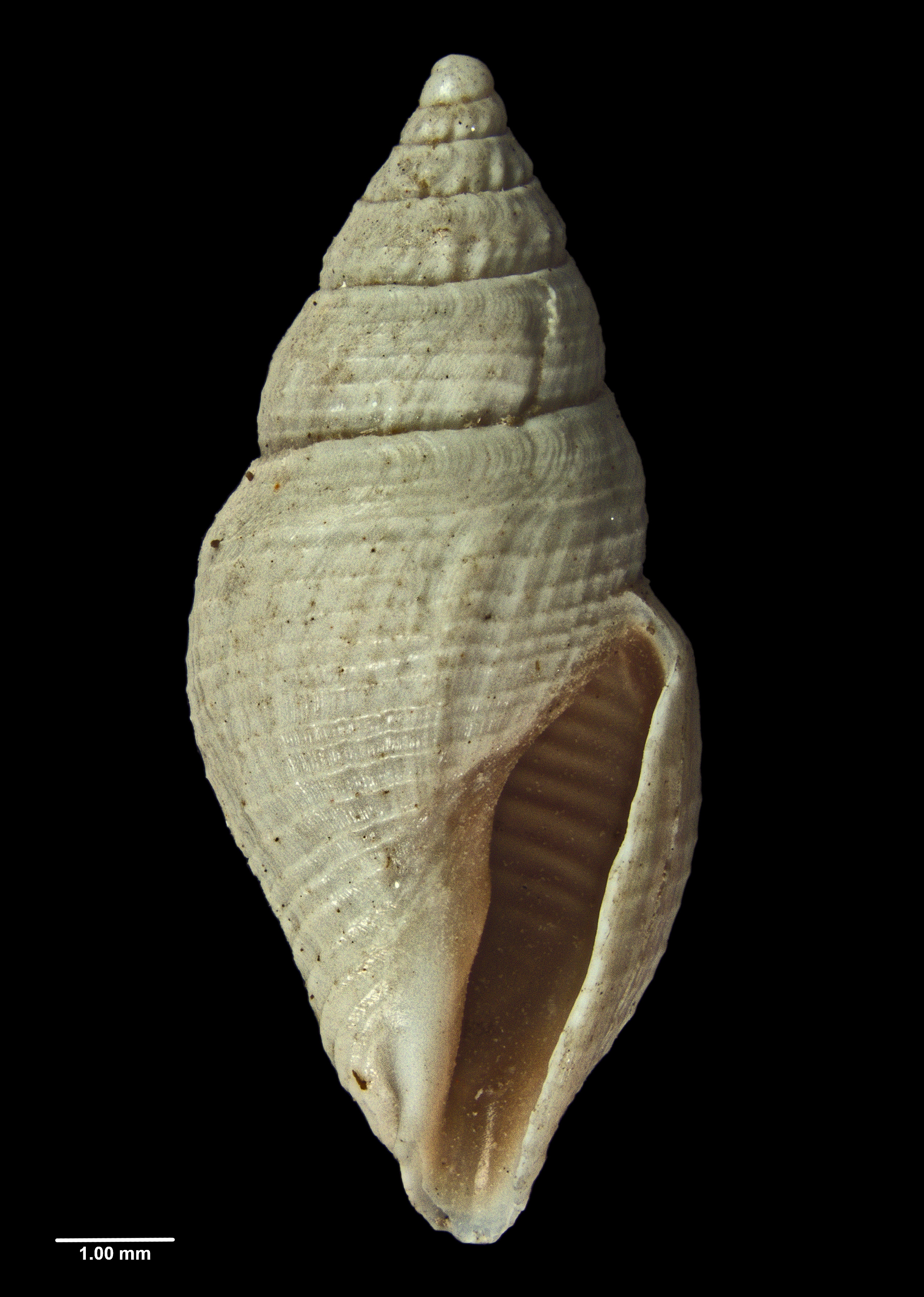
- Holotype

Scientific classification
- Kingdom: Animalia
- Phylum: Mollusca
- Class: Gastropoda
- Subclass: Caenogastropoda
- Order: Neogastropoda
- Superfamily: Conoidea
- Family: incertae sedis
- Genus: †Cryptoborsonia
- Species: †C. pleurotomella

Binomial name
- †Cryptoborsonia pleurotomella A. W. B. Powell, 1944

= Cryptoborsonia pleurotomella =

Extinct species of gastropod

Cryptoborsonia pleurotomella is an extinct species of sea snail, a marine gastropod mollusk, in the superfamily Conoidea, currently unassigned to a family. Dating to the middle Miocene, fossils of the species have been found in the Otway Basin and Port Phillip Basin of Victoria, Australia.

== Description ==
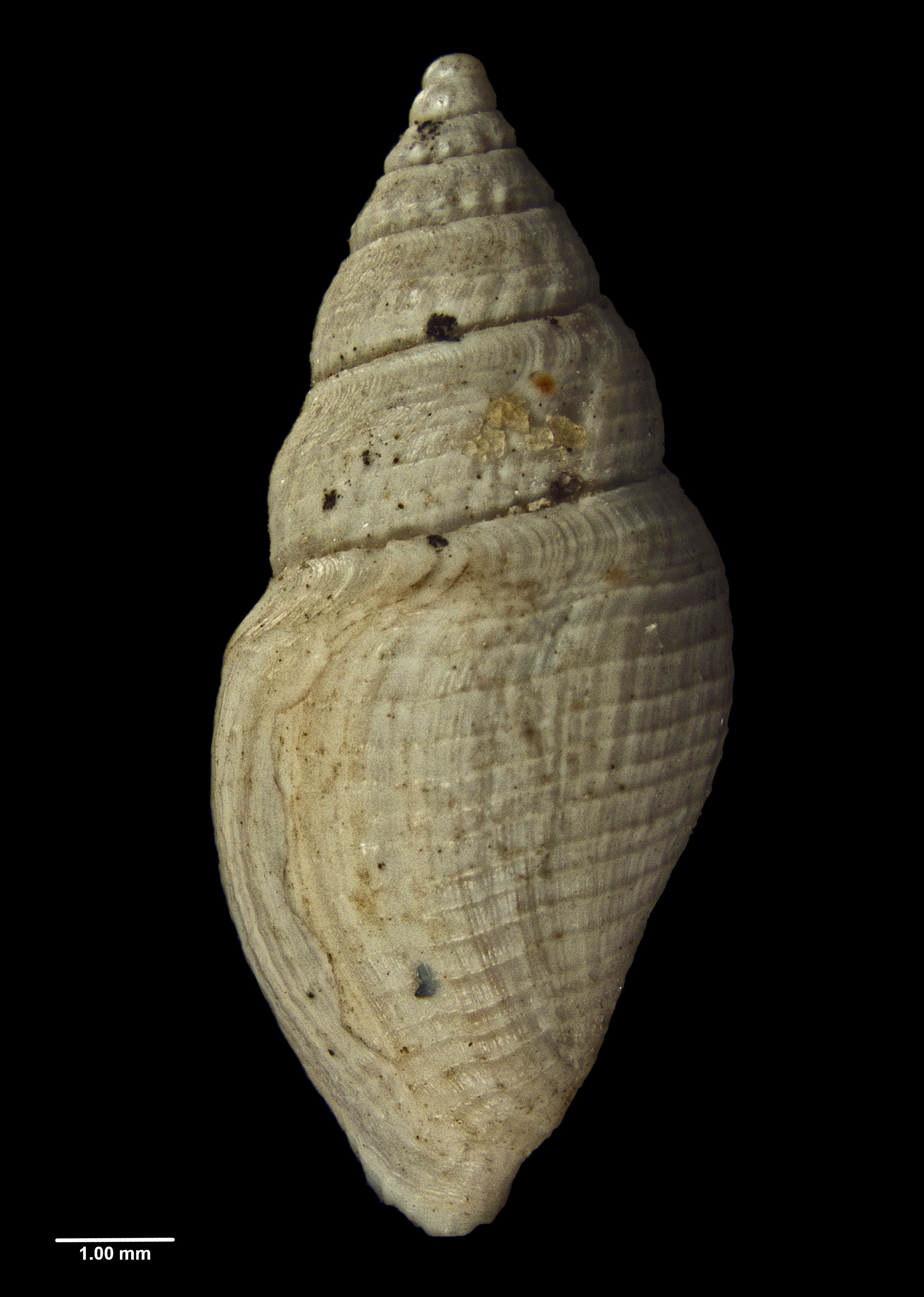
Reverse view of holotype

In the original description, Powell described the species as follows:

Small, biconic, whorls weakly shouldered above middle, aperture half height of shell. Protoconch relatively large, papillate, of two smooth, rounded whorls. Post-nuclear sculpture of wide-spaced, weak, narrow, spiral cords, 4 from shoulder angle to lower suture and 18 on the body-whorl. There are three very weak spiral lirations on the shoulder. Weak axials from the shoulder angle to the lower suture on the first 2½ post-nuclear whorls. Sinus occupying the shoulder, rather deep, arcuate, drawn forwards at the suture and produced forwards below in a broad arcuate sweep. Outer lip thin. Pillar with a median twist-like ridge..

The holotype measured 10 mm (0.39 in) in height and 4.5 mm (0.18 in) in diameter.

== Taxonomy ==
The species was first described by A. W. B. Powell in 1944, in the same paper where he described the genus Cryptoborsonia. The holotype is held by the Auckland War Memorial Museum.

== Distribution ==
C. pleurotomella is found in the Muddy Creek Formation of the Otway Basin in Victoria, and the Gellibrand Formation of the Port Phillip Basin, dating to the middle Miocene. The type location for the species is Balcombe Bay / Jullul Bay.
