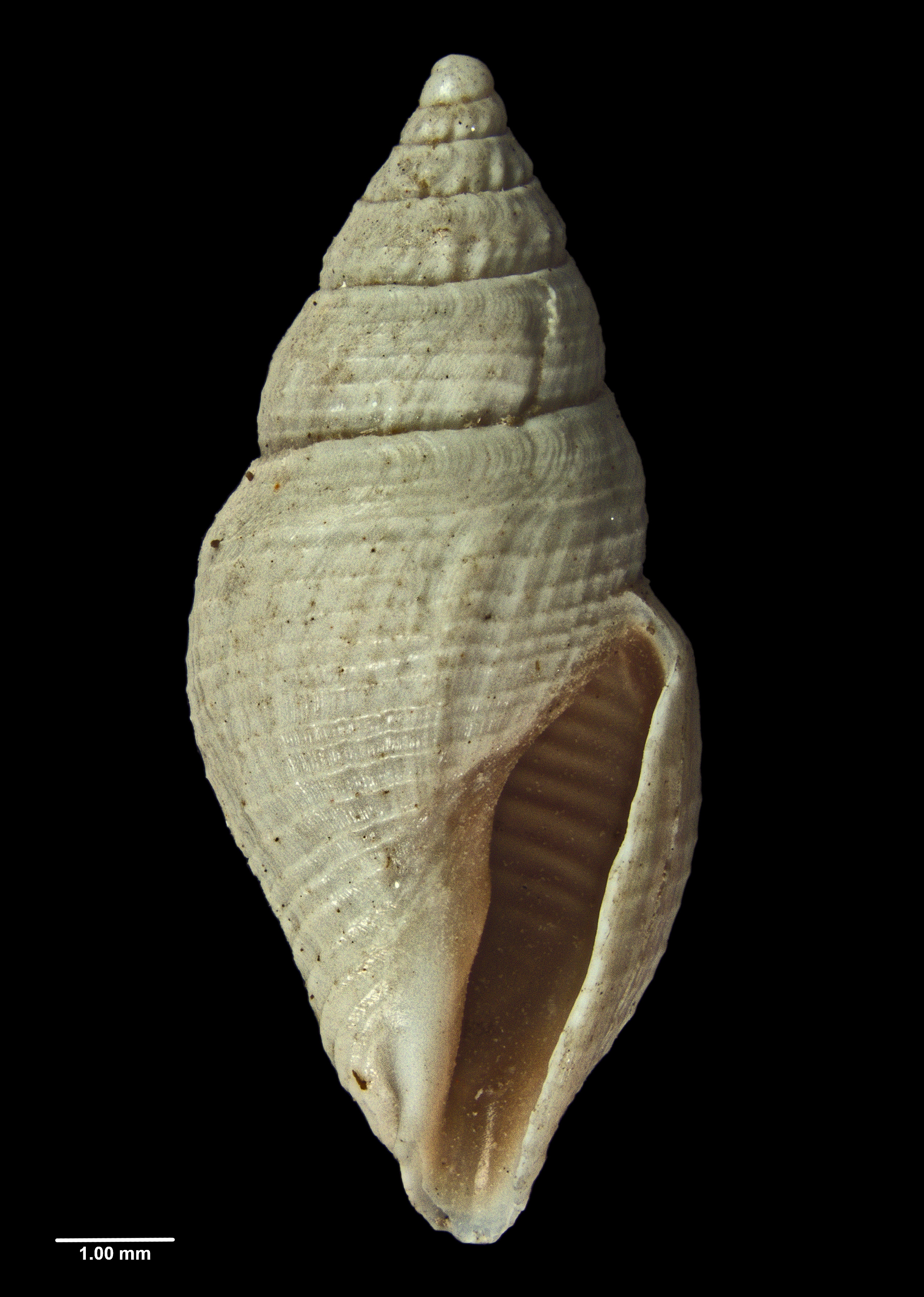
- Holotype of Cryptoborsonia pleurotomella

Scientific classification
- Kingdom: Animalia
- Phylum: Mollusca
- Class: Gastropoda
- Subclass: Caenogastropoda
- Order: Neogastropoda
- Family: incertae sedis
- Genus: †Cryptoborsonia; Powell, 1944

Type species
- Cryptoborsonia pleurotomella

= Cryptoborsonia =

Genus of gastropods

Cryptoborsonia is a genus of minute gastropod molluscs belonging to the superfamily Conoidea, currently unassigned to a family. The genus is a fossil taxon, known to occur between the late Oligocene and the Miocene, and has been found in fossil beds in Victoria, Australia.

== Description ==
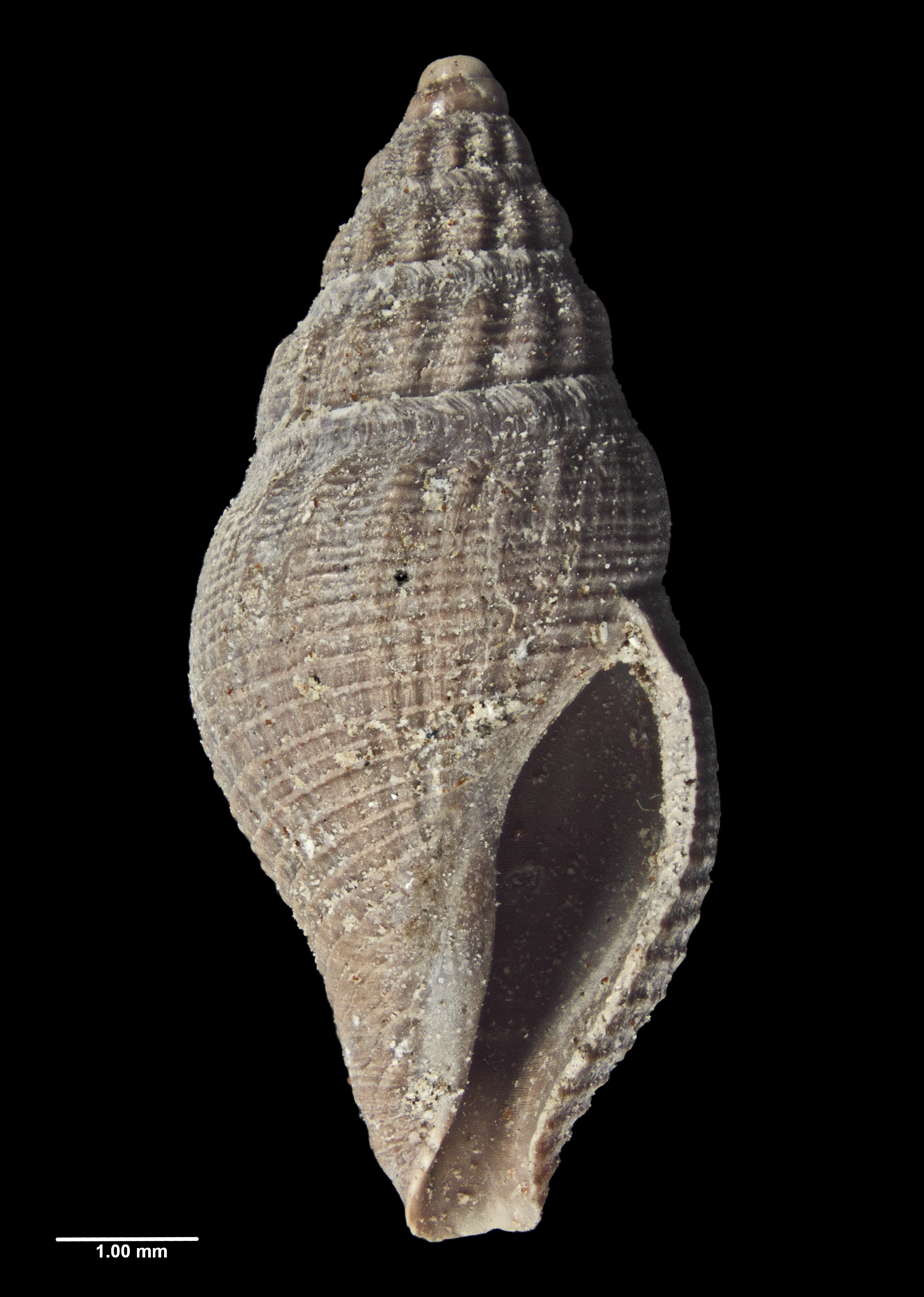
Holotype of C. rugobela

In the original description, Powell described the genus as below:

The sinus is almost sutural, as in Pleurotomella, or similarly as in the Daphnellis genus Rugobela, where the subsutural character of the sinus is masked by a forward trend as the suture. The columella and the protoconch both resemble those of Cryptoconus, the latter is larger and less papillate in Cryptoborsonia.

== Taxonomy ==
The genus was first described by A. W. B. Powell in 1944, naming two species, C. pleurotomella (the type species) and C. rugobela. Powell noted that the genus was problematic to place within extant families, noting some similarities to Cryptoconus, Pleurotomella, Cordieria and Rugobela, and feeling that the twist-like ridge on the two species' pillars made the genus have most in common with Borsonniiae. Holotypes of the two known species are held by the Auckland War Memorial Museum. The genus was placed in the order Neogastropoda by Jack Sepkoski in posthumous work published in 2002, and placed in the superfamily Conoidea but excluded from the family Turridae by Yu I Kantor et al. in 2024.

== Distribution ==
Cryptoborsonia fossils have been found in the Port Phillip Basin, with C. rugobela found in the Jan Juc Formation of the late Oligocene, and C. pleurotomella found in the Muddy Creek Formation of the Otway Basin in Victoria, and the Gellibrand Formation of the Port Phillip Basin, dating to the middle Miocene.

== Species ==
Species within the genus Crassitoniella include:

- † Cryptoborsonia pleurotomella A. W. B. Powell, 1944
- † Cryptoborsonia rugobela A. W. B. Powell, 1944
