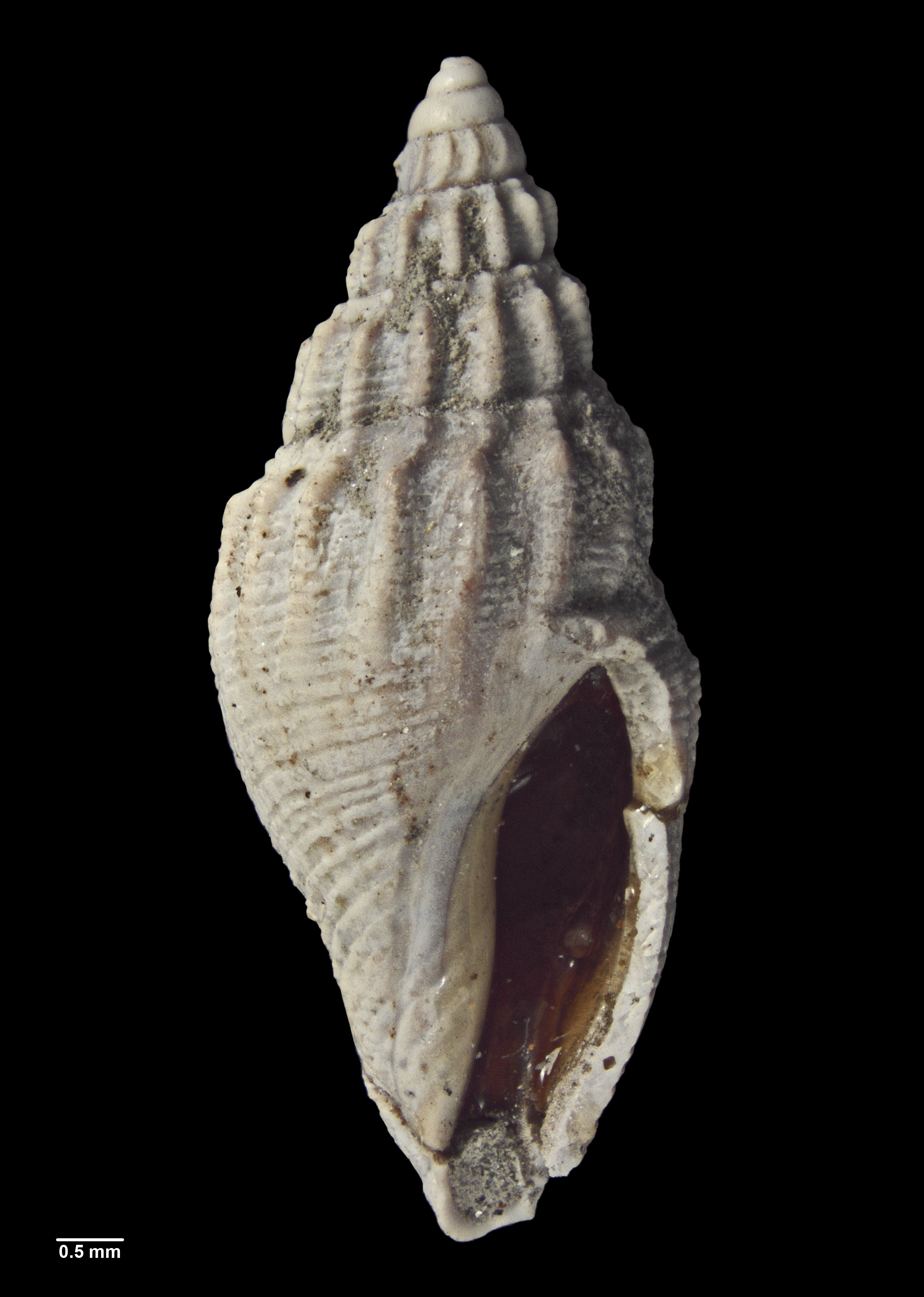
- Rugobela tenuicostata

Scientific classification
- Kingdom: Animalia
- Phylum: Mollusca
- Class: Gastropoda
- Subclass: Caenogastropoda
- Order: Neogastropoda
- Superfamily: Conoidea
- Genus: †Rugobela; H. J. Finlay, 1924

Type species
- Ptychatractus tenuiliratus

= Rugobela =

Rugobela Temporal range: Eocene–Miocene

Genus of gastropods

Rugobela is a genus of minute gastropod molluscs belonging to the superfamily Conoidea, currently unassigned to a family. The genus is a fossil taxon, known to occur between the Eocene and the Miocene, and has been found in fossil beds in Australia and New Zealand.

== Taxonomy ==
The genus was first described by Harold Finlay in 1924, naming Ptychatractus tenuiliratus as the type species. The genus was placed in the subfamily Daphnellinae (of the family Turridae) by A. G. Beu in 1990, and in the order Neogastropoda by Jack Sepkoski in posthumous work published in 2002.

== Distribution ==
Rugobela fossils have been found in Australia and New Zealand, dating to between the Eocene and the Miocene.

== Species ==
Species within the genus Rugobela include:

- † Rugobela canaliculata (Suter, 1917)
- † Rugobela columbelloides (Tenison Woods, 1877)
- † Rugobela exsculpta A. W. B. Powell, 1944
- † Rugobela humerosa (Marwick, 1926)
- † Rugobela infelix (Suter, 1917)
- † Rugobela nodulosa A. W. B. Powell, 1942
- † Rugobela semilaevigata Laws, 1935
- † Rugobela sepelibilis (A. W. B. Powell & Bartrum, 1929)
- † Rugobela tenuicostata Laws, 1935
- † Rugobela tenuilirata (Suter, 1917)
- † Rugobela tersa (Marwick, 1931)
