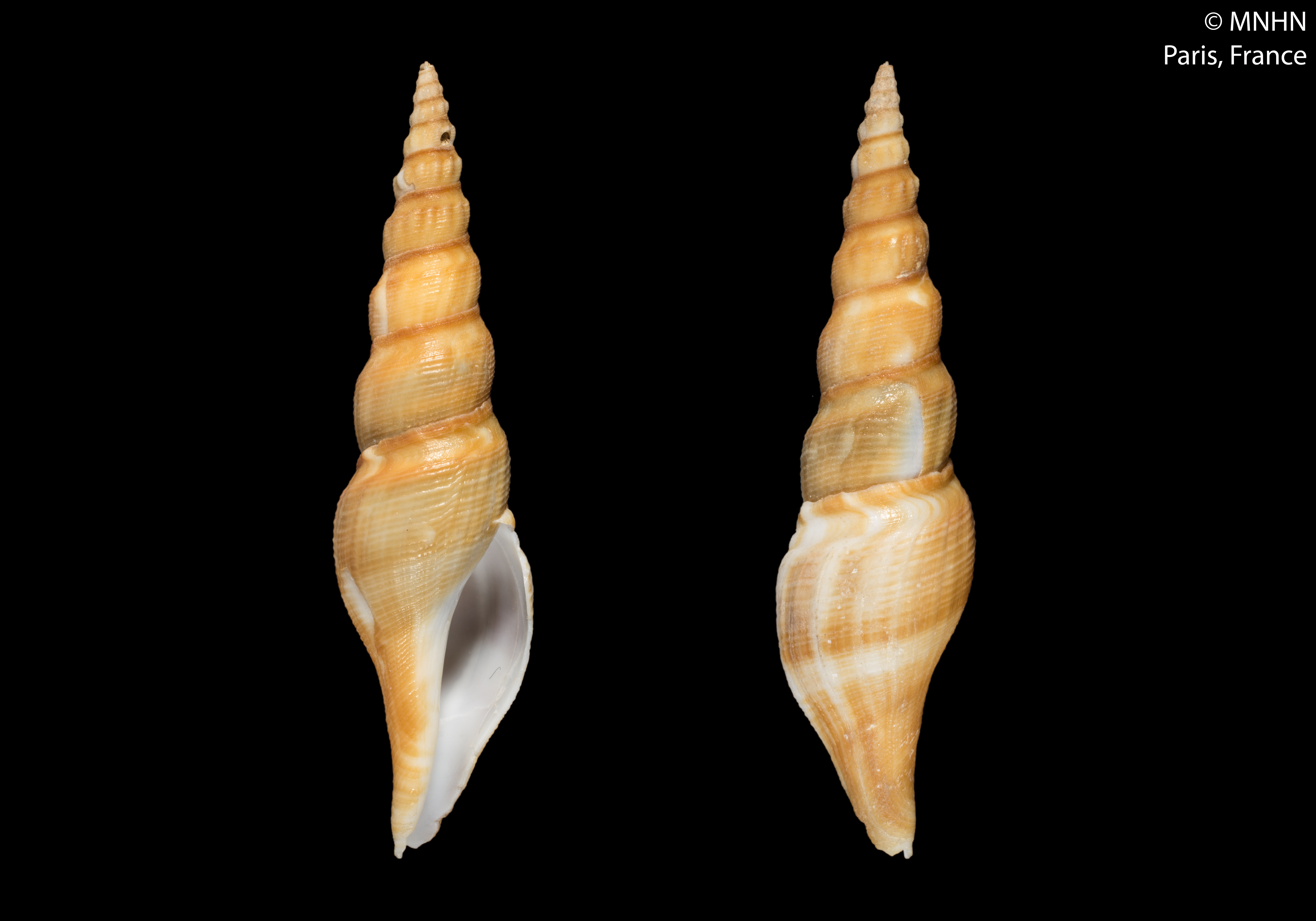
- Shell of Bathyferula delannoyei (holotype at MNHN, Paris)

Scientific classification
- Kingdom: Animalia
- Phylum: Mollusca
- Class: Gastropoda
- Subclass: Caenogastropoda
- Order: Neogastropoda
- Family: incertae sedis
- Genus: Bathyferula
- Species: B. delannoyei

Binomial name
- Bathyferula delannoyei Stahlschmidt, D. Lamy & Fraussen, 2012 (See:IRMNG taxon details)

= Bathyferula delannoyei =

Species of gastropod

Bathyferula delannoyei is a species of deep-water marine gastropod from the Caribbean.

== Etymology and description ==
The species name was derived in honor of a friend, Régis Delannoye from Martinique. There is a debate on the family with Conoidea incertae sedis being used. bathys (Greek), meaning deep. Ferula is Latin and means stake or rod. This is in reference to the shape and colour that resembles a stake of wood. The size can be up to 83.5 millimetres (3.29 in) at depths of up to 750 meters (2,460 ft). While rather large, it would be considered medium compared to the Australian trumpet, Florida horse conch, Giant triton, and the Lightning whelk. It is heavy but slender in shape.

== Distribution ==
This marine species occurs in the Caribbean Sea off Martinique, Guadeloupe, and Saint Martin
