= Philippe Bouchet =

French biologist and malacologist

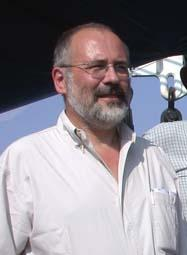
- Philippe Bouchet in May, 2005
- Born: 1953 (age 72–73)
- Scientific career
- Fields: Malacology, taxonomy
- Workplaces: Muséum National d'Histoire Naturelle

Philippe Bouchet (French pronunciation: [filip buʃɛ]; born 1953) is a French biologist whose primary scientific fields of study are malacology (the study of molluscs) and taxonomy. He works at the Muséum National d'Histoire Naturelle in Paris. He is also a Commissioner of the International Commission on Zoological Nomenclature.

Bouchet published Taxonomy of the Gastropoda with the malacologist Jean-Pierre Rocroi in 2005, which laid out a new taxonomy of Gastropod molluscs.

He has named over 500 new taxa of mollusks, with numerous others being named in his honor.

== Professional achievements ==
Bouchet is a senior professor at the Muséum National d'Histoire Naturelle in Paris and is head of the Malacology laboratory and the Taxonomy Collections Unit there. He is also one of the Commissioners of the International Commission on Zoological Nomenclature and has been a member of the ICZN since 1990.

Philippe Bouchet is co-editor of several volumes in the Tropical Deep-Sea Benthos series.

In 2005, Bouchet was the senior author (editor) (with Jean-Pierre Rocroi) of a taxonomy of the Gastropoda, published in a paper entitled "Classification and Nomenclator of Gastropod Families" published in the journal Malacologia.

Bouchet is the head of the 2004 Panglao Marine Biodiversity Project.

== Taxa named, and taxa named in his honor ==
By the end of 2010, Bouchet had described (alone or together with others) more than 500 new species, mainly gastropods. More than 70 new species have been named in his honor. Bouchet was honored with a new genus named after him by Houart & Héros in 2008: Bouchetia. And in 2012, Bouchet was honored by having a monotypic family (and genus) of gastropods named after him: Bouchetispiridae (and Bouchetispira) by Kantor, Strong & Puillandre.

== Awards ==
In 2001 Bouchet was awarded the Marine Sciences Prize of the French Academy of Sciences for his work on the vertical migration of gastropod larvae.

== Publications ==
His publications as author or co-author are numerous. A few examples are listed below:

- P. Bouchet, Revision of the Northeast Atlantic Bathyal and Abyssal Turridae (Mollusca, Gastropoda); J. Mollus. Stud. (1980) 46 (Supplement 8): 1-119. doi:10.1093/mollus/46.Supplement_8.1
- Bouchet Philippe, Taviani Marco (1992). "The Mediterranean deep-sea fauna: pseudopopulations of Atlantic species?". Deep Sea Research Part A. Oceanographic Research Papers. 39 (2): 169–184. Bibcode:1992DSRA...39..169B. doi:10.1016/0198-0149(92)90103-Z.
- P. Bouchet, The magnitude of marine biodiversity, VliZ, 2006 (also as .pdf)
- Bouchet P. & Mermet G. (photographer) (2008). Shells 168 pp., ISBN 978-0-7892-0989-4
- Philippe Bouchet, Hervé Le Guyader et Olivier Pascal, "Des voyages de Cook à l'expédition Santo 2006 : un renouveau des explorations naturalistes des îles du Pacifique", Journal de la Société des Océanistes, 126–127 | Année 2008
