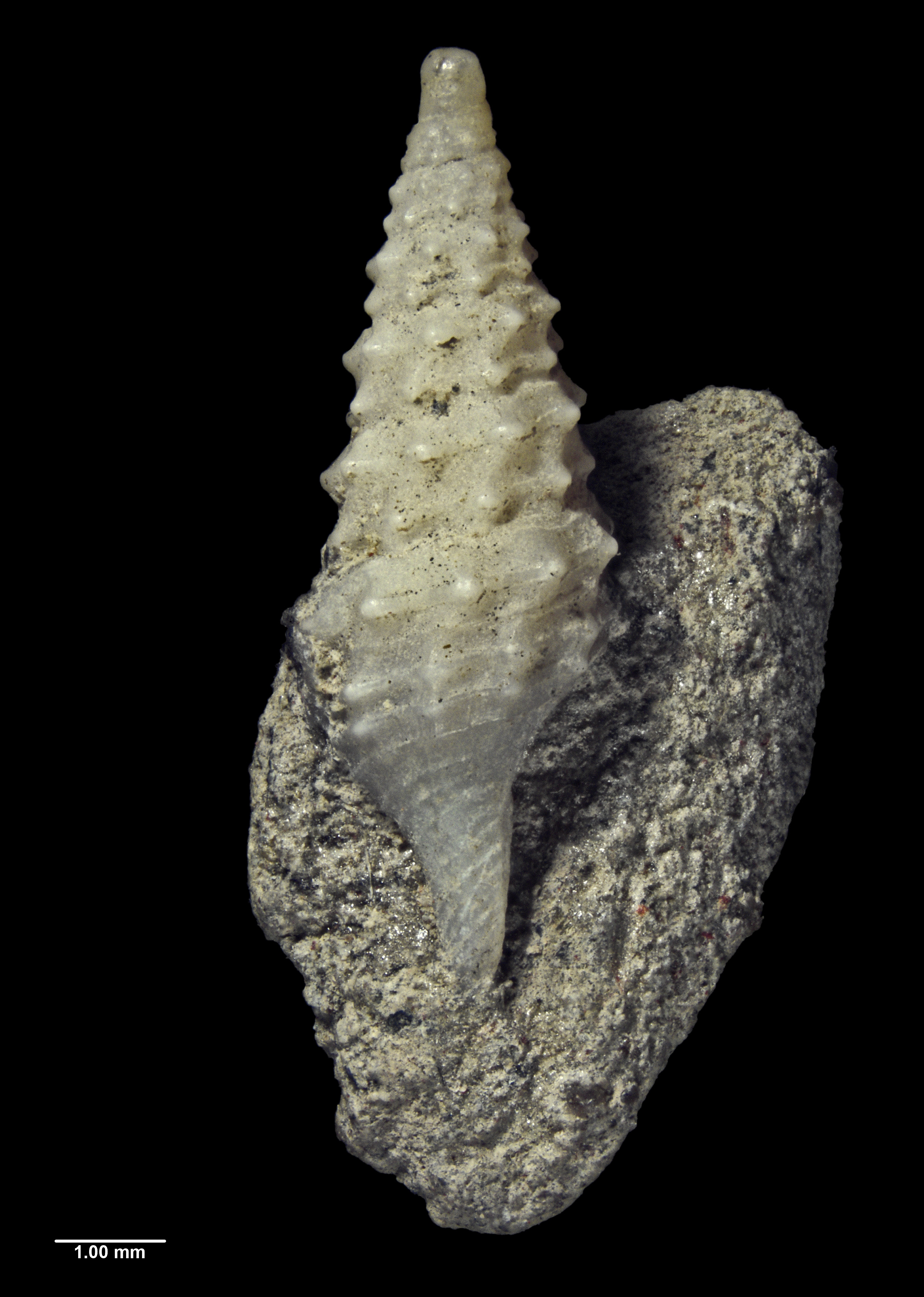
- Holotype from Auckland War Memorial Museum

Scientific classification
- Kingdom: Animalia
- Phylum: Mollusca
- Class: Gastropoda
- Subclass: Caenogastropoda
- Order: Neogastropoda
- Superfamily: Conoidea
- Genus: †Echinoturris; A. W. B. Powell, 1942
- Species: †E. finlayi

Binomial name
- †Echinoturris finlayi (A. W. B. Powell, 1935)

Synonyms
- Turris finlayi A. W. B. Powell, 1935

= Echinoturris =

Echinoturris Temporal range: early Miocene

Extinct species of gastropod

Echinoturris is a genus of minute gastropod molluscs belonging to the superfamily Conoidea, currently unassigned to a family. The genus is a monotypic fossil taxon, currently known to only have one member, Echinoturris finlayi. Fossils of the species date to early Miocene strata of the west coast of the Auckland Region, New Zealand.

== Description ==
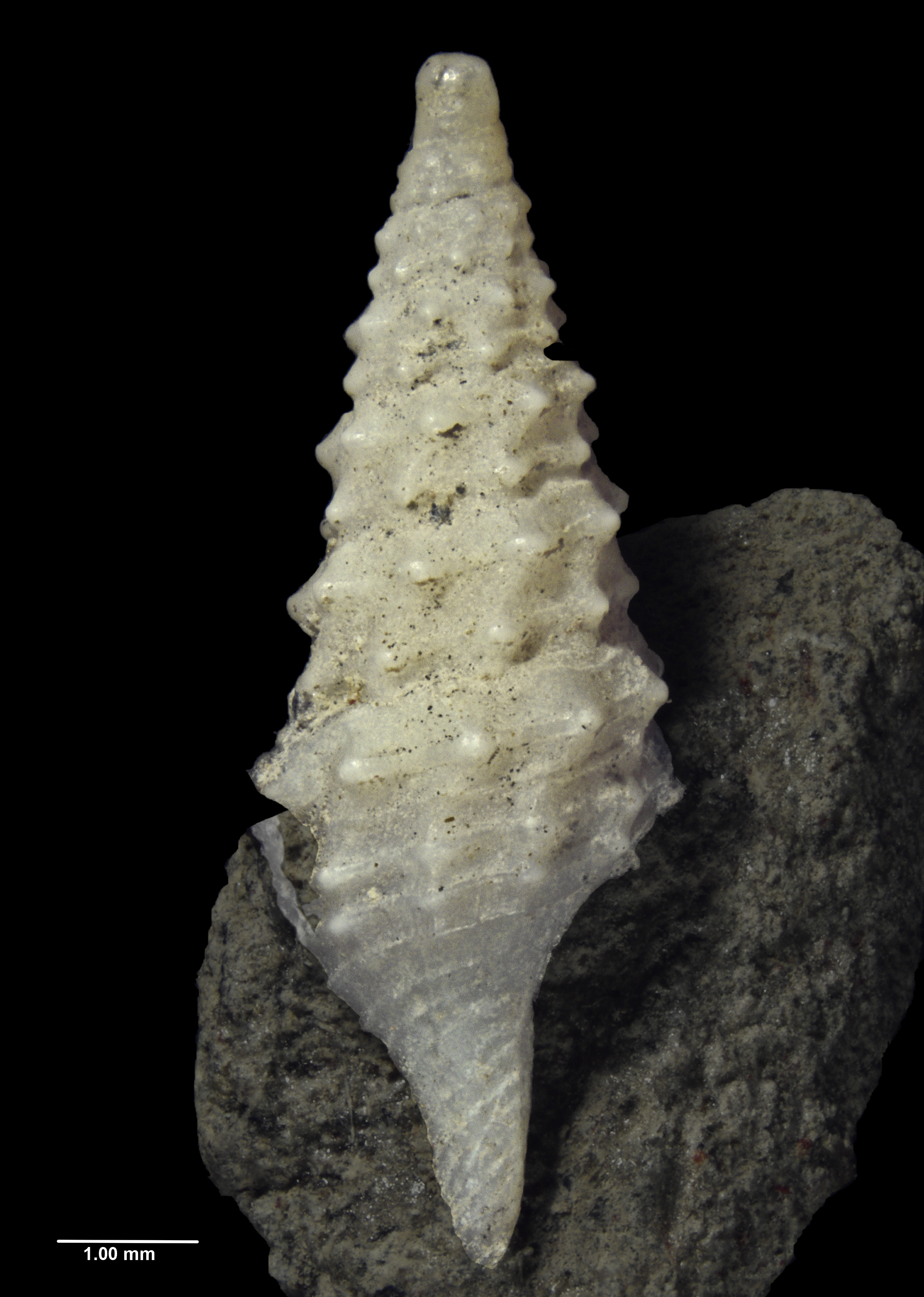
Side view of holotype

Members of the genus have a blunt, smooth, cylindrical-sided, round-topped protoconch of two whorls, which ends with a few thin, closely-spaced axials, a carina with a deep V-shaped sinus in the upper section, and a sparse bicarinate series of prickly nodules. The genus is small in size (ranging from 8–10 mm (0.31–0.39 in)), and can be differentiate from the genera Xenuroturris, Typhlomangelia and Cinguliturris due to having a moderately long canal and bicarinate-spinose sculpture.

The original description for Echinoturris finlayi is as follows:

Shell small, bicarinate, fusiform, slender. Spire tall, higher than aperture plus canal. Whorls 7, including a blunt round-topped cylindrical-sided, smooth protoconch of two whorls, finishing with a few closely spaced thin axials. Spire whorls sculptured with two moderately strong widely spaced keels, which are produced into rounded nodules at the points of intersection with the rather distant protractively oblique axial folds. The distance between the keels is greater than that between either keel and its adjacent suture, and the lower carina is always nearer to the lower suture than is the upper carina to the upper suture. The axial folds number about ten per whorl. Body-whorl with a weak spiral thread between the two keels and ten spiral threads on the base and neck, those on the neck being more closely spaced. Aperture imbedded in matrix, but the growth lines clearly indicate the sinus to be rather deep, V-shaped, and situated on the upper carina.

The holotype of the species measures 8.5 mm (0.33 in) in length and has a diameter of 3.1 mm (0.12 in).

== Taxonomy ==
A. W. B. Powell first described the species as in 1935, provisionally in the genus Turris on the advice of H. J. Finlay, who had been preparing a more comprehensive monograph focused on the Turridae family. Having difficulty placing the species in any known genus, Powell established the genus Echinoturris in 1942. Echinoturris finlayi is the currently accepted name of the species. The holotype was collected by A. W. B. Powell at an unknown date prior to 1935 from between Powell Bay and Bartrum Bay, approximately 2 km (1.2 mi) south of Muriwai (then more commonly known as Motutara), Auckland Region, and is held in the collections of Auckland War Memorial Museum.

The genus was placed in the family Turridae by Powell in 1944, the subfamily Turrinae by Powell in 1966, and in the order Neogastropoda by Jack Sepkoski posthumously in 2002. While P. A. Maxwell retained the genus' position in Turrinae in 2009, currently the genus is unassigned to a family or subfamily within the superfamily Conoidea.

== Ecology ==
E. finlayi was likely a carnivorous sea snail.

== Distribution and habitat ==
This extinct marine species occurs in early Miocene strata of the Nihotupu Formation of New Zealand, on the west coast of the Waitākere Ranges of the Auckland Region, New Zealand. The Powell Bay site where the species' holotype was found were mid-bathyal seafloor 800–2,000 m (2,600–6,600 ft) at the time the Nihotupu Formation was laid down.
