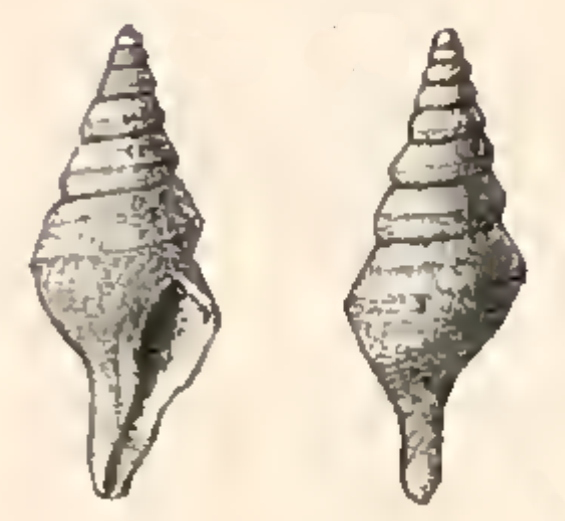
- Shell of Optoturris optatus (holotype)

Scientific classification
- Kingdom: Animalia
- Phylum: Mollusca
- Class: Gastropoda
- Subclass: Caenogastropoda
- Order: Neogastropoda
- Superfamily: Conoidea
- Genus: †Optoturris
- Species: †O. optata

Binomial name
- †Optoturris optata (G.F. Harris, 1897)

Synonyms
- Optoturris optatus (G.F. Harris, 1897); Pleurotoma optata G.F. Harris, 1897

= Optoturris optata =

Optoturris optata Temporal range: Late Oligocene - Late Miocene

Species of gastropod

Optoturris optata is an extinct species of sea snail, a marine gastropod mollusk in the superfamily Conoidea, currently unassigned to a family.

== Description ==
The length of the shell attains 16.5 mm; the maximum diameter is 6 mm; length of the aperture: 9.5 mm.

(Original description) The shell has a fusiform shape. The aperture (with siphonal canal) measures more than ½ the length of the whole shell. The shell contains seven whorls, slightly convex, keeled above and below the suture, which is near the centre of the whorls, the anterior keel being the most prominent. The other ornament consists of several closely-set small spiral lineations, crossed by rather conspicuous growth lines, and accompanied by a peculiar damascened structure. The protoconch is composed of two smooth whorls, the anterior being subangulate and vertically striated It terminates abruptly against the shell of the brephic stage, which is longitudinally, obliquely costated and marginate. The aperture is elongately pyriform, much constricted anteriorly. The outer lip is thin and undulating. The sinus is broad and shallow. The columella is covered by a thin deposit of vertically striated callus and is twisted anteriorly. The siphonal canal is long, curved and broad in front.

== Distribution ==
Fossils of this marine species were found in Miocene strata in Victoria, Australia.
