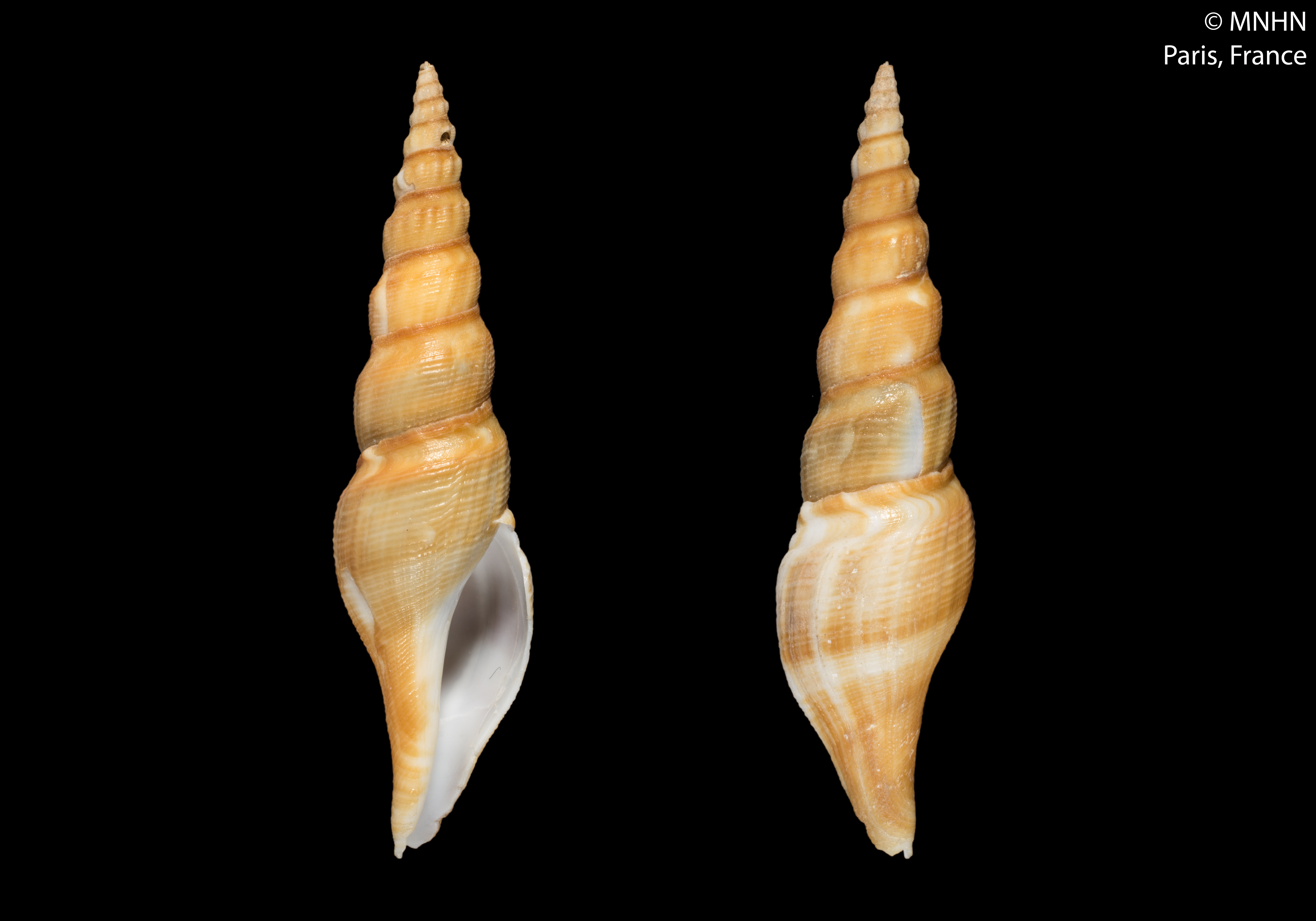
- Shell of Bathyferula delannoyei (holotype at MNHN, Paris)

Scientific classification
- Kingdom: Animalia
- Phylum: Mollusca
- Class: Gastropoda
- Subclass: Caenogastropoda
- Order: Neogastropoda
- Superfamily: Conoidea
- Family: incertae sedis
- Genus: Bathyferula; Stahlschmidt, D. Lamy & Fraussen, 2012

Type species
- Bathyferula delannoyei Stahlschmidt, D. Lamy & Fraussen, 2012

= Bathyferula =

Genus of gastropods

Bathyferula is a genus of sea snails, marine gastropod mollusks, unassigned to a family within the superfamily Conoidea.

== Species ==
Species within the genus Bathyferula include:

- Bathyferula delannoyei Stahlschmidt, D. Lamy & Fraussen, 2012
