= Cryptoconidae =

Scientific classification
- Kingdom: Animalia
- Phylum: Mollusca
- Class: Gastropoda
- Subclass: Caenogastropoda
- Order: Neogastropoda
- Superfamily: Conoidea
- Family: †Cryptoconidae; Cossmann, 1896

Genera
- See text

Extinct family of gastropods

Cryptoconidae is an extinct family of small to medium-sized sea snails, marine gastropod mollusks in the superfamily Conoidea.

== Genera ==
- † Cryptoconus Koenen, 1867
