= Jean-Pierre Rocroi =

French malacologist

Jean-Pierre Rocroi (French pronunciation: [ʒɑ̃ pjɛʁ ʁɔkʁwa]) is a French malacologist, a scientist who studies mollusks. He works at the Muséum national d'histoire naturelle in Paris.

In 2005, he was the junior author (editor) (with Philippe Bouchet) of a new taxonomy of the class Gastropoda, published in a paper titled "Classification and Nomenclator of Gastropod Families" published in the journal Malacologia.
