= Parasyrinx =

Scientific classification
- Kingdom: Animalia
- Phylum: Mollusca
- Class: Gastropoda
- Subclass: Caenogastropoda
- Order: Neogastropoda
- Superfamily: Conoidea
- Family: incertae sedis
- Genus: †Parasyrinx; Finlay, 1924

Type species
- † Pleurotoma alta G. F. Harris, 1897

Synonyms
- † Lirasyrinx Powell, 1942; † Parasyrinx (Lirasyrinx) Powell, 1942

Genus of gastropods

Parasyrinx is a genus of extinct sea snails, marine gastropod mollusks unassigned in the superfamily Conoidea.

== Species ==
Species within the genus Parasyrinx include:

- † Parasyrinx alta (G. F. Harris, 1897)
- † Parasyrinx anomala (Powell, 1942)
- † Parasyrinx powelli P. A. Maxwell, 1992
- † Parasyrinx subalta (P. Marshall & Murdoch, 1919)

Synonyms

- † Parasyrinx (Lirasyrinx) powelli P. A. Maxwell, 1992: synonym of † Parasyrinx powelli P. A. Maxwell, 1992
- † Parasyrinx finlayi R. S. Allan, 1926: synonym of † Cochlespira maorum (P. Marshall & Murdoch, 1923)
