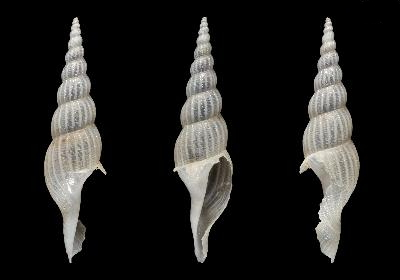
- Shells of Bouchetispira vitrea (holotype in the MNHN, Paris)

Scientific classification
- Kingdom: Animalia
- Phylum: Mollusca
- Class: Gastropoda
- Subclass: Caenogastropoda
- Order: Neogastropoda
- Superfamily: Conoidea
- Family: Bouchetispiridae; Kantor, E. E. Strong & Puillandre, 2012
- Genus: Bouchetispira; Kantor, E. E. Strong & Puillandre, 2012

Type species
- Bouchetispira vitrea Kantor, E. E. Strong & Puillandre, 2012

= Bouchetispira =

Genus of gastropods

Bouchetispira is a genus of sea snails. The genus Bouchetispira is the only genus in the family Bouchetispiridae. The scientific name of the genus and family are in honour of Philippe Bouchet, a French taxonomist and malacologist.

== Species ==
- Bouchetispira ponderi Hallan, Criscione, Fedosov & Puillandre, 2019
- Bouchetispira vitrea Kantor, E. E. Strong & Puillandre, 2012
