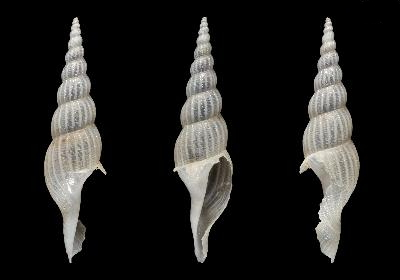
- Shells of Bouchetispira vitrea (holotype in the MNHN, Paris)

Scientific classification
- Kingdom: Animalia
- Phylum: Mollusca
- Class: Gastropoda
- Subclass: Caenogastropoda
- Order: Neogastropoda
- Family: Bouchetispiridae
- Genus: Bouchetispira
- Species: B. vitrea

Binomial name
- Bouchetispira vitrea Kantor, Strong & Puillandre, 2012

= Bouchetispira vitrea =

Species of gastropod

Bouchetispira vitrea is a species of sea snail.

== Description ==
Bouchetispira vitrea has a thin, translucent shell up to 30 millimetres (1.2 in) long, with orthocline ribs. The specific name vitrea is from the Latin word vitrum, which means "glass", referring to the translucent appearance of the shell.

== Distribution ==
The species was found on an isolated seamount off New Caledonia, and is probably a survivor of a larger clade.
