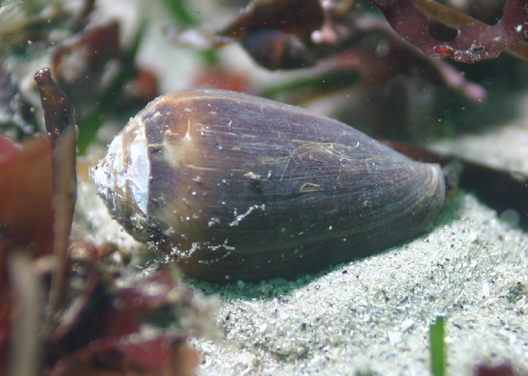
- A live Californiconus californicus, in situ, anterior end on the right

Scientific classification
- Kingdom: Animalia
- Phylum: Mollusca
- Class: Gastropoda
- Subclass: Caenogastropoda
- Order: Neogastropoda
- Superfamily: Conoidea; Fleming, 1822

Families
- See text

= Conoidea =

Conoidea Temporal range: Cenozoic (Danian to Holocene), 66–0 Ma

Superfamily of predatory sea snails

Conoidea is a superfamily of predatory sea snails, marine gastropod mollusks within the suborder Hypsogastropoda. This superfamily is a very large group of marine mollusks, estimated at 340 recent valid genera and subgenera, and considered by one authority to contain 4,000 named living species.

This superfamily includes the turrids, the terebras (also known as auger snails or auger shells) and the cones or cone snails. The phylogenetic relationships within this superfamily are poorly established. Several families (especially the Turridae), subfamilies and genera are thought to be polyphyletic.

In contrast to Puillandre's estimate, Bandyopadhyay et al. (2008) estimated that the superfamily Conoidea contains about 10,000 species. Tucker (2004) even speaks of 11,350 species in the group of taxa commonly referred to as turrids. 3000 recent taxa are potentially valid species. Little more than half of the known taxa are fossil species. Many species are little known and need more investigation to find their exact systematic place.

Most species in this superfamily are small to medium in size, with shell lengths between 3 mm and 50 mm. They occur in diverse marine habitats from tropical waters to the poles, in shallow or deep waters, and on hard to soft substrates.

In 2009, a proposed new classification of this superfamily was published by John K. Tucker and Manuel J. Tenorio. In 2011, a new classification of this superfamily was published by Bouchet et al. Both classifications were based upon cladistical analyses and included modern taxonomic molecular phylogeny studies.

== Morphology ==
The shells of Conoidea can be classified into three categories:

- the conical shells of Conidae, with a low spire, a high last adult whorl and a narrow slit-like aperture;
- the tall shells of Terebridae, with a tall multi-whorled spire, a low aperture and a very short siphonal canal;
- and the intermediate shapes in the remaining Conoidea, also known as "turrids". Unlike the previous categories, turrids are not a monophyletic taxon, comprising multiple families of multiple lineages (though historically, they were indeed all classified as Turridae).The superfamily is known for its toxoglossan radula, which is used to inject powerful neurotoxins into its prey. This makes these species powerful carnivorous predators on annelids, other molluscs and even fish. However, members of various families have lost the venom gland and often also the radula.

Within the superfamily there are four somewhat different varieties of radula. The radula types are as follows:

- Type 1 Drilliidae type: five teeth in each row with comb-like lateral teeth and flat-pointed marginal teeth
- Type 2 Turridae s.l. type: two or three teeth in a row with the marginal teeth being of the duplex or wishbone form
- Type 3 Pseudomelatomidae type: two or three teeth in a row with curved and solid marginal teeth
- Type 4 hypodermic type: two hollow, enrolled, marginal teeth in each row with an absent or reduced radular membrane

== Families ==
=== 1993 taxonomy ===
Families and subfamilies included within the superfamily Conoidea according to Taylor, et al. 1993

- Clavatulidae Clay, 1853
- Conidae Fleming, 1822
  - Coninae – cone snails
  - Clathurellinae
  - Conorbiinae
  - Mangeliinae
  - Oenopotinae
  - Raphitominae
- Drilliidae Olsson, 1964
- Pseudomelatomidae Morrison, 1964
- Strictispiridae McLean, 1971
- Terebridae Mörch, 1852 – auger shells
- Turridae H. Adams & A. Adams, 1853 (1838) – turrids

This same classification was accepted by Bouchet & Rocroi in 2005.

=== 2009 taxonomy ===
In 2009 John K. Tucker and Manuel J. Tenorio proposed a classification system for the cone shells and their allies (which resorb their inner walls during growth) based upon a cladistical analysis of anatomical characters including the radular tooth, the morphology (i.e. shell characters), as well as an analysis of prior molecular phylogeny studies, all of which were used to construct phylogenetic trees. In their phylogeny, Tucker and Tenorio noted the close relationship of the cone species within the various clades, corresponding to their proposed families and genera; this also corresponded to the results of prior molecular studies by Puillandre et al. and others. This 2009 proposed classification system also outlined the taxonomy for the other clades of Conoidean gastropods (that do not resorb their inner walls), also based upon morphological, anatomical, and molecular studies, and removes the turrid snails (which are a distinct large and diverse group) from the cone snails and creates a number of new families. For Tucker and Tenorio's classification system for the cone shells and their allies (and the other clades of Conoidean gastropods) see Tucker & Tenorio cone snail taxonomy 2009.

=== 2011 taxonomy ===
The original classification, Taylor et al. 1993 (and Bouchet & Rocroi in 2005) was thoroughly changed by the publication in 2011 of the article. The authors presented a new classification of the Conoidea on the genus level, based on anatomical characters but also on the molecular phylogeny as presented by Puillandre N., et al., 2008. They recognize fifteen families: Conidae, Terebridae, and the polyphyletic family Turridae resolved into 13 monophyletic families (containing 358 currently recognized genera and subgenera). The authors follow tentatively the classification for the family Conidae as presented by Tucker & Tenorio, 2009 who divided the monogeneric family Conidae into 82 genera. However, there is no final opinion on this issue yet, as a new molecular phylogeny of the Conidae is in preparation. There are a number of genera within the Conoidea that could not be assigned to any family.

In 2012, a new lineage in the Conoidea was revealed, leading to the creation of a new family Bouchetispiridae Kantor, Strong & Puillandre, 2012 that includes one genus Bouchetispira Kantor, Strong & Puillandre, 2012 and one species Bouchetispira vitrea Kantor, Strong & Puillandre, 2012, which was found on an isolated sea mount off New Caledonia. This is probably the sole survivor of a larger clade.

== Recognized families in the Conoidea (as of 2025) ==
- Borsoniidae Bellardi, 1875
- Bouchetispiridae Kantor, Strong & Puillandre, 2012
- Clathurellidae H. Adams & A. Adams, 1858
- Clavatulidae Gray, 1853
- Cochlespiridae Powell, 1942
- Conidae Fleming, 1822
- Conorbidae de Gregorio, 1880
- †Cryptoconidae Cossmann, 1896
- Drilliidae Olsson, 1964
- Fusiturridae Abdelkrim, Aznar-Cormano, Fedosov, Kantor, Lozouet, Phuong, Zaharias & Puillandre, 2018
- Horaiclavidae Bouchet, Kantor, Sysoev & Puillandre, 2011
- Mangeliidae P. Fischer, 1883
- Marshallenidae Abdelkrim, Aznar-Cormano, Fedosov, Kantor, Lozouet, Phuong, Zaharias & Puillandre, 2018
- Mitromorphidae Casey, 1904
- Pseudomelatomidae Morrison, 1966
- †Pseudotomidae Bellardi, 1875
- Raphitomidae Bellardi, 1875
- Strictispiridae McLean, 1971
- Terebridae Mörch, 1852
- Turridae H. Adams & A. Adams, 1853 (1838)

Conoidea (unassigned)

Genera not assigned to a family:

- †Amuletum Stephenson, 1941
- †Austroclavus Powell, 1942
- Bathyferula Stahlschmidt, Lamy & Fraussen, 2012
- †Campylacrum Finlay & Marwick, 1937
- †Clinuropsis Vincent, 1913
- †Cosmasyrinx Marwick, 1931
- †Cryptoborsonia Powell, 1944
- Cryptomella Finlay, 1924
- Echinoturris Powell, 1935
- Eoscobinella Powell, 1942
- † Eopleurotoma Cossmann, 1889
- †Eothesbia Finlay & Marwick, 1937
- †Eoturris Finlay & Marwick, 1937
- †Fenestrodaphne Powell, 1944
- Hemipleurotoma Cossmannn, 1889
- † Ingaunoturricula M. P. Bernasconi & Robba, 1984
- †Insolentia Finlay, 1926
- Mangaoparia Vella, 1954
- Maoricrassus Vella, 1954
- †Moniliopsis Cossmann, 1918
- † Muteluma Kiel & Bandel, 2003
- † Nodisurculina Petuch, 1988
- † Optoturris A.W.B. Powell, 1944
- †Orthosurcula Casey, 1904
- † Oxyacrum Cossmann, 1889
- Parasyngenochilus Long, 1981
- †Parasyrinx Finlay, 1924
- †Rugobela Finlay, 1924
- Sinistrella Meyer, 1887
- †Syngenochilus Powell, 1944
- Tahudrillia Powell, 1942
- †Turrinosyrinx Hickman, 1976
- Veruturris Powell, 1944

Families and subfamilies brought into synonymy

- Acusidae Gray, 1853: synonym of Terebridae Mörch, 1852
- Clavidae Casey, 1904: synonym of Drilliidae Olsson, 1964
- Clionellidae Stimpson, 1865: synonym of Clavatulidae Gray, 1853
- Conilithidae Tucker & Tenorio, 2009: synonym of Conidae Fleming, 1822
- Crassispirinae McLean, 1971: synonym of Pseudomelatomidae Morrison, 1966
- Cytharinae Thiele, 1929: synonym of Mangeliidae P. Fischer, 1883
- Daphnellinae Casey, 1904: synonym of Raphitomidae Bellardi, 1875
- Diptychomitrinae L. Bellardi, 1888: synonym of Mitromorphidae Casey, 1904
- Melatomidae Gill, 1871: synonym of Clavatulidae Gray, 1853
- Mitrolumnidae Sacco, 1904: synonym of Mitromorphidae Casey, 1904
- Oenopotinae Bogdanov, 1987: synonym of Mangeliidae P. Fischer, 1883
- Pervicaciidae Rudman, 1969: synonym of Terebridae Mörch, 1852
- Pleurotomellinae F. Nordsieck, 1968: synonym of Raphitomidae Bellardi, 1875
- Pleurotomidae: synonym of Turridae H. Adams & A. Adams, 1853 (1838)
- Pusionellinae Gray, 1853: synonym of Clavatulidae Gray, 1853
- Taraninae Casey, 1904: synonym of Raphitomidae Bellardi, 1875
- Taranteconidae Tucker & Tenorio, 2009: synonym of Conidae Fleming, 1822
- Thatcheriidae Powell, 1942: synonym of Raphitomidae Bellardi, 1875
- Turriculinae Powell, 1942: synonym of Clavatulidae Gray, 1853
- Zemaciinae Sysoev, 2003: synonym of Borsoniidae Bellardi, 1875
- Zonulispirinae McLean, 1971: synonym of Pseudomelatomidae Morrison, 1966

Genera (not assigned to a family) brought into synonymy

- †Acamptogenotia Rovereto, 1899: synonym of †Pseudotoma Bellardi, 1875
- Defrancia Millet, 1826: synonym of Pleurotomoides Bronn, 1831
- Fusosurcula Is. Taki, 1951: synonym of †Orthosurcula Casey, 1904
- †Lirasyrinx Powell, 1942: synonym of †Parasyrinx Finlay, 1924
- †Tholitoma Finlay & Marwick, 1937: synonym of †Cosmasyrinx (Tholitoma) Finlay & Marwick, 1937 represented as †Cosmasyrinx Marwick, 1931
- †Waitara Marwick, 1931: synonym of Thatcheria Angas, 1877
