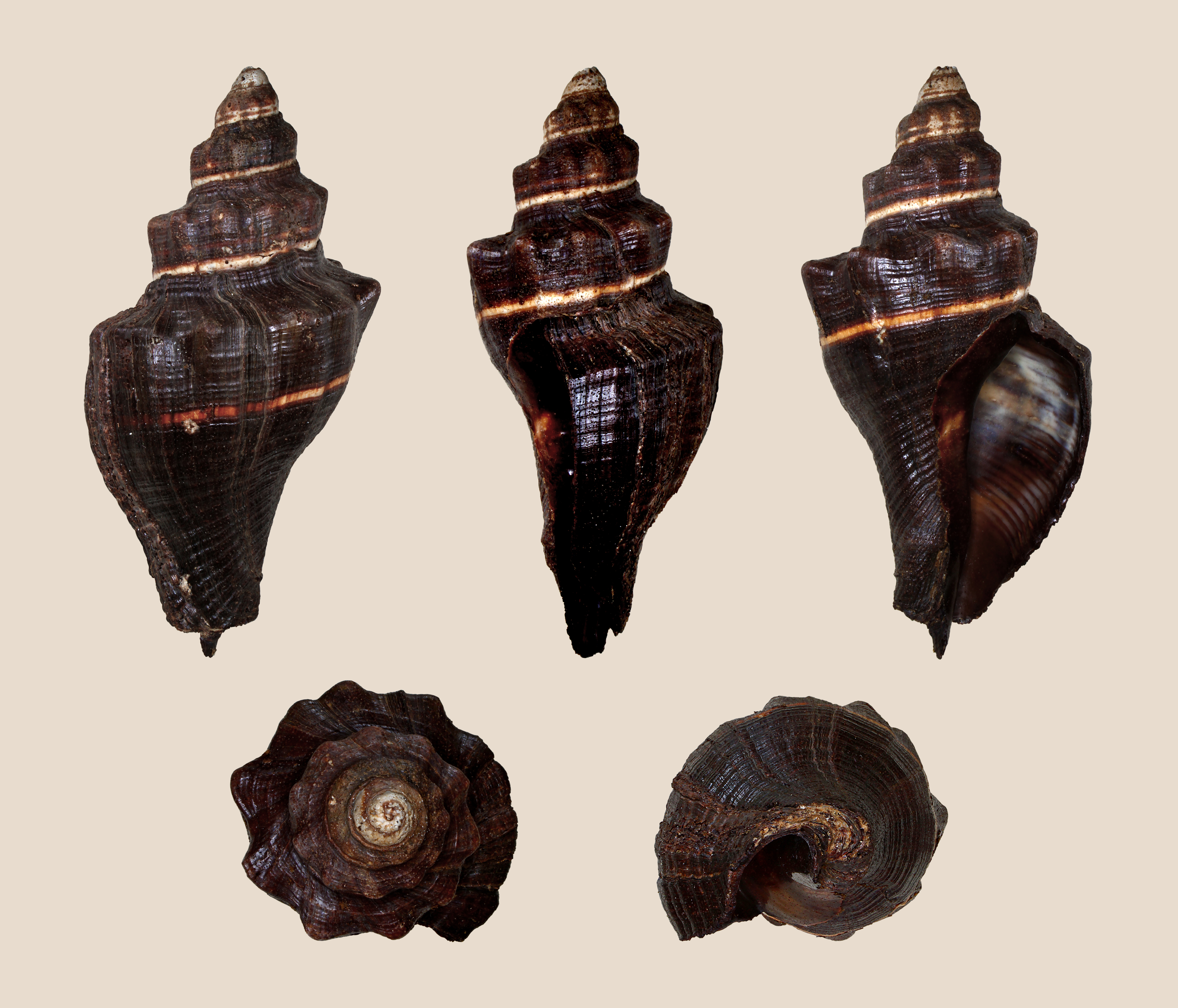
- Five views of a shell of Pugilina morio

Scientific classification
- Kingdom: Animalia
- Phylum: Mollusca
- Class: Gastropoda
- Subclass: Caenogastropoda
- Order: Neogastropoda
- Family: Melongenidae
- Genus: Pugilina; Schumacher, 1817

Type species
- Murex morio Linnaeus, 1758

Synonyms
- Cassidulus Gray, 1854 (invalid: junior homonym of Cassidulus Lamarck, 1801 [Echinodermata])

= Pugilina =

Genus of gastropods

Pugilina is a genus of large sea snails, marine gastropod mollusks in the family Melongenidae, the crown conches and their allies.

== Species ==
Species within the genus Pugilina include:

- Pugilina elongata nhatrangensis Thach, 2018 (parent: Brunneifusus ternatanus (Gmelin, 1791))
- † Pugilina erecta Vermeij & Raven, 2009
- † Pugilina katalinae Kovács & Vicián, 2016
- Pugilina morio (Linnaeus, 1758)
- † Pugilina paraguanensis Landau & Vermeij, 2013
- Pugilina tupiniquim Abbate & Simone, 2015

Species brought into synonymy

- Subgenus Pugilina (Hemifusus) Swainson, 1840: synonym of Hemifusus Swainson, 1840
- Pugilina carnaria Röding, 1798: synonym of Volegalea carnaria (Röding, 1798)
- Pugilina cochlidium (Linnaeus, 1758): synonym of Volegalea cochlidium (Linnaeus, 1758)
- Pugilina colosseus Lamarck, 1816: synonym of Hemifusus colosseus (Lamarck, 1816)
- Pugilina crassicaudus Philippi, 1849: synonym of Hemifusus crassicauda (Philippi, 1849)
- Pugilina dirki Nolf, 2007: synonym of Volegalea dirki (Nolf, 2007)
- Pugilina kawamurai: synonym of Hemifusus kawamurai T. Kira, 1965
- Pugilina laevis Schumacher, 1817: synonym of Volema pyrum (Gmelin, 1791)
- Pugilina pugilina (Born, 1778): synonym of Volegalea cochlidium (Linnaeus, 1758)
- Pugilina ternatanus (Gmelin, 1791): synonym of Hemifusus ternatanus (Gmelin, 1791): synonym of Brunneifusus ternatanus (Gmelin, 1791)
- Pugilina tuba Gmelin, 1791: synonym of Hemifusus tuba (Gmelin, 1791)
