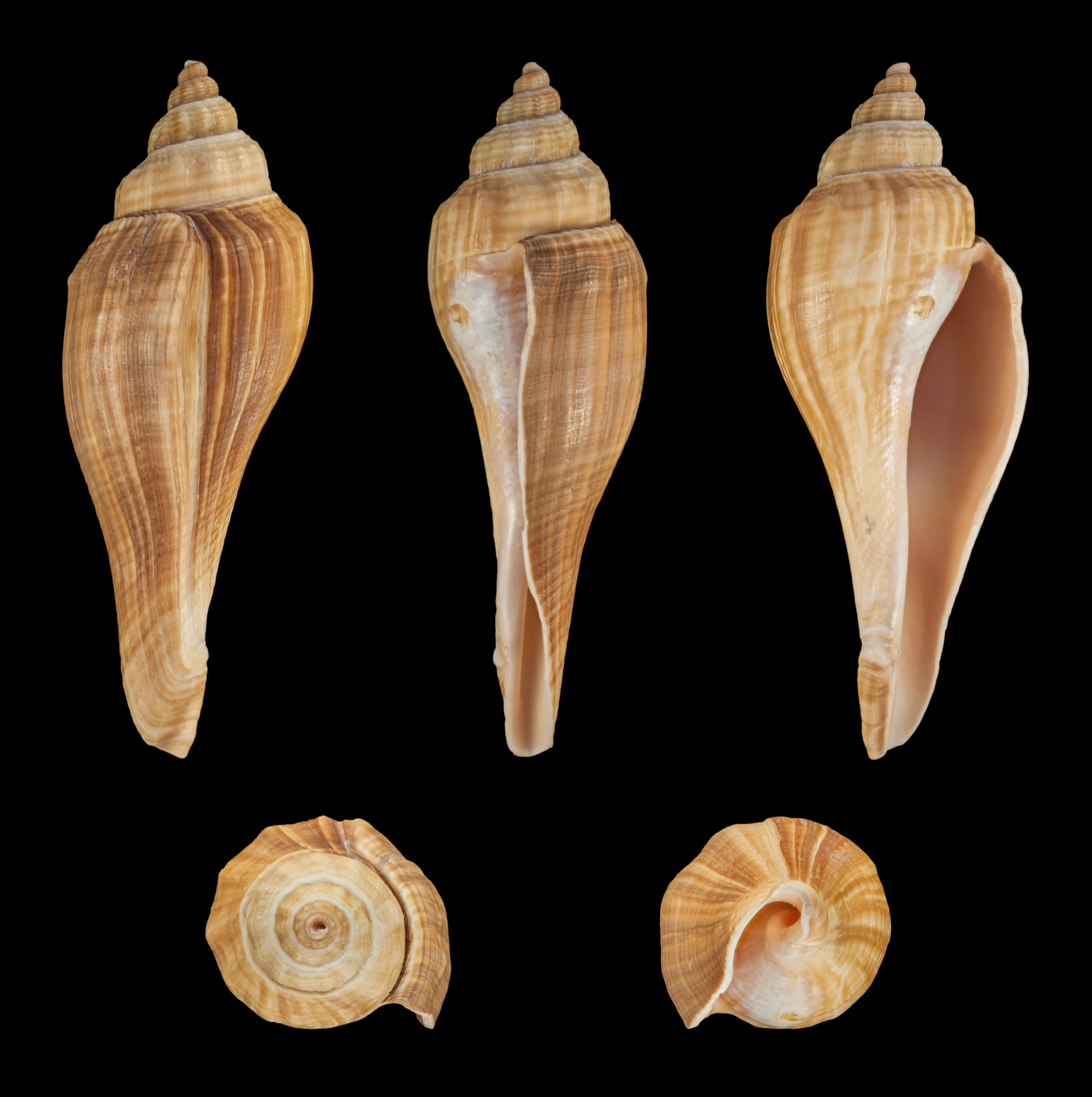
- hemifusus elongatus shells

Scientific classification
- Kingdom: Animalia
- Phylum: Mollusca
- Class: Gastropoda
- Subclass: Caenogastropoda
- Order: Neogastropoda
- Family: Melongenidae
- Genus: Lenifusus
- Species: L. elongatus

Binomial name
- Lenifusus elongatus (Lamarck, 1822)

Synonyms
- Buccinum tuba Gmelin, 1791 (secondary homonym of simultaneously published Murex tuba Gmelin, 1791); Hemifusus elongatus (Lamarck, 1822); Hemifusus zhangyii Kosuge, 2008; Pugilina elongata (Lamarck, 1822); Pyrula elongata Lamarck, 1822 (original combination)

= Lenifusus elongatus =

Species of gastropod

Lenifusus elongatus is a synonym of Brunneifusus ternatanus, a marine gastropod mollusk in the family Melongenidae.

== Distribution ==
Vietnam.
