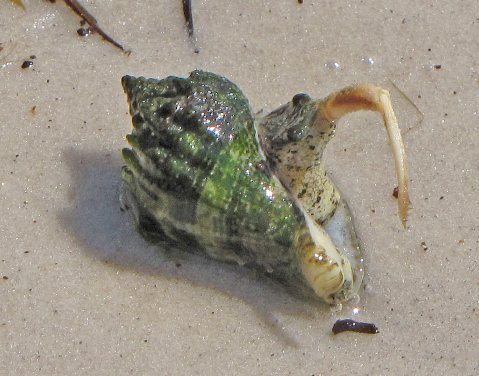
- A live individual of Melongena corona righting itself by using its operculum

Scientific classification
- Kingdom: Animalia
- Phylum: Mollusca
- Class: Gastropoda
- Subclass: Caenogastropoda
- Order: Neogastropoda
- Superfamily: Buccinoidea
- Family: Melongenidae
- Genus: Melongena; Schumacher, 1817

Type species
- Melongena fasciata Schumacher, 1817

Synonyms
- Galeodes Röding, 1798 (non Olivi, 1791)

= Melongena =

Melongena Temporal range: Late Miocene-Recent

Genus of gastropods

Melongena is a genus of sea snails, marine gastropod mollusks in the family Melongenidae, the crown conches and their allies.

== Species ==
Species within the genus Melongena include:

- † Melongena basilica (Bellardi, 1873)
- Melongena bispinosa (Philippi, 1844)
- † Melongena californica Anderson & Martin, 1914
- Melongena corona (Gmelin, 1791) - crown conch - synonym: Melongena subcoronata
- † Melongena lainei (Basterot, 1825)
- Melongena melongena (Linnaeus, 1758) - type species
- † Melongena murifactor Vermeij & Raven, 2009
- Melongena patula (Linnaeus, 1758)
- † Melongena pontonxensis Lozouet, 2021
- † Melongena woodwardi (Roxo, 1924) - from Miocene of the Pebas Formation

Synonyms

- Melongena belknapi Petit de la Saussaye, 1852: synonym of Melongena corona (Gmelin, 1791)
- Melongena bicolor (Say, 1826): synonym of Melongena corona (Gmelin, 1791)
- Melongena fasciata Schumacher, 1817: synonym of Melongena melongena (Linnaeus, 1758)
- Melongena paradisiaca (Röding, 1798): synonym of Volema paradisiaca Röding, 1798 : synonym of Volema pyrum (Gmelin, 1791) (previous combination)
- Melongena perspinosa Pilsbry & Vanatta, 1934 accepted as Melongena corona (Gmelin, 1791)
- Melongena pirum Dautzenberg, 1929: synonym of Volema pyrum (Gmelin, 1791)
- Melongena sprucecreekensis Tucker, 1994: synonym of Melongena corona (Gmelin, 1791)
- † Melongena vigneauxi Magne & Vergneau-Saubade, 1970: synonym of † Melongena basilica (Bellardi, 1873)

The shells of Melongena species are extremely variable in shape and sculpture, and historically this has meant that a large number of different forms have been named, creating numerous synonyms.

There is still some disagreement about how many modern species of Melongena actually exist. However, phylogenetic analysis indicate that there are only three species in the Western Atlantic, with all snails in coastal Florida being referred to Melongena corona.

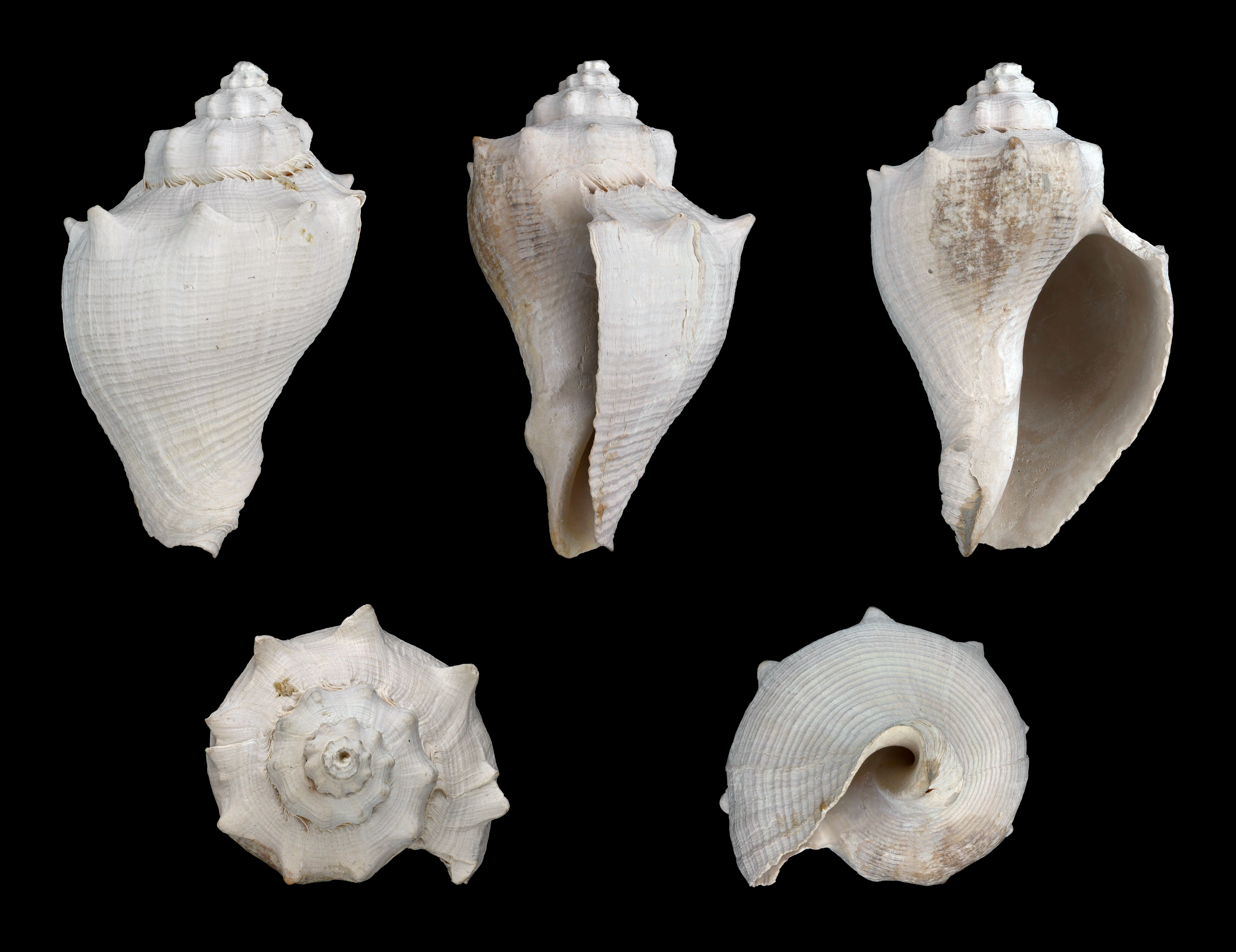
Melongena caloosahatcheensis

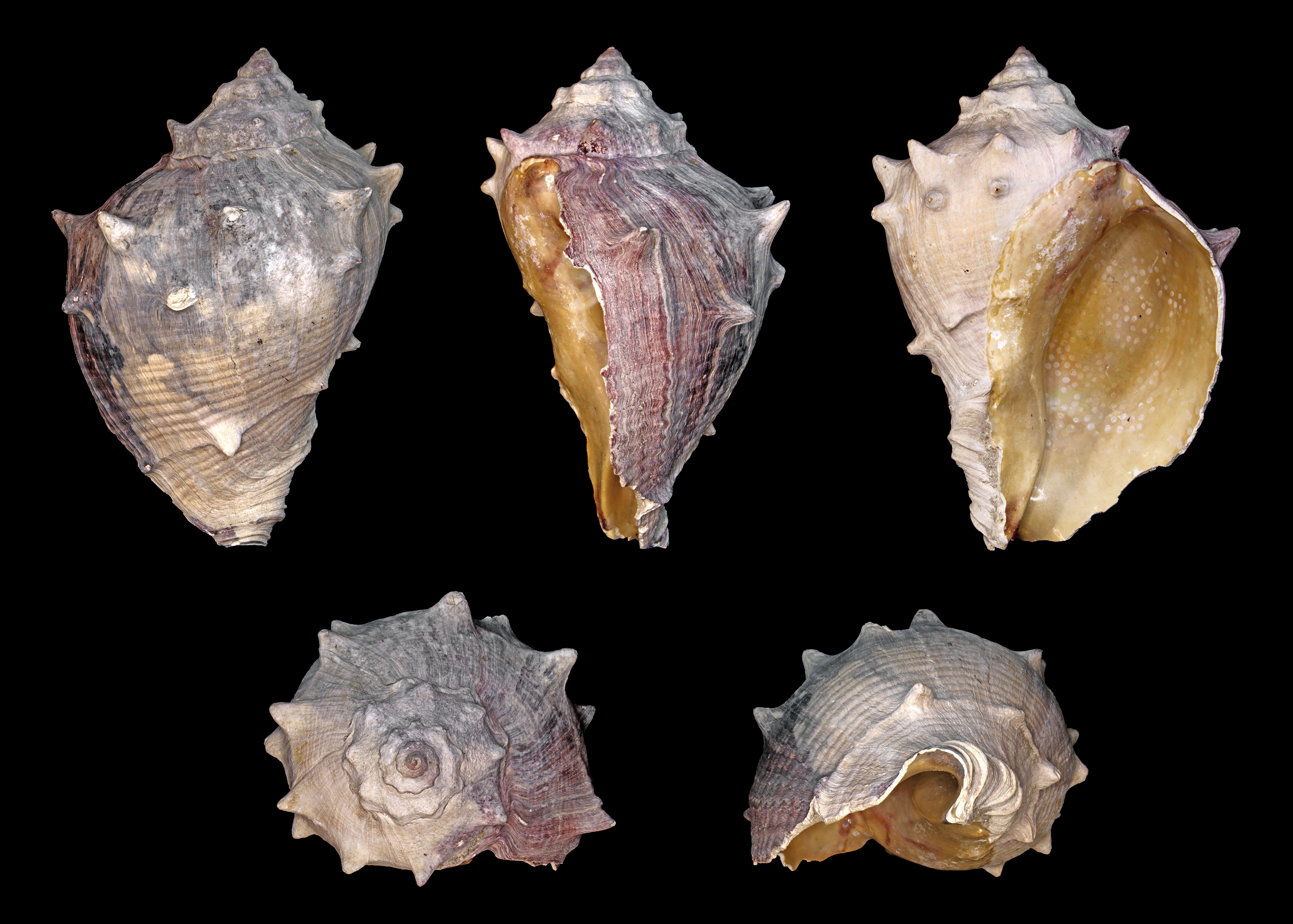
Melongena consors

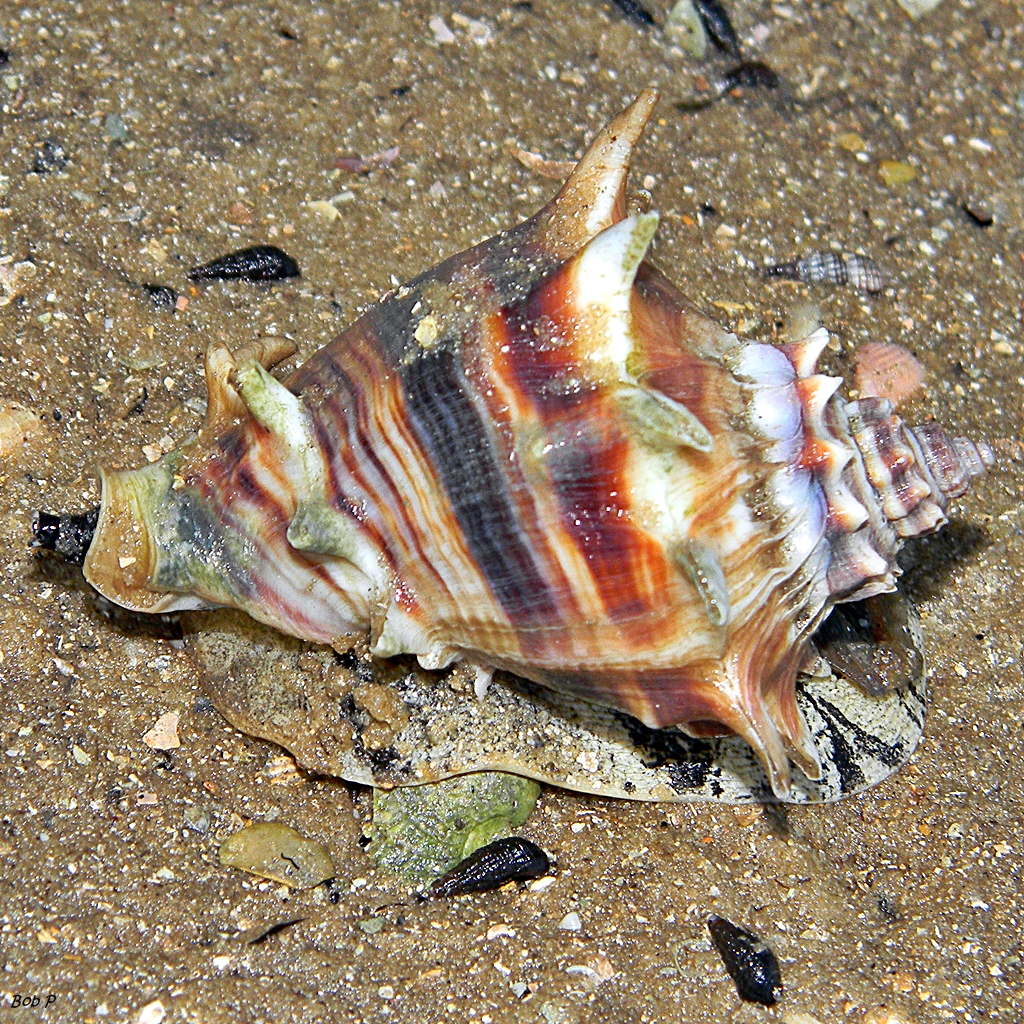
Melongena corona

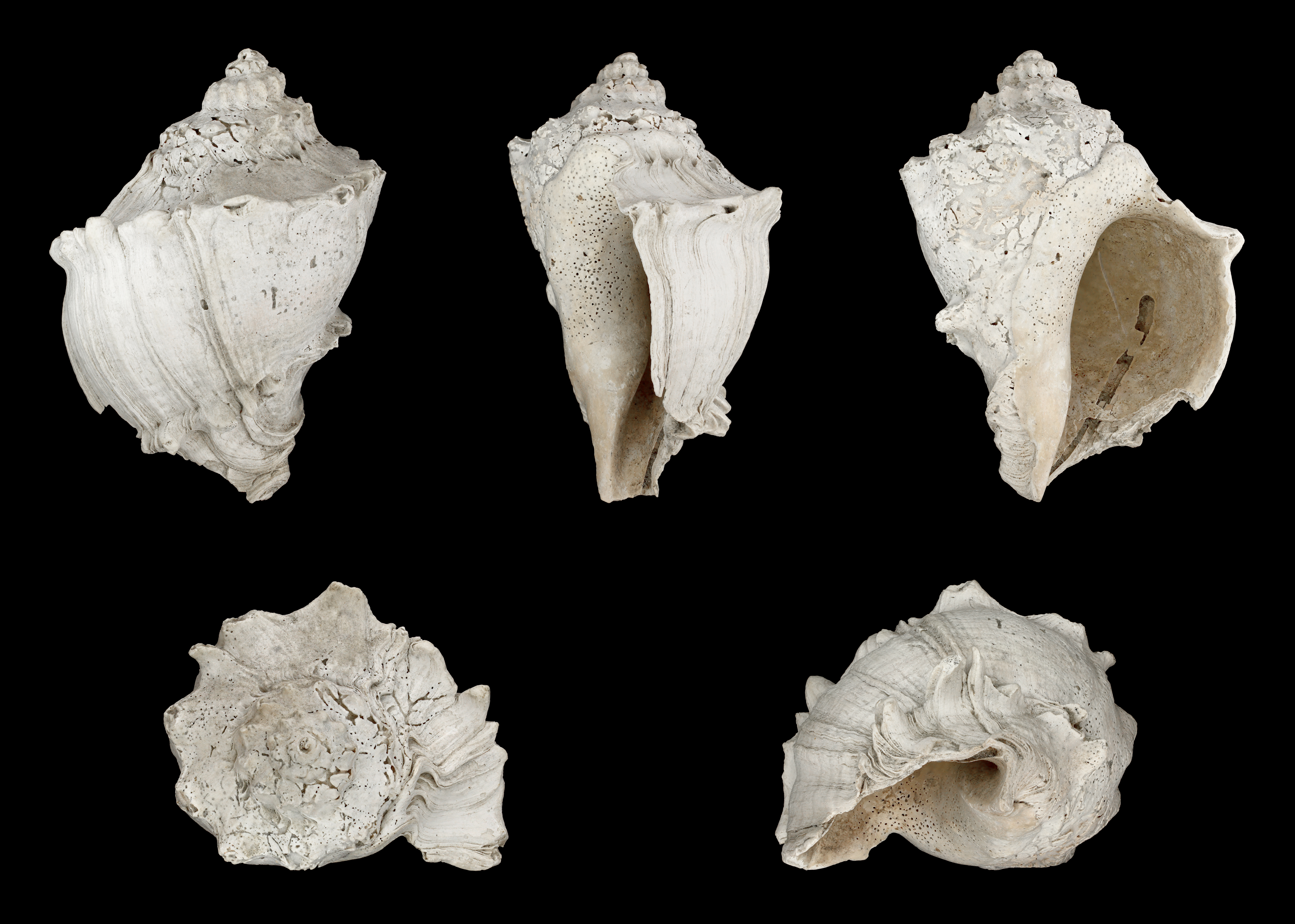
Melongena corona
Fossil

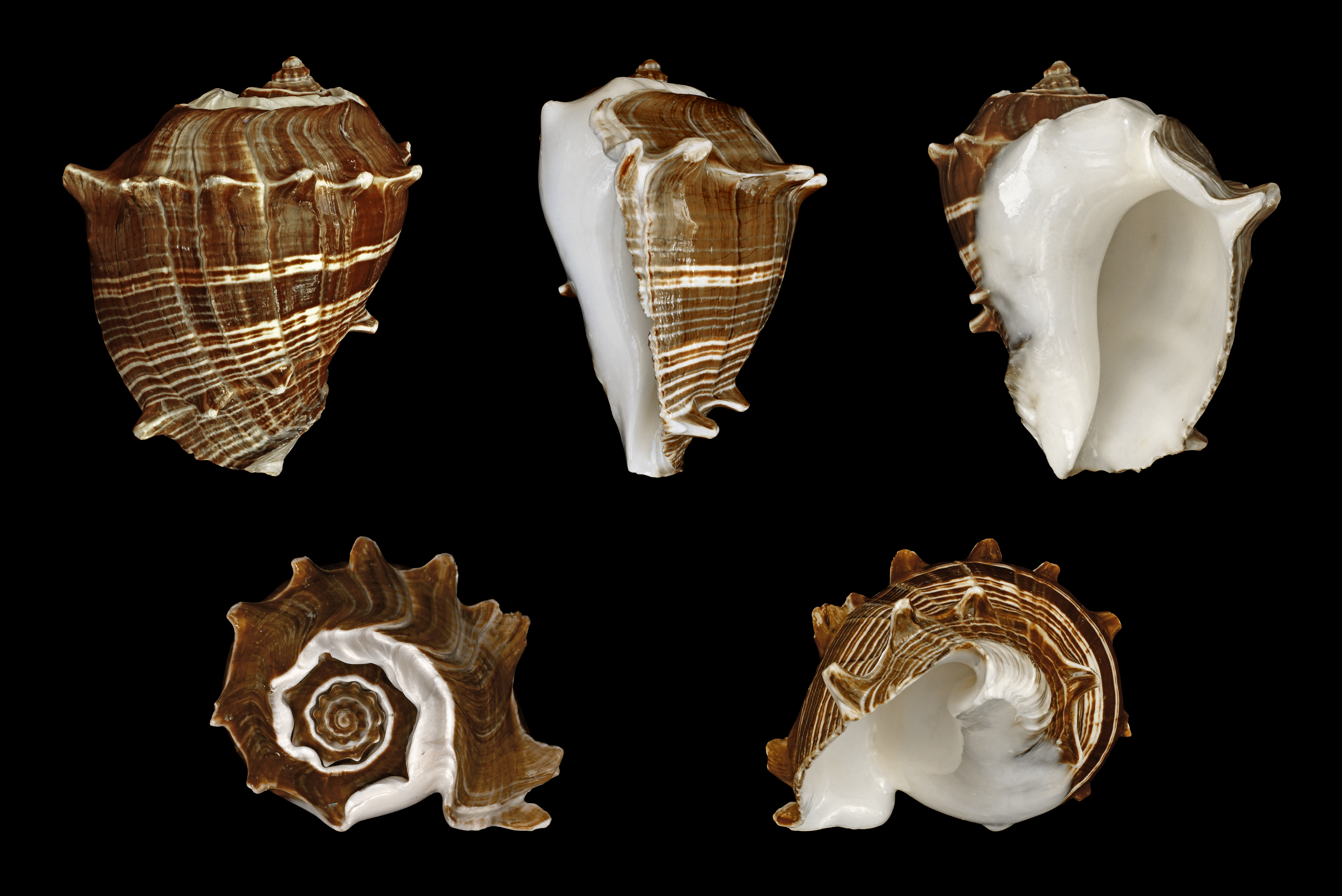
Melongena melongena

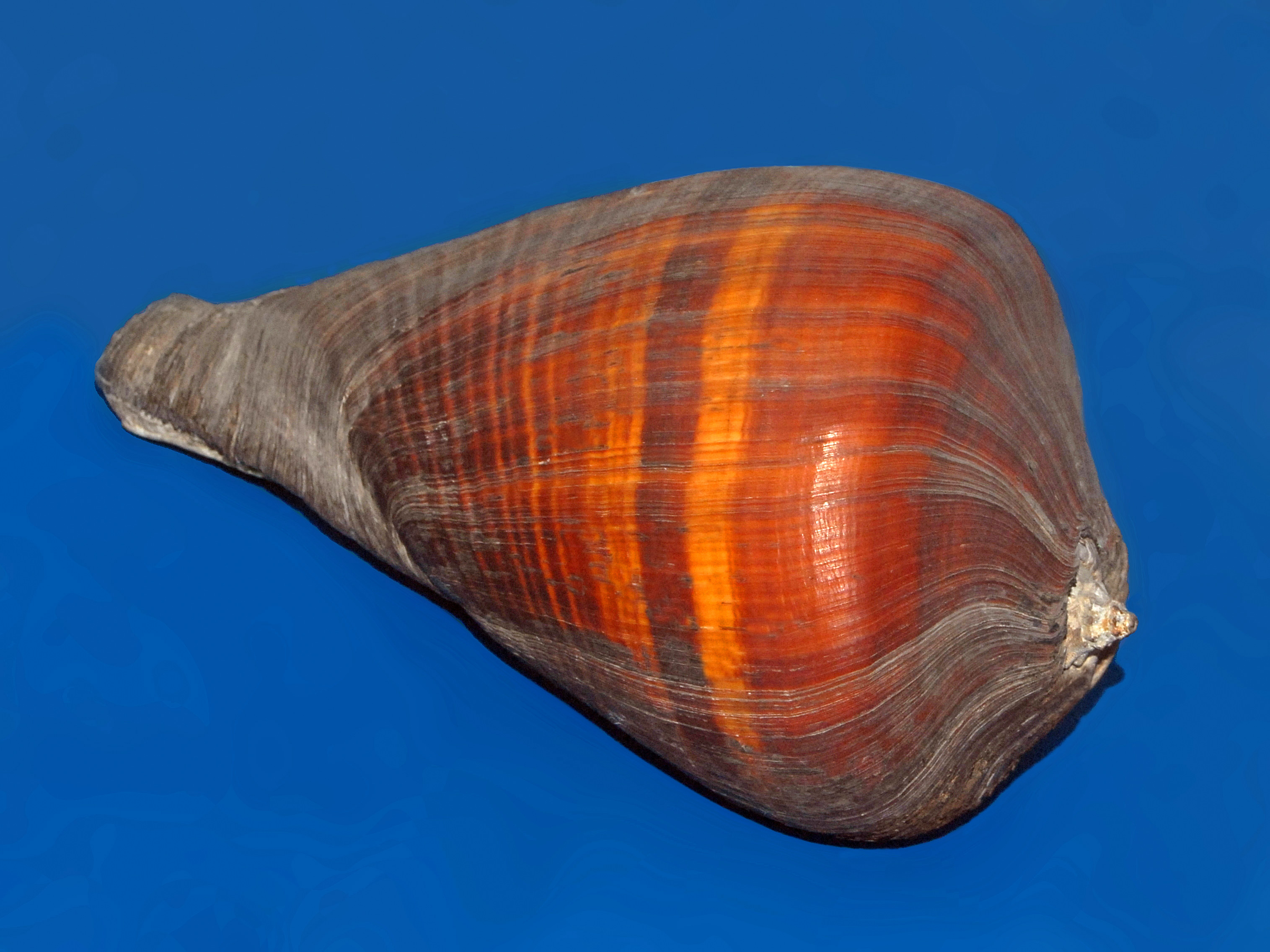
Melongena patula

Melongena sarasotaensis

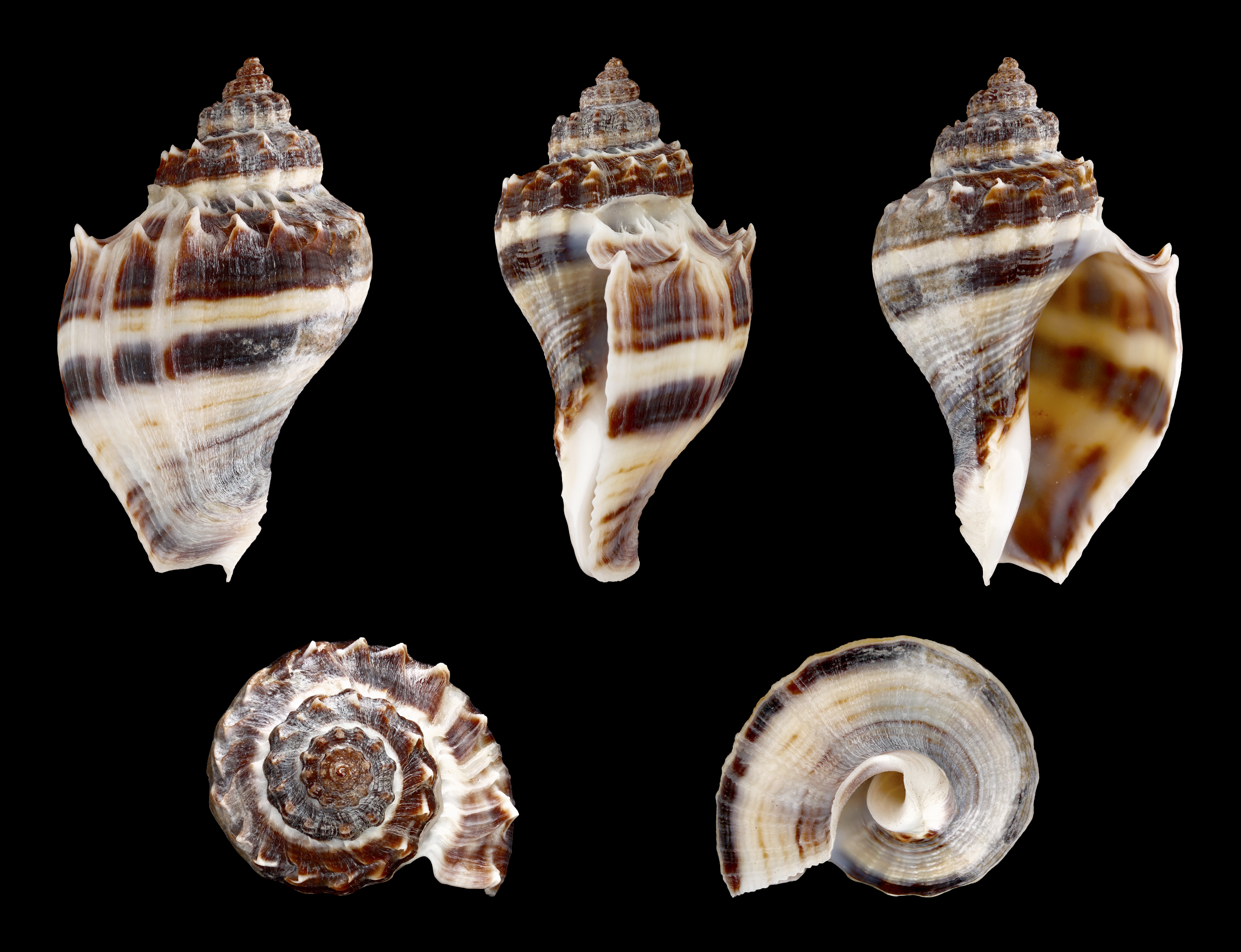
Melongena sprucecreekensis

== Distribution ==
The genus Melongena occurs only in the tropical Americas. It appears that three nominally valid species occur in the tropics of the western Atlantic: one in Florida, one in the Yucatan, and one in Central America and the Caribbean. A fourth species is found on the tropical eastern Pacific coast.

== Habitat ==
Species within this genus live in the tropical intertidal zone, in muddy areas such as under mangrove trees.

== Life habits ==
Melongena snails are carnivorous, primarily preying on small bivalves (clams, mussels and oysters). They will also feed on other species of snails and have been known to be cannibalistic.
