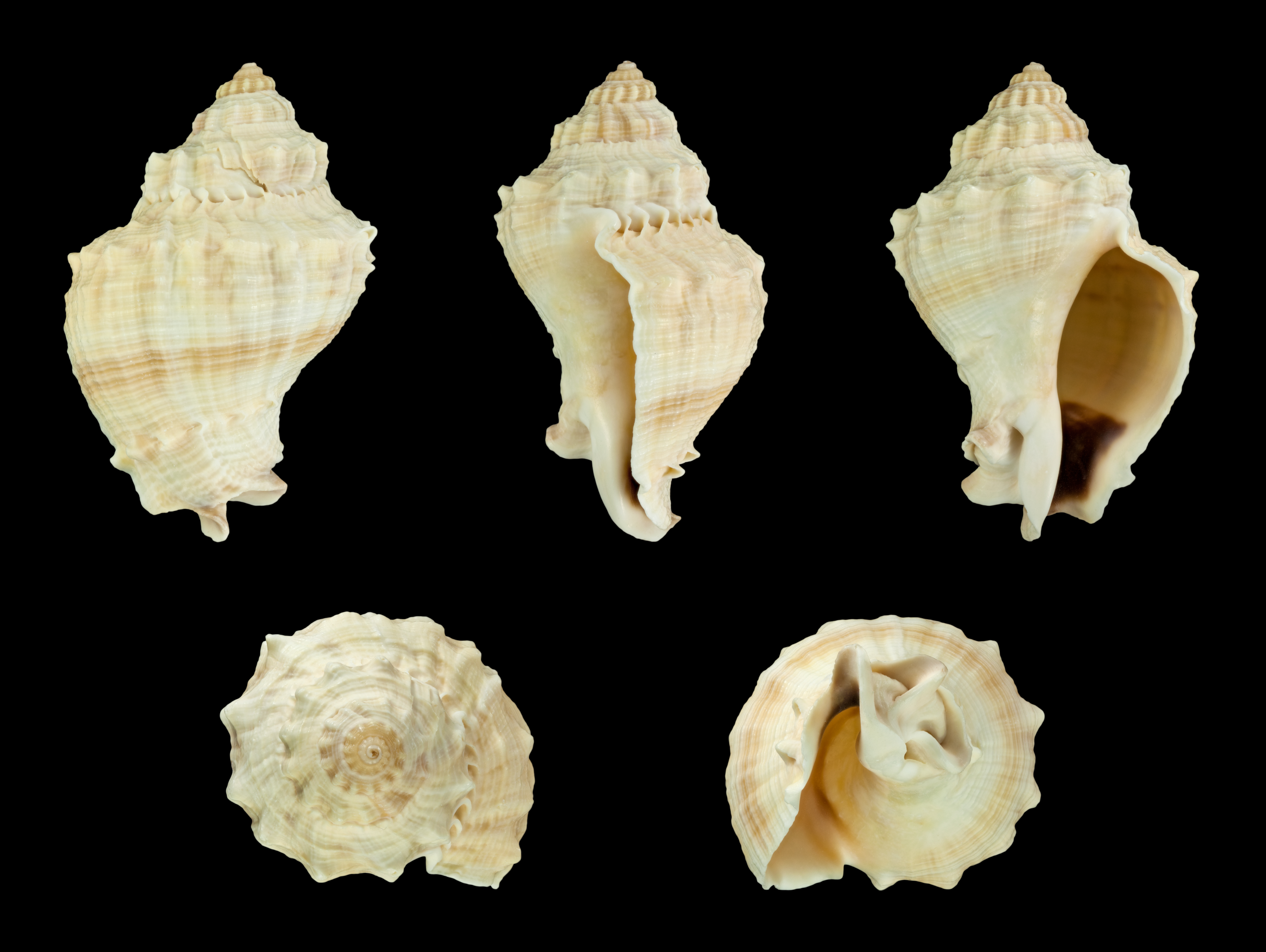

Scientific classification
- Kingdom: Animalia
- Phylum: Mollusca
- Class: Gastropoda
- Subclass: Caenogastropoda
- Order: Neogastropoda
- Family: Melongenidae
- Genus: Melongena
- Species: M. bispinosa

Binomial name
- Melongena bispinosa (Philippi, 1844)

= Melongena bispinosa =

Species of gastropod

Melongena bispinosa is a species of sea snail that belongs to the family Melongenidae.

The species was described in 1844 by Rodolfo Amando Philippi, a German–Chilean malcologist, paleontologist and zoologist.
