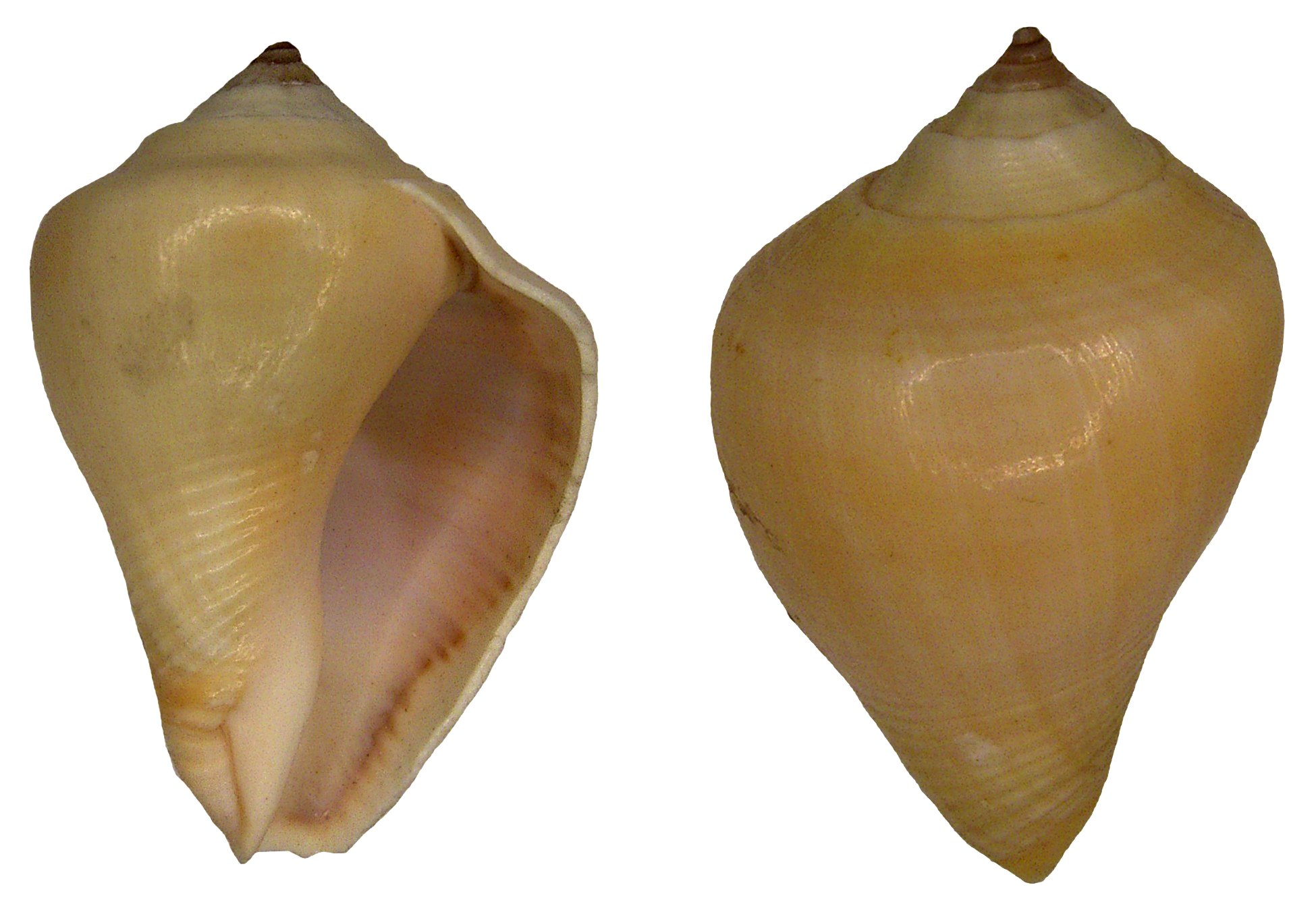
- Volema pyrum

Scientific classification
- Kingdom: Animalia
- Phylum: Mollusca
- Class: Gastropoda
- Subclass: Caenogastropoda
- Order: Neogastropoda
- Superfamily: Buccinoidea
- Family: Melongenidae
- Genus: Volema; Röding, 1798

Type species
- Volema paradisiaca Röding, 1798

Synonyms
- Melongena (Myristica) Swainson, 1840; Melongena (Volema) Röding, 1798; Myristica Swainson, 1840; Purpura (Thalessa) H. Adams & A. Adams, 1853; Pyrula (Myristica) Swainson, 1840; Thais (Thalessa) H. Adams & A. Adams, 1853; Thalessa H. Adams & A. Adams, 1853

= Volema =

Genus of gastropods

Volema is a genus of sea snails, marine gastropod molluscs in the family Melongenidae, the crown conches and their allies.

== Description ==
(Described as Thalessa) The spire is elevated. The whorls are spinose and angulated at the upper part. The aperture is moderate. The columella is rounded and tubercular in front. The outer lip is nodulous internally.

== Species ==
Species within the genus Volema include:

- Volema myristica Röding, 1798
- Volema nodosa (Lamarck, 1822)
- Volema pyrum (Gmelin, 1791)

Species brought into synonymy

- Volema alouina Röding, 1798: synonym of Thais (Mancinella) alouina (Röding, 1798)
- Volema aromatica Röding, 1798 accepted as Volema myristica Röding, 1798
- Volema cotonea Röding, 1798 accepted as Volema pyrum (Gmelin, 1791)
- Volema curtangniona Röding, 1798 accepted as Turbinella pyrum (Linnaeus, 1767)
- Volema glacialis Röding, 1798: synonym of Thais (Mancinella) alouina (Röding, 1798)
- Volema moschatellina Röding, 1798 accepted as Thais hippocastanum (Linnaeus, 1758) accepted as Volema myristica Röding, 1798
- Volema nuxmoschata Röding, 1798 accepted as Volema pyrum (Gmelin, 1791)
- Volema paradisiaca Röding, 1798: synonym of Volema pyrum (Gmelin, 1791)
- Volema pheata Röding, 1798 : synonym of Rapana bezoar (Linnaeus, 1767)
- Volema plicata Röding, 1798 accepted as Rapana bezoar (Linnaeus, 1767)
- Volema pyrum Röding, 1798 accepted as Volema pyrum (Gmelin, 1791) (homonym and synonym)
