= Volegalea alforum =

Scientific classification
- Kingdom: Animalia
- Phylum: Mollusca
- Class: Gastropoda
- Subclass: Caenogastropoda
- Order: Neogastropoda
- Superfamily: Buccinoidea
- Family: Melongenidae
- Genus: Volegalea
- Species: V. alforum

Binomial name
- Volegalea alforum Thach, 2021

Species of gastropod

Volegalea alforum is a species of sea snail, a marine gastropod mollusk in the family Melongenidae, the crown conches and their allies.

== Distribution ==
This marine species occurs in the South China Sea off Vietnam.
