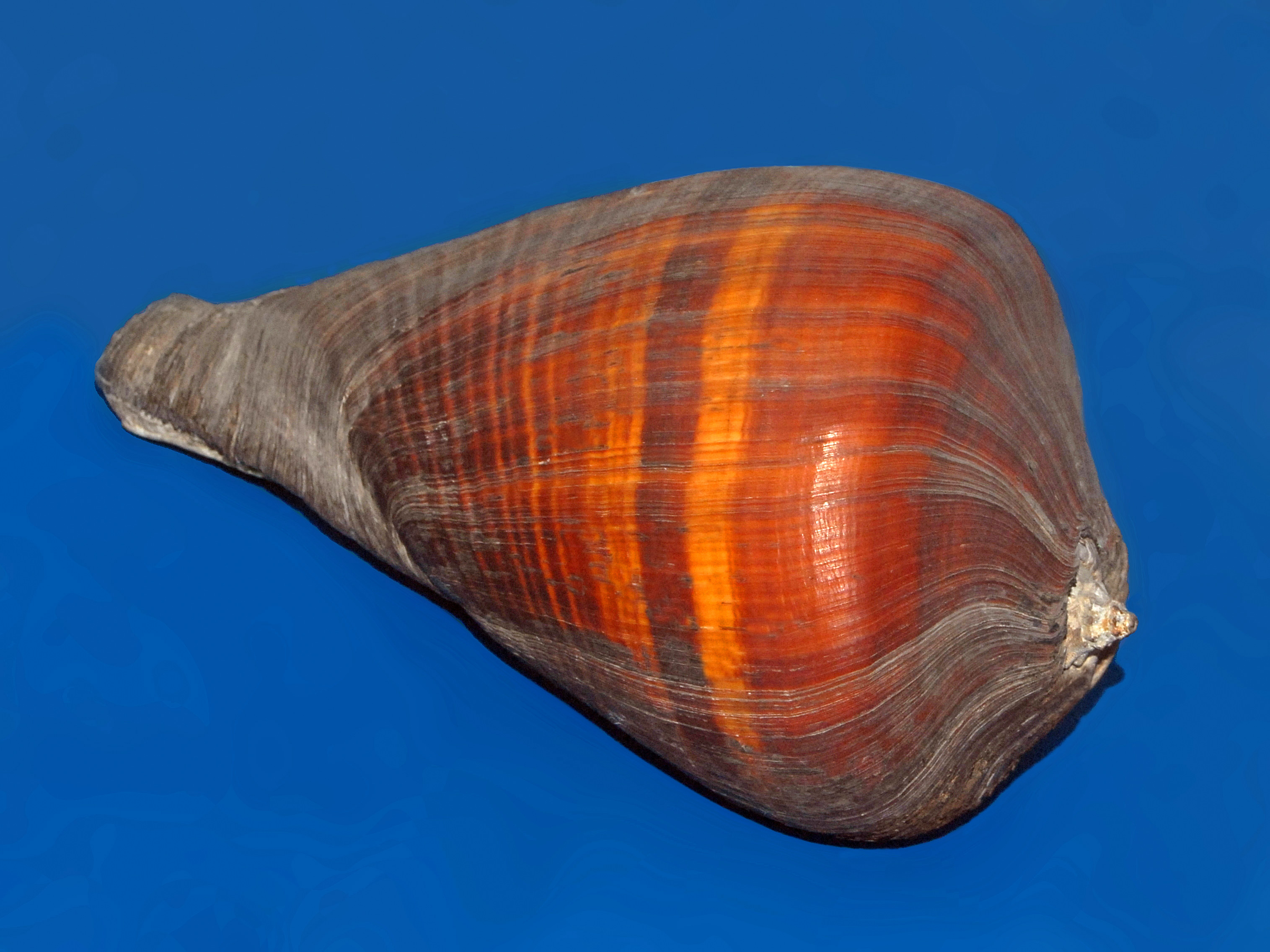
- Shell of Melongena patula from Nicaragua at the Museo Civico di Storia Naturale di Milano

Scientific classification
- Kingdom: Animalia
- Phylum: Mollusca
- Class: Gastropoda
- Subclass: Caenogastropoda
- Order: Neogastropoda
- Family: Melongenidae
- Genus: Melongena
- Species: M. patula

Binomial name
- Melongena patula (Philippi, 1844)

= Melongena patula =

Species of gastropod

Melongena patula, common name Pacific crown conch, is a species of large sea snail, a marine gastropod mollusk in the family Melongenidae.

== Description ==
Melongena patula has a shell that reaches a length of 75 – 250 mm. The surface of this shell shows a deep chestnut brown color lined with a few white or yellow spiral bands. The interior is white. The shell is quite slender, sometimes spiny on the shoulders, with a wide aperture.

== Distribution ==
This species can be found from the Gulf of California (Mexico) to Peru.

== Habitat ==
These sea snails live in shallow water, usually in sandy or muddy areas, especially under mangrove trees.
