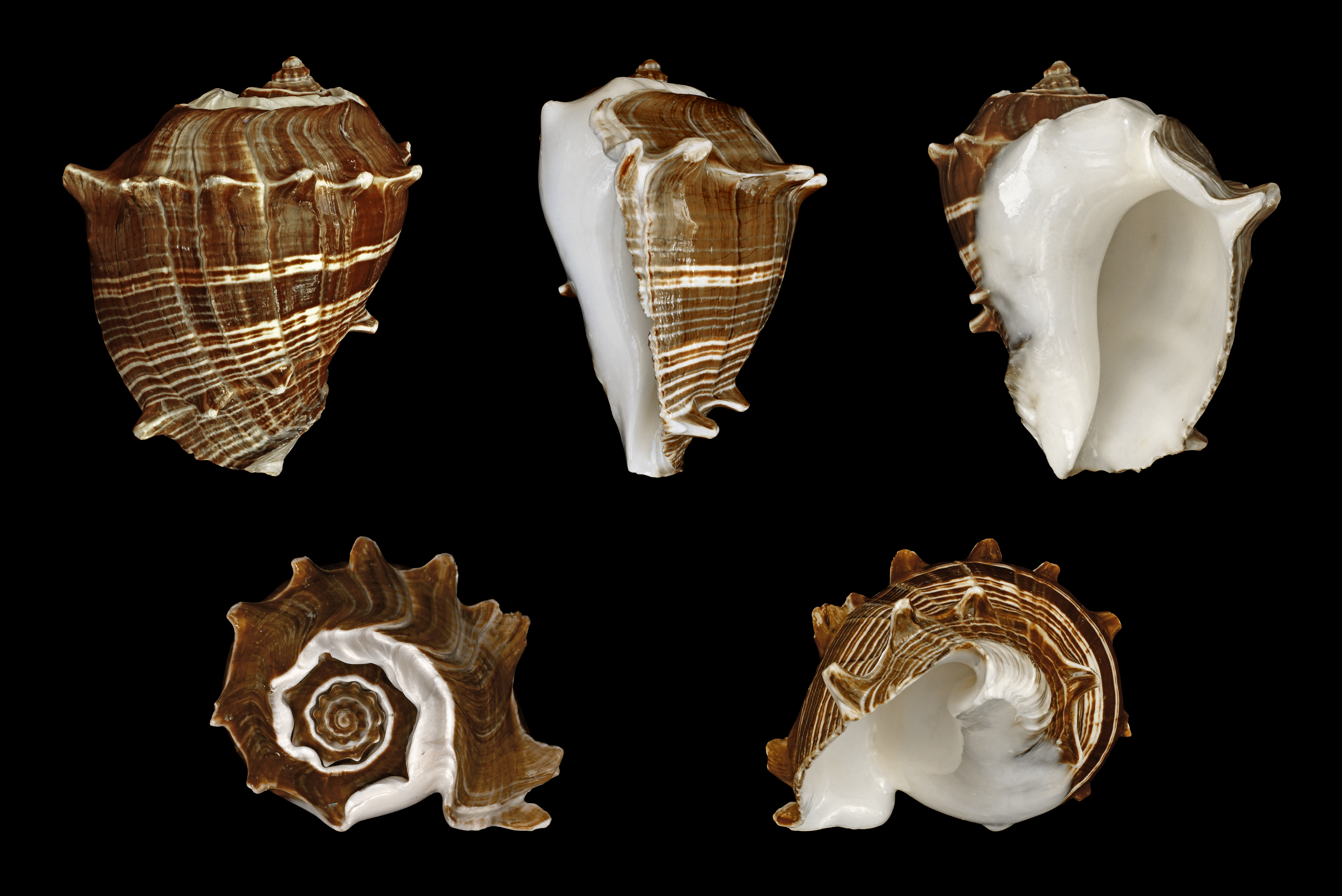
- Five views of a shell of Melongena melongena (Linné, 1758)

Scientific classification
- Kingdom: Animalia
- Phylum: Mollusca
- Class: Gastropoda
- Subclass: Caenogastropoda
- Order: Neogastropoda
- Family: Melongenidae
- Genus: Melongena
- Species: M. melongena

Binomial name
- Melongena melongena (Linnaeus, 1758)

= Melongena melongena =

Species of gastropod

Melongena melongena, common name the Caribbean crown conch, is a species of large sea snail, a marine gastropod mollusk in the family Melongenidae, the crown conches. Other common names: West Indian Crown Conch, Brown Crown Conch, Black Crown Conch, Fiber Conch.
