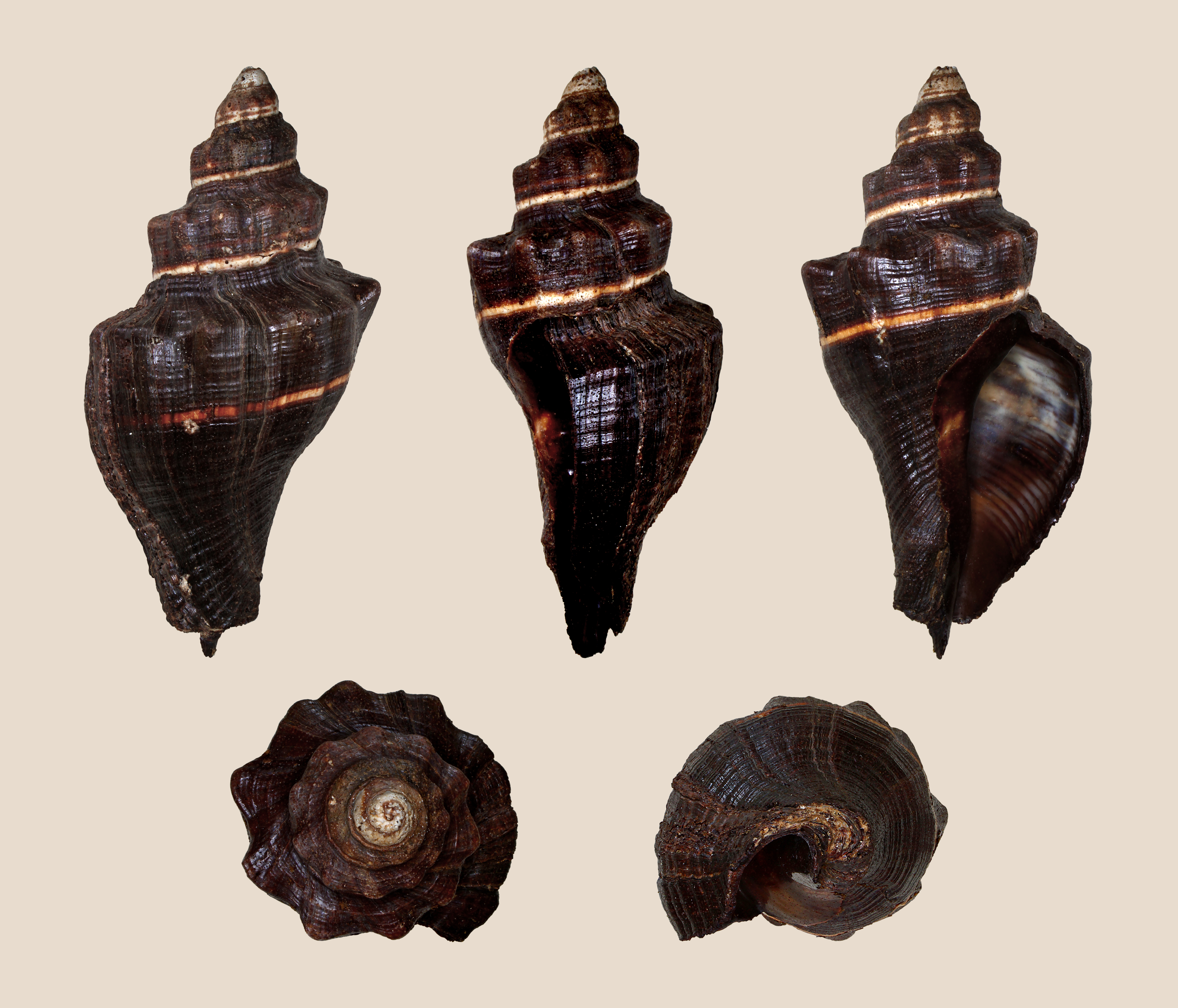
- Pugilina morio

Scientific classification
- Kingdom: Animalia
- Phylum: Mollusca
- Class: Gastropoda
- Subclass: Caenogastropoda
- Order: Neogastropoda
- Family: Melongenidae
- Genus: Pugilina
- Species: P. morio

Binomial name
- Pugilina morio (Linnaeus, 1758)

Synonyms
- Semifusus morio Linnaeus; Fusus brevis Müller, O.F., 1766; Murex bandarius Perry, G., 1811; Murex bandatus Perry, G., 1811; Fusus coronatus Lamarck, J.B.P.A. de, 1816; Pugilina fasciata Schumacher, H.C.F., 1817

= Pugilina morio =

Species of sea snail

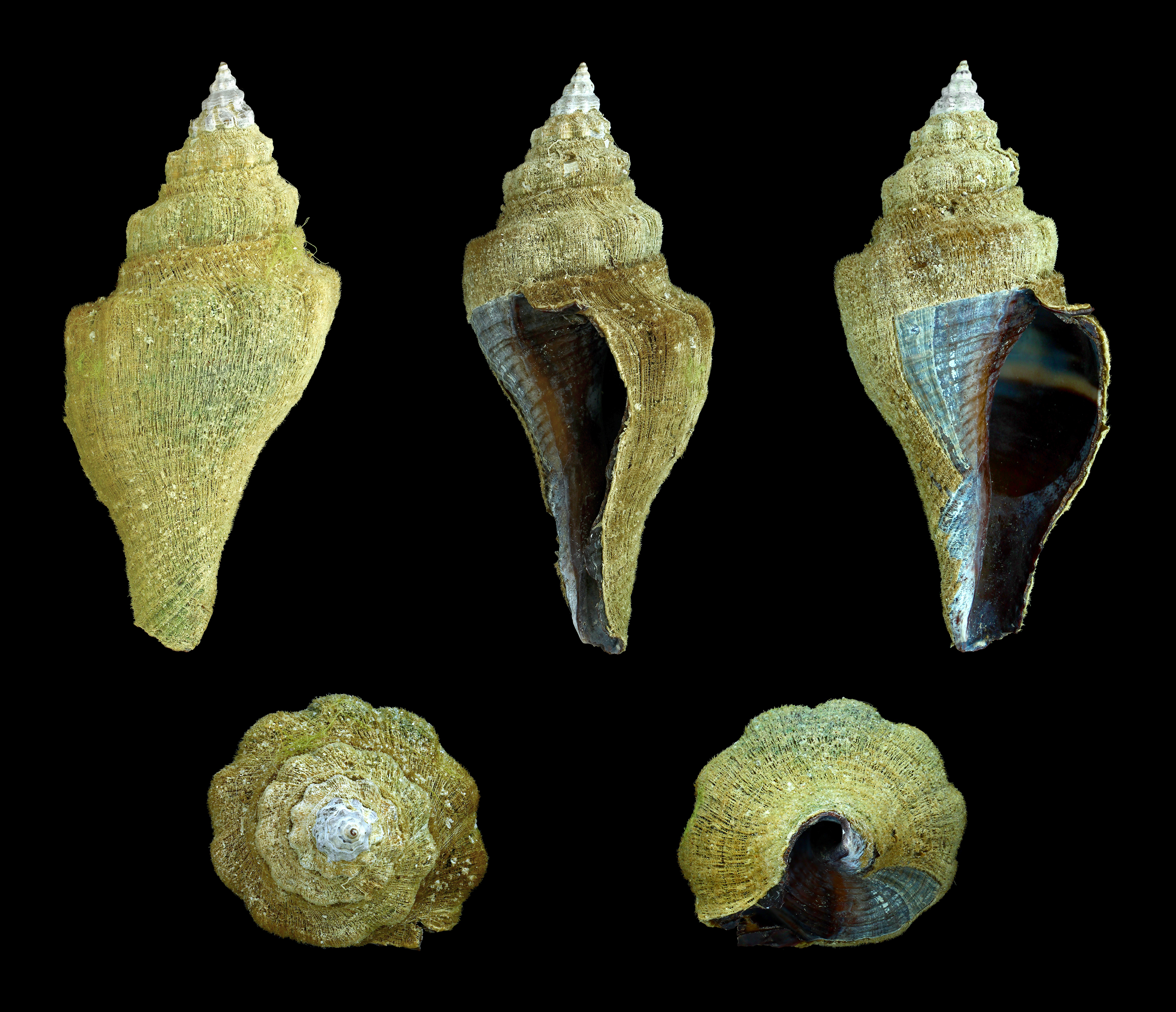
Shell with periostracum

Pugilina morio, common name the giant hairy melongena, is a species of sea snail, a marine gastropod mollusk in the family Melongenidae, the crown conches and their allies.

== Description ==
The adult shell typically measures between 75 and 270 mm (3.0 and 10.6 in) in length. The shell is fusiform, heavy, and solid, with approximately 9 to 10 convex whorls. Its coloration ranges from dark brown to reddish brown, commonly featuring a pale, narrow yellowish spiral band across the body whorl.

The teleoconch surface bears fine spiral cords and blunt nodules along the shoulder. In living specimens, the shell surface is covered by a thick, velvety brown periostracum with short hair-like projections, which gives the species its common name. The aperture is elongated, terminating in a wide siphonal canal, with an oval, horny operculum.

== Distribution and habitat ==
In a strict taxonomic sense, Pugilina morio is restricted to the tropical eastern Atlantic Ocean along the West African coast, including Mauritania, Senegal, Cape Verde, Gabon, and Angola. Populations in the western Atlantic and Brazil formerly treated as P. morio were recognized in 2015 as a separate species, Pugilina tupiniquim.

The snail inhabits shallow coastal waters, intertidal mudflats, and estuarine environments, particularly in and around mangrove root systems near river mouths.

== Ecology ==
Like other melongenids, Pugilina morio is an active predator and scavenger on muddy substrates. It feeds mainly on bivalves, other gastropods, and carrion.
