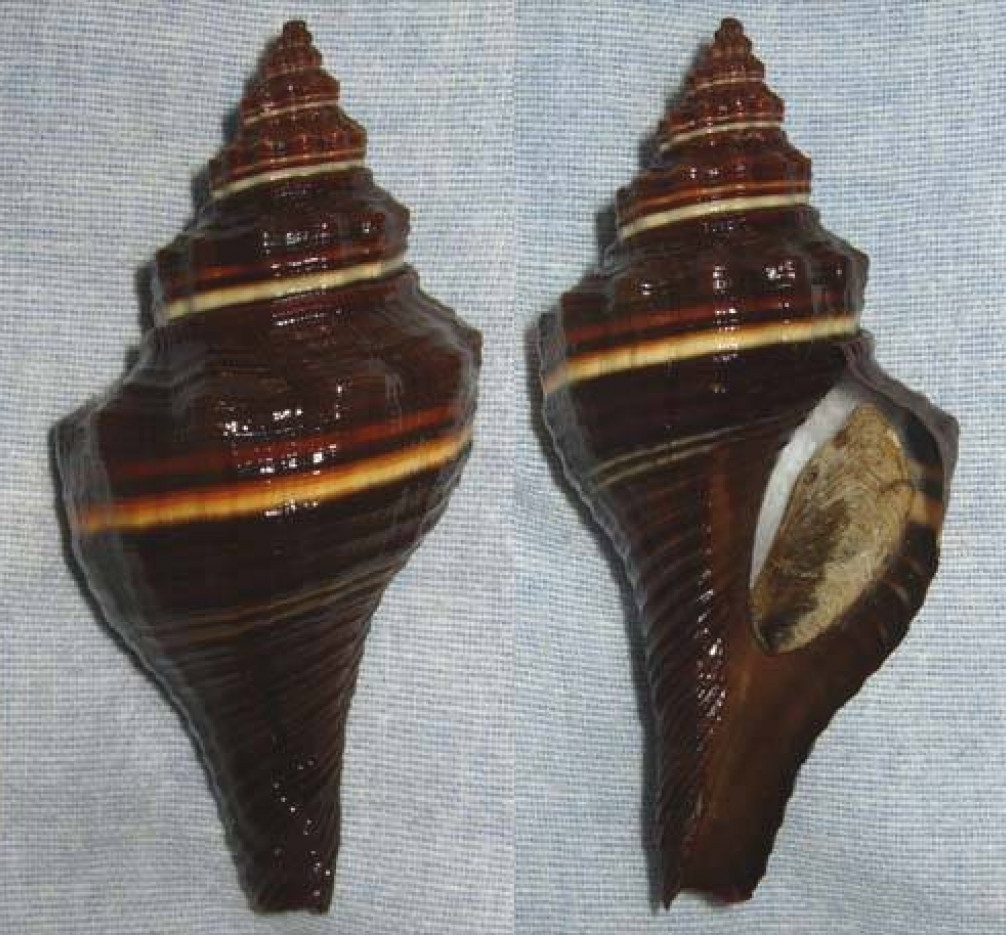
- A shell of Pugilina tupiniquim from Rio Grande do Norte, Brazil

Scientific classification
- Kingdom: Animalia
- Phylum: Mollusca
- Class: Gastropoda
- Subclass: Caenogastropoda
- Order: Neogastropoda
- Family: Melongenidae
- Genus: Pugilina
- Species: P. tupiniquim

Binomial name
- Pugilina tupiniquim Abbate & Simone, 2015

= Pugilina tupiniquim =

Species of gastropod

Pugilina tupiniquim is a species of sea snails, a marine gastropod mollusk in the family Melongenidae, the crown conches and their allies. This species and its Eastern Atlantic congener, Pugilina morio, were once thought to be a single, amphiatlantic entity. They have, however, been recognized as distinct taxa based on anatomical and environmental differences.

== Distribution ==
This species is found in the Western Atlantic Ocean, in mangrove areas along the Brazilian coast, and north to the Caribbean.

== Human use ==
In traditional Brazilian medicine in the Northeast of Brazil, Pugilina tupiniquim (formerly referred to as Pugilina morio, an Eastern Atlantic sister species) is used as zootherapeutical product for the treatment of sexual impotence.
