= Volegalea carnaria =

Scientific classification
- Kingdom: Animalia
- Phylum: Mollusca
- Class: Gastropoda
- Subclass: Caenogastropoda
- Order: Neogastropoda
- Superfamily: Buccinoidea
- Family: Melongenidae
- Genus: Volegalea
- Species: V. carnaria

Binomial name
- Volegalea carnaria (Röding, 1798)

Synonyms
- Fusus carinarius Röding, 1798; Semifusus carnarius (Röding, 1798); Semifusus carnarius var. laevis C. Bayer, 1952

Species of gastropod

Volegalea carnaria is a species of sea snail, a marine gastropod mollusk in the family Melongenidae, the crown conches and their allies.
