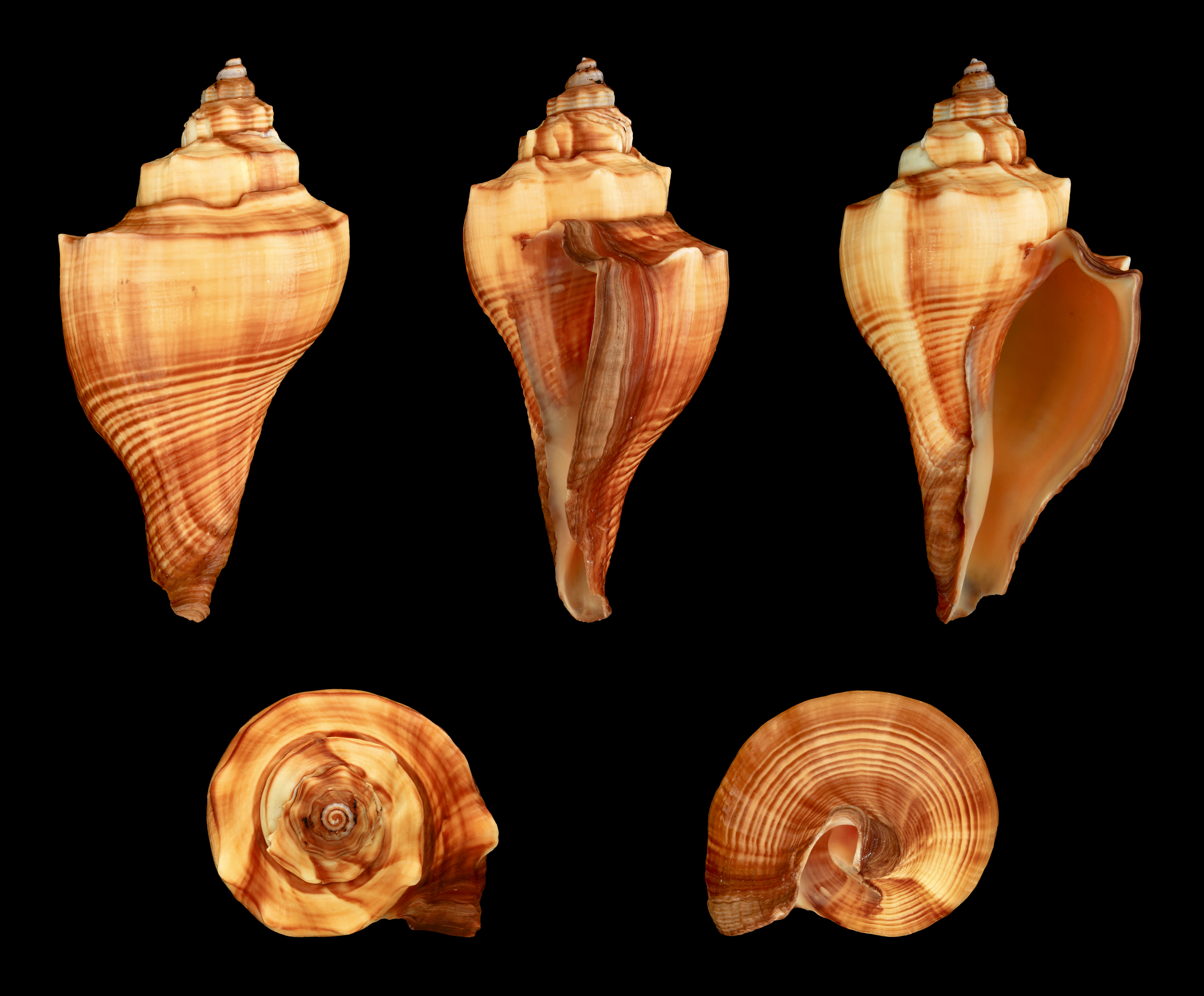
- Shell of Volegalea cochlidium

Scientific classification
- Kingdom: Animalia
- Phylum: Mollusca
- Class: Gastropoda
- Subclass: Caenogastropoda
- Order: Neogastropoda
- Superfamily: Buccinoidea
- Family: Melongenidae
- Genus: Volegalea
- Species: V. cochlidium

Binomial name
- Volegalea cochlidium (Linnaeus, 1758)

Synonyms
- Cantharus tribuloides Noodt, 1819; Hemifusus pugilinus (Born, 1778); Murex cochlidium Linnaeus, 1758 (basionym); Murex pugilinus Born, 1778; Murex vespertilio Gmelin, 1791; Pugilina cochlidium (Linnaeus, 1758); Pugilina pugilina (Born, 1778); Pyrula bucephala Lamarck, 1822; Pyrula cochlidium (Linnaeus, 1758) (previous combination); Pyrula cochlidium var. coronata Kobelt, 1874; Pyrula fulva Deshayes, 1832; Semifusus cochlidium (Linnaeus, 1758); Semifusus cochlidium diademata C. Bayer, 1952; Volegalea wardiana Iredale, 1938

= Volegalea cochlidium =

Species of gastropod

Volegalea cochlidium, common name the spiral melongena, is a species of large sea snail, a marine gastropod mollusk in the family Melongenidae, the crown conches and their allies.

== Description ==
The size of the adult shell varies between 60 mm and 150 mm.

== Distribution ==
This species occurs in the Eastern Indian Ocean and also off Southern India, in the Pacific Ocean around the Philippines, Vietnam and off Australia (Northern Territory, Queensland, Western Australia).
