= Lenifusus =

Scientific classification
- Kingdom: Animalia
- Phylum: Mollusca
- Class: Gastropoda
- Subclass: Caenogastropoda
- Order: Neogastropoda
- Superfamily: Buccinoidea
- Family: Melongenidae
- Genus: Lenifusus; Dekkers, 2018

Type species
- Pyrula elongata Lamarck, 1822

Genus of gastropods

Lenifusus is a genus of sea snails, marine gastropod molluscs in the family Melongenidae, the crown conches and their allies.

== Species ==
Species within the genus Lenifusus include:

- Lenifusus elongatus (Lamarck, 1822)
