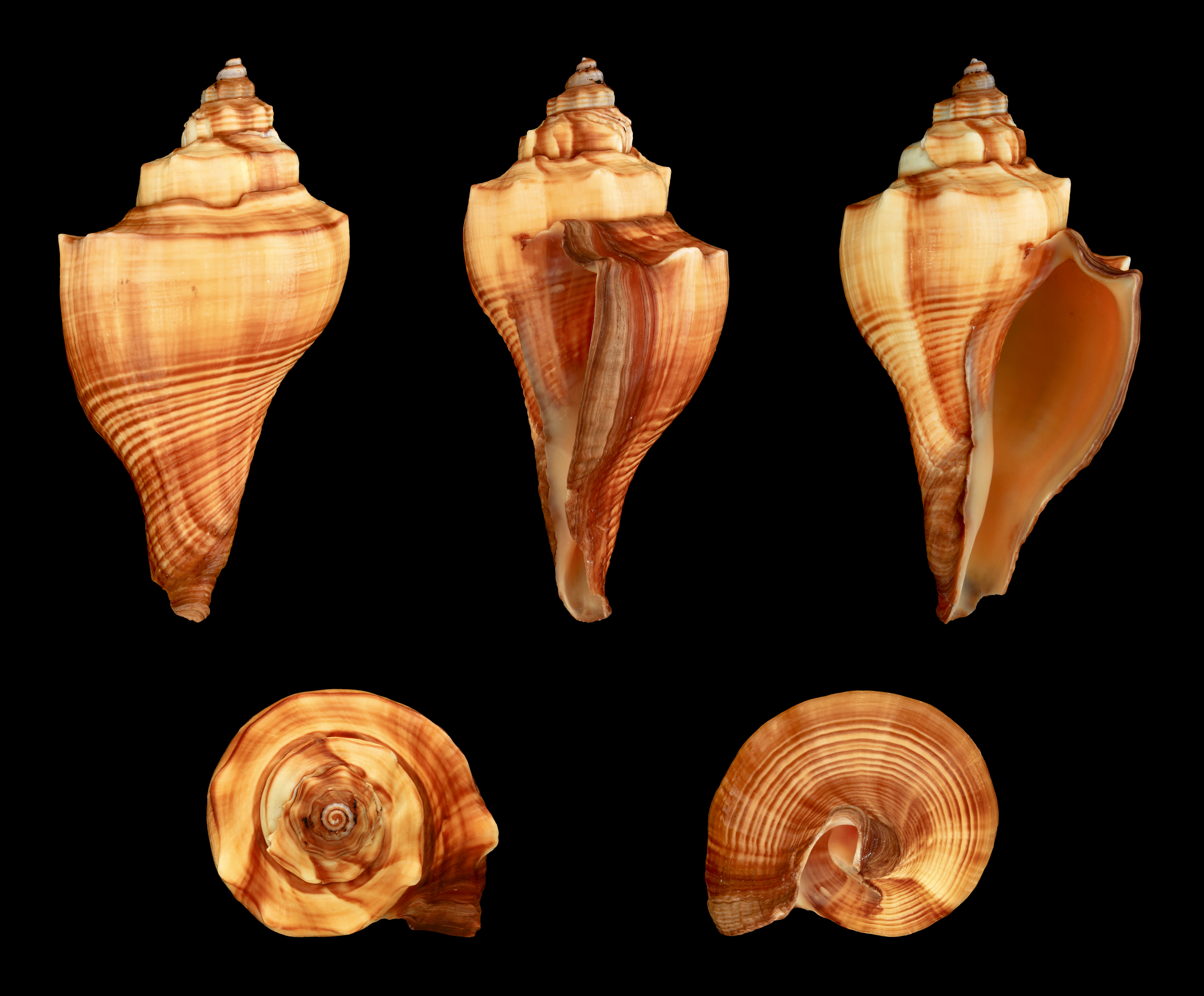
- Three views of a shell of Volegalea cochlidium

Scientific classification
- Kingdom: Animalia
- Phylum: Mollusca
- Class: Gastropoda
- Subclass: Caenogastropoda
- Order: Neogastropoda
- Superfamily: Buccinoidea
- Family: Melongenidae
- Genus: Volegalea; Iredale, 1938

Type species
- Volegalea wardiana Iredale, 1938

= Volegalea =

Genus of gastropods

Volegalea is a genus of large sea snails, marine gastropod mollusks in the family Melongenidae, the crown conches and their allies.

== Distribution ==
This marine genus is endemic to Australia and occurs off the Northern Territory, Queensland and Western Australia.

== Species ==
Species within the genus Volegalea include:

- Volegalea alforum Thach, 2021
- Volegalea carnaria (Röding, 1798)
- Volegalea cochlidium (Linnaeus, 1758)
- Volegalea dirki (Nolf, 2007)

Species brought into synonymy

- Volegalea wardiana Iredale, 1938: synonym of Volegalea cochlidium (Linnaeus, 1758)
