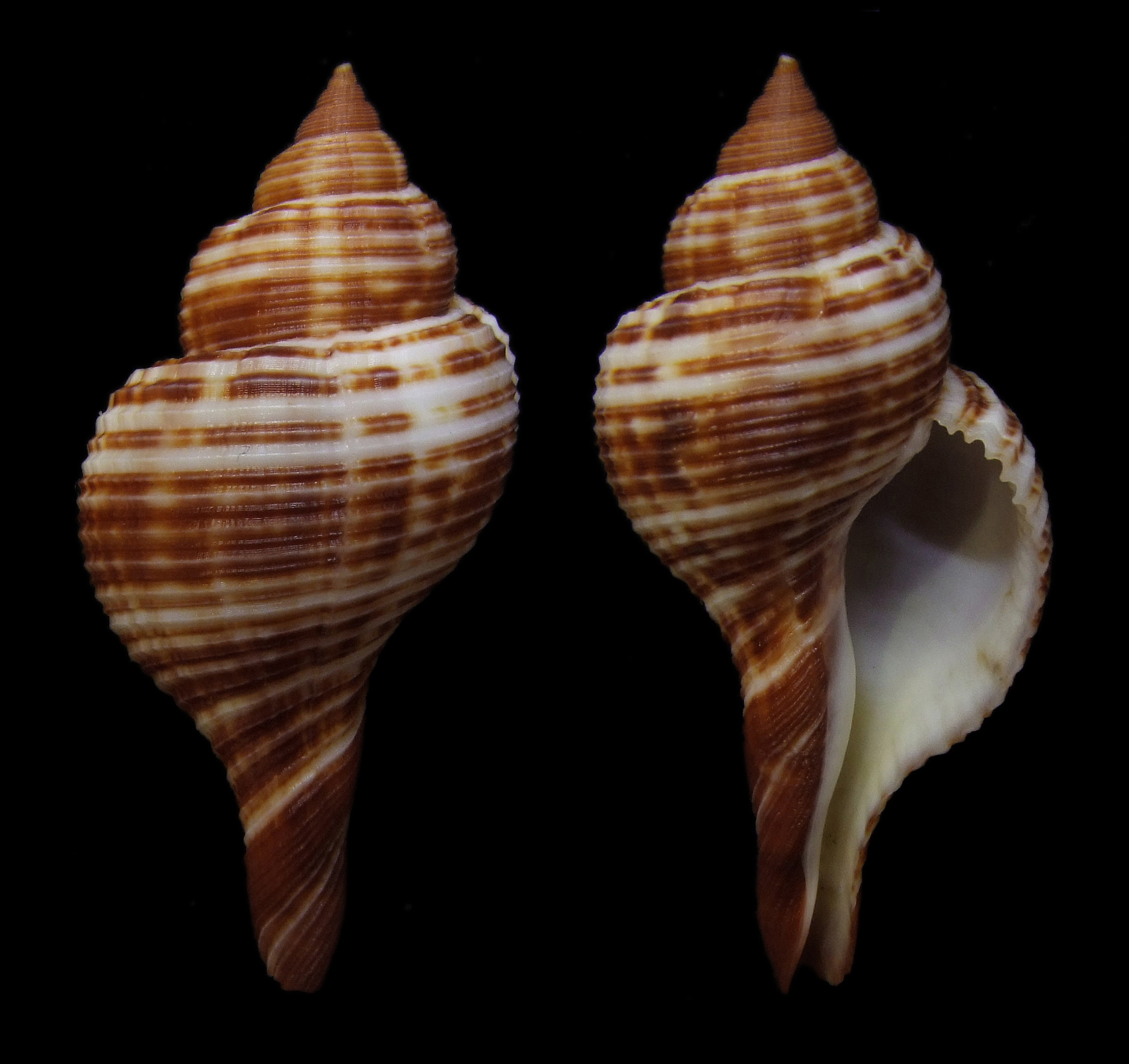
- Shell of Taphon clavella maganensis (holotype at MNHN, Paris)

Scientific classification
- Kingdom: Animalia
- Phylum: Mollusca
- Class: Gastropoda
- Subclass: Caenogastropoda
- Order: Neogastropoda
- Superfamily: Buccinoidea
- Family: Melongenidae
- Genus: Taphon; H. Adams & A. Adams, 1853

Type species
- Fusus striatus G. B. Sowerby I, 1833

Synonyms
- Busycon (Taphon) H. Adams & A. Adams, 1853 (original rank)

= Taphon (gastropod) =

Genus of sea snails

Taphon is a genus of sea snails, marine gastropod molluscs in the family Melongenidae, the crown conches and their allies. In 2026, Fedosov et al. proposed transferring Taphon to Fasciolariidae.

== Description ==
The dextral shell is transversely striated. The whorls are rounded. The aperture is ovate with the fore part produced into a long, slightly-recurved siphonal canal.

== Species ==
- Taphon childsi Scali & Liverani, 2020
- Taphon clavella (Reeve, 1847)

Species brought into synonymy

- Taphon striatum (G. B. Sowerby I, 1833): synonym of Taphon clavella (Reeve, 1847)
