= Hemifusus =

Scientific classification
- Kingdom: Animalia
- Phylum: Mollusca
- Class: Gastropoda
- Subclass: Caenogastropoda
- Order: Neogastropoda
- Superfamily: Buccinoidea
- Family: Melongenidae
- Genus: Hemifusus; Swainson, 1840

Type species
- Pugilina (Hemifusus) colosseus Lamarck, J.B.P.A. de, 1822

Synonyms
- Pugilina (Hemifusus) Swainson, 1840; Semifusus Agassiz, 1846

Genus of gastropods

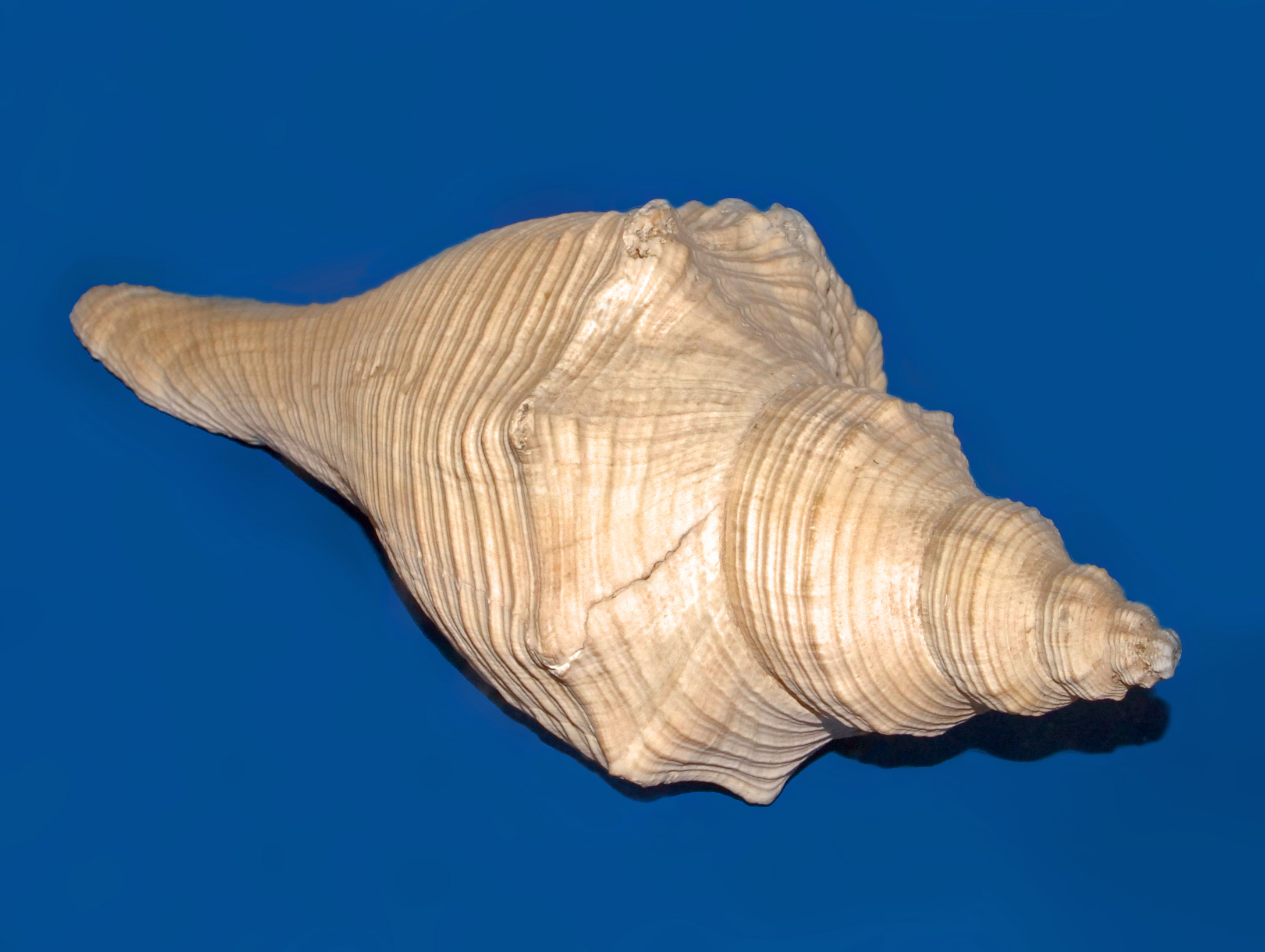
Shell of Hemifusus ternatanus from Japan at the Museo Civico di Storia Naturale di Milano

Hemifusus is a genus of sea snails, marine gastropod molluscs in the family Melongenidae, the crown conches and their allies.

== Description ==
The type description of genus Hemifusus by English malacologist William Swainson reads as follows:

Unequally fusiform, the spire being shorter than aperture; shell ponderous, coronated with compressed spines; and internal and ascending canal at the top of aperture.

== Species ==
Species within the genus Hemifusus include:

- Hemifusus alfi Thach, 2021
- Hemifusus boucheti Thach, 2017
- † Hemifusus charlieleei Harzhauser, Raven & Landau, 2018
- Hemifusus colosseus Lamarck, 1816
- Hemifusus crassacauda Philippi, 1849
- Hemifusus hitoshiikedai Thach, 2020
- Hemifusus kawamurai Kira, 1965
- Hemifusus schuetti Alf & Thach, 2021
- Hemifusus treudei Alf & Thach, 2021
- Hemifusus tuba Gmelin, 1791
- Hemifusus vietnamensis Thach, 2023
- Hemifusus yurikantori Thach, 2017

Species brought into synonymy

- Hemifusus crassicaudus Philippi, 1849: synonym of Hemifusus crassacauda (Philippi, 1849)
- Hemifusus elongatus Lamarck, 1822: synonym of Pugilina elongata Lamarck, 1822: synonym of Brunneifusus ternatanus Gmelin, 1791
- Hemifusus ternatanus Gmelin, 1791: synonym of Brunneifusus ternatanus Gmelin, 1791
- † Hemifusus washingtonianus Weaver, 1912: synonym of † Whitneyella washingtoniana Weaver, 1912 (original combination)
- Hemifusus zhangyii Kosuge, 2008: synonym of Pyrula elongata Lamarck, 1822: synonym of Brunneifusus ternatanus Gmelin, 1791
