= Volegalea dirki =

Scientific classification
- Kingdom: Animalia
- Phylum: Mollusca
- Class: Gastropoda
- Subclass: Caenogastropoda
- Order: Neogastropoda
- Superfamily: Buccinoidea
- Family: Melongenidae
- Genus: Volegalea
- Species: V. dirki

Binomial name
- Volegalea dirki (Nolf, 2007)

Synonyms
- Pugilina dirki Nolf, 2007 (original combination)

Species of gastropod

Volegalea dirki is a species of sea snail, a marine gastropod mollusk in the family Melongenidae, the crown conches and their allies.

== Description ==
The maximum shell size of this species is 90 mm.

== Distribution ==
This species occurs in the Indian Ocean off Southern India.
