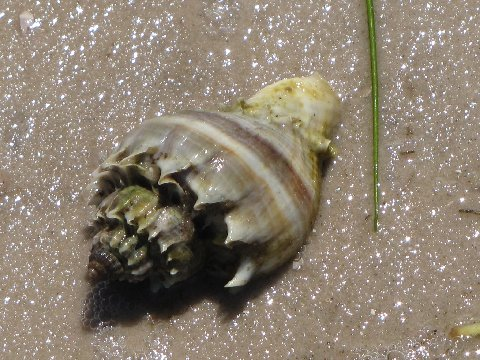

Scientific classification
- Kingdom: Animalia
- Phylum: Mollusca
- Class: Gastropoda
- Subclass: Caenogastropoda
- Order: Neogastropoda
- Family: Melongenidae
- Genus: Melongena
- Species: M. corona

Binomial name
- Melongena corona (Gmelin, 1791)

Synonyms
- Cassidula corona (Gmelin, 1791); Fusus bicolor Say, 1826 (original combination); Hemifusus corona (Gmelin, 1791) (superseded combination); Hemifusus corona var. estephomenos Melvill, 1881; Hemifusus corona var. minor G. B. Sowerby III, 1879; Melongena altispira Pilsbry & Vanatta, 1934; Melongena belknapi Petit, 1852; Melongena bicolor (Say, 1826); Melongena corona altispira Pilsbry & Vanatta, 1934; Melongena corona aspinosa (Dall, 1890); Melongena corona bicolor (Say, 1826); Melongena corona corona (Gmelin, 1791; Melongena corona johnstonei (Clench & Turner, 1956); Melongena corona perspinosa Pilsbry & Vanatta, 1934; Melongena corona sprucecreekensis Tucker, 1994; Melongena corona f. altispira Pilsbry & Vanatta, 1934 (original combination); Melongena pyruloides (DeKay, 1843); Murex corona Gmelin, 1791 (original combination)

= Melongena corona =

Species of gastropod

Melongena corona, common name the Florida crown conch, is a species of sea snail, a marine gastropod mollusk in the family Melongenidae, the crown conches and their allies.

Subspecies

- Melongena corona corona (Gmelin, 1791)
- Melongena corona winnerae Petuch, 2003

== Description ==
The shell of this species is extremely variable in terms of the degree of spiny ornamentation. Some shells are much smoother than others. These snails can be as large as about 5 in (12 cm) long, and are mostly dark brown with irregular bands of white or cream, but an overall light-color yellow form, without banding, is also known. There are small spines on the largest whorl of the smoother forms: the most spiny forms have several rows of spines. The aperture of the shell can be closed at will with an operculum.

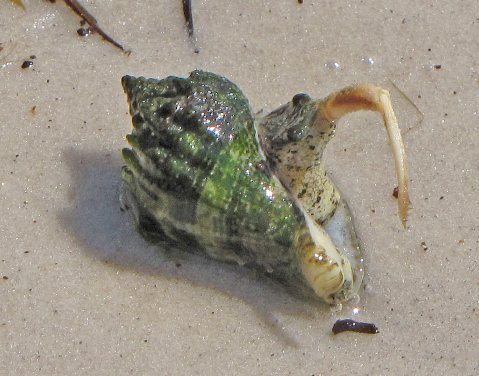
A live Melongena corona rolling over by using its operculum

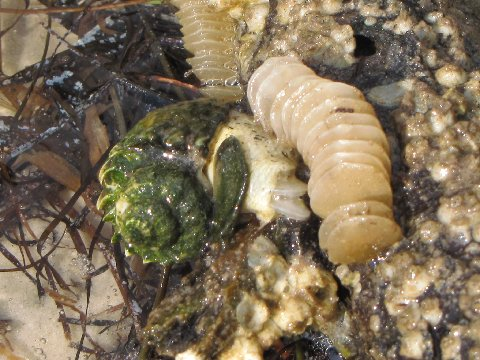
Melongena corona laying eggs.

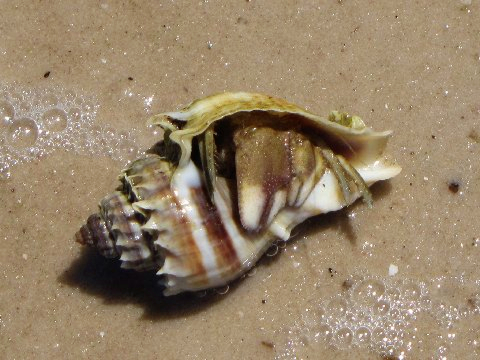
The shell of Melongena corona inhabited by a hermit crab

== Distribution ==
Western Atlantic Ocean: Florida.

== Ecology ==
=== Diet ===
This snail is a predator; it eats other mollusks, including scallops. M. corona is a significant scavenger and detects food using chemical stimuli. It has been recorded feeding on dead horseshoe crabs and on fish scraps. The banded tulip snail, Cinctura hunteria, is commonly eaten by M. corona. Live oysters are a component of the diet of M. corona, but it is not a major oyster predator. M. corona feeds on oysters by inserting its proboscis between the valves of the oyster shell. M. corona also feeds on the common solitary sea squirts Styela plicata and Molgula occidentalis.

=== Predators ===
Melongena corona is known to be prey of the Florida horse conch Triplofusus giganteus and the whitespotted eagle ray Aetobatus narinari.
