= Brunneifusus =

Scientific classification
- Kingdom: Animalia
- Phylum: Mollusca
- Class: Gastropoda
- Subclass: Caenogastropoda
- Order: Neogastropoda
- Superfamily: Buccinoidea
- Family: Melongenidae
- Genus: Brunneifusus; Dekkers, 2018

Type species
- Murex ternatanus Gmelin, 1791

Genus of gastropods

Brunneifusus is a genus of sea snails, marine gastropod molluscs in the family Melongenidae, the crown conches and their allies.

== Species ==
Species within the genus Brunneifusus include:

- Brunneifusus haszprunari Thach, 2021
- Brunneifusus ternatanus (Gmelin, 1791)

Synonyms

- Brunneifusus carinifer (Habe & Kosuge, 1966): synonym of Brunneifusus ternatanus (Gmelin, 1791)
- Brunneifusus cariniferus (Habe & Kosuge, 1966): synonym of Brunneifusus carinifer (Habe & Kosuge, 1966) (incorrect spelling of specific epithet)
