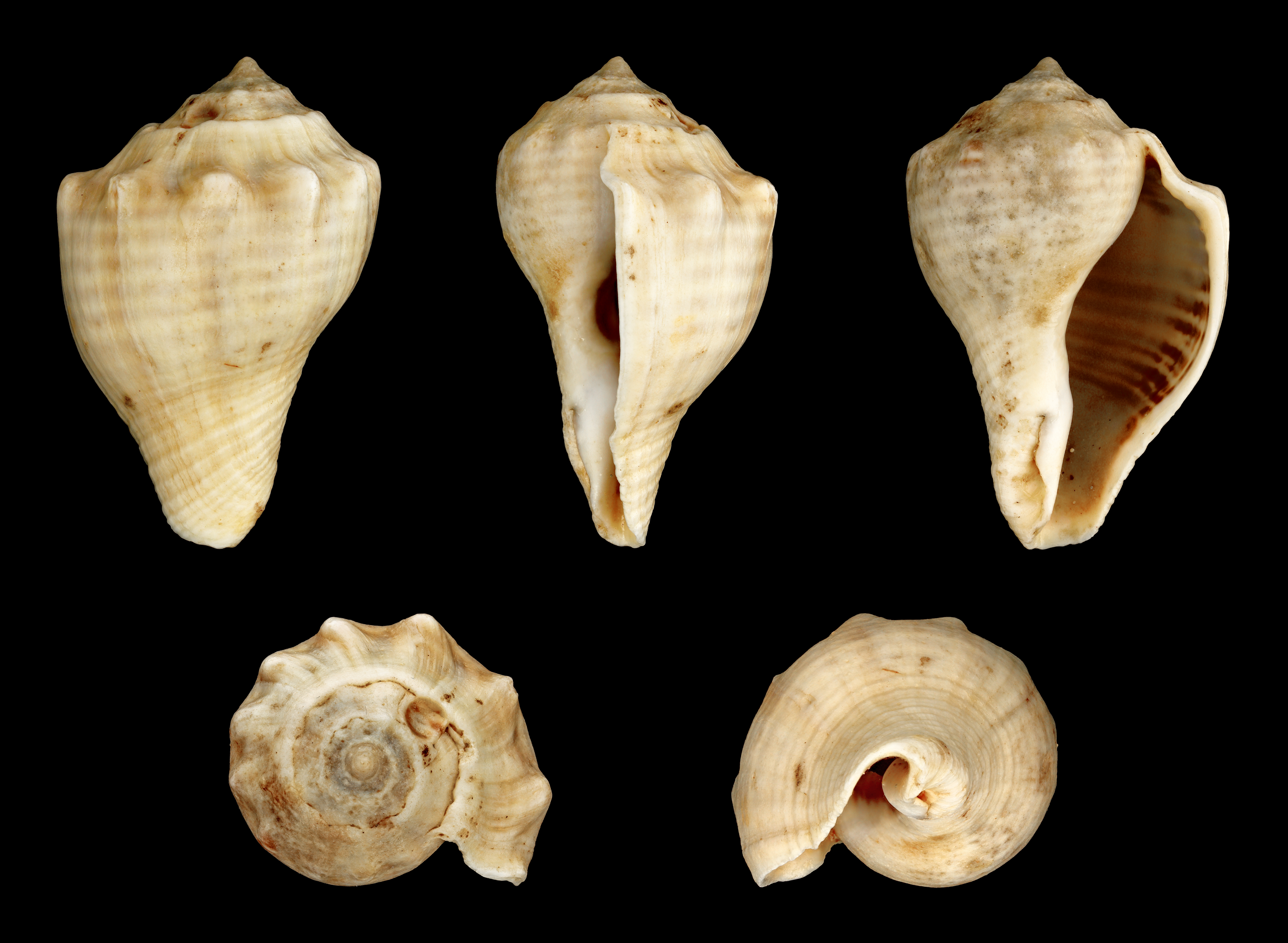
- Volema pyrum shell

Scientific classification
- Kingdom: Animalia
- Phylum: Mollusca
- Class: Gastropoda
- Subclass: Caenogastropoda
- Order: Neogastropoda
- Family: Melongenidae
- Genus: Volema
- Species: V. pyrum

Binomial name
- Volema pyrum (Gmelin, 1791)

Synonyms
- Buccinum pyrum Gmelin, 1791; Buccinum spadiceum Gmelin, 1791; Galeodes paradisaica (Röding, 1798) (misspelling); Galeodes paradisiaca (Röding, 1798); Melongena paradisaica (Röding, 1798) (misspelling); Melongena paradisiaca (Röding, 1798); Melongena pirum Dautzenberg, 1929; Murex calcaratus Dillwyn, 1817; Pugilina laevis Schumacher, 1817; Pyrula calcaratus Hanley, 1856; Pyrula citrina Lamarck, 1822; Volema cotonea Röding, 1798; Volema nuxmoschata Röding, 1798; Volema paradisiaca Röding, 1798; Volema pyrum Röding, 1798; Volema pyrum nodosa (Lamarck, 1822)

= Volema pyrum =

Species of gastropod

Volema pyrum is a species of sea snail, a marine gastropod mollusk in the family Melongenidae, the crown conches and their allies.

== Nomenclature ==
Abbott & Dance (1986: 176) treated Gmelin's name as preoccupied by Linnaeus, but Gmelin named his species as a Buccinum, not a Murex.

== Description ==
The size of the adult shell varies between 40 mm and 52 mm. The shell is cream-colored (with top of the spire being darker) and somewhat pear-shaped, and is mostly smooth with faint ridges on the lower half of the body whorl. The shell of Volema paradisiaca lacks any knobs or spines.

== Distribution ==
This species occurs in the Indian Ocean off Madagascar, Mozambique and Tanzania; in the Singapore Strait.
