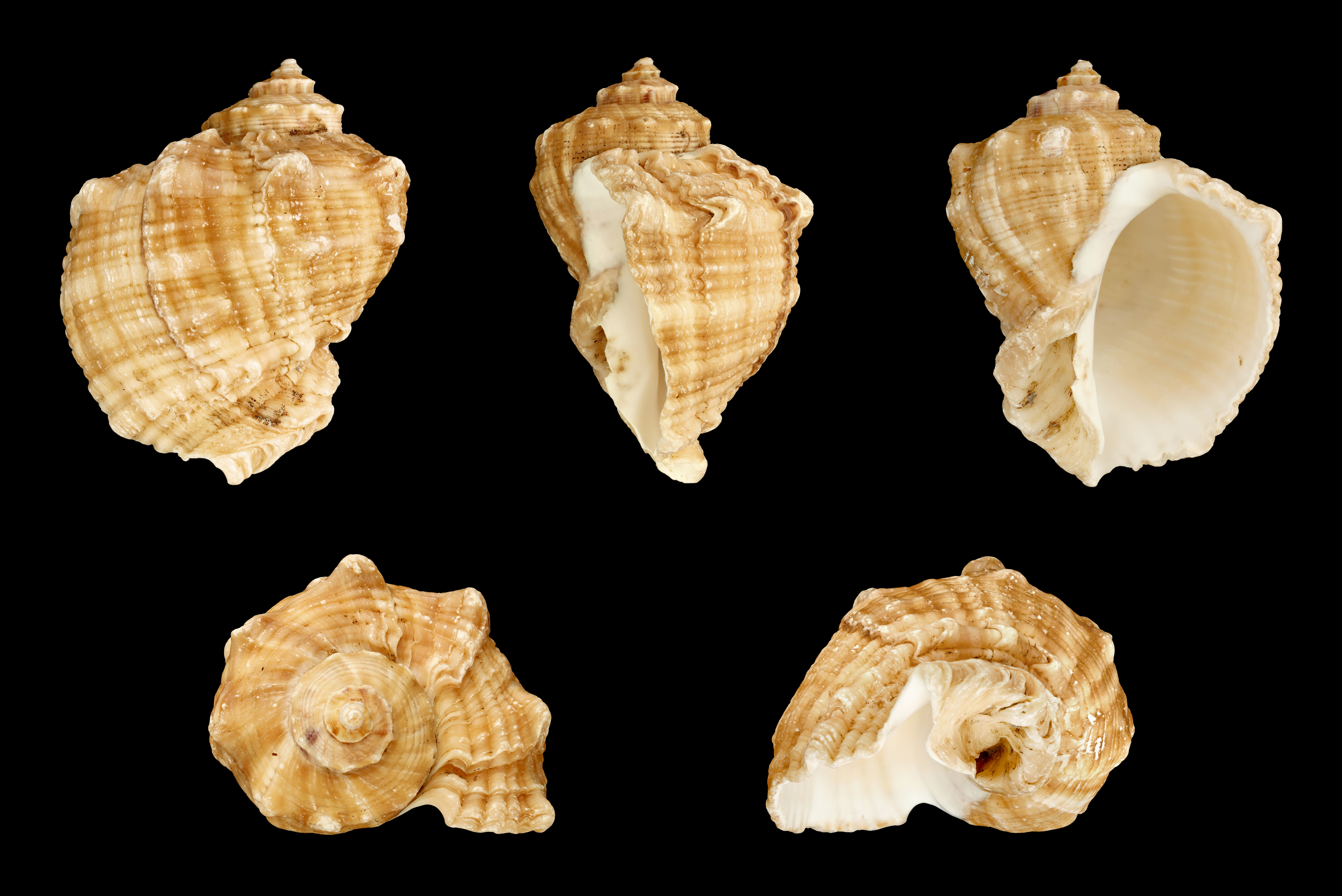
- Rapana bezoar Linnaeus, 1767

Scientific classification
- Kingdom: Animalia
- Phylum: Mollusca
- Class: Gastropoda
- Subclass: Caenogastropoda
- Order: Neogastropoda
- Family: Muricidae
- Genus: Rapana
- Species: R. bezoar

Binomial name
- Rapana bezoar (Linnaeus, 1767)

Synonyms
- Buccinum bezoar Linnaeus, 1767; Rapana foliacea Schumacher, 1817; Volema pheata Röding, 1798

= Rapana bezoar =

Species of gastropod

Rapana bezoar is a species of sea snail, a marine gastropod mollusc in the family Muricidae, the murex snails or rock snails.

== Distribution ==
R. bezoar is found in the Indo-West Pacific in warm water at depths of 25-37 meters.
