= Brunneifusus ternatanus =

Scientific classification
- Kingdom: Animalia
- Phylum: Mollusca
- Class: Gastropoda
- Subclass: Caenogastropoda
- Order: Neogastropoda
- Family: Melongenidae
- Genus: Brunneifusus
- Species: B. ternatanus

Binomial name
- Brunneifusus ternatanus (Gmelin, 1791)

Synonyms
- Brunneifusus carinifer (Habe & Kosuge, 1966); Brunneifusus cariniferus (Habe & Kosuge, 1966) (incorrect spelling of specific epithet); Buccinum tuba Gmelin, 1791; Fusus pyrulaceus Lamarck, 1816; Hemifusus carinifer Habe & Kosuge, 1966 (original combination); Hemifusus elongatus (Lamarck, 1822); Hemifusus ternatanus (Gmelin, 1791); Hemifusus zhangyii Kosuge, 2008; Lenifusus elongatus (Lamarck, 1822); Murex ternatanus Gmelin, 1791 (original combination); Pugilina elongata (Lamarck, 1822); Pugilina ternatanus (Gmelin, 1791); Pyrula elongata Lamarck, 1822 (original combination)

Species of gastropod

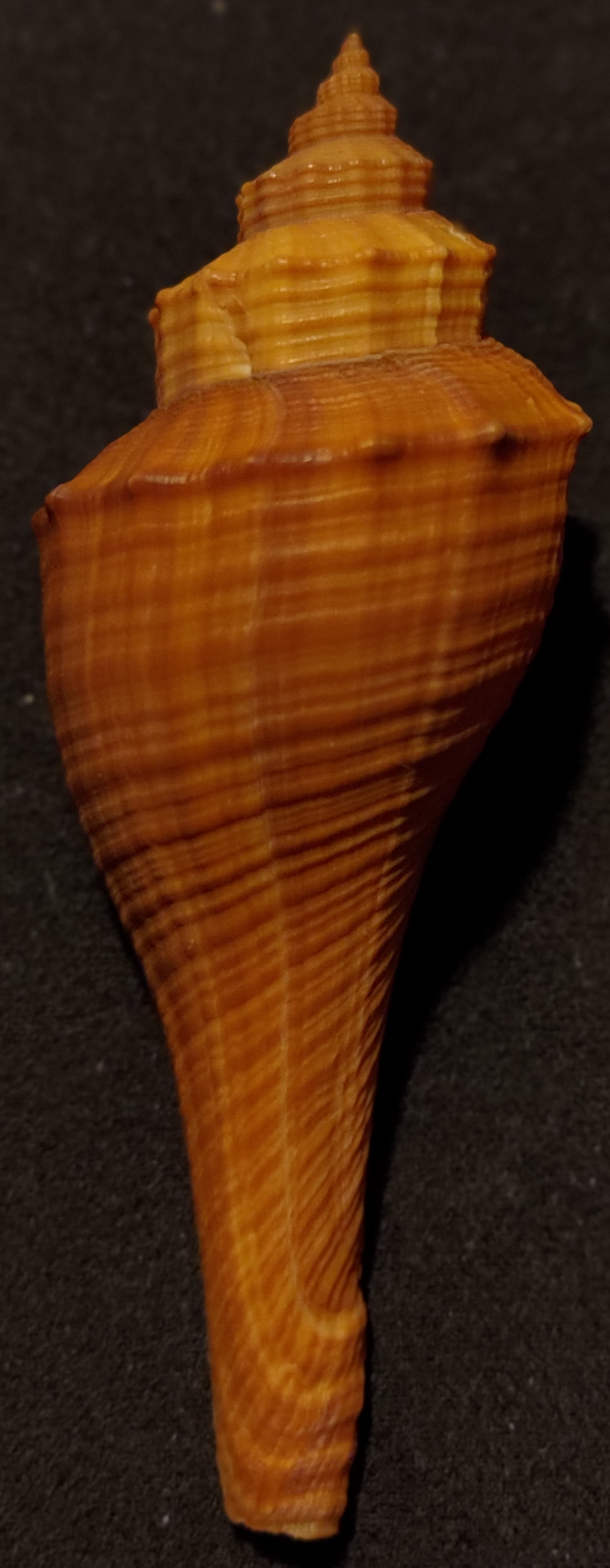

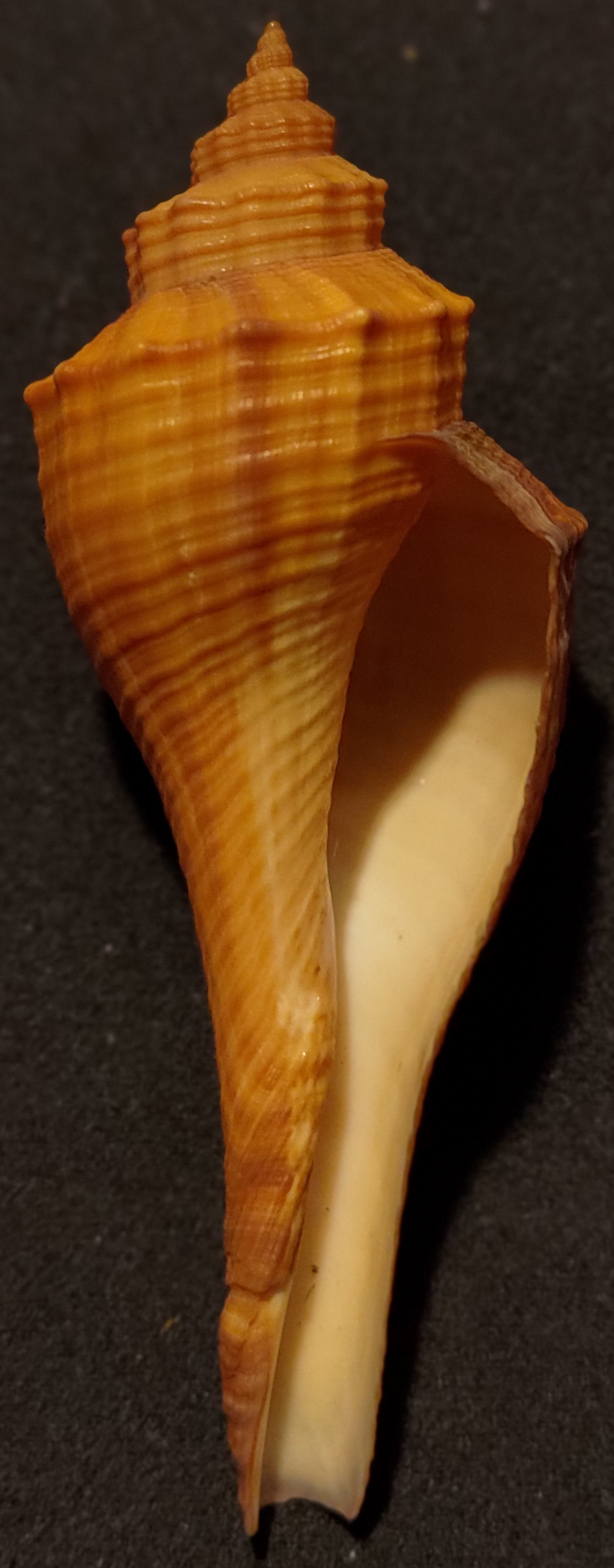

Brunneifusus ternatanus, common name ternate false fusus, is a species of sea snails, marine gastropod molluscs in the family Melongenidae, the crown conches and their allies.

== Description ==
Brunneifusus ternatanus has a shell that reaches a length of 70 – 270 mm. The shape of this shell is slender, fusiform, with a tall spire and a long siphonal canal, but it shows high degree of geographical variations in sculpture and color. The colour is usually light brown, while the aperture is light cream to whitish.

== Distribution ==
This species can be found in Japan, Philippines and western Pacific.
