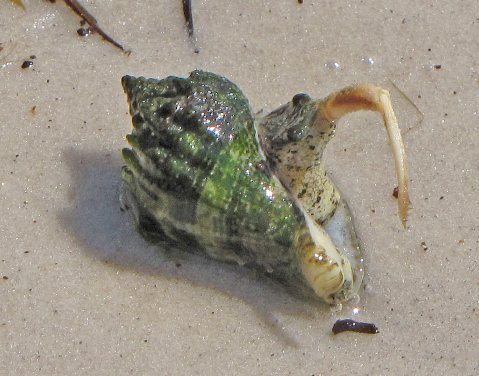
- A live Melongena corona in the process of rolling over using its operculum

Scientific classification
- Kingdom: Animalia
- Phylum: Mollusca
- Class: Gastropoda
- Subclass: Caenogastropoda
- Order: Neogastropoda
- Superfamily: Buccinoidea
- Family: Melongenidae; Gill, 1871 (1854)

Type species
- Gill, 1871 (1854)

Synonyms
- Cassidulidae Gray, 1854 (invalid: type genus a junior homonym of Cassidulus Lamarck, 1801 [Echinodermata], which is itself the type genus of Cassidulidae L. Agassiz & Desor, 1847); Galeodidae Thiele, 1925 (invalid: type genus a junior homonym of Galeodes Olivier, 1791 [Arachnida]); † Heligmotomidae Adegoke, 1977; Melongeninae Gill, 1871 (1854); Volemidae Winckworth, 1945

= Melongenidae =

Family of gastropods

The Melongenidae, the crown conchs and their relatives, are a taxonomic family of large to very large marine gastropods in the superfamily Buccinoidea.

== Taxonomy ==
For a while prior to 2004, the genera Busycon and Busycotypus were placed in the Melongenidae. Then, in 2004, based on their digestive systems and on cladistic analysis by Kosyan & Kantor (2004), these two genera were moved to the family Busyconidae within the superfamily Buccinoidea.

According to the taxonomy of the Gastropoda by Bouchet & Rocroi (2005), the Melongenidae consists of two subfamilies:

- Subfamily Melongeninae Gill, 1871 (1854) - synonyms: Cassidulidae Gray, 1854 (inv.); Galeodidae Thiele, 1925 (inv.); Volemidae Winckworth, 1945; Heligmotomidae Adegoke, 1977
- Subfamily Echinofulgurinae Petuch, 1994

== Genera ==
Genera in the family Melongenidae include:

- Brunneifusus Dekkers, 2018
- Hemifusus Swainson, 1840
- Lenifusus Dekkers, 2018
- Melongena Schumacher, 1817 - crown conchs
- Pugilina Schumacher, 1817
- Saginafusus Wenz, 1943
- † Sycostoma Cox, 1931
- Taphon H. Adams & A. Adams, 1853
- Volegalea Iredale, 1938
- Volema Röding, 1798

Genera brought into synonymy

- Cassidulus Gray, 1854: synonym of Pugilina Schumacher, 1817
- Galeodes Röding, 1798 : synonym of Melongena Schumacher, 1817
- Semifusus Agassiz, 1846 synonym of Hemifusus Swainson, 1840
- Thalessa H. Adams & A. Adams, 1853: synonym of Volema Röding, 1798
