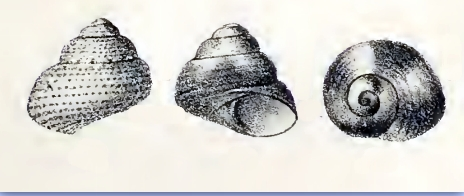
- Drawing with three views of a shell of Cantharidella picturata

Scientific classification
- Kingdom: Animalia
- Phylum: Mollusca
- Class: Gastropoda
- Subclass: Vetigastropoda
- Order: Trochida
- Superfamily: Trochoidea
- Family: Trochidae
- Genus: Cantharidella; Pilsbry, 1889

Type species
- Gibbula picturata A. Adams & Angas, 1864

= Cantharidella =

Genus of gastropods

Cantharidella is a genus of small sea snails, marine gastropod molluscs in the subfamily Trochinae of the family Trochidae, the top snails.

== Description ==
This genus consists of small forms with much the aspect of tiny Cantharidus. They are usually polished, narrowly or not perforate. The shell is conical, and elongated.

== Distribution ==
This genus of marine species occurs off India, Sri Lanka, the Philippines and Australia (New South Wales, South Australia, Tasmania, Victoria, Western Australia).

== Species ==
Species within the genus Cantharidella include:

- Cantharidella balteata (Philippi, 1849)
- Cantharidella beachportensis Cotton & Godfrey, 1934
- Cantharidella ocellina (Hedley, 1911)
- Cantharidella picturata (A. Adams & Angas, 1864)
- Cantharidella rottnestensis Verco, 1911
- Cantharidella tiberiana (Crosse, 1863)

Species brought into synonymy

- Cantharidella aurea Tenison-Woods, J.E., 1876: synonym of Cantharidella tiberiana (Crosse, 1863)
- Cantharidella tesselata Tenison-Woods, J.E., 1878: synonym of Cantharidella tiberiana (Crosse, 1863)
- Cantharidella tesselata (A. Adams, 1853): synonym of Cantharidus tessellatus (A. Adams, 1853)
