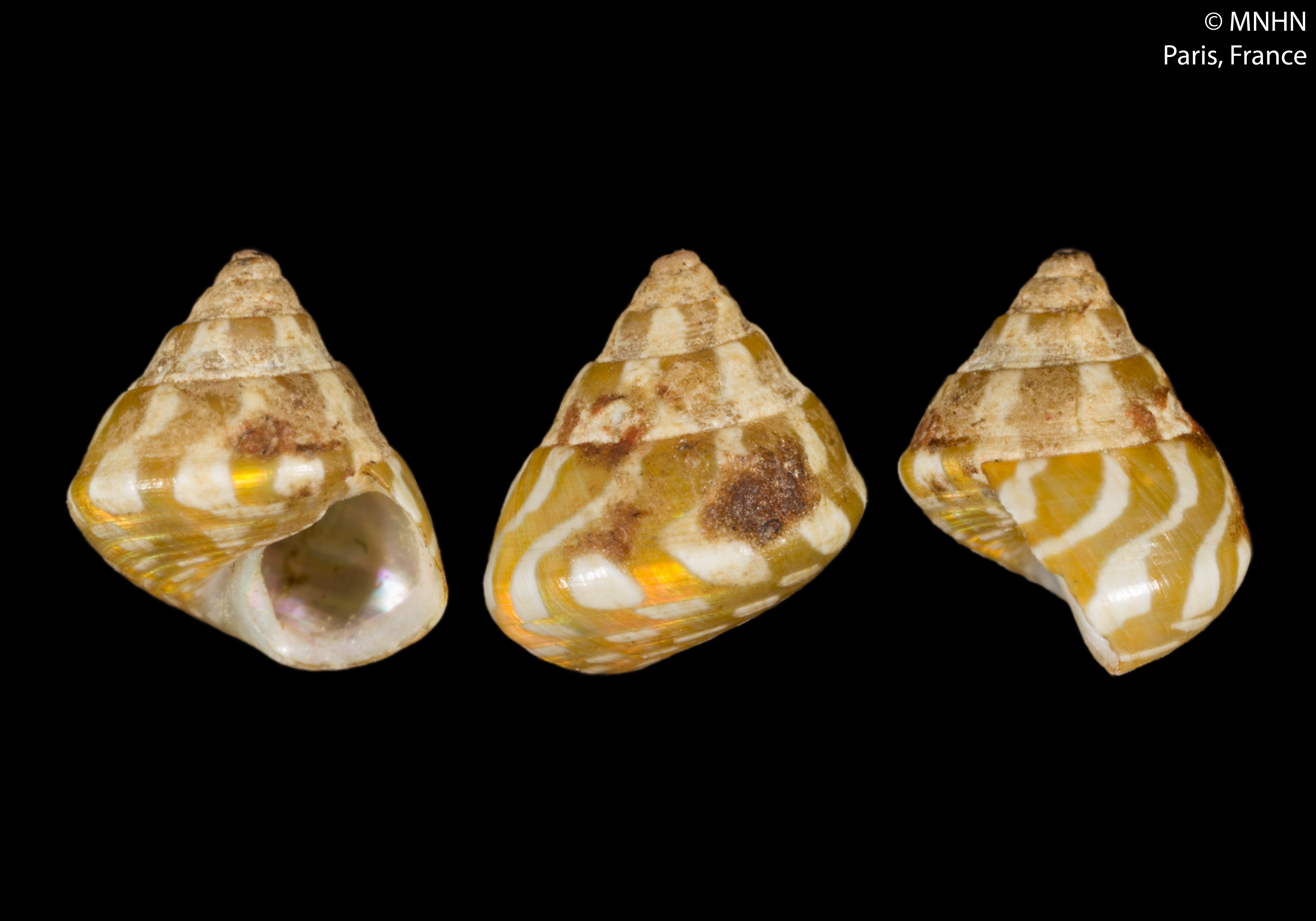
- Shell of Cratidentium tiberianum (syntype at MNHN, Paris)

Scientific classification
- Kingdom: Animalia
- Phylum: Mollusca
- Class: Gastropoda
- Subclass: Vetigastropoda
- Order: Trochida
- Superfamily: Trochoidea
- Family: Trochidae
- Genus: Cratidentium; K. M. Donald & Spencer, 2016

Type species
- Trochus tiberianus Crosse, 1863

= Cratidentium =

Genus of gastropods

Cratidentium is a genus of small sea snails, marine gastropod mollusks in the family Trochidae, the top-snails.

== Species ==
Species within the genus Cratidentium include:

- Cratidentium balteatum (Philippi, 1850)
- Cratidentium beachportense (Cotton & Godfrey, 1934)
- Cratidentium ocellinum (Hedley, 1911)
- Cratidentium rottnestense (B. R. Wilson, 1993)
- Cratidentium tiberianum (Crosse, 1863)
