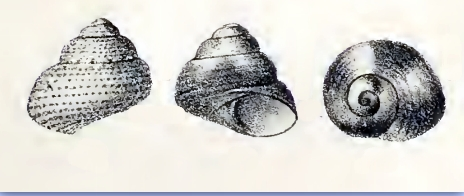
- Drawing with three views of a shell of Cantharidella picturata

Scientific classification
- Kingdom: Animalia
- Phylum: Mollusca
- Class: Gastropoda
- Subclass: Vetigastropoda
- Order: Trochida
- Superfamily: Trochoidea
- Family: Trochidae
- Genus: Cantharidella
- Species: C. picturata

Binomial name
- Cantharidella picturata (A. Adams & Angas, 1864)

Synonyms
- Gibbula picturata Adams, A. & Angas, G.F. 1864; Trochus albugo Watson, R.B., 1886 (juvenile form); Trochus picturatus Fischer

= Cantharidella picturata =

Species of gastropod

Cantharidella picturata, common name the painted kelp shell, is a species of sea snail, a marine gastropod mollusk in the family Trochidae, the top snails.

== Description ==
The size of the shell varies between 4 mm and 8 mm. The small, narrowly umbilicate shell has a conical shape. It is excessively variable in coloration, the following patterns are most usual:

1. Whitish with longitudinal broad or narrow red or crimson flames reaching to the periphery, the ground-color and base dotted with red. The flames are frequently interrupted in the middle by a dotted zone.
2. The ground-color is clear yellowish or whitish, the lirae dotted with red. This pattern frequently shows short flames of red under the sutures. the entire surface is purplish black, the umbilicus green-tinged.
3. Except the last variety, all are whitish around the umbilicus. In all, the inside of the umbilicus and the columella are tinged with green.

The spire is elevated, conical, rather obtuse. The sutures are impressed. The five to six whorls are convex. They are encircled by lirae, usually 5 or 6 in number on the penultimate whorl, but very variable. The body whorl shows a prominent rib at the periphery, convex beneath. The aperture is quadrangular, delicately ribbed within and iridescent, green predominating. The columella is arcuate above, then straight and oblique, terminating near the base in a slight denticle.

This is a beautiful little species, usually either flamed with dark red or dotted all over with pink. The ground-color sometimes has a green cast, or is pink.

== Distribution ==
This marine species is endemic to Australia and occurs off Queensland, New South Wales, Victoria and Tasmania.
