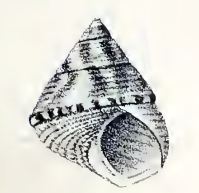
- Drawing of a shell of Cratidentium tiberianum

Scientific classification
- Kingdom: Animalia
- Phylum: Mollusca
- Class: Gastropoda
- Subclass: Vetigastropoda
- Order: Trochida
- Superfamily: Trochoidea
- Family: Trochidae
- Genus: Cratidentium
- Species: C. tiberianum

Binomial name
- Cratidentium tiberianum (Crosse, 1863)

Synonyms
- Cantharidella aurea Tenison-Woods, J.E., 1876; Cantharidella tesselata Tenison-Woods, J.E., 1878; Cantharidus decoratus Adams & Angas, 1864; Cantharidus luculentus A. Adams & Angas, 1864; Cantharidus tiberianus Angas, 1867; Gibbula aurea Tenison-Woods, 1876; Thalotia tesselata Tenison-Woods, 1878; Trochus tiberianus Crosse, 1863 (original description)

= Cratidentium tiberianum =

Species of gastropod

Cratidentium tiberianum is a species of sea snail, a marine gastropod mollusk in the family Trochidae, the top snails.

== Description ==
The size of the shell varies between 4 mm and 9 mm. The imperforate, rather thin shell has a conical shape. It is olivaceous with nacreous reflections. It is ornamented with flexuous longitudinal grayish streaks. The spire is moderately elevated. The suture is impressed. The 5½ to 6 whorls are subplanate with the body whorl obtusely angulated. The base of the shell is obsoletely striated and covered with spots of grayish-white. The aperture is oblique, quadrate, inside white and nacreous. The columella is somewhat expanded. The outer lip is simple and acute.

== Distribution ==
This marine species is endemic to Australia and occurs off New South Wales, Victoria, South Australia and Tasmania,
