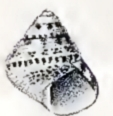
- Drawing of a shell of Cratidentium balteata

Scientific classification
- Kingdom: Animalia
- Phylum: Mollusca
- Class: Gastropoda
- Subclass: Vetigastropoda
- Order: Trochida
- Superfamily: Trochoidea
- Family: Trochidae
- Genus: Cratidentium
- Species: C. balteatum

Binomial name
- Cratidentium balteatum (R. A. Philippi, 1850)

Synonyms
- Cantharidella balteata (R. A. Philippi, 1850); Trochus balteatus Philippi, R.A. 1849 (original description); Trochus smaltata Fischer, P. 1879

= Cratidentium balteatum =

Species of gastropod

Cratidentium balteata, common name the tessellated top shell, is a species of sea snail, a marine gastropod mollusk in the family Trochidae, the top snails.

== Description ==
The height of the shell is 7 mm, its diameter 6 mm. The shell is solid for its small size, perforate, nearly exactly conical in form, and consists of 6 whorls. The upper whorls are almost planulate, while the body whorl, which is as high as all the others together, is bluntly angulated. The upper whorls are encircled around their lower borders by a white girdle articulated with vertical black lines, and which is continued upon the periphery of the body whorl. Above this girdle are 5 elevated transverse lines, and upon the base about 12 inconspicuous ones. The columella is almost vertical, rounded, with a slight tubercle in the middle, and forms an angle with the basal lip. The color of the shell is pale brown, and besides the above described girdle has large deep brown maculations below the suture. The spiral lirae are punctate with black. The base shows oblique streaks, formed by the coalescence of black dots.

== Distribution ==
This marine species is endemic to Australia and occurs off South Australia, Victoria and Tasmania.
