= Cratidentium beachportense =

Scientific classification
- Kingdom: Animalia
- Phylum: Mollusca
- Class: Gastropoda
- Subclass: Vetigastropoda
- Order: Trochida
- Superfamily: Trochoidea
- Family: Trochidae
- Genus: Cratidentium
- Species: C. beachportense

Binomial name
- Cratidentium beachportense (Cotton & Godfrey, 1934)

Synonyms
- Cantharidella beachportensis Cotton & Godfrey, 1934

Species of gastropod

Cratidentium beachportense, common name the Beachport top shell, is a species of sea snail, a marine gastropod mollusk in the family Trochidae, the top snails.

The size of the shell attains 6 mm. This marine species is endemic to Australia and occurs off South Australia and Western Australia.
