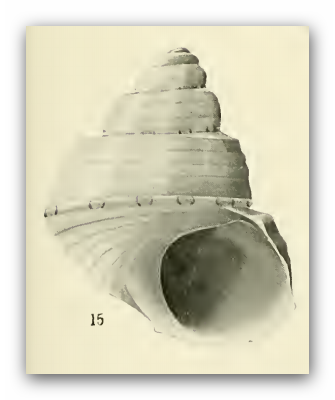
- Original image of a shell of Cratidentium ocellinum

Scientific classification
- Kingdom: Animalia
- Phylum: Mollusca
- Class: Gastropoda
- Subclass: Vetigastropoda
- Order: Trochida
- Superfamily: Trochoidea
- Family: Trochidae
- Genus: Cratidentium
- Species: C. ocellinum

Binomial name
- Cratidentium ocellinum (Hedley, 1911)

Synonyms
- Cantharidella ocellina (Hedley, 1911); Gibbula ocellina Hedley, C. 1911

= Cratidentium ocellinum =

Species of gastropod

Cratidentium ocellinum, common name the eyelet top shell, is a species of sea snail, a marine gastropod mollusk in the family Trochidae, the top snails.

== Description ==
The size of the shell attains 4 mm. The small, solid, imperforate shell has a conical shape with a gradated spire with five whorls. It is prominently keeled at the periphery and again at the shoulder. Below the periphery the colour is uniform buff, above it broad, radial stripes of buff pink, alternate with white. Along the periphery are pairs of dashes of madder brown, sometimes these enclose a tinted space and have a background of opaque white, thus assuming an ocellated aspect. The apex is pink. The base of the shell shows seven fiat evenly-spaced concentric riblets. A strong, revolving cord defines the periphery and ascends the spire. The last and penultimate whorls have four spiral riblets above the periphery, the uppermost stronger and forming the angle of a subsutural shelf. The upper whorls are smooth. The aperture is round. The simple outer lip is dentate by the spirals. The columella is perpendicular.

== Distribution ==
This marine species is endemic to Australia and occurs off South Australia.
