= Cratidentium rottnestense =

Scientific classification
- Kingdom: Animalia
- Phylum: Mollusca
- Class: Gastropoda
- Subclass: Vetigastropoda
- Order: Trochida
- Superfamily: Trochoidea
- Family: Trochidae
- Genus: Cratidentium
- Species: C. rottnestense

Binomial name
- Cratidentium rottnestense (B. R. Wilson, 1993)

Synonyms
- Cantharidella rottnestensis B. R. Wilson, 1993

Species of gastropod

Cratidentium rottnestense is a species of sea snail, a marine gastropod mollusk in the family Trochidae, the top snails.

The size of the shell attains 2 mm. This marine species is endemic to Australia and is found off the coast of Western Australia.
