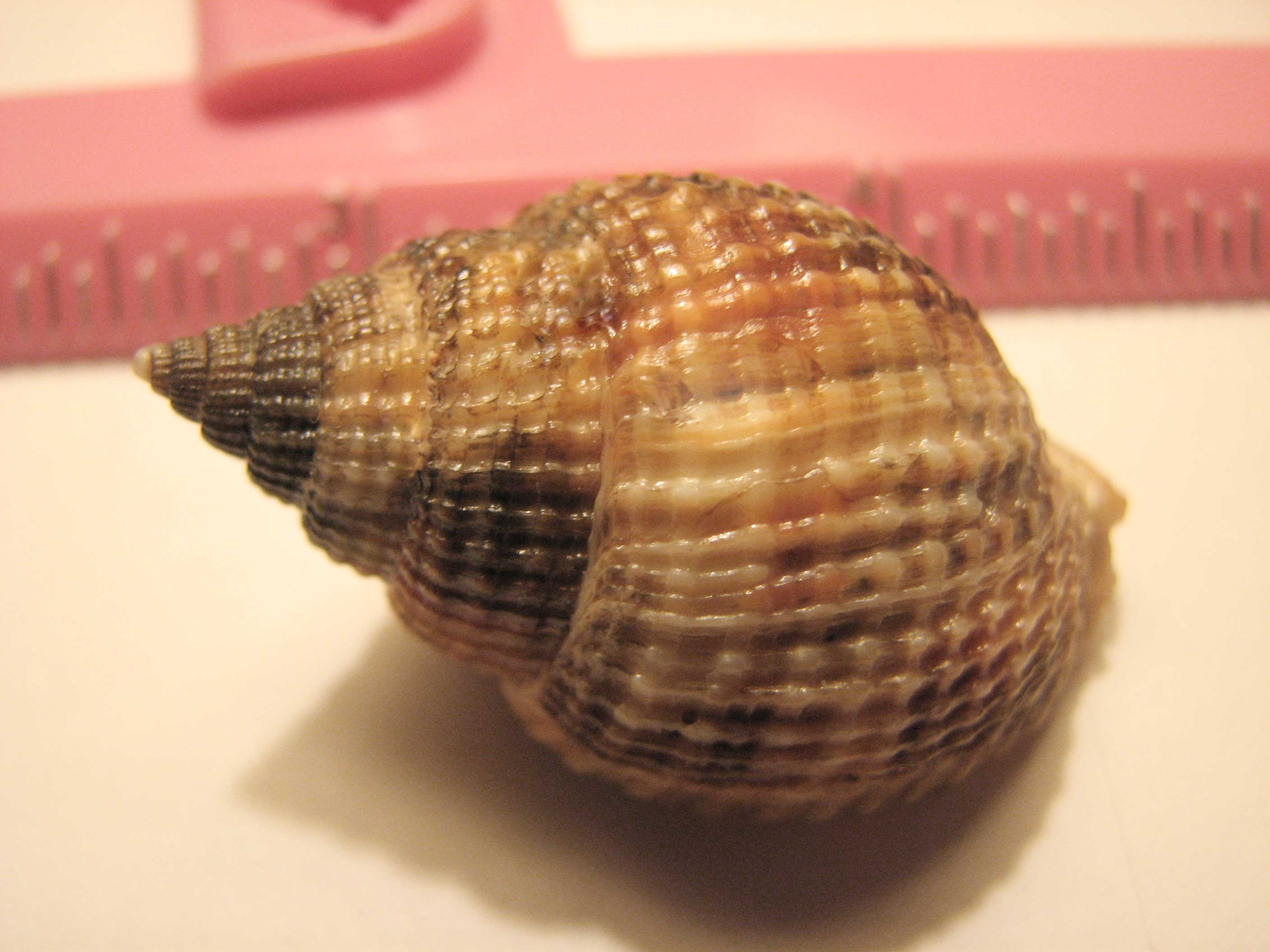
- Abapertural view of shell of Cancellaria reticulata

Scientific classification
- Kingdom: Animalia
- Phylum: Mollusca
- Class: Gastropoda
- Subclass: Caenogastropoda
- Order: Neogastropoda
- Superfamily: Volutoidea
- Family: Cancellariidae
- Genus: Cancellaria; Lamarck, 1799

Type species
- Voluta reticulata Linnaeus, 1767

Synonyms
- Cancellaria (Cancellaria) Lamarck, 1799 · accepted, alternate representation; Cancellaria (Euclia) H. Adams & A. Adams, 1854 · accepted, alternate representation; Cancellaria (Habesolatia) Kuroda, 1965 · accepted, alternate representation; Progabbia Dall, 1918

= Cancellaria =

Genus of gastropods

Cancellaria is a genus of medium-sized to large sea snails, marine gastropod mollusks in the family Cancellariidae, the nutmeg snails.

== Species ==
Species within this genus include:

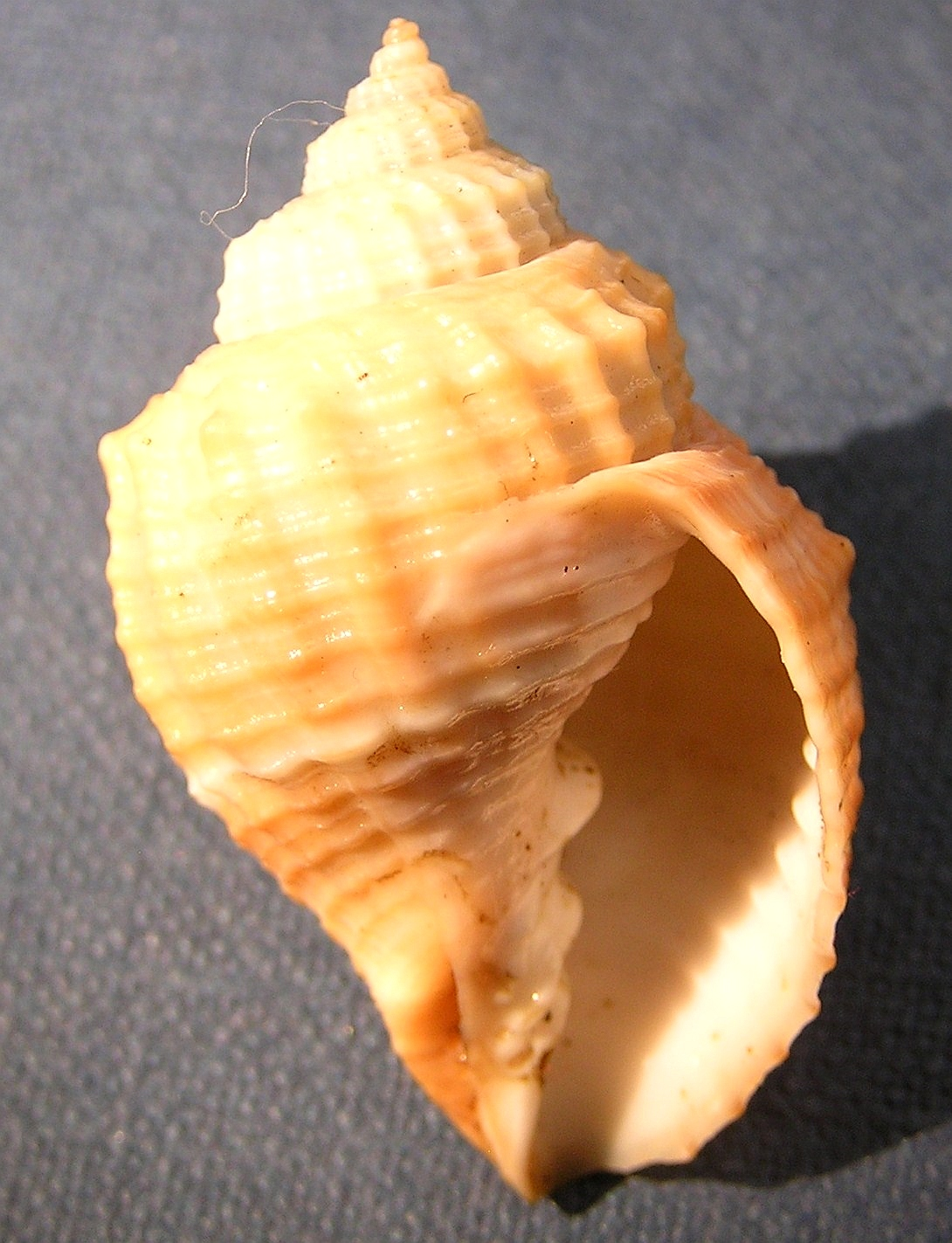
Cancellaria (Euclia) balboae

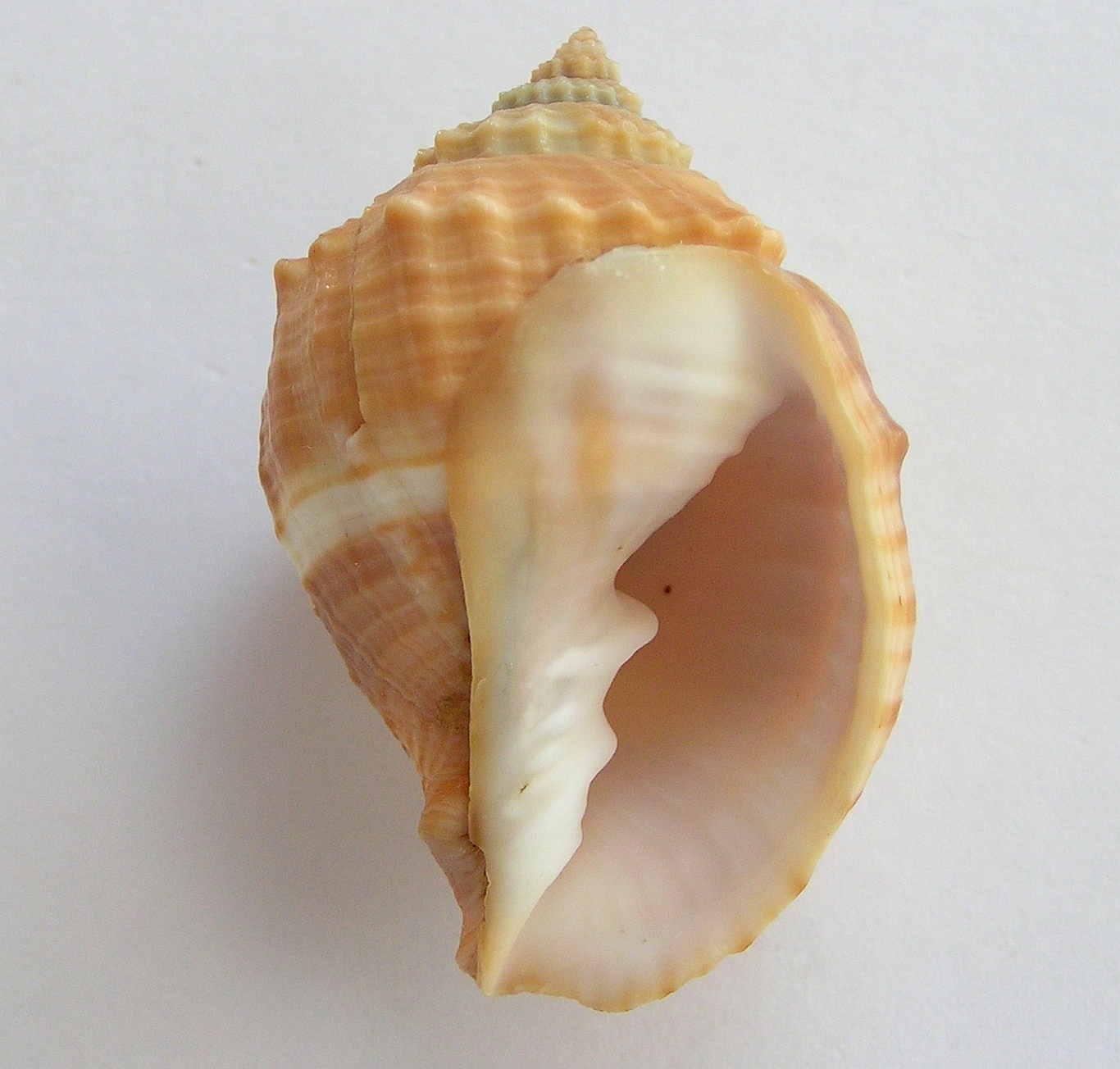
Cancellaria (Euclia) cassidiformis

- Cancellaria adelae Pilsbry, 1940
- Cancellaria africana Petit, 1970
- Cancellaria agalma Melvill & Standen, 1901
- Cancellaria albida Hinds, 1843
- † Cancellaria bajaensis Perrilliat & Cristín, 2016
- Cancellaria candida Sowerby I, 1832
- Cancellaria coctilis Reeve, 1856
- Cancellaria coltrorum Harasewych & Petit, 2014
- † Cancellaria conradiana Dall, 1889
- Cancellaria cooperii Gabb, 1865
- Cancellaria corrosa Reeve, 1856
- Cancellaria crawfordiana Dall, 1892
- Cancellaria cremata Hinds, 1843
- Cancellaria crenulata Deshayes, 1835
- Cancellaria darwini Petit, 1970
- Cancellaria decussata Sowerby I, 1832
- Cancellaria elata Hinds, 1843
- Cancellaria euetrios Barnard, 1959
- Cancellaria fusca Sowerby III, 1889
- Cancellaria gemmulata Sowerby I, 1832
- Cancellaria indentata Sowerby I, 1832
- Cancellaria io Dall, 1896
- Cancellaria jayana Keen, 1958
- Cancellaria littoriniformis Sowerby I, 1832
- Cancellaria lyrata A. Adams & Reeve, 1850
- Cancellaria mediamericana Petuch, 1998
- Cancellaria nassa Roissy, 1805
- Cancellaria obesa Sowerby I, 1832
- Cancellaria obtusa Deshayes, 1830
- Cancellaria ovata Sowerby I, 1832
- † Cancellaria paleocenica Perrilliat & Cristín, 2016
- Cancellaria peruviana Strong, 1954
- Cancellaria petuchi Harasewych, Petit & Verhecken, 1992
- Cancellaria plebeja Thiele, 1925
- Cancellaria reticulata (Linnaeus, 1767)
- Cancellaria richardpetiti Petuch, 1987
- Cancellaria rosewateri Petit, 1983
- Cancellaria semperiana Crosse, 1863
- Cancellaria souverbiei Crosse, 1868
- Cancellaria thomasiana Crosse, 1861
- Cancellaria turrita Sowerby II, 1874: species inquirenda
- Cancellaria umbilicata Lesson, 1842 (nomen dubium)
- Cancellaria uniangulata Deshayes, 1830
- Cancellaria urceolata Hinds, 1843
- Cancellaria ventricosa Hinds, 1843

Subgenus Cancellaria (Crawfordina) Dall, 1919
synonym of Cancellaria Lamarck, 1799

- Cancellaria (Crawfordina) stuardoi McLean & Andrade, 1982: synonym of Merica stuardoi (McLean & Andrade, 1982)

Subgenus Cancellaria (Euclia) H. Adams & A. Adams, 1854
synonym of Euclia H. Adams & A. Adams, 1854 (superseded rank)

- Cancellaria (Euclia) balboae Pilsbry, 1931: synonym of Euclia balboae (Pilsbry, 1931)
- Cancellaria (Euclia) cassidiformis G.B. Sowerby I, 1832: synonym of Euclia cassidiformis (G. B. Sowerby I, 1832)
- Cancellaria (Euclia) laurettae Petit & Harasewych, 1998: synonym of Euclia laurettae (Petit & Harasewych, 1998)

Subgenus Cancellaria (Habesolatia) Kuroda, 1965
synonym of Cancellaria Lamarck, 1799

- Cancellaria (Habesolatia) nodulifera G.B. Sowerby I, 1825: synonym of † Cancellaria rothi O. Semper, 1861

Subgenus Cancellaria (Hertleinia) Marks, 1949; synonym of Hertleinia J. G. Marks, 1949

- Cancellaria (Hertleinia) mitriformis G.B. Sowerby I, 1832: synonym of Hertleinia mitriformis (G.B. Sowerby I, 1832)

Subgenus Cancellaria (Massyla) H. Adams & A. Adams, 1854
synonym of Massyla H. Adams & A. Adams, 1854

- Cancellaria (Massyla) cumingiana Petit de la Saussaye, 1844: synonym of Massyla cumingiana (Petit de la Saussaye, 1844)

=== Species names brought into synonymy ===
- Cancellaria aqualica Petit & Harasewych, 1986: synonym of Merica aqualica (Petit & Harasewych, 1986)
- Cancellaria boucheti Petit & Harasewych, 1986: synonym of Merica boucheti (Petit & Harasewych, 1986)
- Cancellaria cancellata: synonym of Bivetiella cancellata (Linnaeus, 1767)
- Cancellaria citharella Lamarck, 1822: synonym of Cythara striata Schumacher, 1817
- Cancellaria corrugata Hinds, 1843: synonym of Massyla corrugata (Hinds, 1843)
- Cancellaria elegans G. B. Sowerby I, 1822: synonym of Merica elegans (G. B. Sowerby I, 1822)
- Cancellaria ghiorum Costa, 1993: synonym of Cancellaria crawfordiana Dall, 1891
- Cancellaria grayi Tryon, 1885: synonym of Merica asperella (Lamarck, 1822)
- Cancellaria haemastoma Sowerby I, 1832: synonym of Bivetopsia haemastoma (G. B. Sowerby I, 1832)
- Cancellaria lamellosa Hinds, 1843 : synonym of Scalptia nassa (Gmelin, 1791)
- Cancellaria mangelioides Reeve, 1856: synonym of Scalptia scalariformis (Lamarck, 1822)
- Cancellaria multiplicata Lesson, 1841: synonym of Bivetopsia chrysostoma (G. B. Sowerby I, 1832) (junior homonym of Cancellaria multiplicata Lea, 1833)
- Cancellaria nassiformis Lesson, 1842: synonym of Phrontis nassiformis (Lesson, 1842)
- Cancellaria parva Philippi, 1860 (non Lea, 1833): synonym of Sveltella philippii Cossmann, 1899
- Cancellaria patricia Thiele, 1925: synonym of Microsveltia patricia (Thiele, 1925)
- Cancellaria undulata G.B. Sowerby II, 1849 : synonym of Sydaphera undulata (G.B. Sowerby II, 1849)
