= C. candida =

C. candida may refer to:

- Cancellaria candida, a sea snail species
- Cyclaspis candida, a crustacean species in the genus Cyclaspis

== Synonyms ==
- Carneades candida, a synonym for Euxoa misturata, a moth species found in North America
- Cattleya candida, a synonym for Cattleya loddigesii, an orchid species

== See also ==
- Candida (disambiguation)
