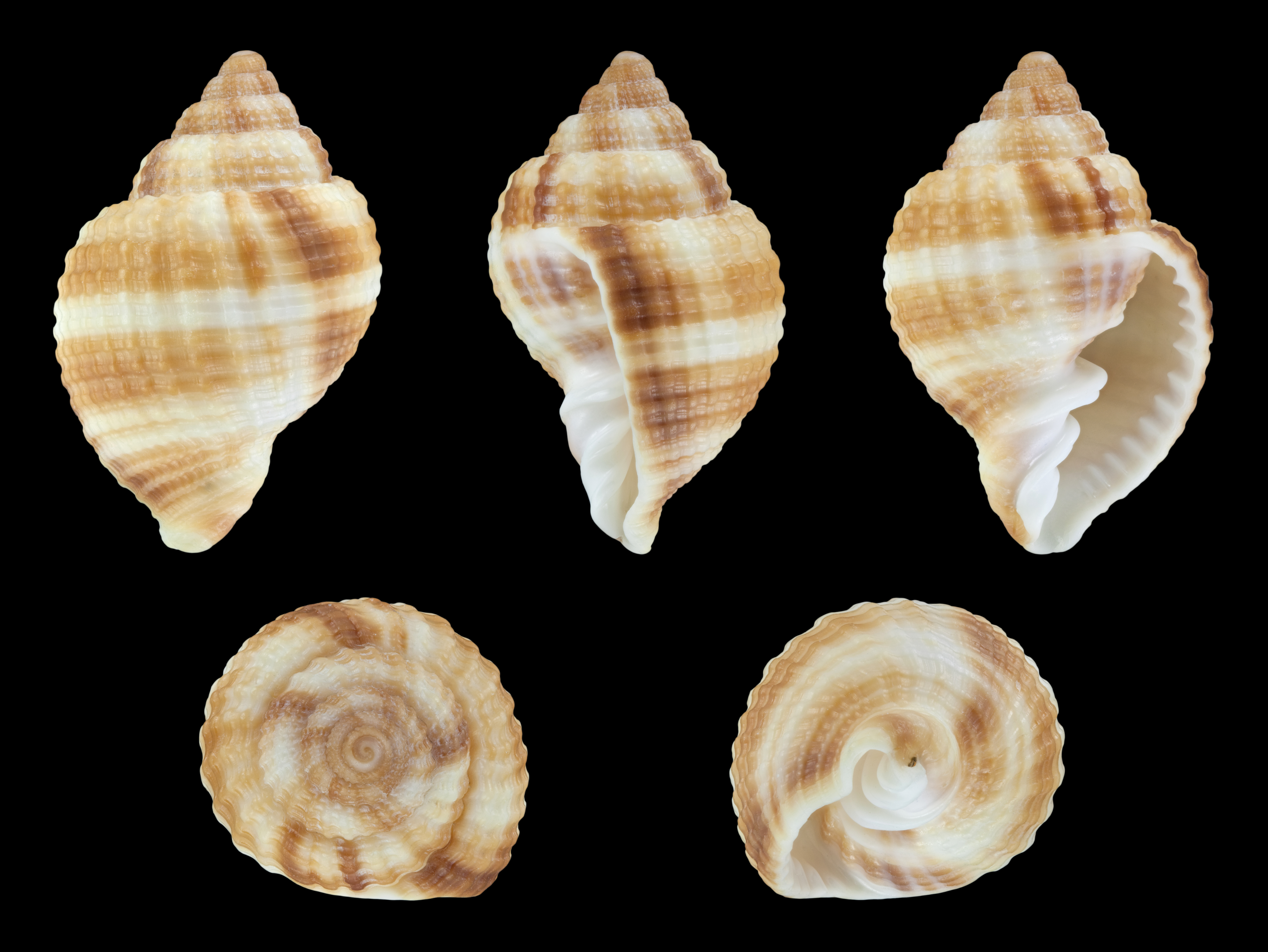
- Five views of a shell of Cancellaria reticulata Linnaeus, 1767

Scientific classification
- Kingdom: Animalia
- Phylum: Mollusca
- Class: Gastropoda
- Subclass: Caenogastropoda
- Order: Neogastropoda
- Family: Cancellariidae
- Genus: Cancellaria
- Species: C. reticulata

Binomial name
- Cancellaria reticulata L.

Synonyms
- Buccinella canulata Perry, 1811; Cancellaria (Cancellaria) reticulata (Linnaeus, 1767); Voluta reticulata Linnaeus, 1767

= Common nutmeg =

Species of gastropod

The common nutmeg, Cancellaria reticulata, is a species of medium-sized to large sea snail, a marine gastropod mollusk in the family Cancellariidae, the nutmeg snails.

== Distribution ==
This species lives in the western Atlantic Ocean from North Carolina to Brazil, in the Caribbean Sea, the Gulf of Mexico and the Lesser Antilles.

== Habitat ==
The common nutmeg lives in offshore waters. The empty shell is occasionally washed onto ocean beaches.

== Life habits ==
This species is probably carnivorous because its radula is ideal for feeding on soft-bodied animals. The life habits of this species are not known, but one species (Cancellaria cooperi) in the same family is an external parasite on rays.

== Shell description ==
The shell of this species grows up to 2.5 inches in length. It has a rough surface with many spiral cords crossing many axial ribs, resulting in a lattice or beaded pattern. The aperture is elongate, with a short canal. The inner margin with two strong, thin spiral ridges running into its aperture (the upper ridge is stronger than the lower ridge).

There is no operculum.

The common nutmeg's coloration is banded or splotched with tints of cream and orange or brown.
