= Unitas (gastropod) =

Scientific classification
- Domain: Eukaryota
- Kingdom: Animalia
- Phylum: Mollusca
- Class: Gastropoda
- Subclass: Caenogastropoda
- Order: Neogastropoda
- Family: Cancellariidae
- Subfamily: Cancellariinae
- Genus: †Unitas; Palmer, 1947

Species
- See text

Synonyms
- Cancellaria (Uxia) Jousseaume, 1887; †Uxia Jousseaume, 1887

Genus of sea snails

Unitas is an extinct genus of sea snails, marine gastropod mollusks in the family Cancellariidae.

== Species ==
The World Register of Marine Species indicates 40 species accepted within Unitas:

- †Unitas aequalis Lozouet, 2019
- †Unitas aliceae Schnetler & Petit, 2006
- †Unitas anderseni Schnetler & Petit, 2006
- †Unitas angulifera (Deshayes, 1864)
- †Unitas aquitanica Lozouet, 2019
- †Unitas arenosa Lozouet, 2019
- †Unitas beui Le Renard, 1994
- †Unitas boutillieri (Cossmann, 1889)
- †Unitas cloezi (Cossmann, 1892)
- †Unitas cossmanni (Morlet, 1888)
- †Unitas costulata (Lamarck, 1803)
- †Unitas crenulata (Deshayes, 1835)
- †Unitas danieli (Morlet, 1885)
- †Unitas decorticata Lozouet, 2019
- †Unitas delecta (Deshayes, 1864)
- †Unitas dentifera (Deshayes, 1864)
- †Unitas diadema (Watelet, 1853)
- †Unitas elongata Traub, 1979
- †Unitas gailleti (Cossmann, 1913)
- †Unitas gradata Lozouet, 2019
- †Unitas granulata (Nyst, 1845)
- †Unitas hypermeces (Cossmann, 1896)
- †Unitas infraeocaenica (Cossmann, 1889)
- †Unitas interrupta (Deshayes, 1864)
- †Unitas multienensis (Morlet, 1885)
- †Unitas nanggulanensis (K. Martin, 1914)
- †Unitas ornata (Deshayes, 1864)
- †Unitas parnensis (Cossmann, 1896)
- †Unitas paulensis Lozouet, 1999
- †Unitas peyreirensis (Peyrot, 1928)
- †Unitas ponsi Lozouet, 2015
- †Unitas puruensis (K. Martin, 1914)
- †Unitas rhabdota (Bayan, 1873)
- †Unitas sanctistephani Lozouet, 2019
- †Unitas separata (Deshayes, 1864)
- †Unitas speciosa (Deshayes, 1864)
- †Unitas spectabilis (Deshayes, 1864)
- †Unitas submitroides (Cossmann & Pissarro, 1905)
- †Unitas substephanensis Lozouet, 2019
- †Unitas suturalis (G. B. Sowerby I, 1822)
