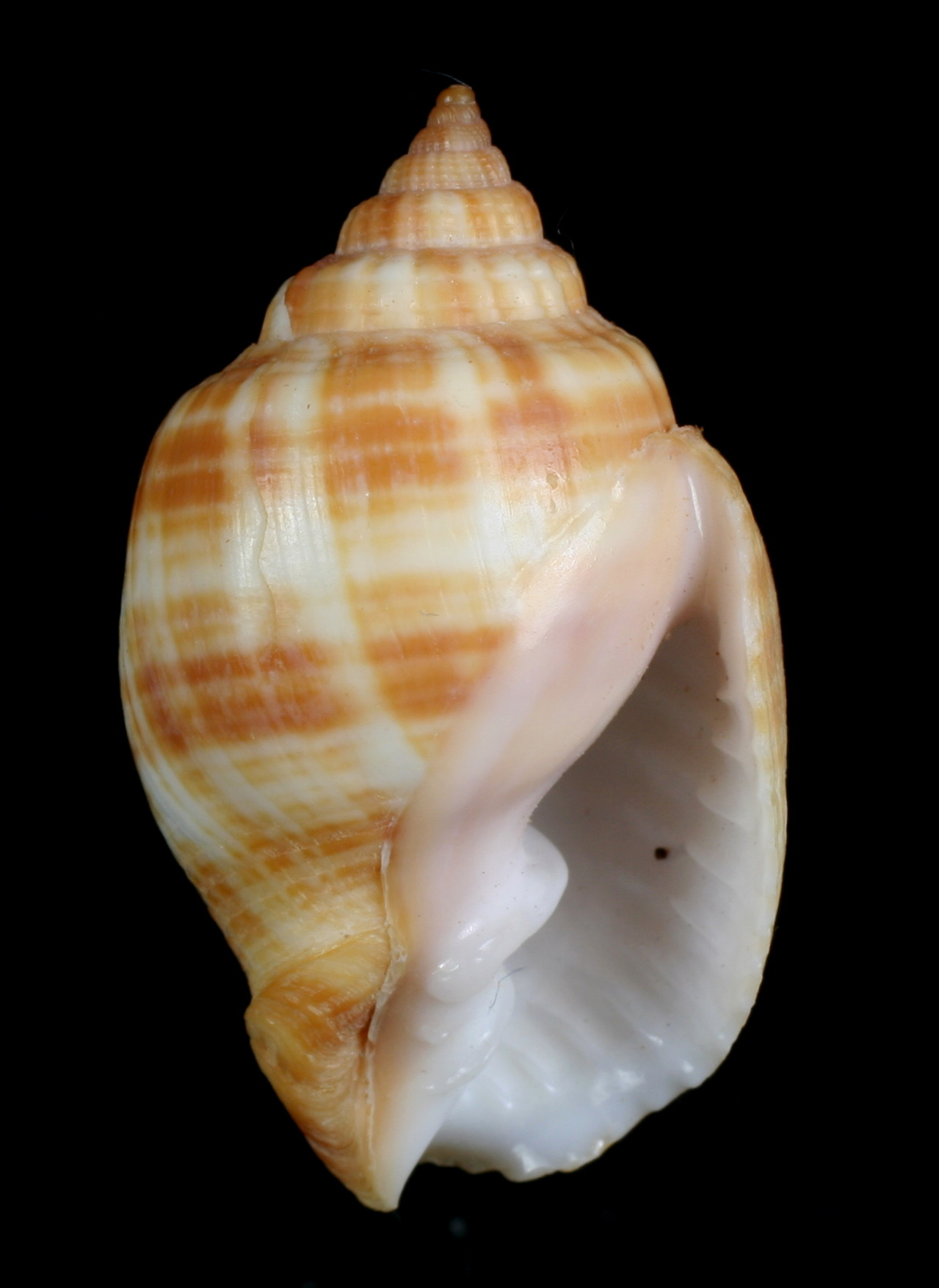
- Apertural view of shell of Cancellaria obesa Sowerby, 1832

Scientific classification
- Kingdom: Animalia
- Phylum: Mollusca
- Class: Gastropoda
- Subclass: Caenogastropoda
- Order: Neogastropoda
- Family: Cancellariidae
- Genus: Cancellaria
- Species: C. obesa

Binomial name
- Cancellaria obesa Sowerby, 1832

Synonyms
- Cancellaria acuminata Sowerby, 1832; Cancellaria eburnaeformis Reeve, 1856

= Cancellaria obesa =

Species of gastropod

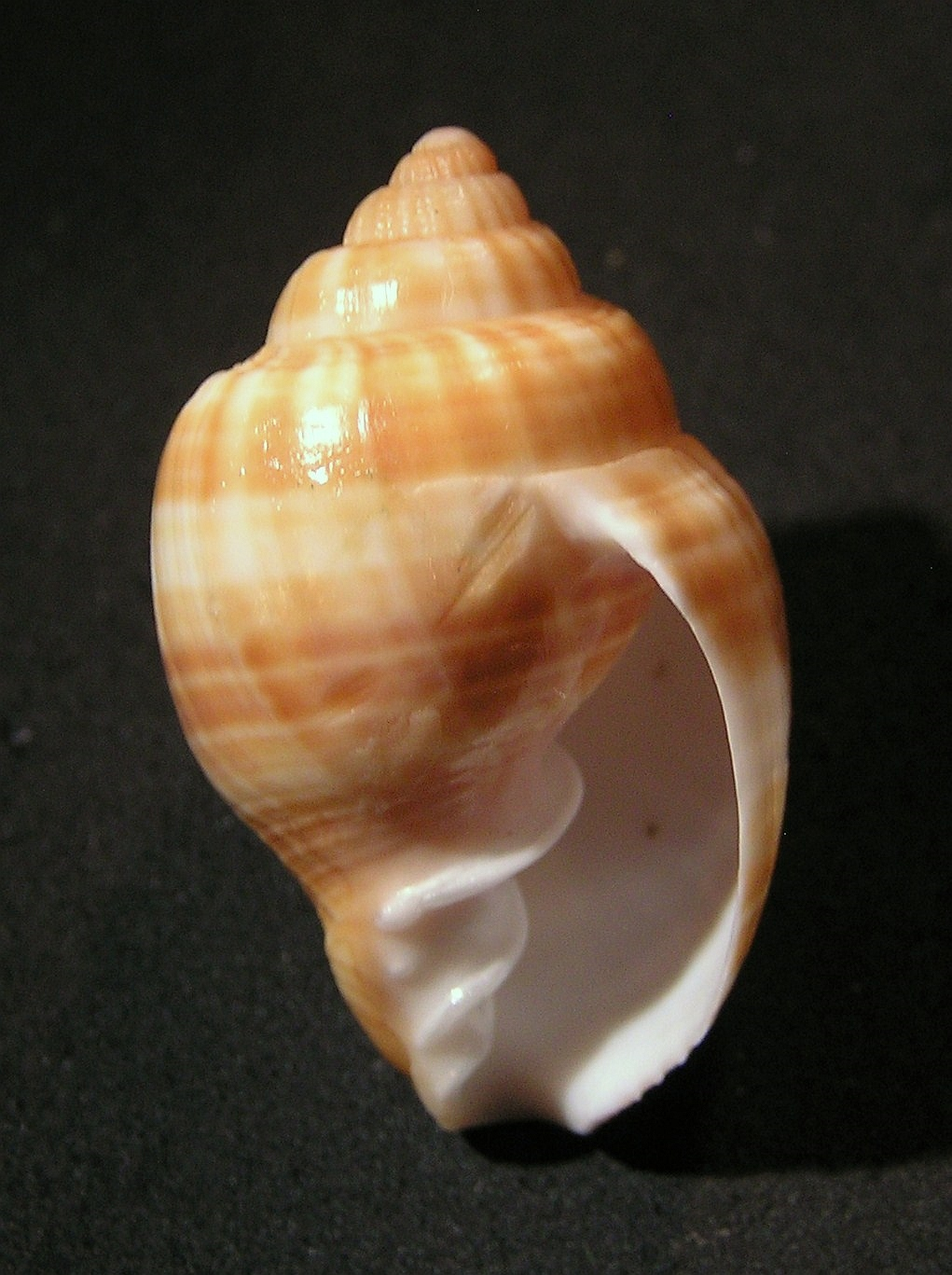
Apertural view of a shell of Cancellaria obesa Sowerby, 1832.

Cancellaria obesa, common name : the obese nutmeg, is a species of sea snail, a marine gastropod mollusk in the family Cancellariidae, the nutmeg snails.

== Description ==
The size of an adult shell varies between 24 mm and 57 mm.

== Distribution ==
This species is distributed in the Pacific Ocean along Baja California, Mexico, Ecuador and Galapagos.
