= Cancellaria fusca =

Scientific classification
- Kingdom: Animalia
- Phylum: Mollusca
- Class: Gastropoda
- Subclass: Caenogastropoda
- Order: Neogastropoda
- Family: Cancellariidae
- Genus: Cancellaria
- Species: C. fusca

Binomial name
- Cancellaria fusca Sowerby, 1889

Synonyms
- Cancellaria fusca var. minor G.B. Sowerby III, 1889

Species of gastropod

Cancellaria fusca is a species of sea snail, a marine gastropod mollusk in the family Cancellariidae, the nutmeg snails.
