= Cancellaria semperiana =

Scientific classification
- Kingdom: Animalia
- Phylum: Mollusca
- Class: Gastropoda
- Subclass: Caenogastropoda
- Order: Neogastropoda
- Family: Cancellariidae
- Genus: Cancellaria
- Species: C. semperiana

Binomial name
- Cancellaria semperiana Crosse, 1863

Species of gastropod

Cancellaria semperiana is a species of sea snail, a marine gastropod mollusk in the family Cancellariidae, the nutmeg snails.
