= Cancellaria crawfordiana =

Scientific classification
- Kingdom: Animalia
- Phylum: Mollusca
- Class: Gastropoda
- Subclass: Caenogastropoda
- Order: Neogastropoda
- Family: Cancellariidae
- Genus: Cancellaria
- Species: C. crawfordiana

Binomial name
- Cancellaria crawfordiana Dall, 1892

Synonyms
- Cancellaria ghiorum Costa, 1993

Species of gastropod

Cancellaria crawfordiana is a species of sea snail, a marine gastropod mollusk in the family Cancellariidae, the nutmeg snails.
