= Cancellaria souverbiei =

Scientific classification
- Kingdom: Animalia
- Phylum: Mollusca
- Class: Gastropoda
- Subclass: Caenogastropoda
- Order: Neogastropoda
- Family: Cancellariidae
- Genus: Cancellaria
- Species: C. souverbiei

Binomial name
- Cancellaria souverbiei Crosse, 1868

Species of gastropod

Cancellaria souverbiei is a species of sea snail, a marine gastropod mollusk in the family Cancellariidae, the nutmeg snails.
