= Cancellaria darwini =

Scientific classification
- Kingdom: Animalia
- Phylum: Mollusca
- Class: Gastropoda
- Subclass: Caenogastropoda
- Order: Neogastropoda
- Family: Cancellariidae
- Genus: Cancellaria
- Species: C. darwini

Binomial name
- Cancellaria darwini Petit, 1970

Species of sea snail

Cancellaria darwini is a species of sea snail, a marine gastropod mollusk in the family Cancellariidae, the nutmeg snails.

== Description ==
This species was discovered in 1970.
