= Cancellaria africana =

Scientific classification
- Kingdom: Animalia
- Phylum: Mollusca
- Class: Gastropoda
- Subclass: Caenogastropoda
- Order: Neogastropoda
- Family: Cancellariidae
- Genus: Cancellaria
- Species: C. africana

Binomial name
- Cancellaria africana Petit, 1970

Synonyms
- Cancellaria imbricata Watson, 1882 (non M. Hörnes, 1854)

Species of gastropod

Cancellaria africana is a species of sea snail, a marine gastropod mollusk in the family Cancellariidae, the nutmeg snails.
