= Cancellaria agalma =

Scientific classification
- Kingdom: Animalia
- Phylum: Mollusca
- Class: Gastropoda
- Subclass: Caenogastropoda
- Order: Neogastropoda
- Family: Cancellariidae
- Genus: Cancellaria
- Species: C. agalma

Binomial name
- Cancellaria agalma Melvill & Standen, 1901

Species of gastropod

Cancellaria agalma is a species of sea snail, a marine gastropod mollusk in the family Cancellariidae, the nutmeg snails.
