= Cancellaria coctilis =

Scientific classification
- Kingdom: Animalia
- Phylum: Mollusca
- Class: Gastropoda
- Subclass: Caenogastropoda
- Order: Neogastropoda
- Family: Cancellariidae
- Genus: Cancellaria
- Species: C. coctilis

Binomial name
- Cancellaria coctilis Reeve, 1856

Species of gastropod

Cancellaria coctilis is a species of sea snail, a marine gastropod mollusk in the family Cancellariidae. Cancellaria coctilis was described by Reeves in 1856.

Cancellaria coctilis has a mineralized skeleton made primarily of calcium carbonate, which mechanizes the snail. This type of snail is found mostly in seafloor environments.
