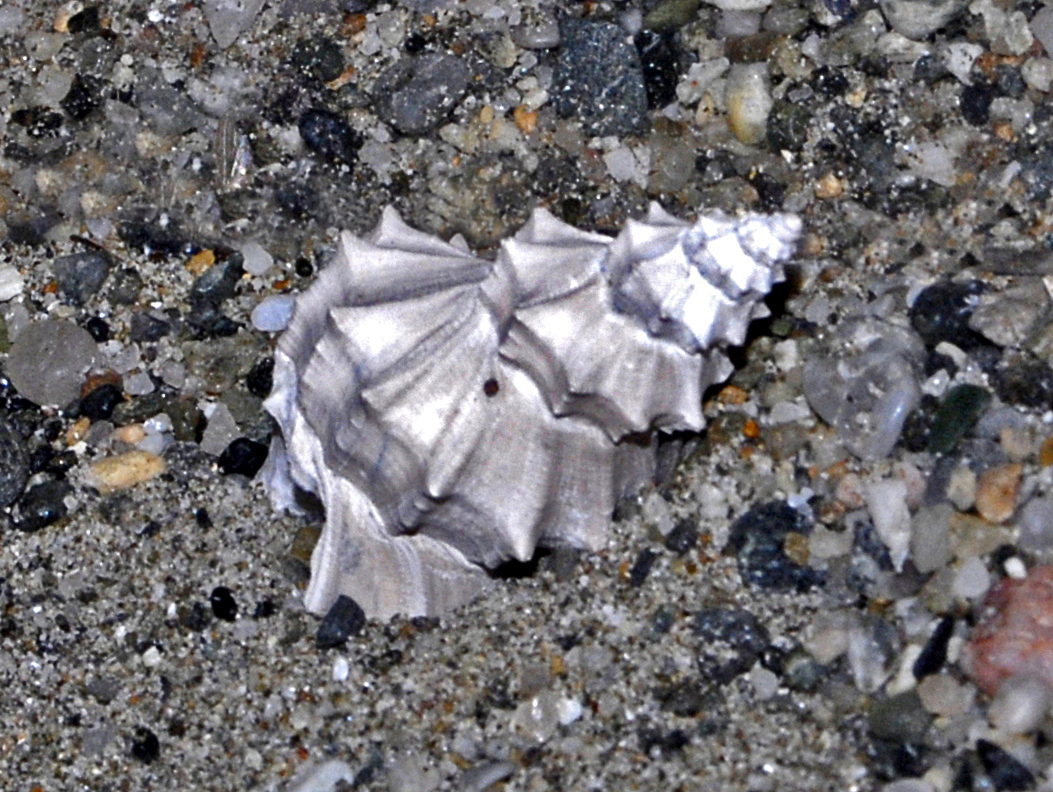
- Shell of Cancellaria lyrata

Scientific classification
- Kingdom: Animalia
- Phylum: Mollusca
- Class: Gastropoda
- Subclass: Caenogastropoda
- Order: Neogastropoda
- Family: Cancellariidae
- Genus: Cancellaria
- Species: C. lyrata

Binomial name
- Cancellaria lyrata A. Adams & Reeve, 1850

= Cancellaria lyrata =

Species of gastropod

Cancellaria lyrata, the lyrate nutmeg, is a species of sea snail, a marine gastropod mollusk in the family Cancellariidae, the nutmeg snails.

== Distribution ==
This species can be found in Cape Verde.

== Bibliography ==
- Rolán E., 2005. Malacological Fauna From The Cape Verde Archipelago. Part 1, Polyplacophora and Gastropoda.
