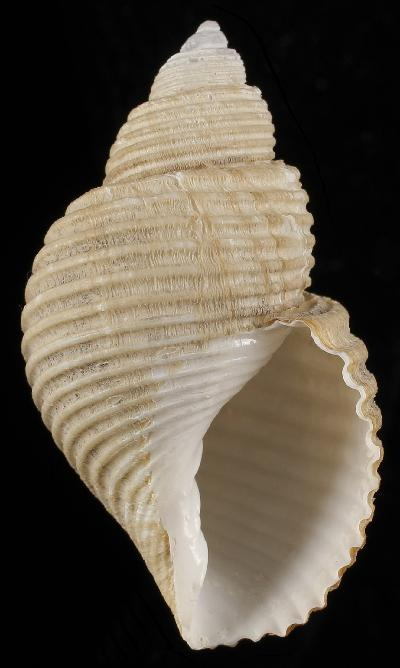
- Shell of Cancellaria rosewateri (specimen at MNHN, Paris)

Scientific classification
- Kingdom: Animalia
- Phylum: Mollusca
- Class: Gastropoda
- Subclass: Caenogastropoda
- Order: Neogastropoda
- Family: Cancellariidae
- Genus: Cancellaria
- Species: C. rosewateri

Binomial name
- Cancellaria rosewateri Petit, 1983

= Cancellaria rosewateri =

Species of gastropod

Cancellaria rosewateri is a species of sea snail, a marine gastropod mollusk in the family Cancellariidae, the nutmeg snails.

== Description ==
The length of the shell attains 30 mm.

== Distribution ==
This species occurs in the Gulf of Mexico off Alabama and Louisiana.
