= Cancellaria plebeja =

Scientific classification
- Kingdom: Animalia
- Phylum: Mollusca
- Class: Gastropoda
- Subclass: Caenogastropoda
- Order: Neogastropoda
- Family: Cancellariidae
- Genus: Cancellaria
- Species: C. plebeja

Binomial name
- Cancellaria plebeja Thiele, 1925

Species of mollusc

Cancellaria plebeja is a species of sea snail, a marine gastropod mollusk in the family Cancellariidae, the nutmeg snails.
