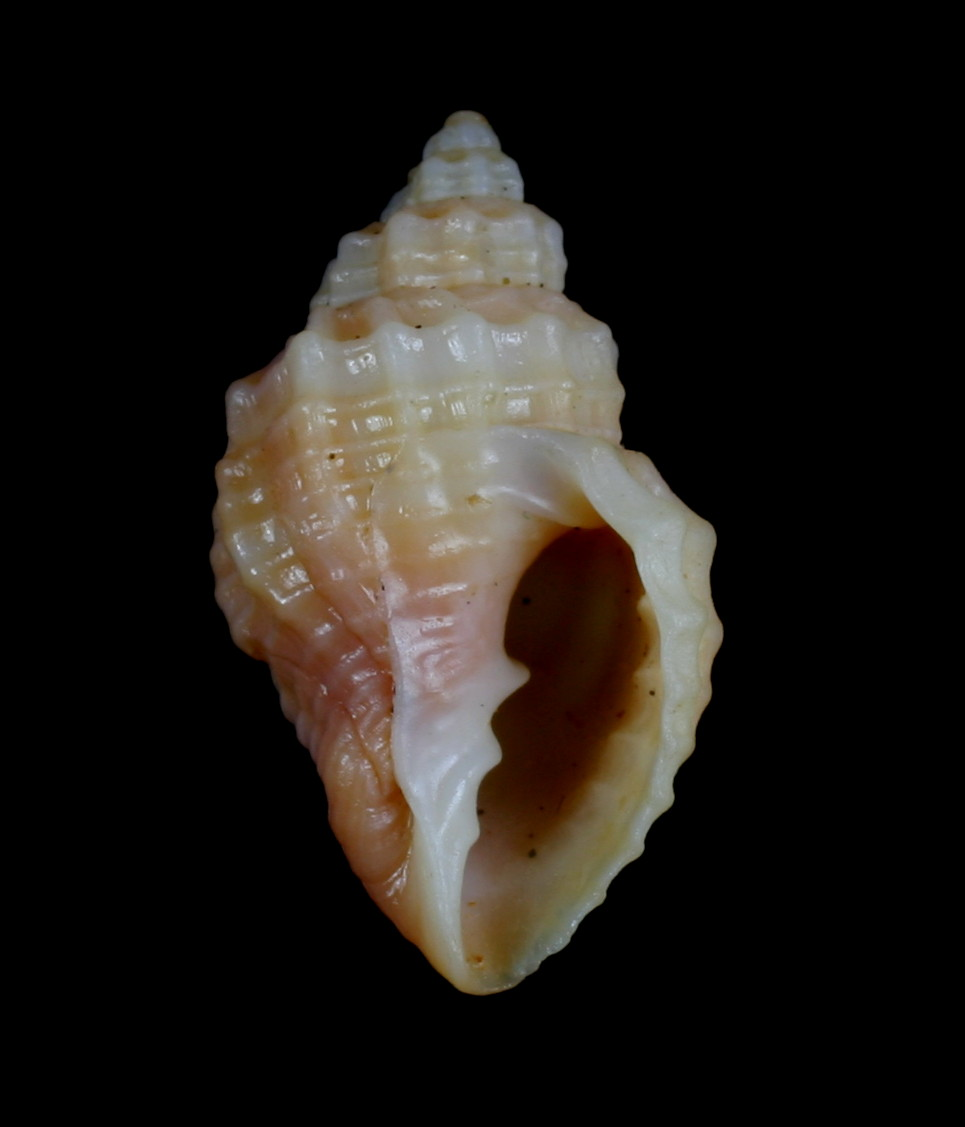
- Apertural view of shell of Cancellaria jayana Keen, 1958

Scientific classification
- Kingdom: Animalia
- Phylum: Mollusca
- Class: Gastropoda
- Subclass: Caenogastropoda
- Order: Neogastropoda
- Family: Cancellariidae
- Genus: Cancellaria
- Species: C. jayana

Binomial name
- Cancellaria jayana Keen, 1958

Synonyms
- Cancellaria clathrata A. Adams, 1855 (non Lamarck, 1822)

= Cancellaria jayana =

Species of gastropod

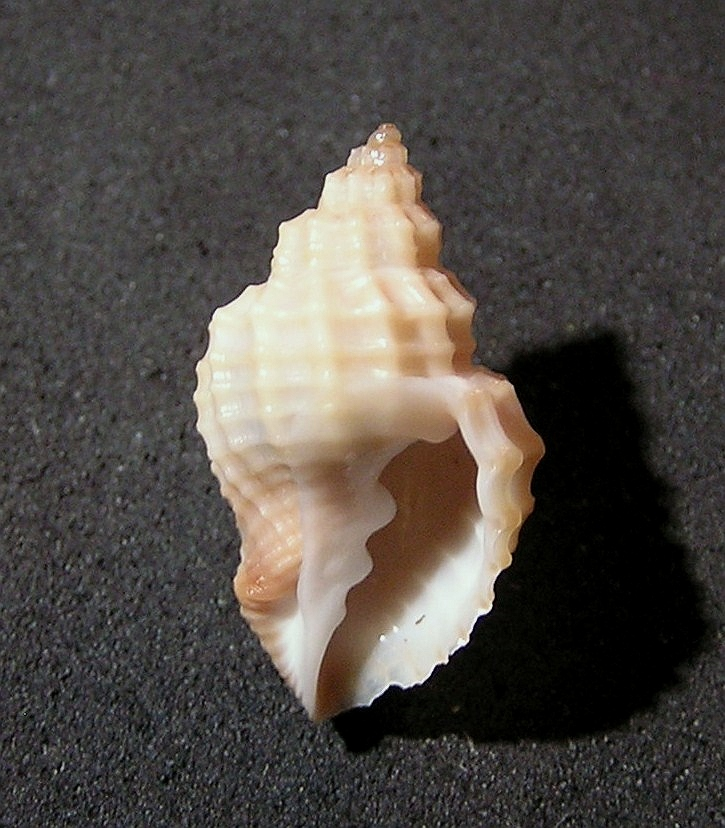
Apertural view of shell of Cancellaria jayana Keen, 1958.

Cancellaria jayana is a species of sea snail, a marine gastropod mollusk in the family Cancellariidae, the nutmeg snails.

== Description ==
The size of an adult shell varies between 18 mm and 25 mm.

== Distribution ==
This species is distributed in the Pacific Ocean along Mexico and Panama.
