= Cancellaria richardpetiti =

Scientific classification
- Kingdom: Animalia
- Phylum: Mollusca
- Class: Gastropoda
- Subclass: Caenogastropoda
- Order: Neogastropoda
- Family: Cancellariidae
- Genus: Cancellaria
- Species: C. richardpetiti

Binomial name
- Cancellaria richardpetiti Petuch, 1987

Species of gastropod

Cancellaria richardpetiti is a species of sea snail, a marine gastropod mollusk in the family Cancellariidae, the nutmeg snails.

== Description ==
Original description: "Shell thin, fragile, composed of 6 whorls; spire protracted, body whorl elongated; body whorl and spire whorls ornamented with longitudinal ribs; 32 ribs on body whorl, running from suture to anterior tip; ribs on spire whorls more prominent, producing varix-like appearance; longitudinal ribs intersected by raised, spiral cords; large bead produced where rib and cord intersect, forming general appearance of longitudinal lines of beads; protoconch very large; aperture narrow; columella with 3 folds, posteriormost being the largest; color white, with 3 wide, uninterrupted bands of orange-brown around body whorl, one along shoulder, one anterior of mid-body, and one around siphonal canal; spire whorls solid orange-brown with thin white band along suture; interior of aperture white; 3-whorled protoconch dark brown; interior of aperture white."

== Distribution ==
Locus typicus: "(Dredged from) 150 metres depth

50 kilometres South of Apalachicola, Florida, USA."
