= Cancellaria thomasiana =

Scientific classification
- Kingdom: Animalia
- Phylum: Mollusca
- Class: Gastropoda
- Subclass: Caenogastropoda
- Order: Neogastropoda
- Family: Cancellariidae
- Genus: Cancellaria
- Species: C. thomasiana

Binomial name
- Cancellaria thomasiana Crosse, 1861

Synonyms
- Cancellaria scalarina G.B. Sowerby II, 1849b

Species of gastropod

Cancellaria thomasiana is a species of sea snail, a marine gastropod mollusk in the family Cancellariidae, the nutmeg snails.
