= Cancellaria corrosa =

Scientific classification
- Kingdom: Animalia
- Phylum: Mollusca
- Class: Gastropoda
- Subclass: Caenogastropoda
- Order: Neogastropoda
- Family: Cancellariidae
- Genus: Cancellaria
- Species: C. corrosa

Binomial name
- Cancellaria corrosa Reeve, 1856

Species of gastropod

Cancellaria corrosa is a species of sea snail, a marine gastropod mollusk in the family Cancellariidae, the nutmeg snails.
