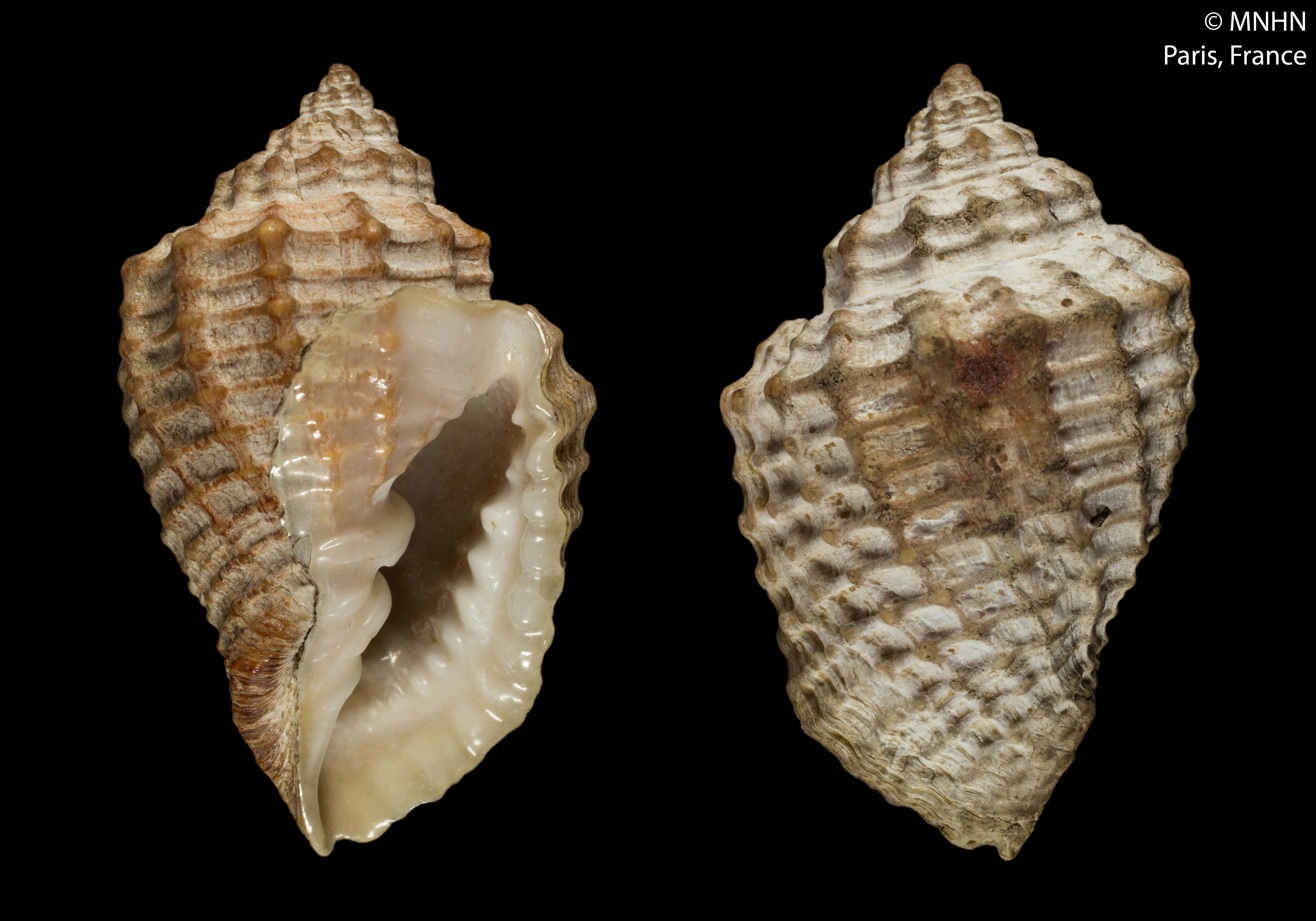
- Shell of Cancellaria indentata (syntype at MNHN, Paris)

Scientific classification
- Kingdom: Animalia
- Phylum: Mollusca
- Class: Gastropoda
- Subclass: Caenogastropoda
- Order: Neogastropoda
- Family: Cancellariidae
- Genus: Cancellaria
- Species: C. indentata

Binomial name
- Cancellaria indentata Sowerby, 1832

Synonyms
- Bivetia mariei Jousseaume, 1887; Cancellaria affinis Reeve, 1856 (non C.B. Adams, 1852)

= Cancellaria indentata =

Species of gastropod

Cancellaria indentata is a species of sea snail, a marine gastropod mollusk in the family Cancellariidae, the nutmeg snails.
