= Cancellaria obtusa =

Scientific classification
- Kingdom: Animalia
- Phylum: Mollusca
- Class: Gastropoda
- Subclass: Caenogastropoda
- Order: Neogastropoda
- Family: Cancellariidae
- Genus: Cancellaria
- Species: C. obtusa

Binomial name
- Cancellaria obtusa Deshayes, 1830

Species of gastropod

Cancellaria obtusa is a species of sea snail, a marine gastropod mollusk in the family Cancellariidae, the nutmeg snails. Its shell size ranges from 30–45mm.
