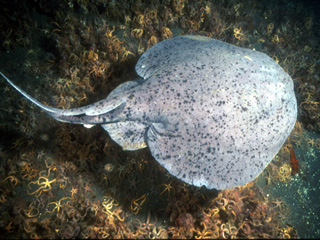

Conservation status
- Least Concern (IUCN 3.1)

Scientific classification
- Kingdom: Animalia
- Phylum: Chordata
- Class: Chondrichthyes
- Subclass: Elasmobranchii
- Order: Torpediniformes
- Family: Torpedinidae
- Genus: Tetronarce
- Species: T. californica

Binomial name
- Tetronarce californica Ayres, 1855
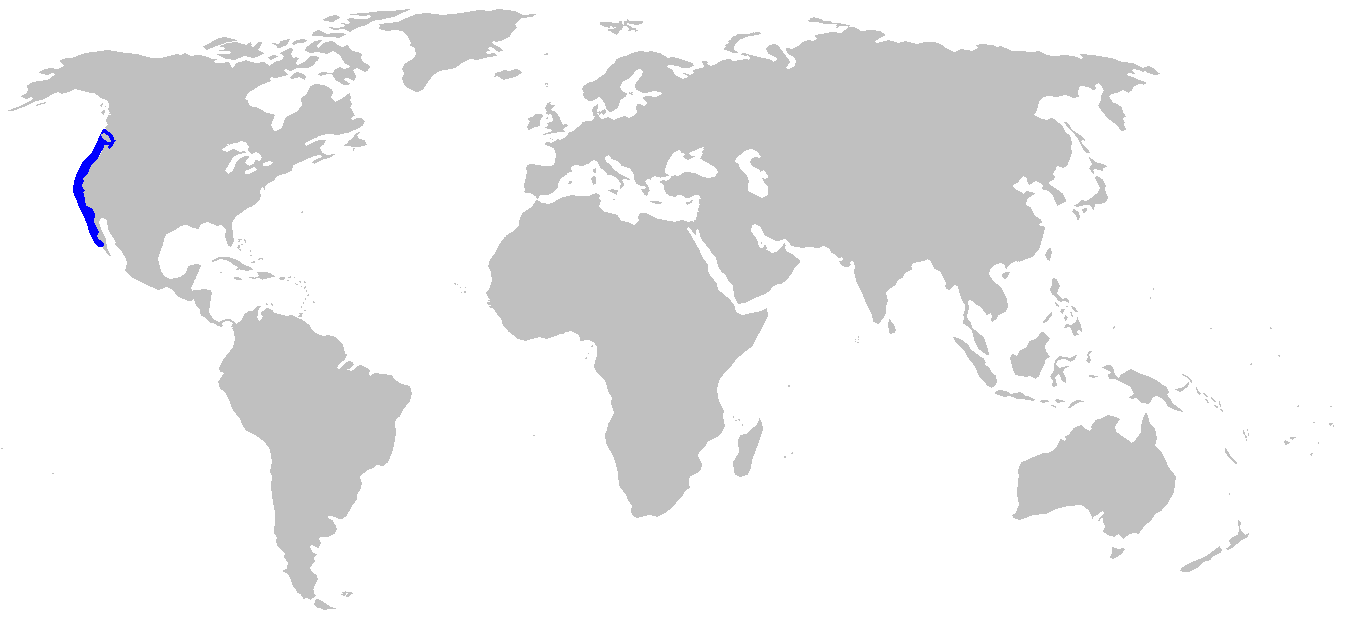
- Range of the Pacific electric ray

Synonyms
- Torpedo californica Ayres, 1855

= Pacific electric ray =

Species of cartilaginous fish

Tetronarce californica also known as the Pacific electric ray is a species of electric ray in the family Torpedinidae, endemic to the coastal waters of the northeastern Pacific Ocean from Baja California to British Columbia. It generally inhabits sandy flats, rocky reefs, and kelp forests from the surface to a depth of 200 m (660 ft), but has also been known to make forays into the open ocean. Measuring up to 1.4 m (4.6 ft) long, this species has smooth-rimmed spiracles (paired respiratory openings behind the eyes) and a dark gray, slate, or brown dorsal coloration, sometimes with dark spots. Its body form is typical of the genus, with a rounded pectoral fin disc wider than long and a thick tail bearing two dorsal fins of unequal size and a well-developed caudal fin.

Solitary and nocturnal, the Pacific electric ray can generate up to 45 volts of electricity for the purposes of subduing prey or self-defense. It feeds mainly on bony fishes, ambushing them from the substrate during the day and actively hunting for them at night. Reproduction is aplacental viviparous, meaning that the embryos are initially nourished by yolk, later supplemented by histotroph ("uterine milk") produced by the mother. Females bear litters of 17–20 pups, probably once every other year. Care should be exercised around the Pacific electric ray, as it has been known to act aggressively if provoked and its electric shock can potentially incapacitate a diver. It and other electric rays are used as model organisms for biomedical research. The International Union for Conservation of Nature (IUCN) has listed this species under Least Concern, as it is not fished in any significant numbers.

== Taxonomy ==
The Pacific electric ray was described by American ichthyologist William Orville Ayres, the first Curator of Ichthyology at the California Academy of Sciences, who named it after the U.S. state where it was first discovered by science. Ayers published his account in 1855, in the inaugural volume of the academy's Proceedings; no type specimens were designated. In 1861, Theodore Gill placed this species in his newly created genus Tetronarce, on the basis of its smooth-rimmed spiracles. Later authors have generally regarded Tetronarce as a subgenus of Torpedo. Closely similar electric rays found off Peru, Chile, and Japan may be the same as this species. Other common names used for this ray include California torpedo ray, Pacific torpedo, or simply electric ray or torpedo ray. This species is placed in the genus Tetronarce.

== Distribution and habitat ==
The only electric ray found off western North America, the Pacific electric ray occurs as far south as Sebastian Vizcaino Bay in Baja California, and as far north as the Dixon Entrance in northern British Columbia. It is most common south of Point Conception, California, with the rays north of the Point perhaps representing one or more separate populations.

Off California, the Pacific electric ray is generally encountered at a depth of 3–30 m (10–100 ft), while off Baja California it is typically observed at a depth of 100–200 m (330–660 ft). It has been reported from as deep as 425 m (1,394 ft). This species prefers temperatures of 10–13 °C (50–55 °F). It frequents sandy flats, rocky reefs, and kelp forests. However, one individual has been videotaped 17 km (11 mi) west of Point Pinos, Monterey County, California, swimming 10 m (33 ft) below the surface in water 3 km (1.9 mi) deep; this and other observations suggest that this species makes periodic excursions away from shallow coastal habitats into the epipelagic zone. Occasional reports of the Pacific electric ray have been noted in northern Japan and the southern Kuril Islands, indicating the possible presence of small populations in the northwestern Pacific region.

The Pacific electric ray is generally common, especially along the California coastline, from Monterey Bay southward to Baja California. It is least abundant in its range's most northernmost and southernmost sections. Its northernmost point, northern British Columbia, has much cooler water temperatures, making the habitat far less adequate than the temperate southern waters it is most commonly found. They have also been sighted in the Gulf of California (the easter side of the Baja California Peninsula), and although the sightings are extremely rare, it infers that they are far less abundant there than on the California and western Baja California coastlines. Although it has fairly stable populations, detailed information on its abundance throughout its entire range is scarce, mainly because the species holds little commercial or charismatic value. Overall, the pacific electric ray's range expands from 3,218 to 4,023 km (2,000 to 2,500 mi) of coastline.

== Description ==
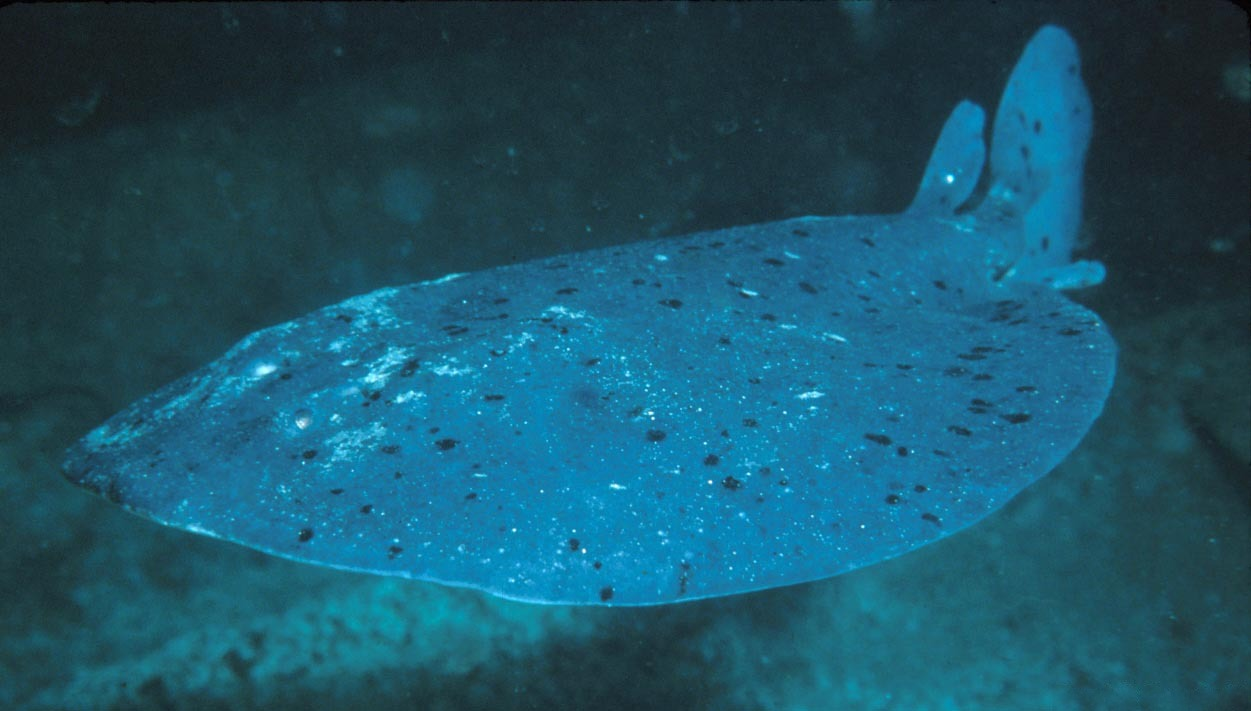
Some Pacific electric rays have dark spots on the upper surface.

The Pacific electric ray has a soft, flabby, limp depressiform body type lacking placoid scales (dermal denticles) typically found on cartilaginous fish. It has an oval pectoral fin disc that is more complicated than most fishes due to the ray's depressiform body style. The size of their pectoral fin disc, in this case, is the width of their entire body. It is about 1.2 times as wide as long, with a nearly straight front margin and a pair of kidney-shaped electric organs visible beneath the skin. The eyes are small and followed by smooth-rimmed spiracles; the space from the spiracles to the snout tip is about 1.8 times the distance between the spiracles.

There is a curtain of skin between the nostrils that almost reaches the mouth, which is arched with deep furrows at the corners. The distance between the mouth and the snout tip is about equal to the mouth width, and three times that of the distance between the nostrils. There are 25–28 upper tooth rows and 19–26 lower tooth rows; each tooth is tiny and smooth, with a single sharp cusp. They use their teeth to manipulate and grip their prey. They are subdued by electric shocks produced by 45 volts of electricity, up to 220 volts, from their kidney-shaped organs with modified muscle tissues arranged in columns containing electrolytes that cause ions to move across a cell membrane, thus creating an electric discharge.

Following their mouth are two pairs of five vertical gill slits that expel water since they respire through their spiracles on their dorsal side. Tasking in water through their dorsal side enables the ray to breathe while submerging in sediment on the ocean floor. Pacific electric rays are founded in Japan, south Kuril Islands, and Kinmei Seamount; Wiah Point, Graham Island, northern British Columbia to Todos Santos, southern Baja California, including Isla Guadalupe, central Baja California, and Peru. Although there was one record from the Gulf of California. Common from about San Francisco Bay southward into southern Baja California. Pacific electric rays can grow up to a length more than 140 cm (55 in), and 18–23 cm (7.1–9.1 in) at birth. Pacific electric rays are able to swim to a depth from the surf zone to 1,079 m (3,540 ft), usually shallower than 300 m (980 ft).

Two dorsal fins are present, with the first more than twice the size of the second Their first dorsal fin is 5.3–11.2 cm (2.1–4.4 in) long, nearly double the size of their second dorsal fin, 3.0–6.7 cm (1.2–2.6 in); both dorsal fins are found far on the posterior end of the ray. Their dorsal fins help stabilize the fish against rolling and assist with maneuverability, and they are positioned nearly at the base of the pelvic fin. In contrast, the second dorsal fin is found behind the pelvic fin, displaying a thoracic pelvic fin placement and positioned opposite the large pelvic fins. They have paired pelvic fins consisting of 5 soft rays with broad, round margins, as of now, there are no specific measurements of their pelvic fins they are noted for their comparatively large size and aid in stability during swimming and resting. Following their dorsal fin is their short, stocky caudal peduncle (tail) ranging from 24.0–39.3 cm (9.4–15.5 in) in length, with a nearly straight trailing margin. Their cloaca is located at the base of their tail, which is used for defecation, urination, and reproduction. Connecting their caudal (tail) fin, whose measurements are not specifically provided, but its overall description is that their caudal fin is large with a triangular or truncated shape. Their caudal peduncle and caudal fin are used for propulsion, allowing them to produce powerful, quick movements through the water while hunting for prey or when they need to move quickly through the water. This ray is dark gray, slate, or brown above, sometimes with small darker spots that increase in number with age; however, all have a pale or white ventral side. Pacific electric ray females are larger than their male counterparts, measuring 164 cm (65 in) in width (their pectoral disc) and a total of 137 cm (54 in) in length. Male Pacific electric rays are 92 cm (36 in) in width and 110 cm (43 in) in length. Both sex's pectoral fin disc width is roughly 1.2 greater than their length. The maximum recorded weight is 41 kg (90 lb). They have paired pelvic fins consisting of 5 soft rays with broad, round margins. As of now, there are no specific measurements of their pelvic fins. They are noted for their comparatively large size and aid in stability during swimming and resting. Finally, male Pacific electric rays have claspers, which are paired modified pelvic fins used for reproduction purposes.

The Pacific electric ray gets confused with other rays due to its similar body plan, behavior, and ability to produce electricity. These species include the Marbled electric ray (Torpedo marmorata), lesser electric ray (Narcine brasiliensis), and the spotted electric ray (Torpedo macneilli). However, they differ geologically. The marbled electric ray is located in the Atlantic Ocean and the Mediterranean Sea, the lesser electric ray is smaller and located in the western Atlantic Ocean, and the spotted electric ray occurs in regions of the Indo-Pacific. This contrasts with the Pacific electric ray, located predominantly in the northeastern Pacific Ocean.

== Biology and ecology ==
With a sizable oily liver and low-density tissues, the Pacific electric ray is almost neutrally buoyant and can hover in the water column with very little effort. Propulsive power is provided by the muscular tail, while the disc is held rigid. Telemetry studies have shown that this species swims primarily at night, when it enters reefs and other habitats with high terrain relief, and spends most of the day in nearby open areas buried in sediment. It is nomadic and solitary, though several individuals may rest within the same area.

Like other members of its family, the Pacific electric ray produces powerful electric shocks for attack and defense. Its paired electric organs are derived from muscle and comprise approximately 15% of its total weight, consisting of many thousands of jelly-filled "electric plates" stacked hundreds-high into vertical hexagonal columns. These columns function essentially like batteries connected in parallel; a large adult ray can generate some 45 volts of electricity with a power output of one kilowatt, due to low internal resistance. The Pacific electric ray produces two types of electrical pulses: steady "warning pulses" when chased and quick, intense bursts to incapacitate their prey. The electric organs discharge direct current in pulses, each lasting 4–5 ms. When attacking prey, in the first few moments the ray normally produces pulses at a rate of 150–200 per second, slowing down over time. Over a thousand pulses may be produced in all, depending on how long it takes for the prey to be subdued. The pulse rate increases with water temperature.

Because of its large size and formidable defenses, The Pacific electric ray seldom falls prey to other animals. There is a record of one being fed upon by a killer whale (Orcinus orca) off Santa Catalina Island. The Cooper's nutmeg (Cancellaria cooperi) is a specialized parasite of this ray, and possibly other bottom-dwelling fishes such as the Pacific angelshark (Squatina californica). The snail is attracted to the chemicals contained in the ray's surface mucus; it makes a small cut on the ventral surface of the ray and uses its proboscis to suck blood. Other known parasites of this species include the copepod Trebius latifurcatus, the fluke Amphibdelloides maccallumi, and the tapeworm Acanthobothrium hispidum.

=== Feeding ===
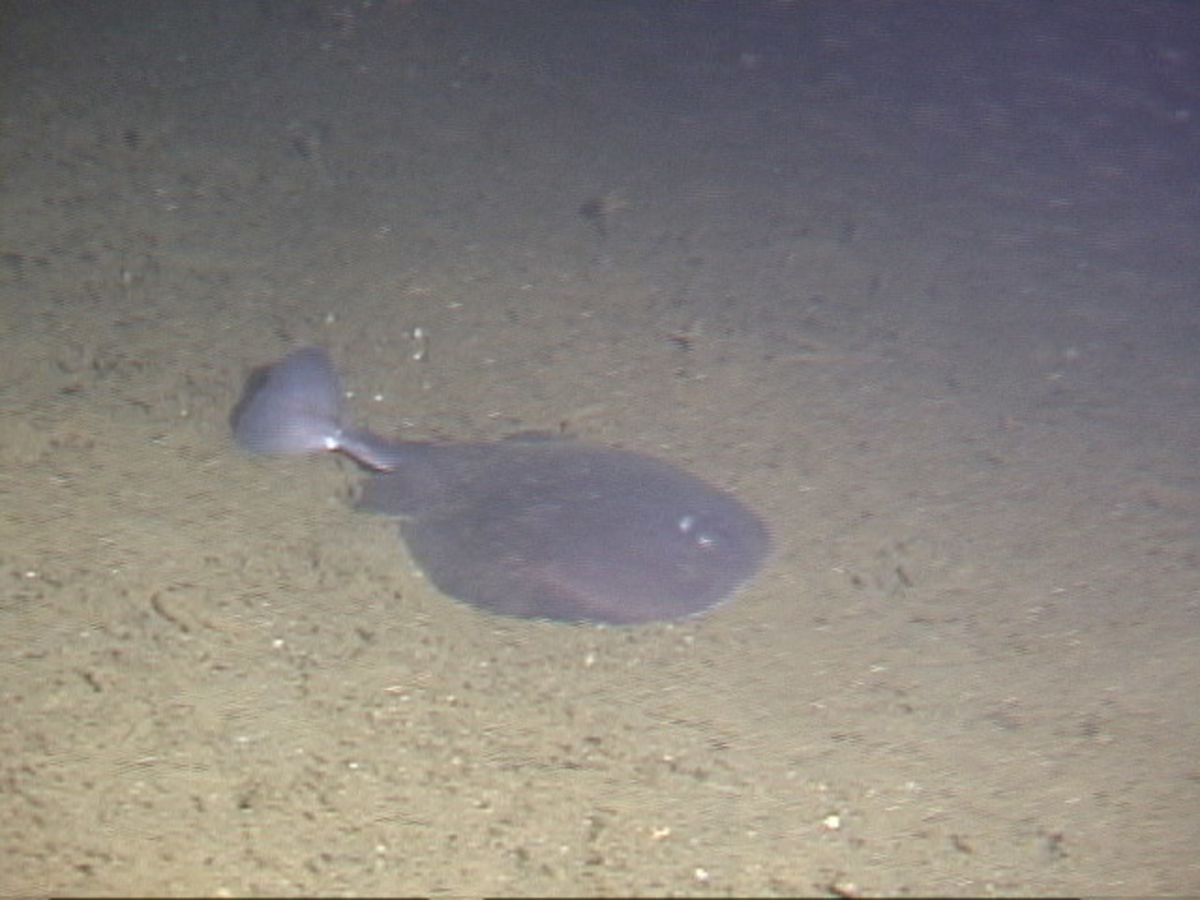
At night, the Pacific electric ray actively hunts for food over the sea floor.

The Pacific electric ray feeds mainly on bony fishes, including anchovies, herring, hake, mackerel, croakers, rockfishes, surfperches, kelp bass, and flatfishes, but will also take cephalopods and invertebrates given the opportunity. Its jaws are highly distensible, allowing it to swallow surprisingly large prey: one female 1.2 m (3.9 ft) long has been observed ingesting a silver salmon (Oncorhynchus kisutch) nearly half her length. During the day, the Pacific electric ray is an ambush predator: when a fish approaches its head, the ray "jumps" forward from its resting place and folds down its disc to envelop it, while delivering strong shocks. Once the fish is subdued, the ray repositions itself to swallow it head-first. The entire process takes about two minutes.

At night, when many diurnal fishes descend from the water column and become inactive a short distance above the bottom, the Pacific electric ray switches to an active hunting strategy. It stalks fish by slowly swimming or simply drifting through the water; when it closes to 5 cm (2.0 in) of the prey, it lunges forward and again envelops the prey within its disc while delivering shocks. To better secure the fish within its disc, the ray will make short kicks with its tail that sometimes send it into barrel rolls or somersaults. Finally, the stunned prey is maneuvered to the mouth with ripples of the disc. In one recorded case, a 75 cm (30 in) long female captured and consumed a 20 cm (7.9 in) long jack mackerel (Trachurus symmetricus) in under ten seconds. Nighttime seine net sampling at the surface of Monterey Bay has captured Pacific electric rays in surprising numbers, suggesting that they rise upward from the bottom to feed on small fishes.

Though the Pacific electric ray will feed at any hour, it responds to prey much more quickly at night than during the day. Most prey captures occur in darkness or turbid conditions, when its eyes are largely useless. Instead, it relies on electroreception via its ampullae of Lorenzini to locate food. Experiments in the field have shown that it will attack artificially generated electric fields and conductive metal electrodes. Mechanical sensory cues, detected via the lateral line, also play an important role: this species has been observed preferentially attacking faster-moving prey even if a closer food item was available.

=== Life history ===
The Pacific electric ray exhibits aplacental viviparity, meaning that the female retains in utero the encapsulated embryo, which completes development and hatches within the parent, with the developing embryos at first receiving nourishment from yolk, and later from histotroph ("uterine milk", enriched with proteins, fat, and mucus) produced by the mother and delivered through specialized outgrowths of the uterine lining. Female Pacific electric rays undergo fertilization via the male copulatory organs, known as claspers, which are used for internal fertilization. The claspers have a tube-shaped structure with a ventral groove called the hypostyle, where sperm will flow into the female's cloaca. Mature females have two functional ovaries and uteruses. Reproduction occurs year-round, with males apparently capable of mating every year and females every other year. The gestation period is unknown. Reported litter sizes range from 17 to 20; at least the number of ova, and perhaps also the number of young, increases with the size of the female.

The newborns measure 18–23 cm (7.1–9.1 in) long and double their size in the first year of life, adding around 25 cm (9.8 in) to their length. Male grow faster than females but reach a smaller ultimate size, known as the von Bertalanffy growth model. Sexual maturity is attained at a length of 65 cm (26 in) and age of seven years for males, and a length of 73 cm (29 in) and age of nine years for females. The oldest documented individuals are 16 years of age, and extrapolating from growth curves the maximum lifespan of this species may be upwards of 24 years for females. In contrast, males have a shorter lifespan, usually living up to around 13 years.[23] Estimating the age of Pacific electric rays is difficult because their vertebrae are delicate, thin, and not well-calcified. Despite these issues, techniques like graphite microtopography have been used to estimate their age, though confirming these estimates is still a challenge.

== Human interactions ==
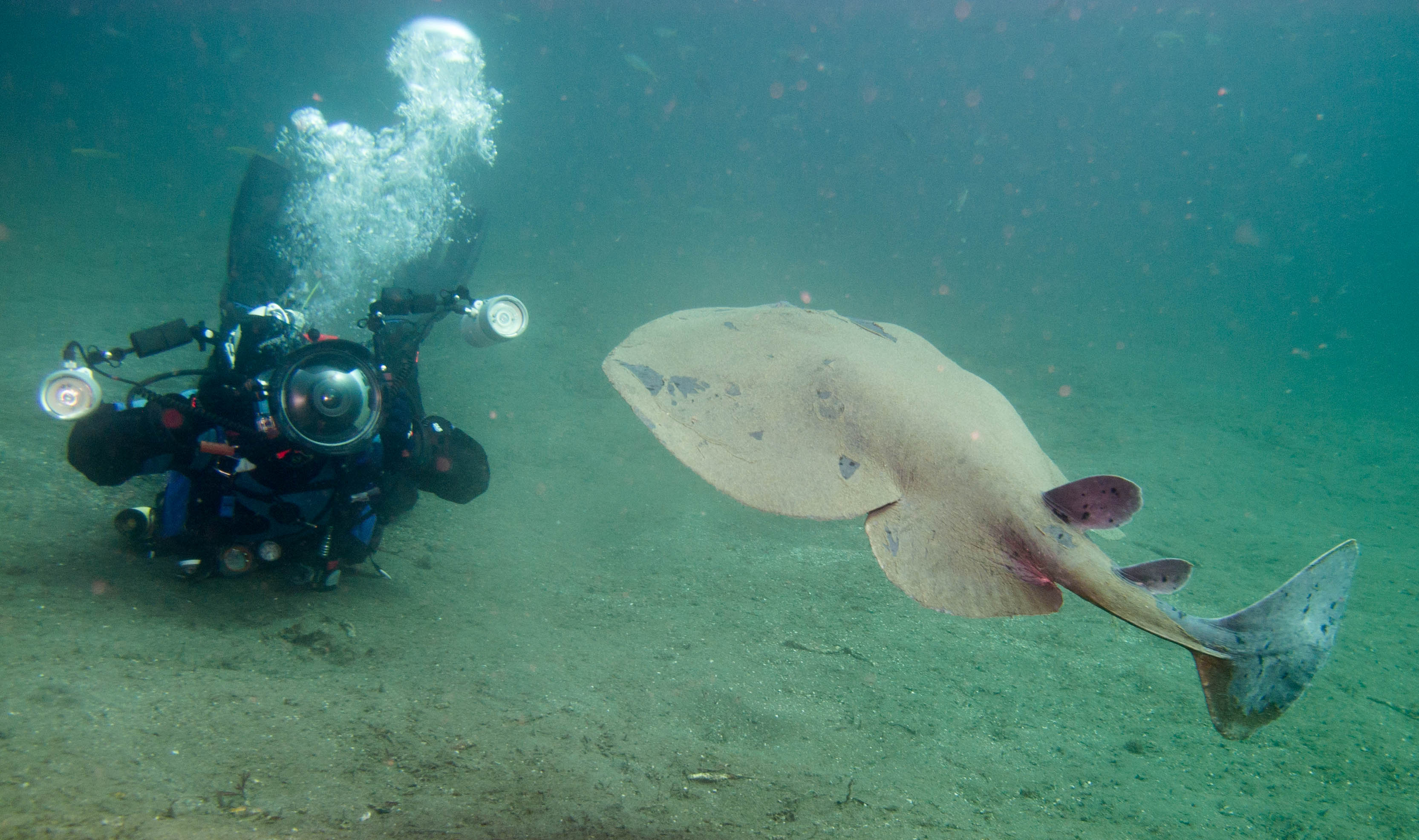
Pacific Electric Ray with diver, offshore Anacapa Island

The shock generated by the Pacific electric ray can be enough to knock down an adult human. It should be treated with caution, especially at night when it is active, and has been known to charge at divers with its mouth agape if harassed. It is not known to be responsible for any fatalities, but may have been involved in several unexplained, fatal diving accidents. This species fares poorly in captivity, as it usually refuses to feed when first introduced into an aquarium. Since 2000, the Aquarium of the Bay and the Monterey Bay Aquarium have had some success keeping Pacific electric rays by offering them moving food.

The Pacific electric ray and its relatives are used as model organisms for biomedical research, because their electric organs contain an abundance of important nervous system proteins such as nicotinic acetylcholine receptor and acetylcholinesterase. In the 1970s and 1980s, acetylcholine receptors from this species and the marbled electric ray (T. marmorata) became the first neurotransmitter receptors to be isolated and sequenced, in what is considered to be a landmark success in the field of neurobiology. This led to a number of further advances, one of the most significant being the elucidation of the pathophysiology underlying the disease myasthenia gravis. A small commercial fishery in southern California supplies Pacific electric rays for research purposes; as of 2005 this fishery may have employed as few as two fishers. Otherwise, this ray has no economic value. Although not specifically targeted by fisheries, It is caught incidentally by commercial trawl and gillnet fisheries, and on hook-and-line by sport anglers. These activities appear to have little impact on its population, leading it to be listed under Least Concern by the International Union for Conservation of Nature (IUCN), showing that its population is also currently facing no major threats that may negatively affect its numbers. However, the threats this species faces are bycatch in fisheries, habitat degradation, climate change, and human disturbance. Their preferred habitats, kelp forests, and rocky reefs, are being degraded, polluted, and destroyed, which presents a potential challenge to this species. Various actions like dredging, coastal construction, and polluting of northwestern coastal waters could reduce the quality of its habitat, especially in shallow waters. The warming of our oceans due to climate change is causing a shift in species ranges, and altercations to our marine ecosystems could affect their distribution. Shifts in water temperature could affect its habitat range or prey availability, though the exact impacts are not yet fully understood. Fishing for this ray is not managed by the Pacific Fishery Management Council.
