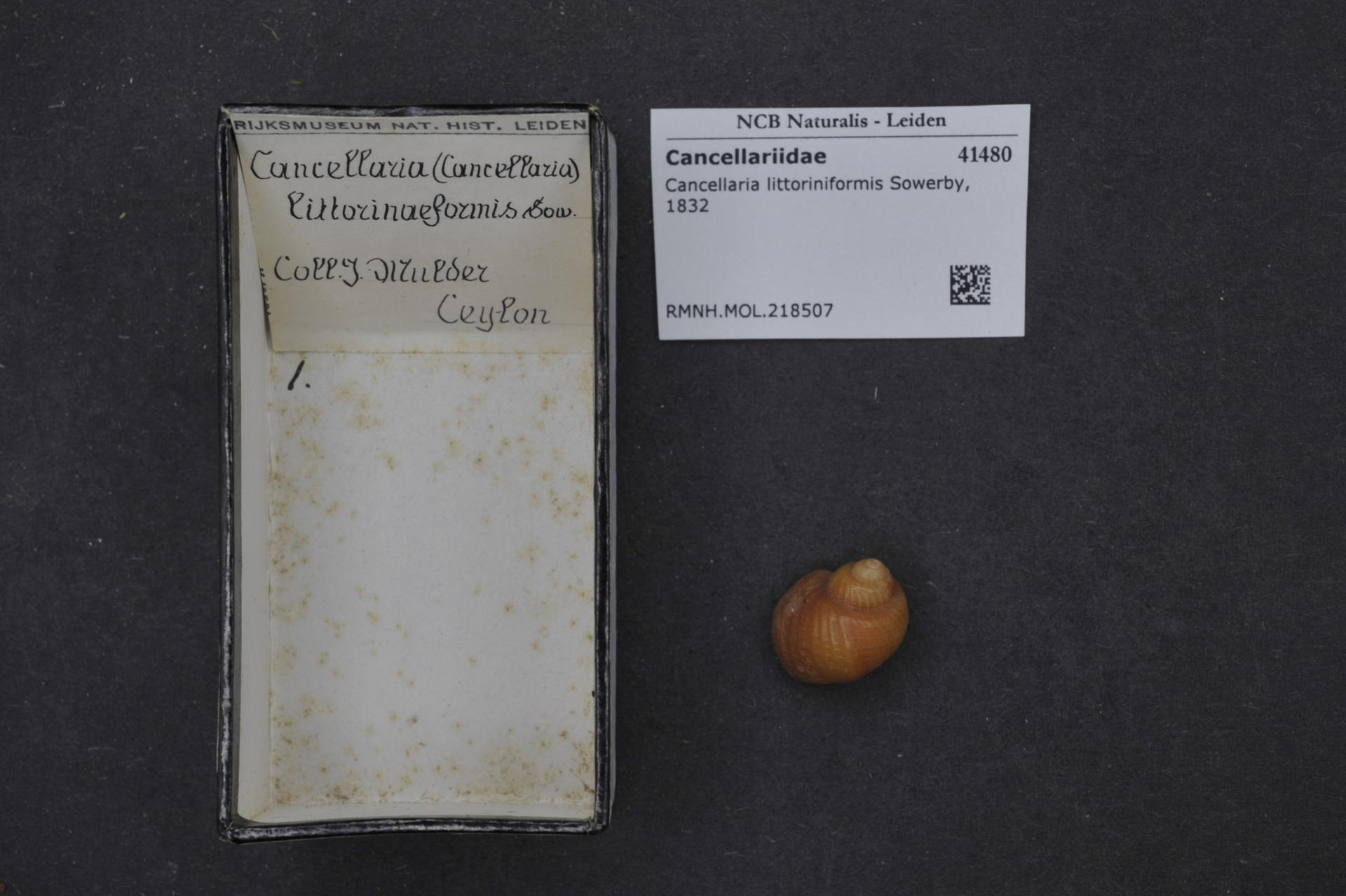

Scientific classification
- Kingdom: Animalia
- Phylum: Mollusca
- Class: Gastropoda
- Subclass: Caenogastropoda
- Order: Neogastropoda
- Family: Cancellariidae
- Genus: Cancellaria
- Species: C. littoriniformis

Binomial name
- Cancellaria littoriniformis Sowerby, 1832

= Cancellaria littoriniformis =

Species of gastropod

Cancellaria littoriniformis is a species of sea snail, a marine gastropod mollusk in the family Cancellariidae, the nutmeg snails.
