= Unitas crenulata =

Scientific classification
- Kingdom: Animalia
- Phylum: Mollusca
- Class: Gastropoda
- Subclass: Caenogastropoda
- Order: Neogastropoda
- Family: Cancellariidae
- Genus: †Unitas
- Species: †U. crenulata

Binomial name
- †Unitas crenulata (Deshayes, 1835)

Synonyms
- †Cancellaria crenulata Deshayes, 1835

Species of gastropod

Unitas crenulata is an extinct species of sea snail, a marine gastropod mollusk in the family Cancellariidae, the nutmeg snails. Fossil examples have been found in France.
