= Sveltella philippii =

Scientific classification
- Kingdom: Animalia
- Phylum: Mollusca
- Class: Gastropoda
- Subclass: Caenogastropoda
- Order: Neogastropoda
- Family: Cancellariidae
- Genus: Sveltella
- Species: S. philippii

Binomial name
- Sveltella philippii Cossmann, 1899

Synonyms
- Cancellaria parva Philippi, 1860 (non Lea, 1833)

Species of gastropod

Sveltella philippii is a species of sea snail, a marine gastropod mollusk in the family Cancellariidae, the nutmeg snails.

This is a replacement name for Cancellaria parva Philippi, 1860, non Lea, 1833
