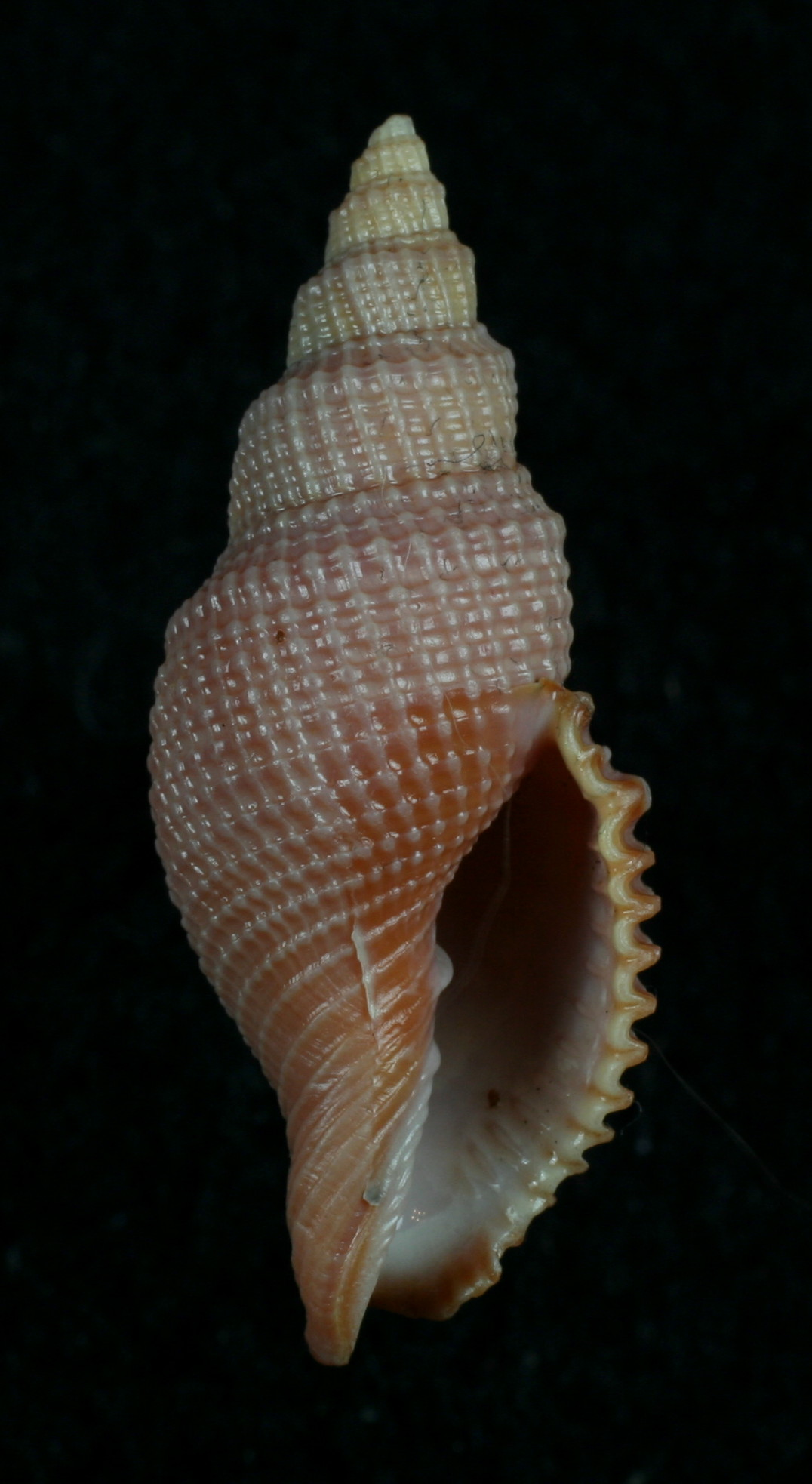
- Apertural view of shell of Hertleinia mitraformis (Sowerby, 1832)

Scientific classification
- Kingdom: Animalia
- Phylum: Mollusca
- Class: Gastropoda
- Subclass: Caenogastropoda
- Order: Neogastropoda
- Family: Cancellariidae
- Genus: Hertleinia; Marks, 1949

= Hertleinia =

Genus of gastropods

Hertleinia is a genus of sea snails, marine gastropod mollusks in the family Cancellariidae, the nutmeg snails.

== Species ==
Species within the genus Hertleinia include:

- Hertleinia mitraformis (G.B. Sowerby I, 1832)
