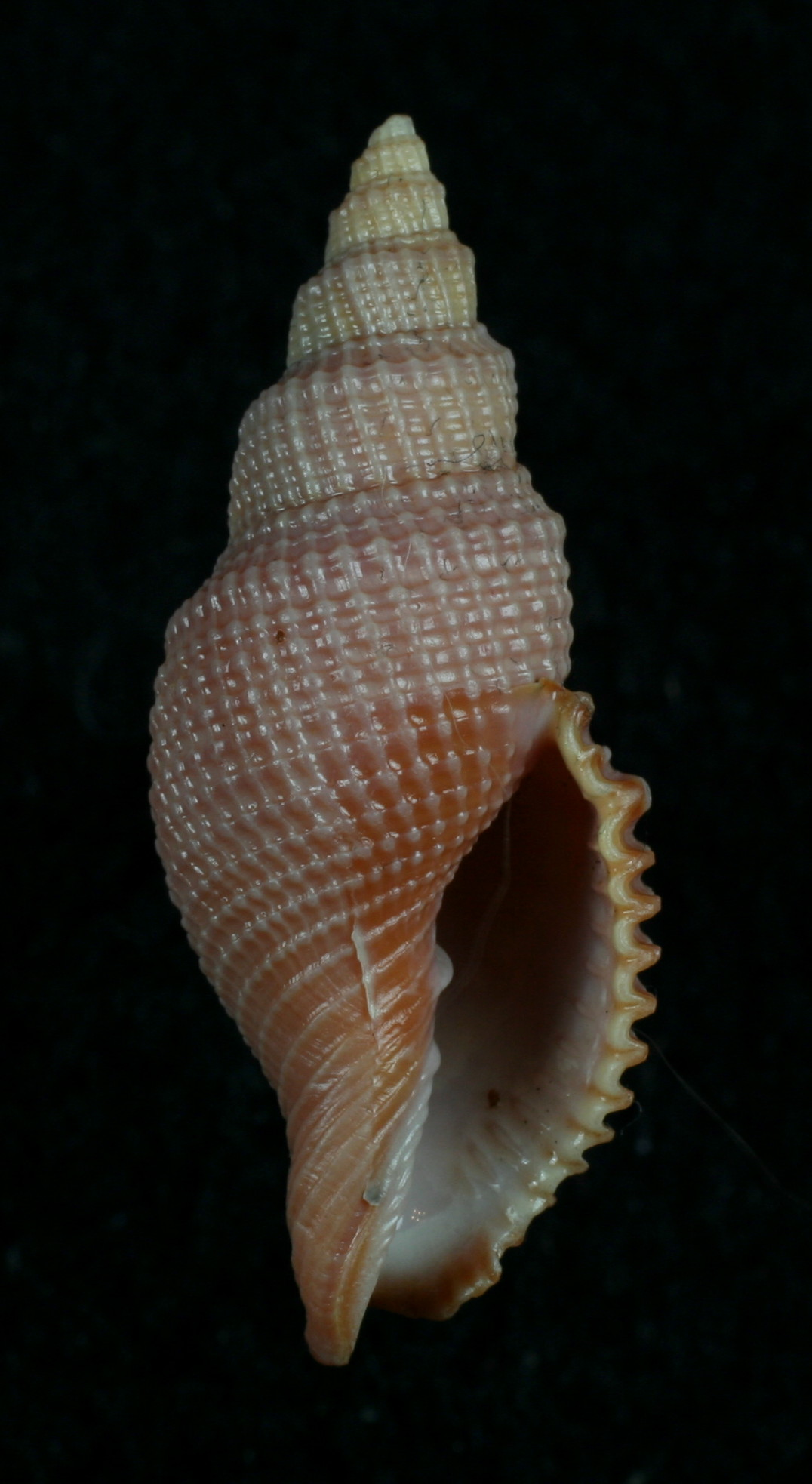
- Apertural view of shell of Hertleinia mitraformis (G.B. Sowerby I, 1832)

Scientific classification
- Kingdom: Animalia
- Phylum: Mollusca
- Class: Gastropoda
- Subclass: Caenogastropoda
- Order: Neogastropoda
- Family: Cancellariidae
- Genus: Hertleinia
- Species: H. mitriformis

Binomial name
- Hertleinia mitriformis (G.B. Sowerby I, 1832)

= Hertleinia mitriformis =

Species of gastropod

Hertleinia mitriformis is a species of sea snail, a marine gastropod mollusk in the family Cancellariidae, the nutmeg snails.
