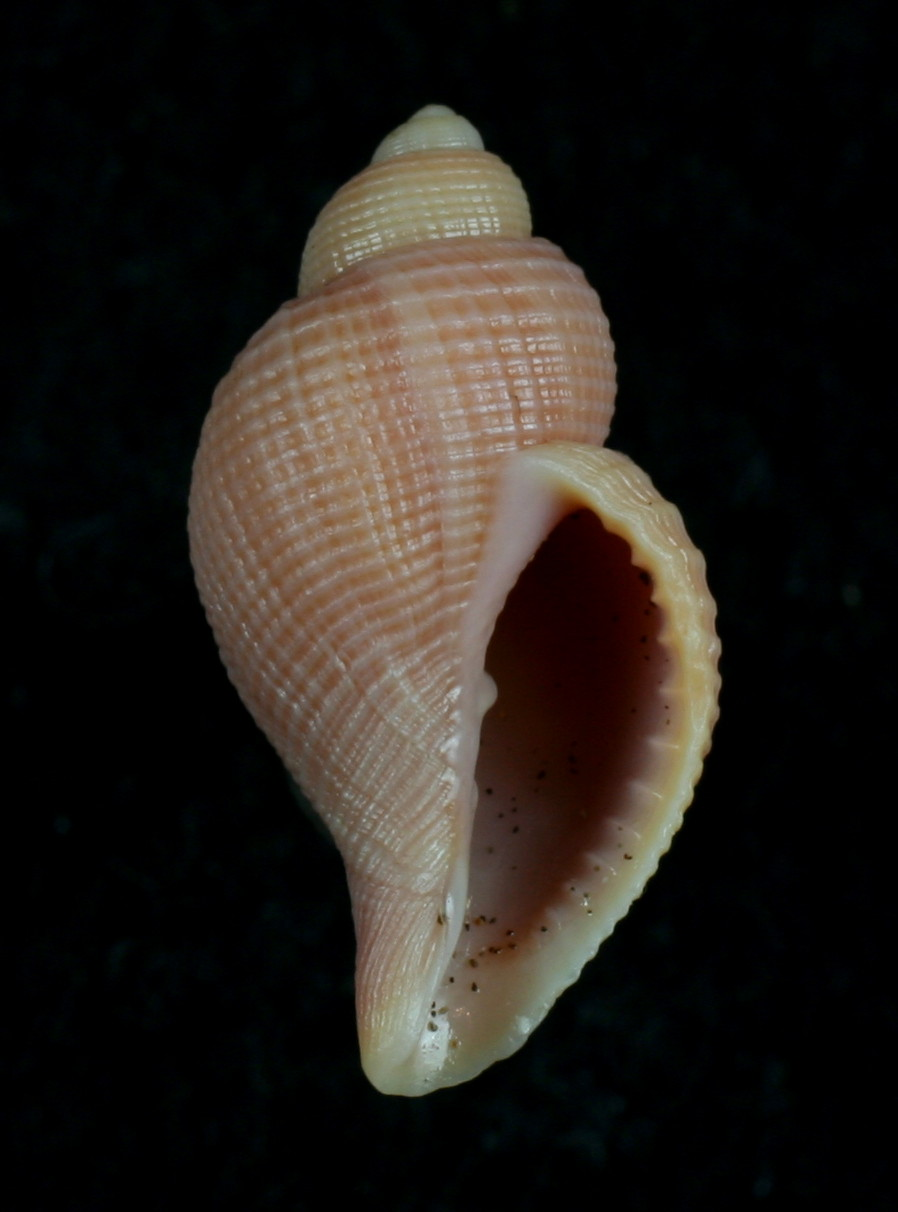
- Apertural view of shell of Massyla corrugata (Hinds, 1843)

Scientific classification
- Kingdom: Animalia
- Phylum: Mollusca
- Class: Gastropoda
- Subclass: Caenogastropoda
- Order: Neogastropoda
- Family: Cancellariidae
- Genus: Massyla; H. Adams & A. Adams, 1854

Type species
- Cancellaria corrugata Hinds, 1843

Species
- See text

Synonyms
- Cancellaria (Massyla) H. Adams & A. Adams, 1854; † Charcolleria Olsson, 1942

= Massyla =

Genus of gastropods

Massyla is a genus of medium-sized sea snails, marine gastropod molluscs in the family Cancellariidae, the nutmeg snails.

== Species ==
According to the World Register of Marine Species (WoRMS), the following species with valid names are within the genus Massyla :

- Massyla corrugata (Hinds, 1843)
- Massyla cumingiana (Petit de la Saussaye, 1844)
