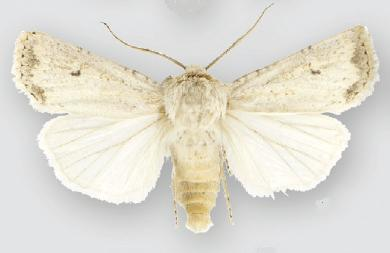
- Euxoa misturata (male)

Scientific classification
- Domain: Eukaryota
- Kingdom: Animalia
- Phylum: Arthropoda
- Class: Insecta
- Order: Lepidoptera
- Superfamily: Noctuoidea
- Family: Noctuidae
- Genus: Euxoa
- Species: E. misturata

Binomial name
- Euxoa misturata Smith, 1890

Synonyms
- Carneades misturata; Carneades perturbata; Carneades candida; Carneades falerina; Agrotis gian; Euxoa vertesta

= Euxoa misturata =

Species of moth

Euxoa misturata is a moth of the family Noctuidae. It is found in North America.

The wingspan is about 30 mm.
