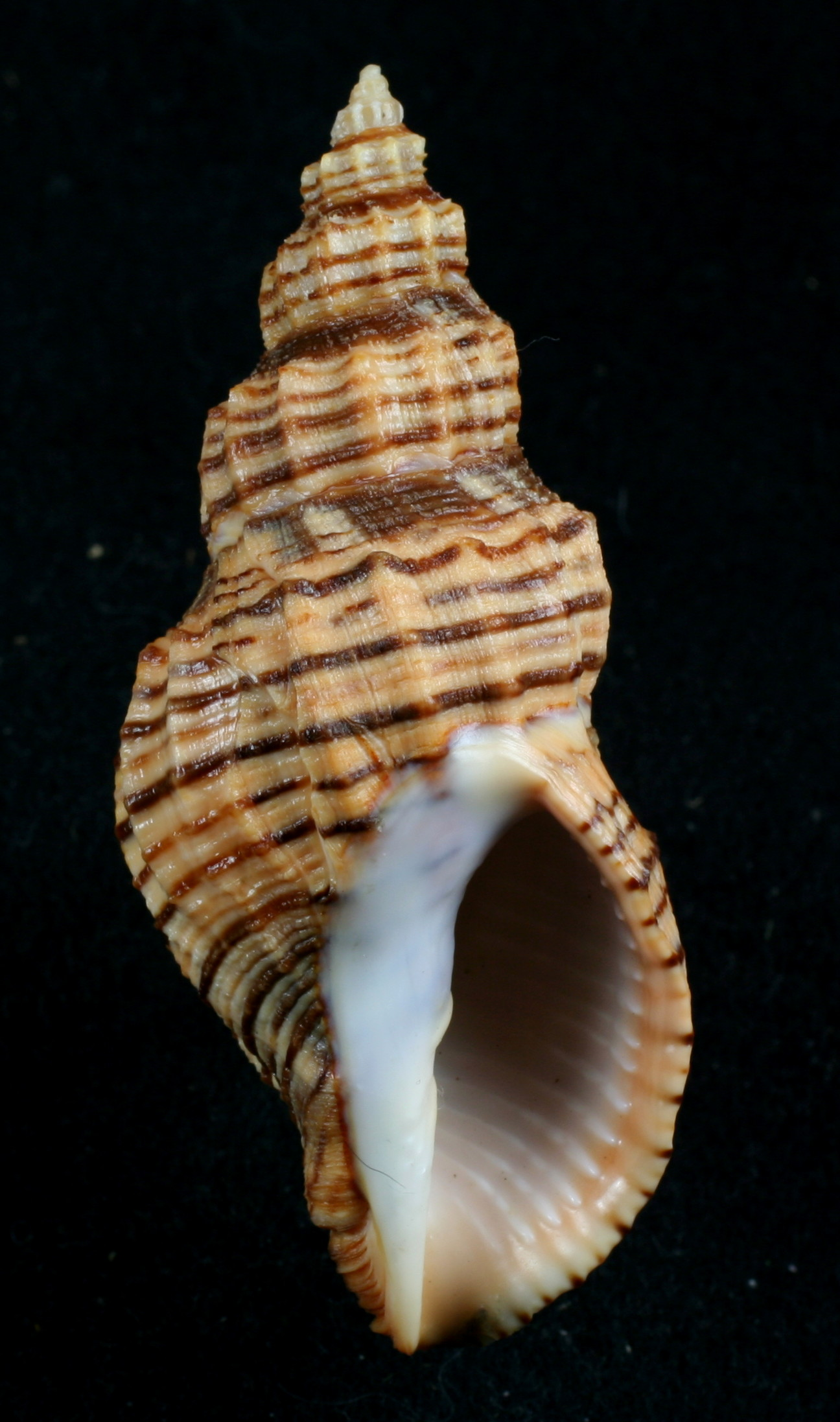
- Apertural view of shell of Cancellaria cooperii Gabb, 1865

Scientific classification
- Kingdom: Animalia
- Phylum: Mollusca
- Class: Gastropoda
- Subclass: Caenogastropoda
- Order: Neogastropoda
- Family: Cancellariidae
- Genus: Cancellaria
- Species: C. cooperii

Binomial name
- Cancellaria cooperii Gabb, 1865

= Cancellaria cooperii =

Species of gastropod

Cancellaria cooperii, common name Cooper's nutmeg, is a species of medium-sized to large sea snail, a marine gastropod mollusk in the family Cancellariidae, the nutmeg snails.

== Description ==
This species attains a size of around 95 mm.

== Ecology ==
=== Life habits ===
This species is an ectoparasite that parasitizes the Pacific electric ray, Torpedo californica, and perhaps other benthic fishes. Cooper's nutmeg is uncommonly found, offshore, on sandy substrate.

Known from depths 20 metres to 210 metres(prawn traps).

=== Distribution ===
This nutmeg snail occurs in the Eastern Pacific Ocean from Monterey, California, to San Benito Island, in central Baja California, Mexico.
