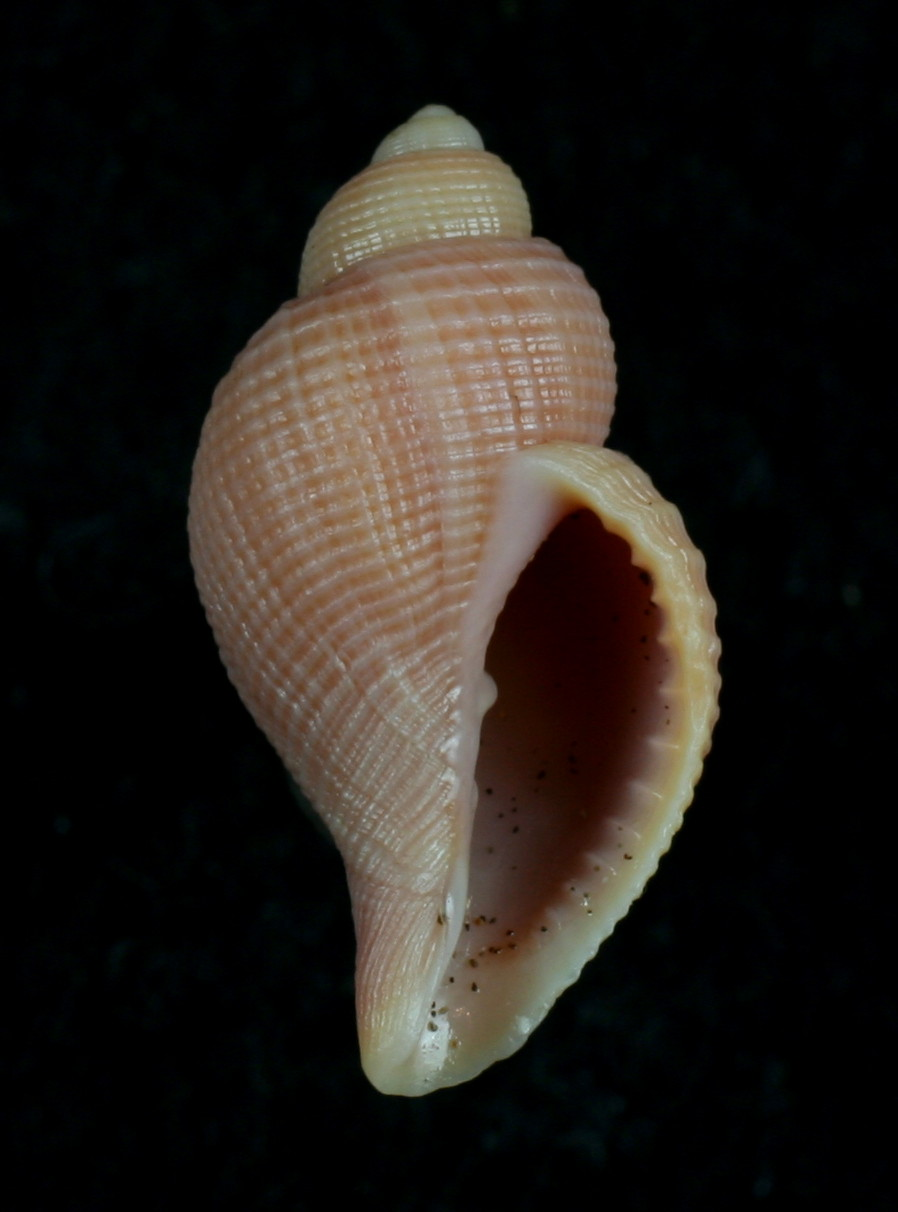
- Apertural view of shell of Massyla corrugata (Hinds, 1843)

Scientific classification
- Kingdom: Animalia
- Phylum: Mollusca
- Class: Gastropoda
- Subclass: Caenogastropoda
- Order: Neogastropoda
- Family: Cancellariidae
- Genus: Massyla
- Species: M. corrugata

Binomial name
- Massyla corrugata (Hinds, 1843)

Synonyms
- Cancellaria corrugata Hinds, 1843 (original combination)

= Massyla corrugata =

Species of gastropod

Massyla corrugata, common name the corrugated nutmeg, is a species of sea snail, a marine gastropod mollusk in the family Cancellariidae, the nutmeg snails.

== Description ==
The shell grows to a height of 18 mm. It has strong ridges or corrugations which is where the name comes from.

== Distribution ==
This species occurs in the eastern Pacific Ocean from Mexico to Ecuador.
