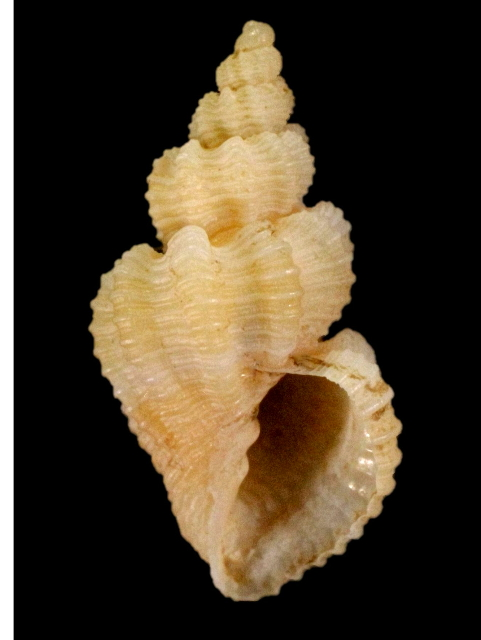
- Shell of Axelella scalatella

Scientific classification
- Kingdom: Animalia
- Phylum: Mollusca
- Class: Gastropoda
- Subclass: Caenogastropoda
- Order: Neogastropoda
- Family: Cancellariidae
- Genus: Axelella; Petit, 1988

Type species
- Cancellaria smithii Dall, 1888

Synonyms
- Agatrix (Olssonella) Petit, 1970 (Invalid: junior homonym of Olssonella Glibert & van de Poel, 1967); Olssonella Petit, 1970 (Iinvalid: junior homonym of Olssonella Glibert & van de Poel, 1967; Axelella is a replacement name)

= Axelella =

Genus of gastropods

Axelella is a genus of sea snails, marine gastropod mollusks in the family Cancellariidae, the nutmeg snails.

== Species ==
Species within the genus Axelella include:

- Axelella campbelli (Shasky, 1961)
- † Axelella casacantaurana Landau, Petit, Etter & C. M. Silva, 2012
- † Axelella cativa Landau, Petit & C. M. Silva, 2012
- † Axelella desmotis (J. A. Gardner, 1938)
- † Axelella emblema P. Jung & Petit, 1990
- † Axelella firma Petit & Schmelz, 1991
- Axelella funiculata (Hinds, 1843)
- † Axelella nutrita Landau, Petit, Etter & C. M. Silva, 2012
- † Axelella panamica (Petit, 1976)
- Axelella scalatella (Guppy, 1873)
- Axelella smithii (Dall, 1888)
- † Axelella sphenoidostoma (J. A. Gardner, 1938)
- † Axelella spherotopleura (J. A. Gardner, 1938)
- † Axelella thisbe (Olsson, 1964)
- † Axelella vokesae (Petit, 1970)
- † Axelella yara Landau & Petit, 1997

Species brought into synonymy

- Axelella brasiliensis Verhecken, 1991: synonym of Pseudobabylonella brasiliensis (Verhecken, 1991)
- Axelella kastoroae Verhecken, 1997: synonym of Nipponaphera kastoroae
- Axelella minima (Reeve, 1856): synonym of Pseudobabylonella minima
- Axelella nodosivaricosa (Petush, 1979): synonym of Nipponaphera nodosivaricosa
- Axelella semipellucida (A. Adams & Reeve, 1850): synonym of Nipponaphera semipellucida
- Axelella suduirauti Verhecken, 1999: synonym of Nipponaphera suduirauti (Verhecken, 1999)
