= Naron =

Naron or Naro, Narona may refer to:

- Naron, exo-planet HD 206610 b on constellation of Aquarius
- Narón, a municipality in Galicia, Spain
- Narona, village in Croatia
- Narona, gastropod genus
- Narona exopleura, gastropod species
- Narona clavatula, gastropod species
