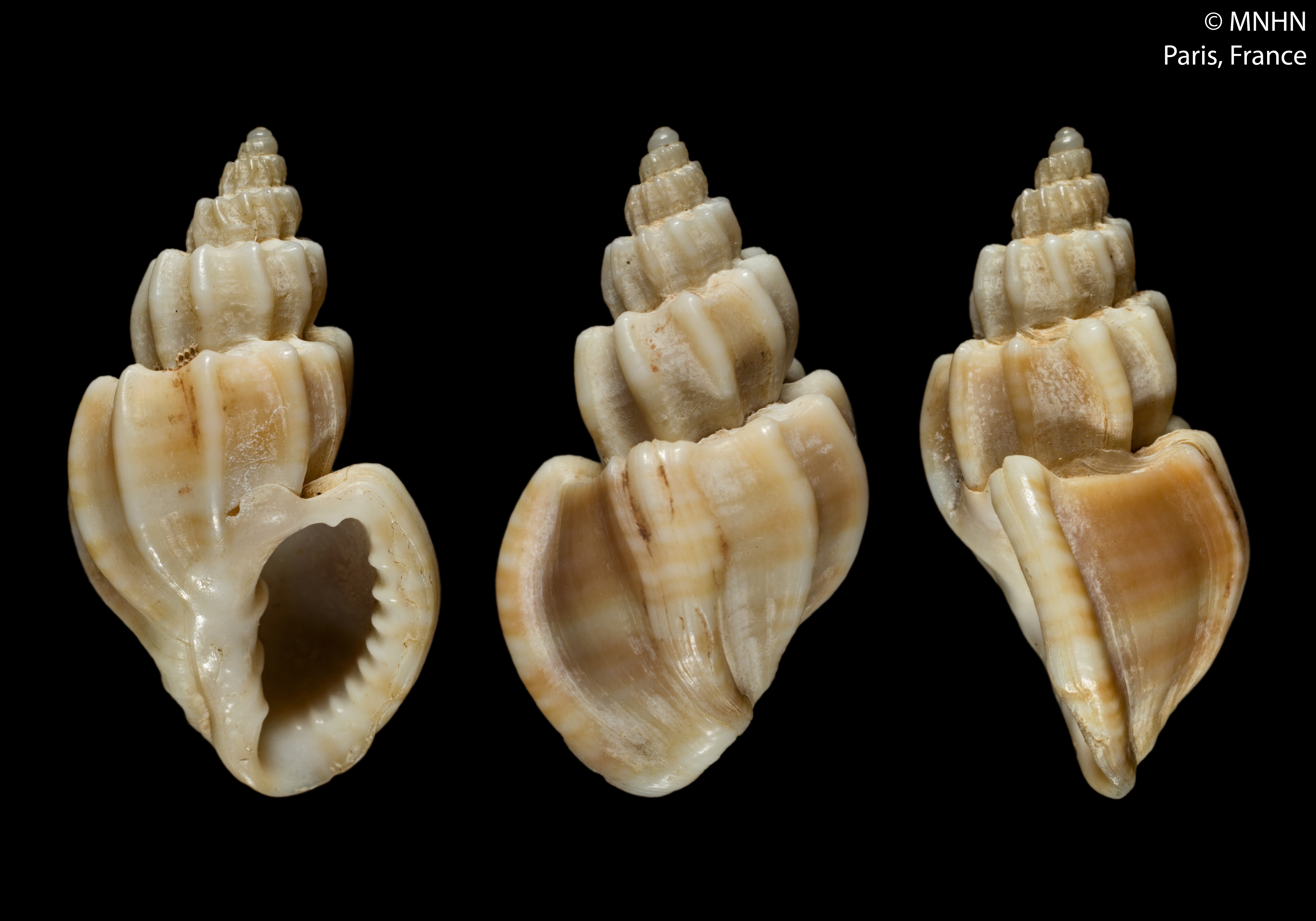
- Shell of Trigonaphera bocageana

Scientific classification
- Kingdom: Animalia
- Phylum: Mollusca
- Class: Gastropoda
- Subclass: Caenogastropoda
- Order: Neogastropoda
- Superfamily: Volutoidea
- Family: Cancellariidae
- Genus: Trigonaphera; Iredale, 1936

Synonyms
- Trigonophera Habe & Okutani 1985

= Trigonaphera =

Genus of gastropods

Trigonaphera is a genus of sea snails, marine gastropod mollusks in the family Cancellariidae, the nutmeg snails.

== Species ==
Species within the genus Trigonaphera include:

- Trigonaphera amakusana Petit, 1974
- Trigonaphera bocageana (Crosse & Debeaux, 1863)
- Trigonaphera dekkeri Verhecken, 2018
- Trigonaphera sinonippon Verhecken, 2018
- Trigonaphera stenomphala Habe, 1961
- Trigonaphera vinnulum (Iredale, 1925)

Species brought into synonymy

- Trigonaphera interlaevis Laseron, 1955: synonym of Trigonostoma bicolor (Hinds, 1843)
- Trigonaphera teramachii Habe, 1961: synonym of Nipponaphera teramachii (Habe, 1961)
- Trigonaphera tosaensis Habe, 1961: synonym of Mirandaphera tosaensis (Habe, 1961)
- Trigonaphera withrowi Petit, 1976: synonym of Trigonostoma scala (Gmelin, 1791)

== Bibliography ==
- Petit, R.E. & Harasewych, M.G. (2005) Catalogue of the superfamily Cancellarioidea Forbes and Hanley, 1851 (Gastropoda: Prosobranchia)- 2nd edition. Zootaxa, 1102, 3-161. NIZT 682
- Hemmen, J. (2007). Recent Cancellariidae. Annotated and illustrated catalogue of Recent Cancellariidae. Privately published, Wiesbaden. 428 pp.
