= Agatrix =

Scientific classification
- Kingdom: Animalia
- Phylum: Mollusca
- Class: Gastropoda
- Subclass: Caenogastropoda
- Order: Neogastropoda
- Family: Cancellariidae
- Genus: Agatrix; Petit, 1967

Genus of gastropods

Agatrix is a genus of sea snails, marine gastropod mollusks in the family Cancellariidae, the nutmeg snails.

== Species ==
Species within the genus Agatrix include:

- Agatrix agassizii (Dall, 1889)
- Agatrix epomis (Woodring, 1928)
- Agatrix strongi (Shasky, 1961)

Species brought into synonymy

- Agatrix deroyae Petit, 1970: synonym of Admetula deroyae (Petit, 1970)
- Agatrix nodosivaricosa Petuch, 1979: synonym of Nipponaphera nodosivaricosa (Petuch, 1979)
