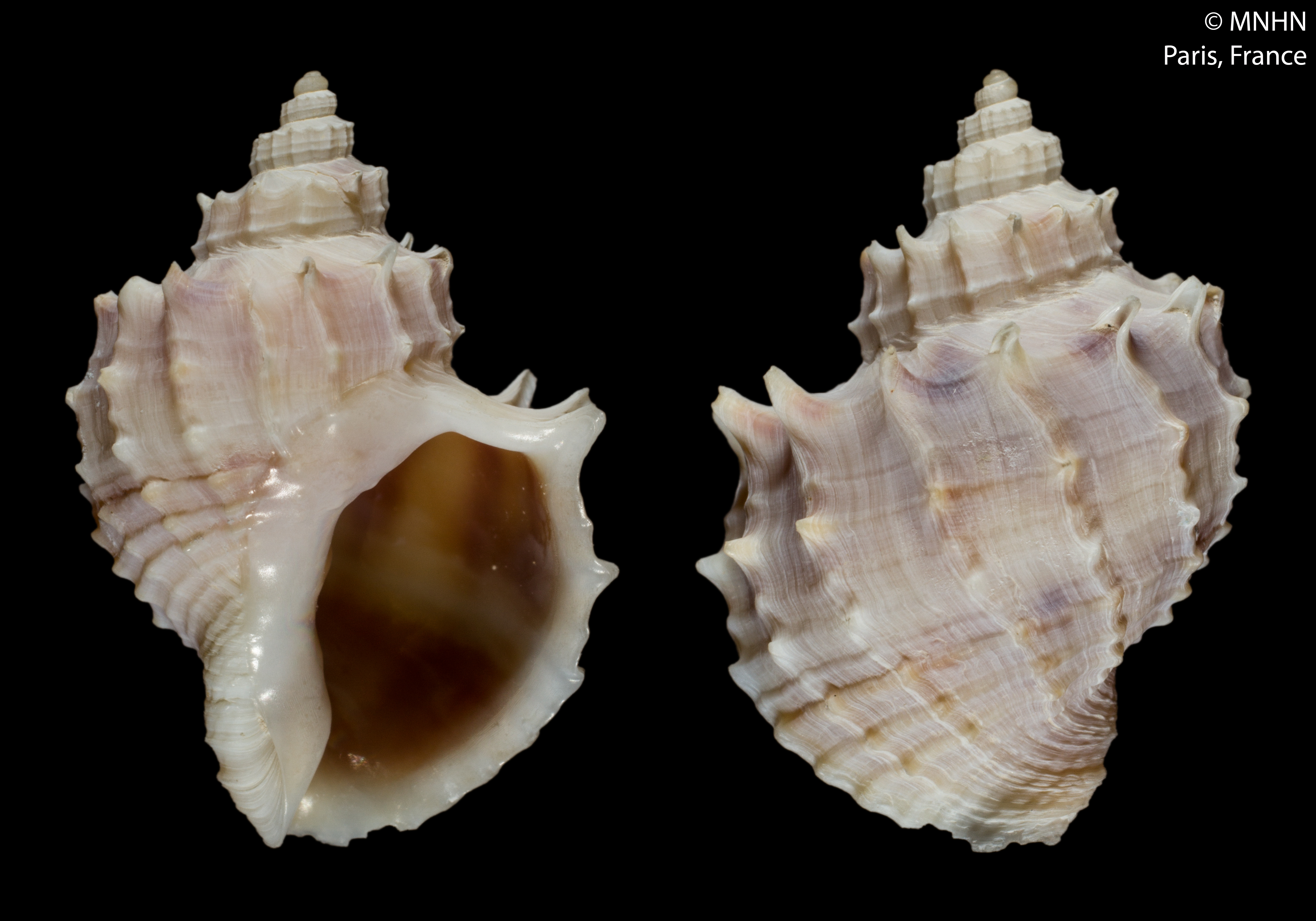
- Shell of Solatia piscatoria (neotype at MNHN, Paris)

Scientific classification
- Kingdom: Animalia
- Phylum: Mollusca
- Class: Gastropoda
- Subclass: Caenogastropoda
- Order: Neogastropoda
- Superfamily: Volutoidea
- Family: Cancellariidae
- Genus: Solatia; Jousseaume, 1887

Type species
- Solatia solat Jousseaume, 1887

= Solatia =

Genus of gastropods

Solatia is a genus of sea snails, marine gastropod mollusks in the family Cancellariidae, the nutmeg snails.

== Species ==
Species within the genus Solatia include:

- Solatia buccinoides (Sowerby, 1832)
- † Solatia exwestiana (Sacco, 1894)
- Solatia piscatoria (Gmelin, 1791)

Species brought into synonymy

- Solatia arafurensis Verhecken, 1997: synonym of Mirandaphera arafurensis (Verhecken, 1997)
- Solatia solat Jousseaume, 1887: synonym of Solatia piscatoria (Gmelin, 1791)
