= Tribia =

Scientific classification
- Kingdom: Animalia
- Phylum: Mollusca
- Class: Gastropoda
- Subclass: Caenogastropoda
- Order: Neogastropoda
- Family: Cancellariidae
- Genus: Tribia; Jousseaume, 1887

Type species
- Cancellaria angasi Crosse, 1863

Synonyms
- Cancellaria (Tribia) Jousseaume, 1887

Genus of gastropods

Tribia is a genus of sea snails, marine gastropod mollusks in the family Cancellariidae, the nutmeg snails.

== Species ==
Species within the genus Tribia include:

- Tribia angasi (Crosse, 1863)
- Tribia coronata (Scacchi, 1835)

Species brought into synonymy

- Tribia epomis Woodring, 1928 : synonym of Agatrix epomis (Woodring, 1928)
