= Pseudobabylonella =

Scientific classification
- Kingdom: Animalia
- Phylum: Mollusca
- Class: Gastropoda
- Subclass: Caenogastropoda
- Order: Neogastropoda
- Superfamily: Volutoidea
- Family: Cancellariidae
- Genus: Pseudobabylonella; Brunetti, Della Bella, Forli & Vecchi, 2009

Type species
- Cancellaria minima Reeve, 1856

Genus of gastropods

Pseudobabylonella is a genus of sea snails, marine gastropod molluscs in the subfamily Admetinae of the family Cancellariidae, the nutmeg snails.

== Species ==
Species within the genus Plesiotriton include:

- † Pseudobabylonella fusiformis (Cantraine, 1835)
- Pseudobabylonella minima (Reeve, 1856)
- †Pseudobabylonella nysti (Hörnes, 1854)
- †Pseudobabylonella pusilla (Philippi, 1843)

Synonyms

- Pseudobabylonella brasiliensis (Verhecken, 1991): synonym of Microcancilla brasiliensis (Verhecken, 1991)
