= Nipponaphera habei =

Scientific classification
- Kingdom: Animalia
- Phylum: Mollusca
- Class: Gastropoda
- Subclass: Caenogastropoda
- Order: Neogastropoda
- Family: Cancellariidae
- Genus: Nipponaphera
- Species: N. habei

Binomial name
- Nipponaphera habei Petit, 1972

Species of gastropod

Nipponaphera habei is a species of sea snail, a marine gastropod mollusk in the family Cancellariidae, the nutmeg snails.
