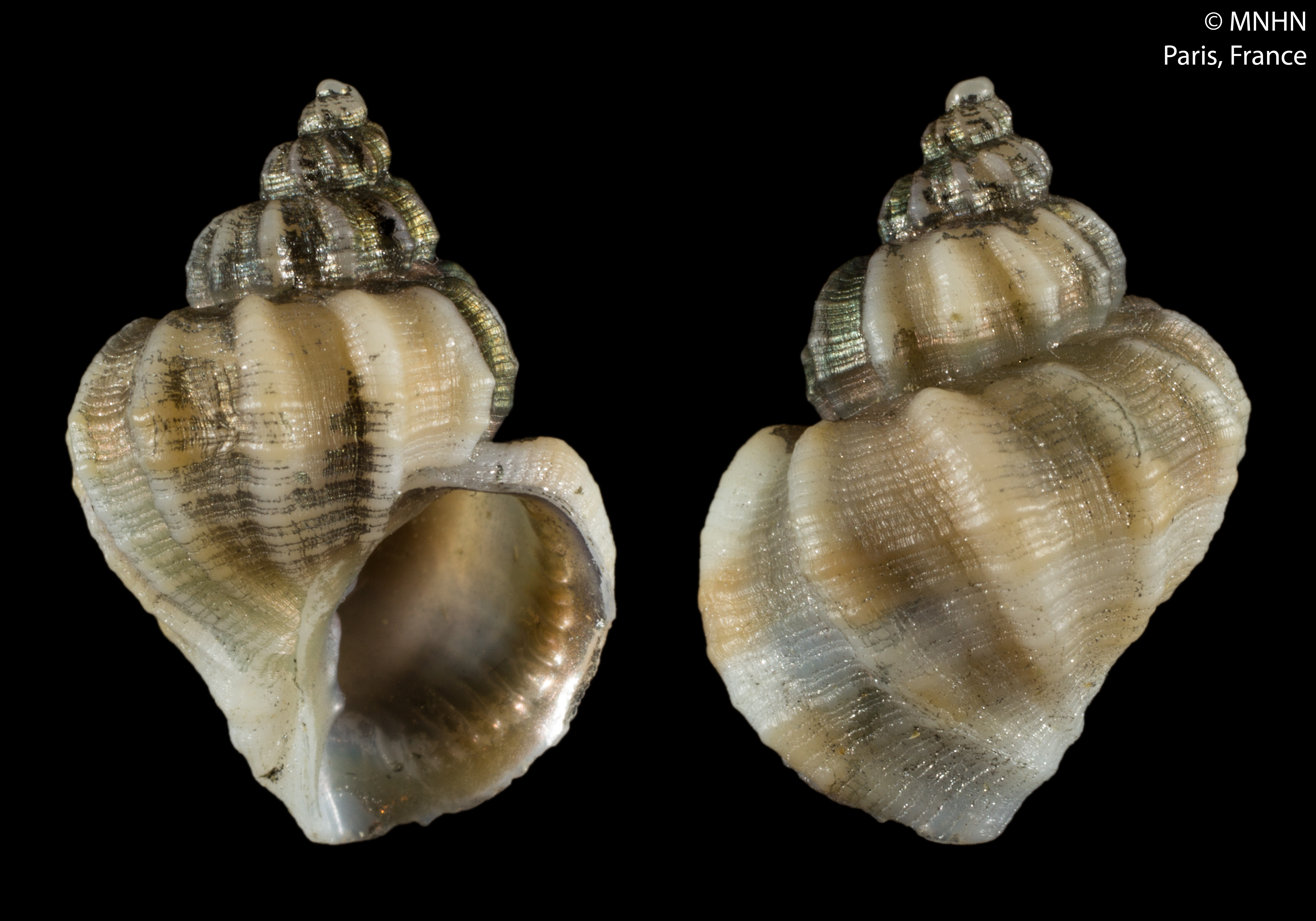
- Shell of Nipponaphera cyphoma (holotype at MNHN, Paris)

Scientific classification
- Kingdom: Animalia
- Phylum: Mollusca
- Class: Gastropoda
- Subclass: Caenogastropoda
- Order: Neogastropoda
- Family: Cancellariidae
- Genus: Nipponaphera
- Species: N. cyphoma

Binomial name
- Nipponaphera cyphoma Bouchet & Petit, 2002

= Nipponaphera cyphoma =

Species of gastropod

Nipponaphera cyphoma is a species of sea snail, a marine gastropod mollusk in the family Cancellariidae, the nutmeg snails.

== Description ==
The length of the shell attains 12.9 mm.

Its shell is a rounded spiral shape with lengthwise brown barring alternating with white ridges. The lower brown gradients to a black-grey with tones of brown as the shell tapers to a point.

== Distribution ==
This marine species occurs off New Caledonia. It is a deep-water Cancellariidae from the southwestern Pacific Ocean.
