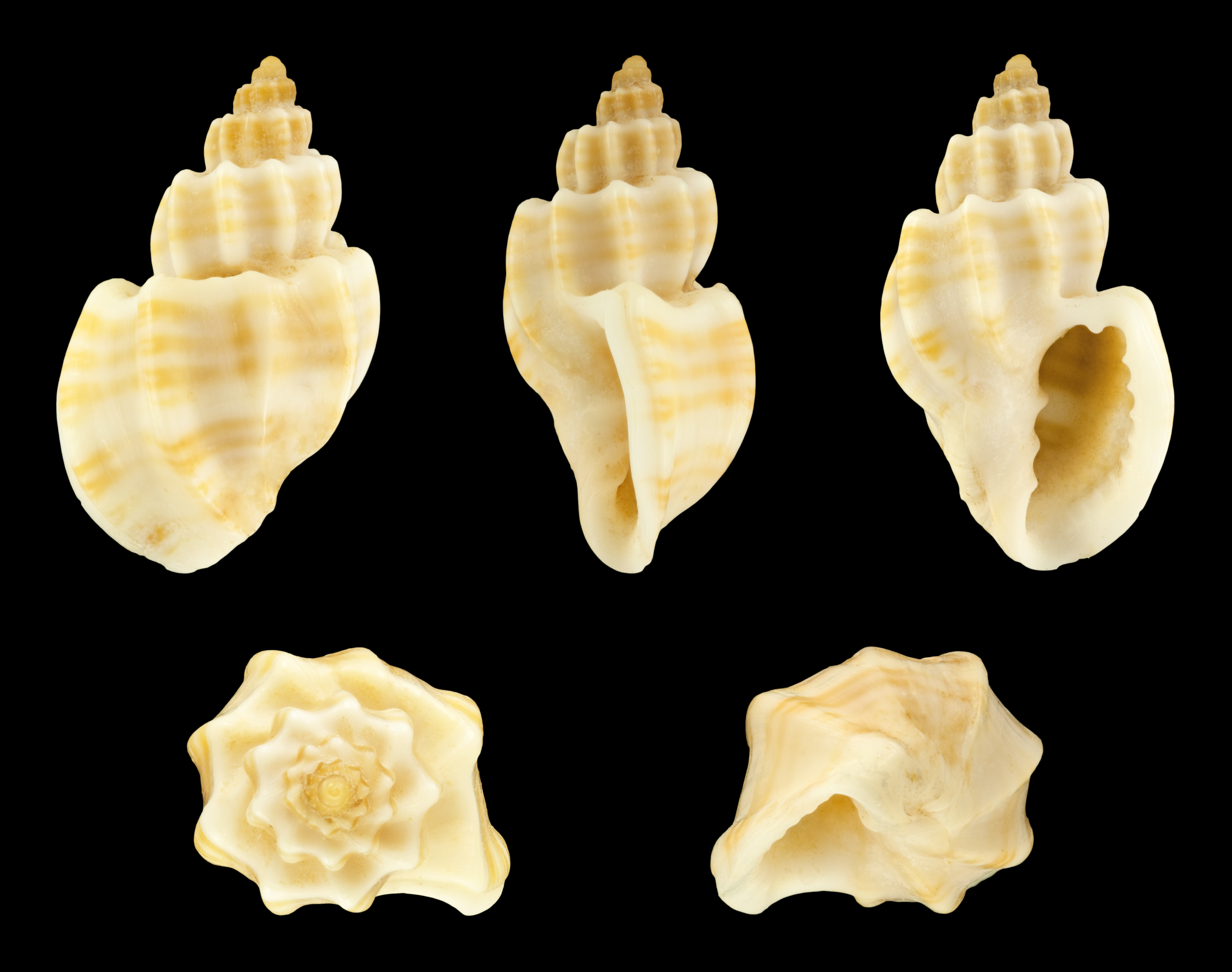
- Trigonaphera bocageana shell

Scientific classification
- Kingdom: Animalia
- Phylum: Mollusca
- Class: Gastropoda
- Subclass: Caenogastropoda
- Order: Neogastropoda
- Family: Cancellariidae
- Genus: Trigonaphera
- Species: T. bocageana

Binomial name
- Trigonaphera bocageana (Crosse & Debeaux, 1863)

Synonyms
- Cancellaria bocageana Crosse & Debeaux, 1863 ·

= Trigonaphera bocageana =

Species of gastropod

Trigonaphera bocageana is a species of sea snail, a marine gastropod mollusk in the family Cancellariidae, the nutmeg snails.

== Description ==
The length of the shell attains 20 mm (0.79 in).

== Distribution ==
This marine species occurs in China, Japan, Taiwan, and the Philippines.
