= Trigonaphera vinnulum =

Scientific classification
- Kingdom: Animalia
- Phylum: Mollusca
- Class: Gastropoda
- Subclass: Caenogastropoda
- Order: Neogastropoda
- Superfamily: Volutoidea
- Family: Cancellariidae
- Genus: Trigonaphera
- Species: T. vinnulum

Binomial name
- Trigonaphera vinnulum Iredale, 1925

Synonyms
- Scalptia vinnulum (Iredale, 1925); Trigonostoma vinnulum Iredale, 1925(original combination)

Species of gastropod

Trigonaphera vinnulum is a species of sea snail, a marine gastropod mollusc in the family Cancellariidae, the nutmeg snails.
