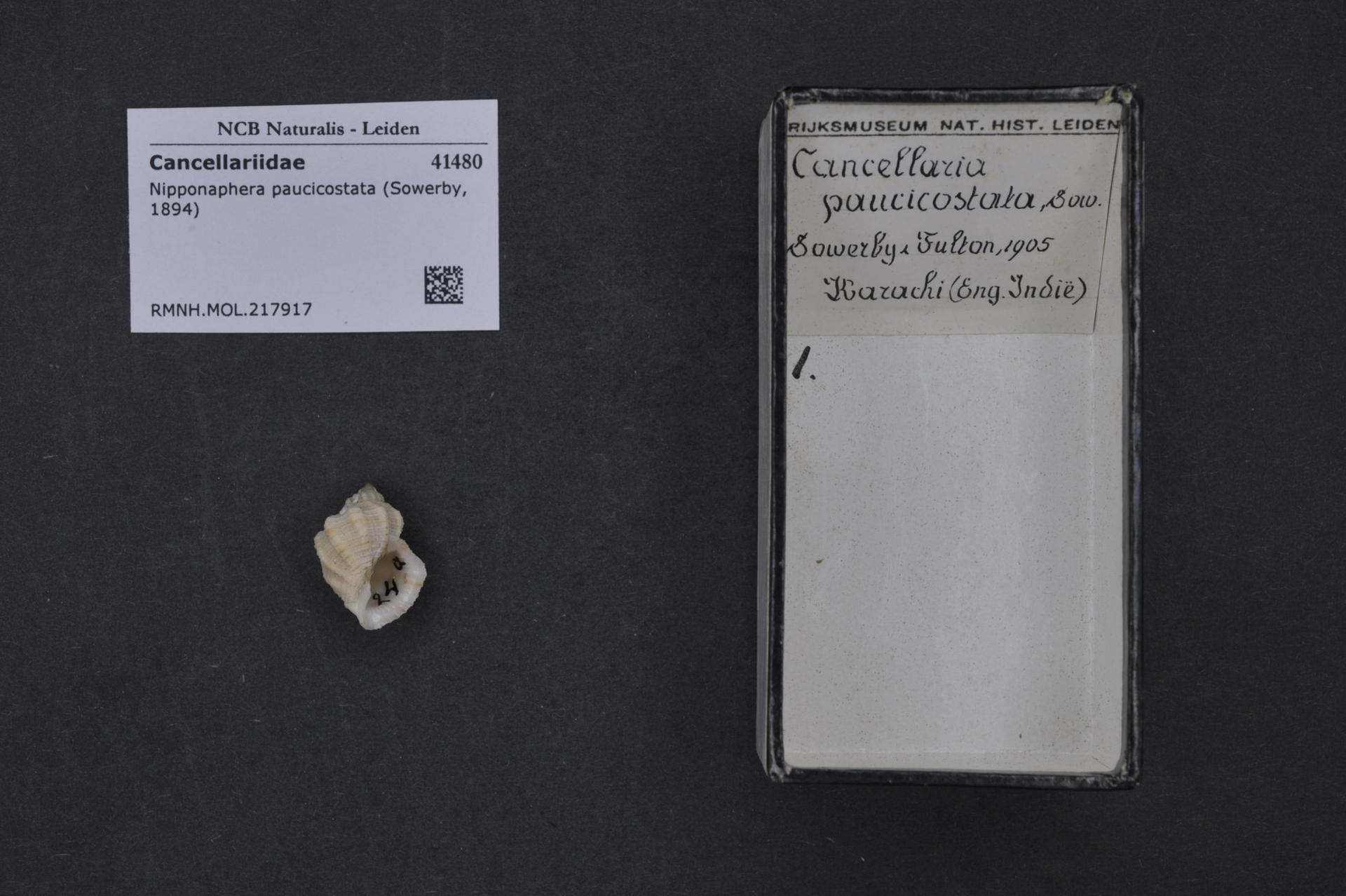

Scientific classification
- Kingdom: Animalia
- Phylum: Mollusca
- Class: Gastropoda
- Subclass: Caenogastropoda
- Order: Neogastropoda
- Family: Cancellariidae
- Genus: Nipponaphera
- Species: N. paucicostata

Binomial name
- Nipponaphera paucicostata (G.B. Sowerby III, 1894)

Synonyms
- Cancellaria paucicostata G.B. Sowerby III, 1894

= Nipponaphera paucicostata =

Species of gastropod

Nipponaphera paucicostata is a species of sea snail, a marine gastropod mollusk in the family Cancellariidae, the nutmeg snails.
