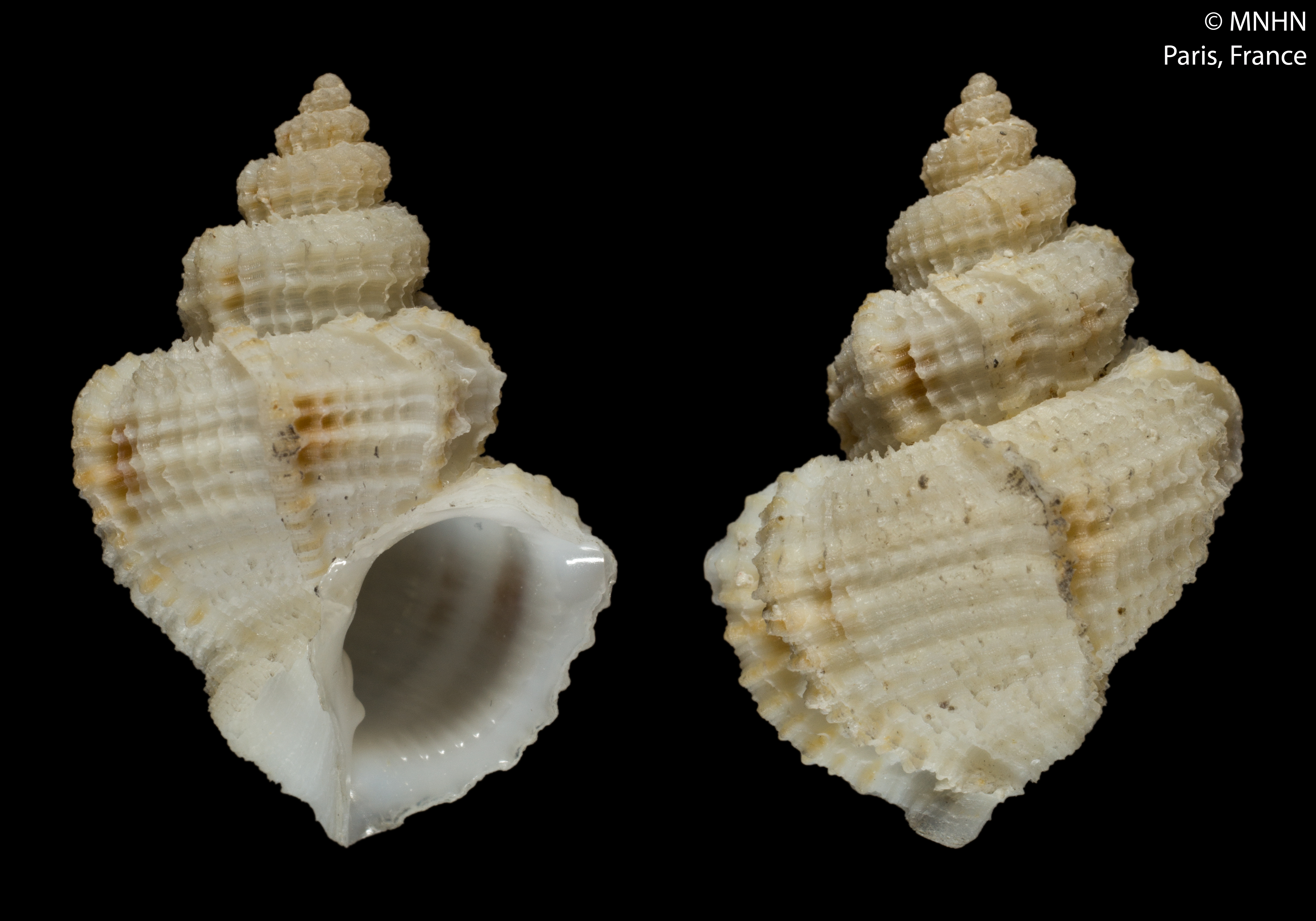
- Shell of Nipponaphera pardalis (holotype at MNHN, Paris)

Scientific classification
- Kingdom: Animalia
- Phylum: Mollusca
- Class: Gastropoda
- Subclass: Caenogastropoda
- Order: Neogastropoda
- Superfamily: Volutoidea
- Family: Cancellariidae
- Genus: Nipponaphera; Habe, 1961

Type species
- Nipponaphera habei Petit, 1972

= Nipponaphera =

Genus of gastropods

Nipponaphera is a genus of sea snails, marine gastropod mollusks in the family Cancellariidae, the nutmeg snails.

== Species ==
Species within the genus Nipponaphera include:

- Nipponaphera agastor Bouchet & Petit, 2008
- Nipponaphera argo Bouchet & Petit, 2008
- Nipponaphera cyphoma Bouchet & Petit, 2002
- Nipponaphera goniata Bouchet & Petit, 2002
- Nipponaphera habei Petit, 1972
- Nipponaphera iwaotakii Habe, 1961
- Nipponaphera kastoroae (Verhecken, 1997)
- Nipponaphera nodosivaricosa (Petuch, 1979)
- Nipponaphera pardalis Bouchet & Petit, 2002
- Nipponaphera paucicostata (G.B. Sowerby III, 1894)
- Nipponaphera quasilla (Petit, 1987)
- Nipponaphera semipellucida (A. Adams & Reeve, 1850)
- Nipponaphera suduirauti (Verhecken, 1999)
- Nipponaphera teramachii (Habe, 1961a)
- Nipponaphera tuba Bouchet & Petit, 2008
- Nipponaphera wallacei Petit & Harasewych, 2000
