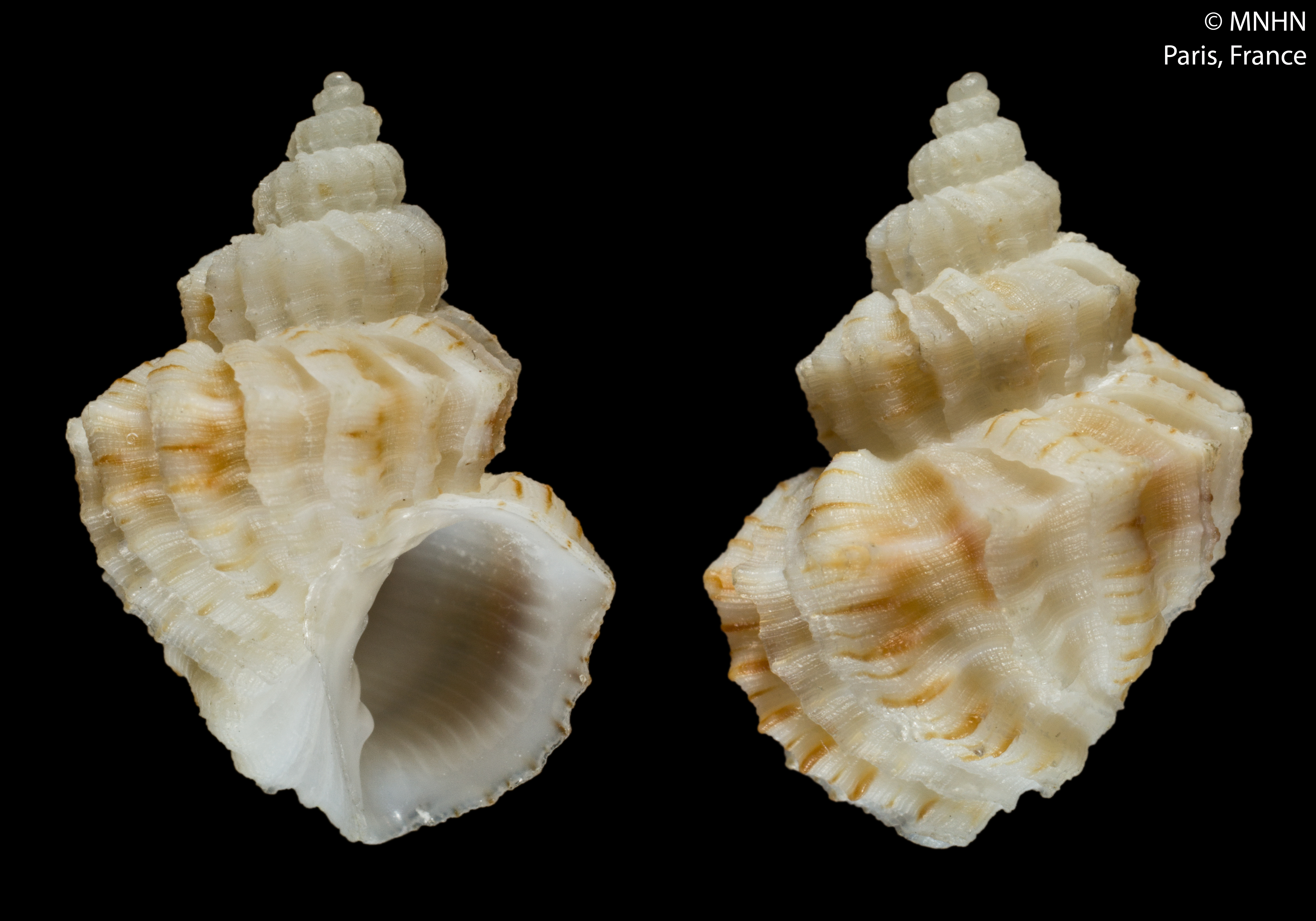
- Shell of Nipponaphera goniata (holotype at MNHN, Paris)

Scientific classification
- Kingdom: Animalia
- Phylum: Mollusca
- Class: Gastropoda
- Subclass: Caenogastropoda
- Order: Neogastropoda
- Family: Cancellariidae
- Genus: Nipponaphera
- Species: N. goniata

Binomial name
- Nipponaphera goniata Bouchet & Petit, 2002

= Nipponaphera goniata =

Species of gastropod

Nipponaphera goniata is a species of sea snail, a marine gastropod mollusk in the family Cancellariidae, the nutmeg snails.

== Description ==
It has a yellow and cream colored shell. The length of the shell attains 16.1 mm.

== Distribution ==
This marine species occurs off New Caledonia.
