= Microcancilla jonasi =

Scientific classification
- Kingdom: Animalia
- Phylum: Mollusca
- Class: Gastropoda
- Subclass: Caenogastropoda
- Order: Neogastropoda
- Family: Cancellariidae
- Genus: Microcancilla
- Species: M. jonasi

Binomial name
- Microcancilla jonasi de Barros & Petit, 2007

Species of gastropod

Microcancilla jonasi is a species of sea snail, a marine gastropod mollusk in the family Cancellariidae, the nutmeg snails.
