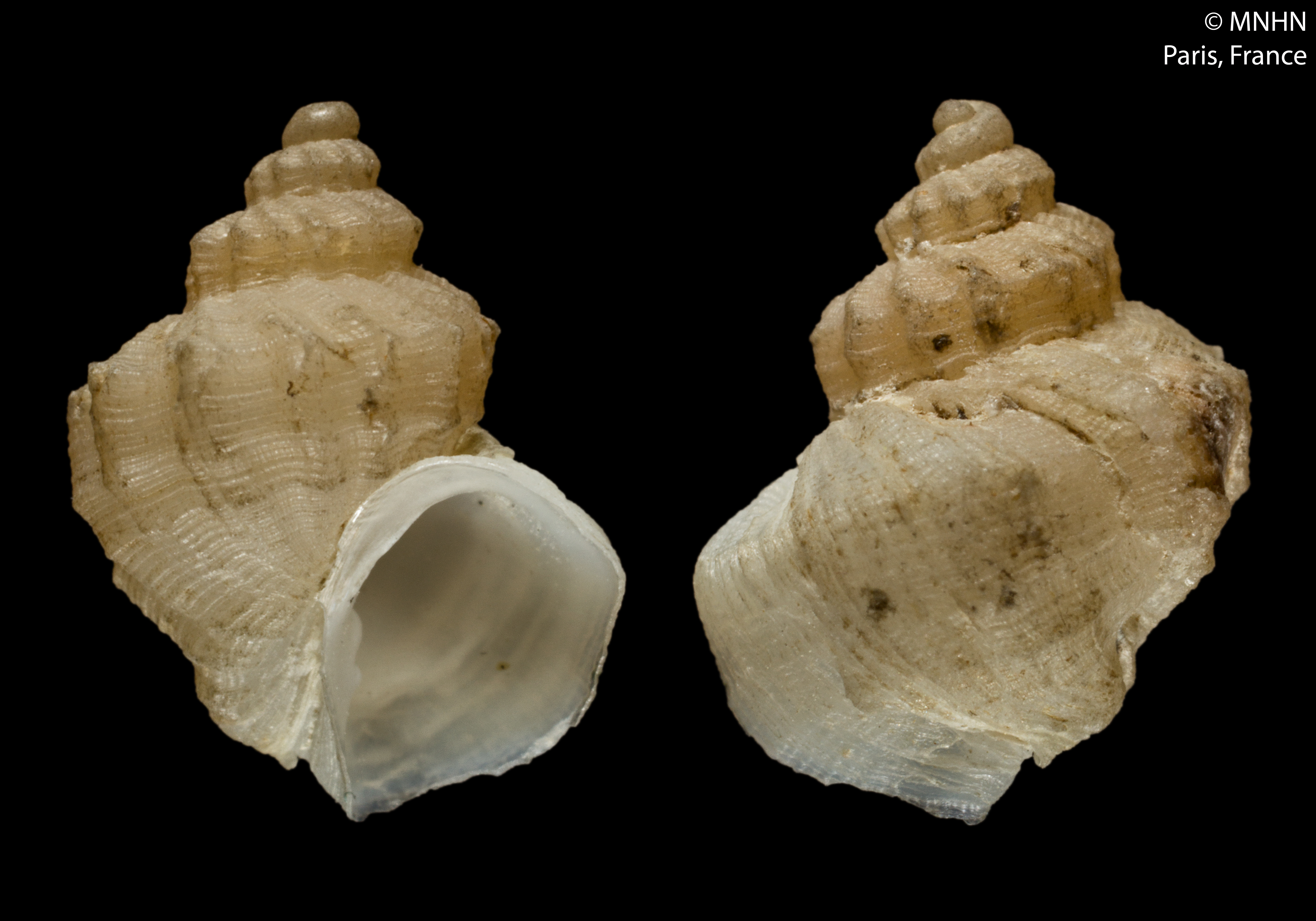
- Shell of Nipponaphera argo (holotype at MNHN, Paris)

Scientific classification
- Kingdom: Animalia
- Phylum: Mollusca
- Class: Gastropoda
- Subclass: Caenogastropoda
- Order: Neogastropoda
- Family: Cancellariidae
- Genus: Nipponaphera
- Species: N. argo

Binomial name
- Nipponaphera argo Bouchet & Petit, 2008

= Nipponaphera argo =

Species of gastropod

Nipponaphera argo is a species of sea snail, a marine gastropod mollusk in the family Cancellariidae, the nutmeg snails.

== Description ==
The length of the shell attains 8.6 mm.

== Distribution ==
This species occurs in the Coral Sea.
