= Axelella funiculata =

Scientific classification
- Kingdom: Animalia
- Phylum: Mollusca
- Class: Gastropoda
- Subclass: Caenogastropoda
- Order: Neogastropoda
- Family: Cancellariidae
- Genus: Axelella
- Species: A. funiculata

Binomial name
- Axelella funiculata (Hinds, 1843)

Synonyms
- Cancellaria funiculata Hinds, 1843

Species of gastropod

Axelella funiculata is a species of sea snail, a marine gastropod mollusc in the family Cancellariidae, the nutmeg snails.

== Description ==
(Original description in Latin) The shell is egg-shaped and elongated; it has six whorls, ribbed and slightly angled above. The ribs are somewhat spaced, raised, rounded, and nodular, crossed by elevated lines. The suture is deep. The lip is grooved on the inside. The columella bears three small folds. The umbilicus is bordered, and the siphonal canal is nearly absent.

== Distribution ==
This species occurs in the Gulf of California.
