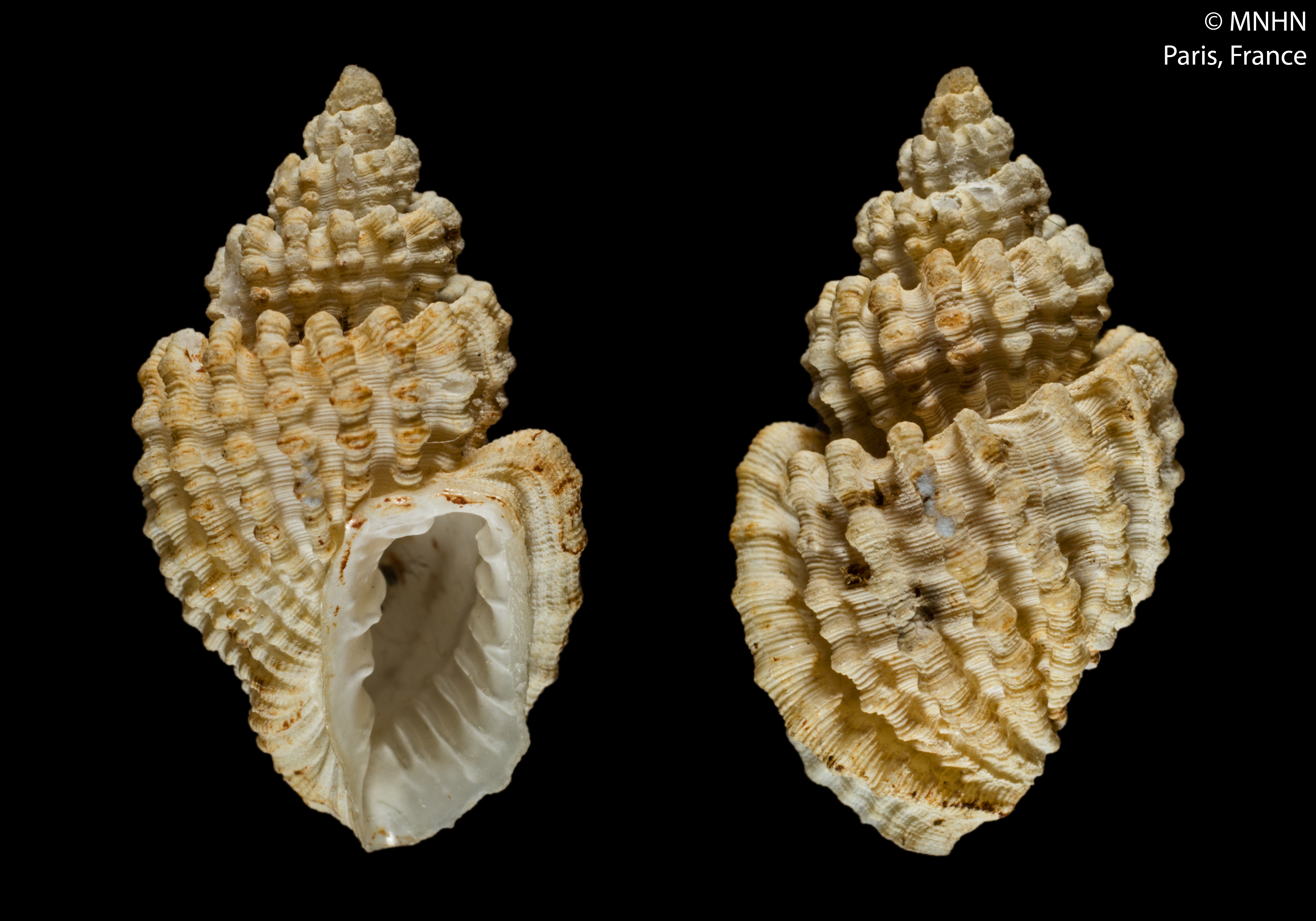
- Shell of Mirandaphera maestratii (holotype at MNHN, Paris)

Scientific classification
- Kingdom: Animalia
- Phylum: Mollusca
- Class: Gastropoda
- Subclass: Caenogastropoda
- Order: Neogastropoda
- Family: Cancellariidae
- Genus: Mirandaphera
- Species: M. maestratii

Binomial name
- Mirandaphera maestratii Bouchet & Petit, 2002

= Mirandaphera maestratii =

Species of gastropod

Mirandaphera maestratii is a species of sea snail, a marine gastropod mollusc in the family Cancellariidae, the nutmeg snails.

== Description ==
The length of the shell attains 14 mm.

== Distribution ==
This marine species occurs off New Caledonia.
