= Microcancilla microscopica =

Scientific classification
- Kingdom: Animalia
- Phylum: Mollusca
- Class: Gastropoda
- Subclass: Caenogastropoda
- Order: Neogastropoda
- Family: Cancellariidae
- Genus: Microcancilla
- Species: M. microscopica

Binomial name
- Microcancilla microscopica (Dall, 1889)

Synonyms
- Admete microscopica (Dall, 1889); Cancellaria microscopica Dall, 1889

Species of gastropod

Microcancilla microscopica is a species of sea snail, a marine gastropod mollusk in the family Cancellariidae, the nutmeg snails. Species in this family are commonly referred to as nutmeg snails and are characterized by a coiled shell typical of marine gastropods.
