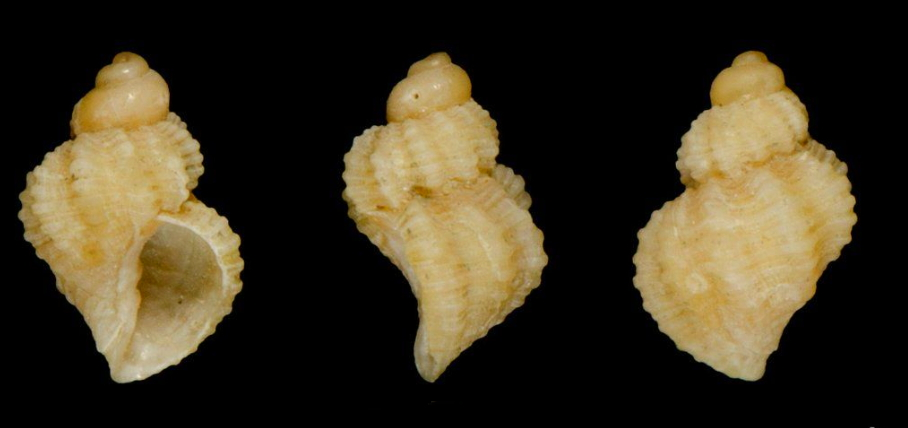
- Shell of Axelella smithii (syntype at the National Museum of Natural History, Smithsonian Institution)

Scientific classification
- Kingdom: Animalia
- Phylum: Mollusca
- Class: Gastropoda
- Subclass: Caenogastropoda
- Order: Neogastropoda
- Family: Cancellariidae
- Genus: Axelella
- Species: A. smithii

Binomial name
- Axelella smithii (Dall, 1888)

Synonyms
- Cancellaria smithii Dall, 1888; Olssonella smithii (Dall, 1888) superseded combination

= Axelella smithii =

Species of gastropod

Axelella smithii is a species of sea snail, a marine gastropod mollusk in the family Cancellariidae, the nutmeg snails.

== Distribution ==
This deep-water species occurs from the continental shelf off North Carolina, south past South Carolina and Georgia, and down the eastern coast of Florida.
