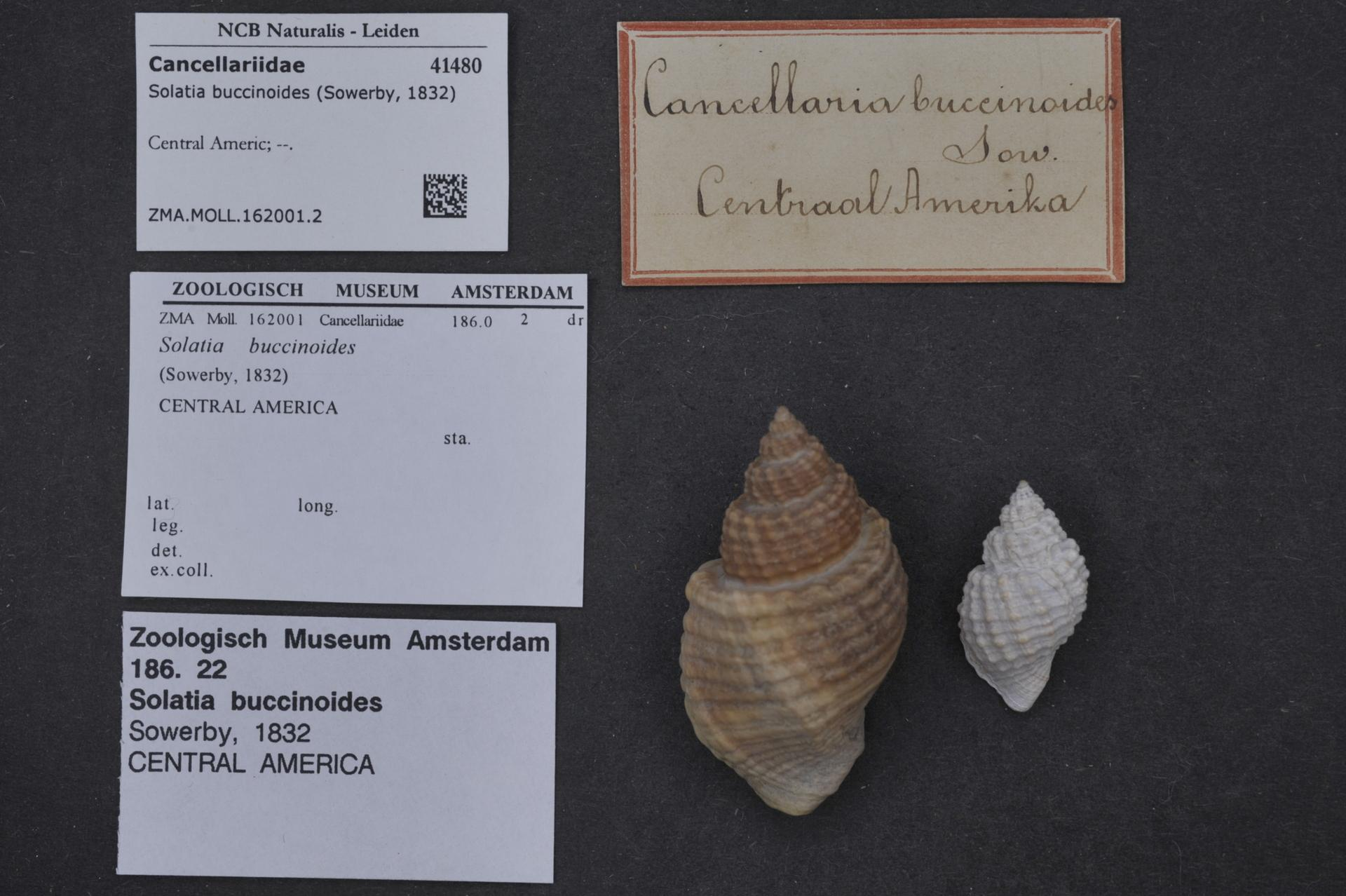
- Solatia buccinoides (Sowerby, 1832)

Scientific classification
- Kingdom: Animalia
- Phylum: Mollusca
- Class: Gastropoda
- Subclass: Caenogastropoda
- Order: Neogastropoda
- Family: Cancellariidae
- Genus: Solatia
- Species: S. buccinoides

Binomial name
- Solatia buccinoides (Sowerby, 1832)

= Solatia buccinoides =

Species of gastropod

Solatia buccinoides is a species of sea snail, a marine gastropod mollusk in the family Cancellariidae, the nutmeg snails.
