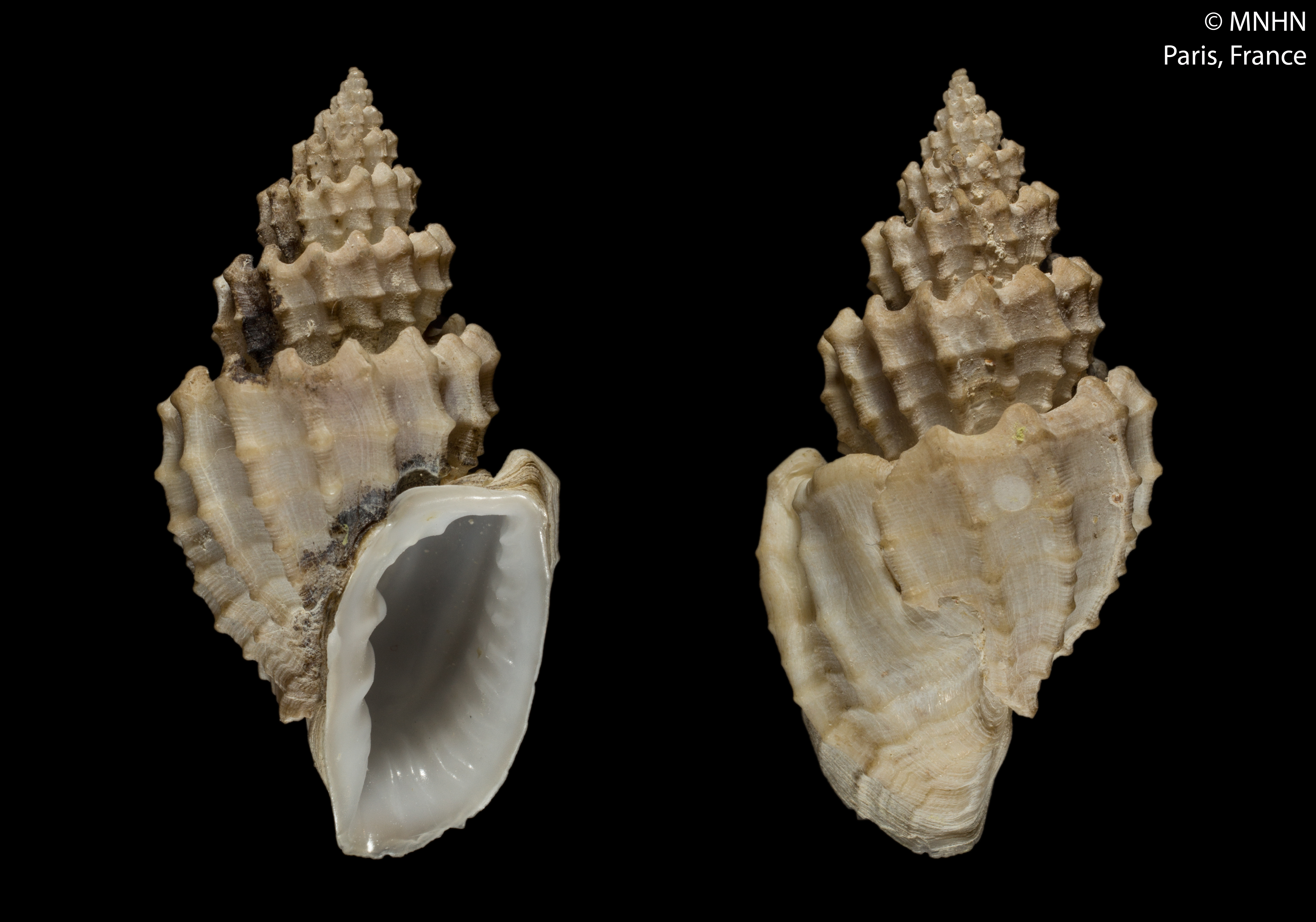
- Mirandaphera cayrei

Scientific classification
- Kingdom: Animalia
- Phylum: Mollusca
- Class: Gastropoda
- Subclass: Caenogastropoda
- Order: Neogastropoda
- Superfamily: Volutoidea
- Family: Cancellariidae
- Genus: Mirandaphera; Bouchet & Petit, 2002

Type species
- Mirandaphera cayrei Bouchet & Petit, 2002

= Mirandaphera =

Genus of sea snails

Mirandaphera is a genus of sea snails, marine gastropod mollusks in the family Cancellariidae, the nutmeg snails.

== Species ==
Species within the genus Mirandaphera include:

- Mirandaphera arafurensis (Verhecken, 1997)
- Mirandaphera cayrei Bouchet & Petit, 2002
- Mirandaphera maestratii Bouchet & Petit, 2002
- Mirandaphera tosaensis (Habe, 1961a)
