= Nipponaphera quasilla =

Scientific classification
- Kingdom: Animalia
- Phylum: Mollusca
- Class: Gastropoda
- Subclass: Caenogastropoda
- Order: Neogastropoda
- Family: Cancellariidae
- Genus: Nipponaphera
- Species: N. quasilla

Binomial name
- Nipponaphera quasilla (Petit, 1987)

Synonyms
- Cancellaria cretacea E.A. Smith, 1899 (non Nyst, 1881); Cancellaria quasilla Petit, 1987

Species of gastropod

Nipponaphera quasilla is a species of sea snail, a marine gastropod mollusk in the family Cancellariidae, the nutmeg snails.

== Description ==
The shell size is 25 mm.

== Distribution ==
This species is distributed along Somalia; Southern India and Southern Burma.
