= Axelella campbelli =

Scientific classification
- Kingdom: Animalia
- Phylum: Mollusca
- Class: Gastropoda
- Subclass: Caenogastropoda
- Order: Neogastropoda
- Family: Cancellariidae
- Genus: Axelella
- Species: A. campbelli

Binomial name
- Axelella campbelli (Shasky, 1961)

Synonyms
- Cancellaria campbelli (Shasky, 1961); Trigonostoma campbelli Shasky, 1961

Species of gastropod

Axelella campbelli is a species of sea snail, a marine gastropod mollusk in the family Cancellariidae, the nutmeg snails.

== Description ==
The length of the shell attains 16 mm, its diameter is 9.3 mm.

== Distriubtion ==
This species occurs in the Gulf of California.
