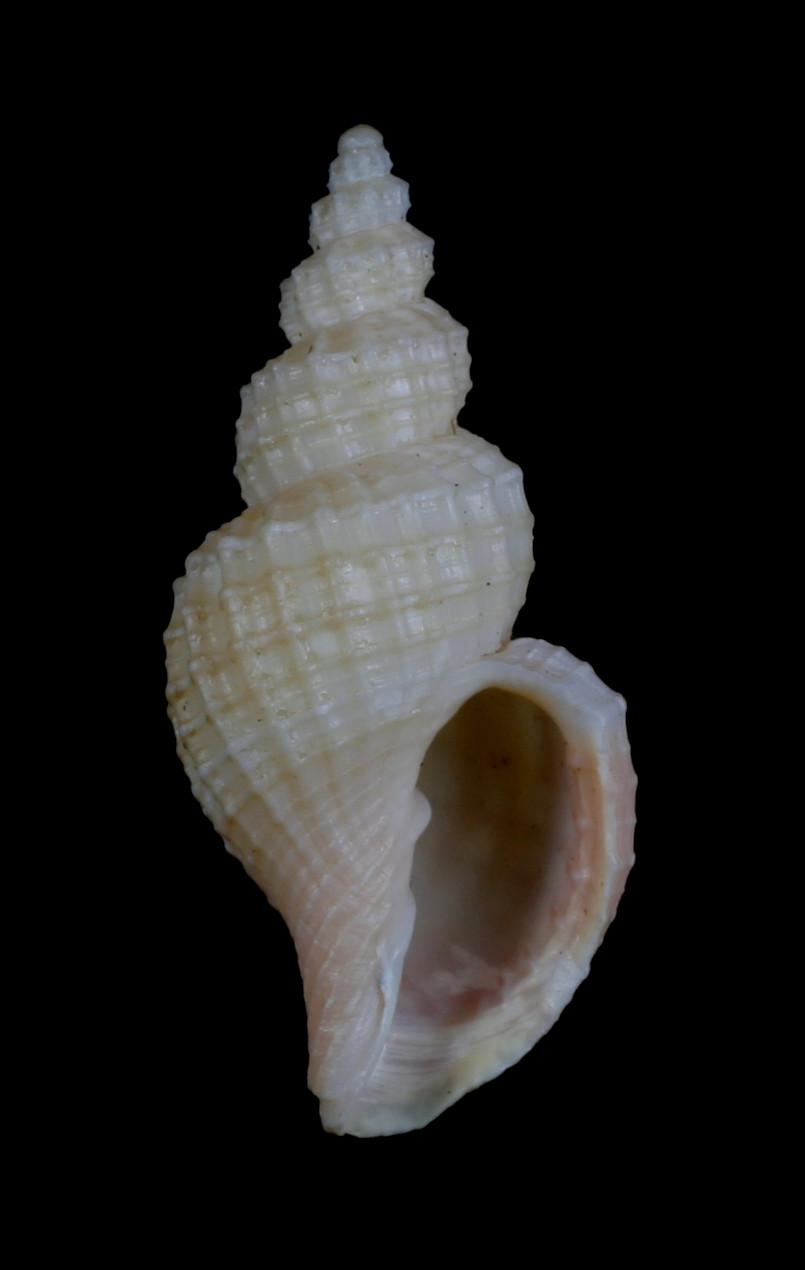
- Apertural view of shell of Narona exopleura (Dall, 1908)

Scientific classification
- Kingdom: Animalia
- Phylum: Mollusca
- Class: Gastropoda
- Subclass: Caenogastropoda
- Order: Neogastropoda
- Family: Cancellariidae
- Genus: Narona; H. Adams & A. Adams, 1854

Type species
- Cancellaria clavatula G.B. Sowerby I, 1832

Synonyms
- Cancellaria (Narona) H. Adams & A. Adams, 1854 (original rank); Panarona Petit, 1975

= Narona (gastropod) =

Genus of gastropods

Narona is a genus of sea snails, marine gastropod mollusks in the family Cancellariidae, the nutmeg snails.

== Species ==
Species within the genus Narona include:

- † Narona barystoma (Woodring, 1970)
- Narona clavatula (G.B. Sowerby I, 1832)
- † Narona decaptyx (Brown & Pilsbry, 1911)
- Narona exopleura (Dall, 1908)

Species brought into synonymy

- † Narona austropolonica Bałuk, 1997: synonym of † Aneurystoma afenestrata (Sacco, 1894) (junior synonym)
- Narona coronata (Scacchi, 1835) : synonym of Tribia coronata (Scacchi, 1835)
- Narona hidalgoi Jousseaume, 1887: synonym of Narona clavatula (G.B. Sowerby I, 1832)
- Narona mitriformis (G.B. Sowerby I, 1832): synonym of Hertleinia mitriformis (G.B. Sowerby I, 1832)

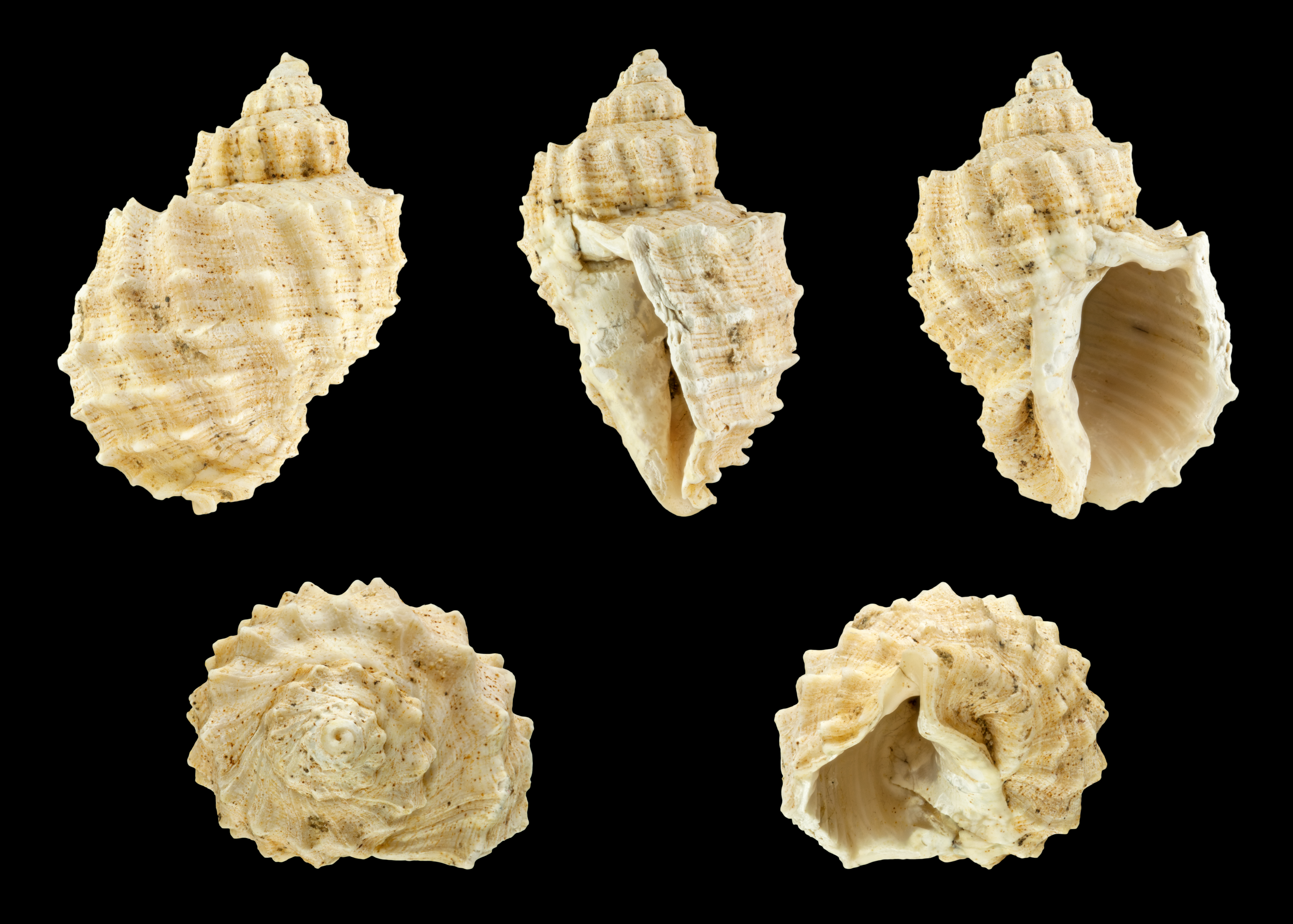
Narona hirta, Pliocene, Italy
