= Agatrix strongi =

Scientific classification
- Kingdom: Animalia
- Phylum: Mollusca
- Class: Gastropoda
- Subclass: Caenogastropoda
- Order: Neogastropoda
- Family: Cancellariidae
- Genus: Agatrix
- Species: A. strongi

Binomial name
- Agatrix strongi (Shasky, 1961)

Synonyms
- Cancellaria strongi Shasky, 1961

Species of gastropod

Agatrix strongi is a species of sea snail, a marine gastropod mollusk in the family Cancellariidae, the nutmeg snails.
