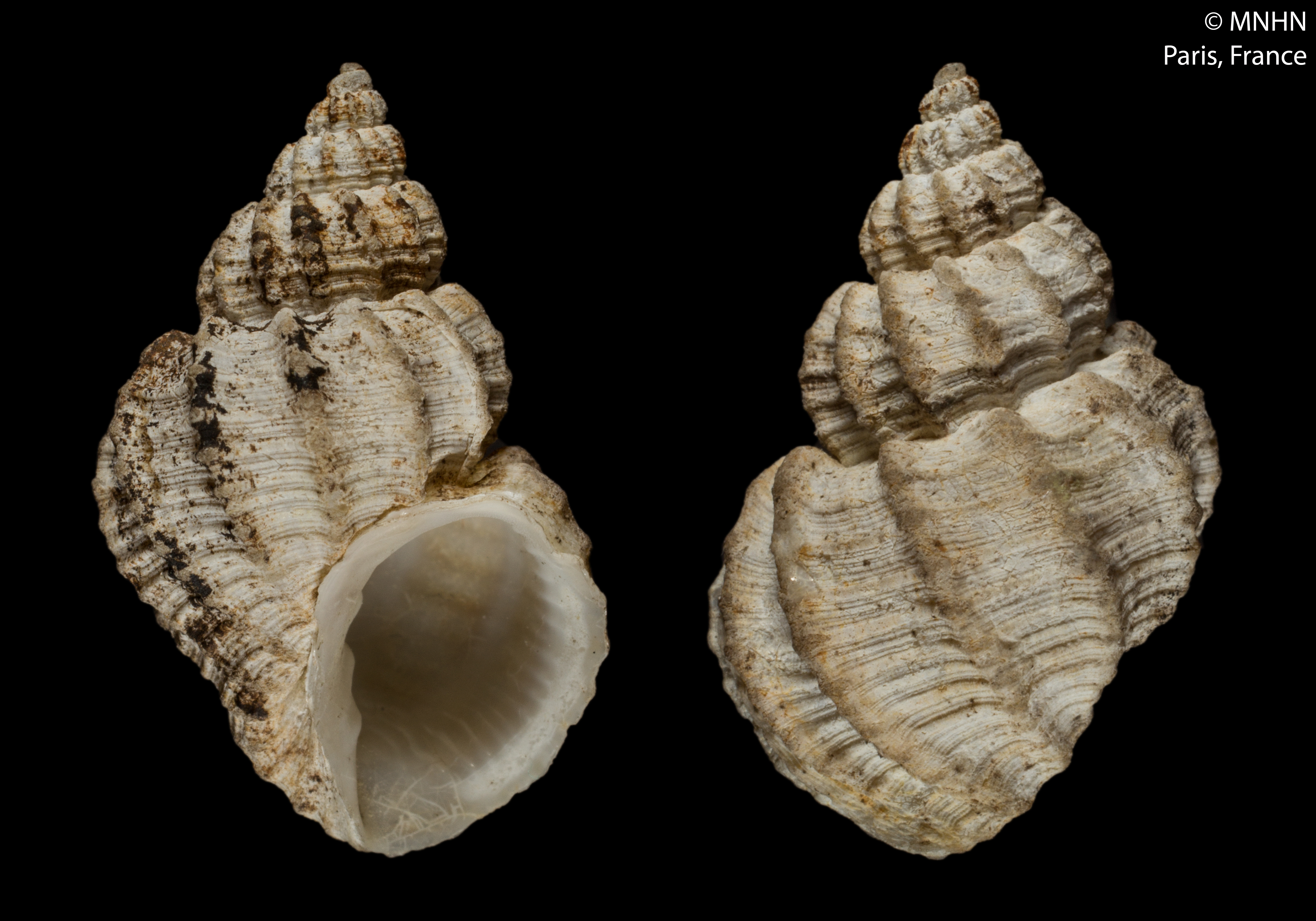
- Shell of Nipponaphera agastor (holotype at MNHN, Paris)

Scientific classification
- Kingdom: Animalia
- Phylum: Mollusca
- Class: Gastropoda
- Subclass: Caenogastropoda
- Order: Neogastropoda
- Family: Cancellariidae
- Genus: Nipponaphera
- Species: N. agastor

Binomial name
- Nipponaphera agastor Bouchet & Petit, 2008

= Nipponaphera agastor =

Species of gastropod

Nipponaphera agastor is a species of sea snail, a marine gastropod mollusk in the family Cancellariidae, the nutmeg snails. N. agastor was first identified in 2008.

== Description ==
=== External Shell and Structure ===
The length of the shell ranges from 12.2-19.5 mm. The specimens found near Tonga are notably smaller, nearing the lower end of the range. The specimens found near the Solomon Islands range from 16.8 mm to the highest of the range at 19.5mm.

The teleoconch has four rounded whorls, and the protoconch 0.9 whorls. The structure of the shell has evenly spaced axial ribs, with eleven axial ribs on the last whorl and eleven ribs on the penultimate whorl. The spiral cords are also evenly spaced, with eight cords on the penultimate whorl and thirteen on the last whorl.

=== Live Snail ===
N. agastor has lens eyes.

== Distribution and Habitat ==
This marine species occurs off the coasts of Guadalcanal Island of the Solomon Islands, The Philippines, Vanuatu, and Tonga. N. agastor is a marine benthic snail that lives in waters 100-360 meters deep.

== Behavior ==
=== Diet ===
This species is a predator, possibly parasitic like other members of Cancellariidae, which are suctorial feeders.

=== Reproduction ===
N. agastor reproduces sexually.

=== Locomotion ===
N. agastor utilizes mucus mediated gliding.
