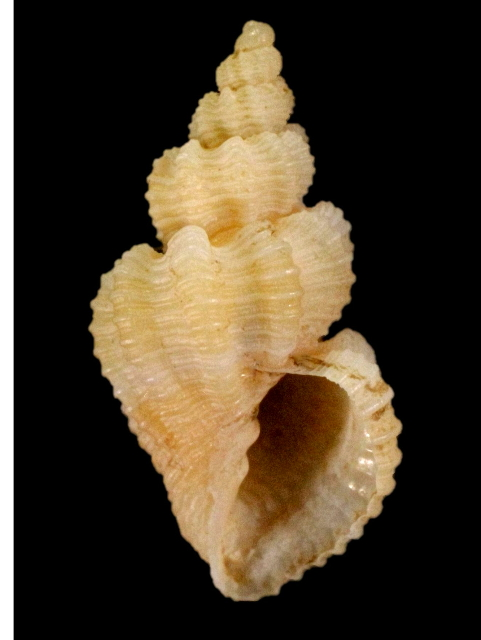
- Shell of Axelella scalatella (specimen at Naturalis Biodiversity Center)

Scientific classification
- Kingdom: Animalia
- Phylum: Mollusca
- Class: Gastropoda
- Subclass: Caenogastropoda
- Order: Neogastropoda
- Family: Cancellariidae
- Genus: Axelella
- Species: A. scalatella

Binomial name
- Axelella scalatella (Guppy, 1873)

Synonyms
- † Cancellaria scalatella Guppy, 1873 superseded combination

= Axelella scalatella =

Species of gastropod

Axelella scalatella is a species of sea snail, a marine gastropod mollusc in the family Cancellariidae, the nutmeg snails.

== Description ==
(Original description) The shell is turreted, umbilicate, and spirally striate. It is covered by numerous close-set spiral threads that become more elevated as they pass over the stout, rounded, longitudinal variciform ridges, of which there are six or seven on each whorl. The suture is very deeply sunk. There are about seven whorls, which are slightly rounded, angulate, and crowned above by the prominent ridges.

The aperture is almost triangular in shape; it is rounded above, but becomes angular and forms an obsolete siphonal canal anteriorly. The outer lip is sharp and distinctly grooved within. The inner lip is continuous, thin, and sharp; it is slightly reflected and bears two folds. The base of the shell is angulate and is perforated by a small, round umbilicus.

== Distribution ==
This species occurs in the Caribbean Sea off Jamaica (also as a fossil), Suriname and Panama.
