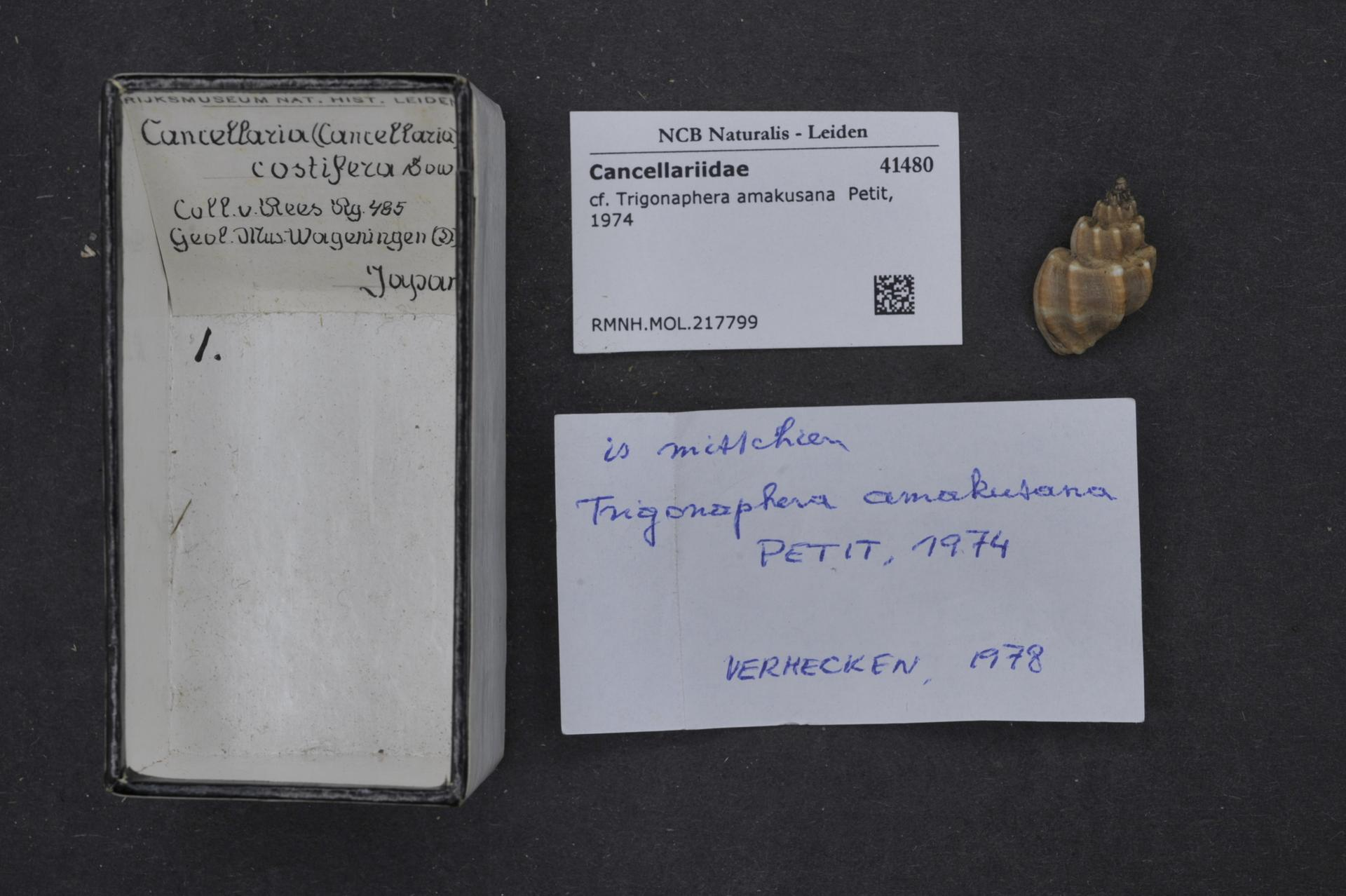

Scientific classification
- Kingdom: Animalia
- Phylum: Mollusca
- Class: Gastropoda
- Subclass: Caenogastropoda
- Order: Neogastropoda
- Family: Cancellariidae
- Genus: Trigonaphera
- Species: T. amakusana

Binomial name
- Trigonaphera amakusana Petit, 1974

= Trigonaphera amakusana =

Species of gastropod

Trigonaphera amakusana is a species of sea snail, a marine gastropod mollusk in the family Cancellariidae, the nutmeg snails.
