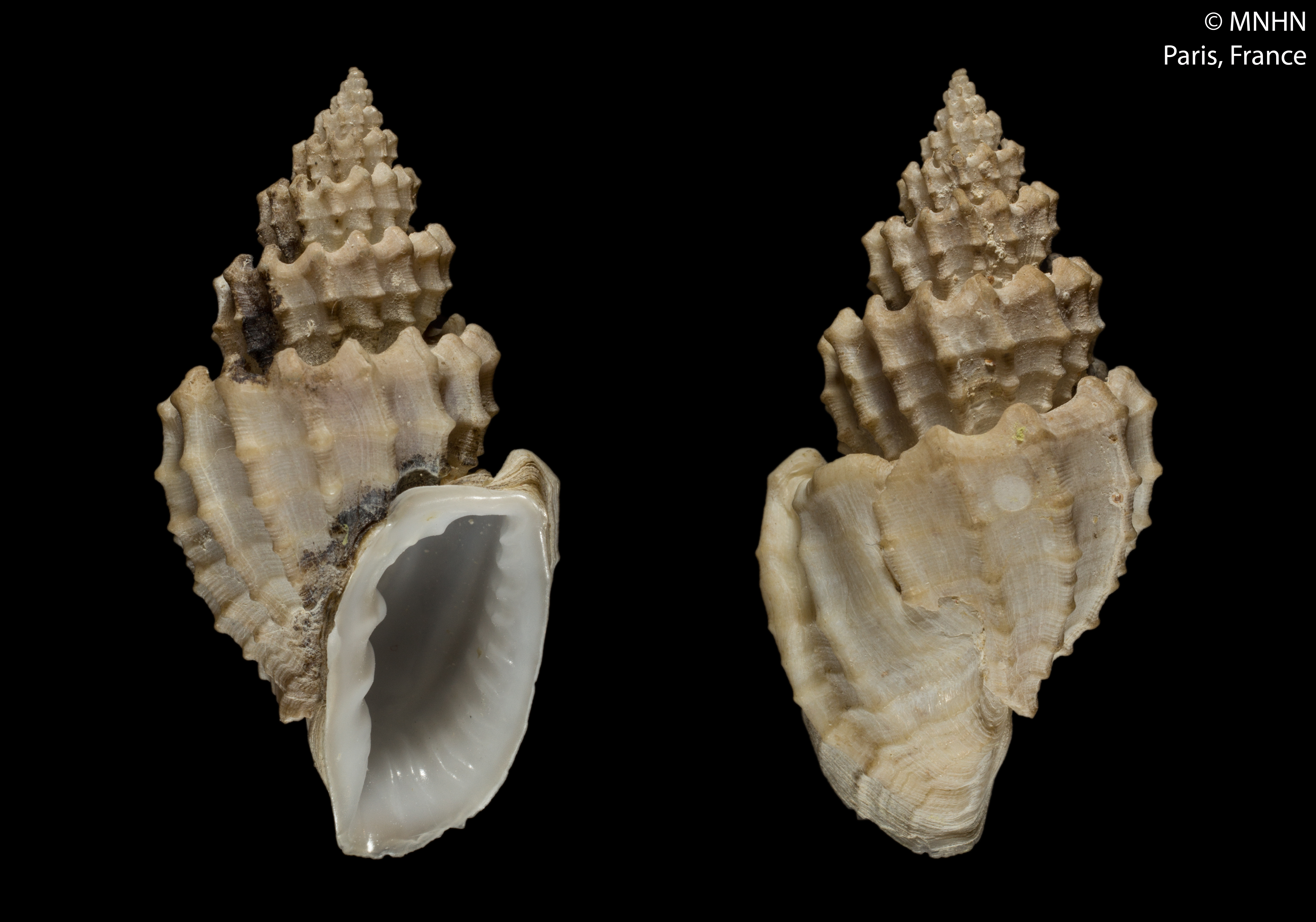
- Shell of Mirandaphera cayrei (holotype at MNHN, Paris)

Scientific classification
- Kingdom: Animalia
- Phylum: Mollusca
- Class: Gastropoda
- Subclass: Caenogastropoda
- Order: Neogastropoda
- Family: Cancellariidae
- Genus: Mirandaphera
- Species: M. cayrei

Binomial name
- Mirandaphera cayrei Bouchet & Petit, 2002

= Mirandaphera cayrei =

Species of sea snail

Mirandaphera cayrei is a species of sea snail, a marine gastropod mollusc in the family Cancellariidae, the nutmeg snails.

== Distribution ==
This marine species occurs off New Caledonia.
