= Agatrix agassizii =

Scientific classification
- Kingdom: Animalia
- Phylum: Mollusca
- Class: Gastropoda
- Subclass: Caenogastropoda
- Order: Neogastropoda
- Family: Cancellariidae
- Genus: Agatrix
- Species: A. agassizii

Binomial name
- Agatrix agassizii (Dall, 1889a)

Synonyms
- Cancellaria agassizii Dall, 1889a

Species of gastropod

Agatrix agassizii is a species of sea snail, a marine gastropod mollusc in the family Cancellariidae, the nutmeg snails.
