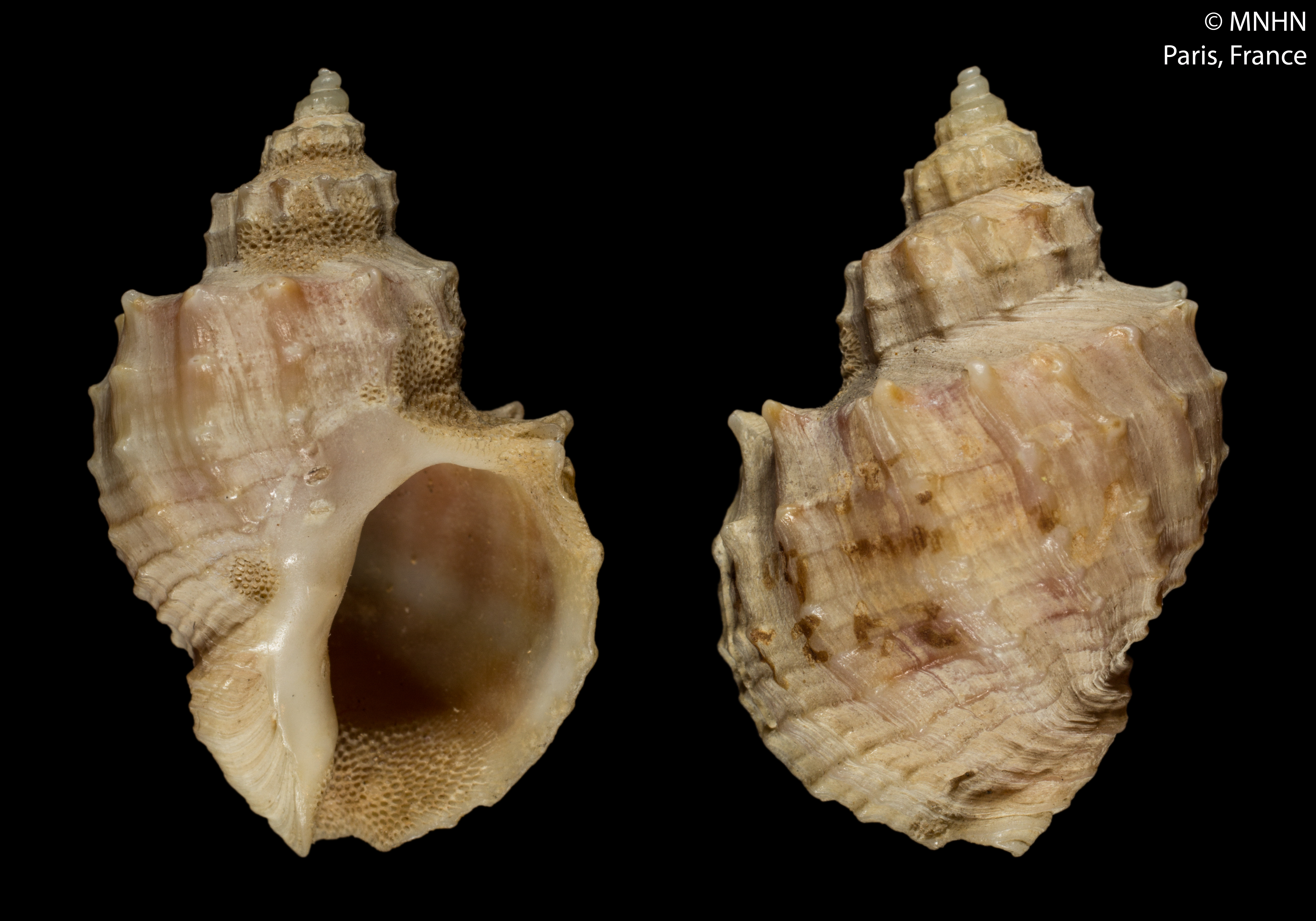
- Shell of Solatia piscatoria (lectotype at MNHN, Paris)

Scientific classification
- Kingdom: Animalia
- Phylum: Mollusca
- Class: Gastropoda
- Subclass: Caenogastropoda
- Order: Neogastropoda
- Family: Cancellariidae
- Genus: Solatia
- Species: S. piscatoria

Binomial name
- Solatia piscatoria (Gmelin, 1791)

Synonyms
- Buccinum piscatorium Gmelin, 1791; Cancellaria brocchii Crosse, 1861; Cancellaria nodulosa Lamarck, 1822; Cancellaria piscatoria (Gmelin, 1791); Cancellaria piscatoria minor Pallary, 1920; Murex semilunaris Gmelin, 1791; Solatia solat Jousseaume, 1887

= Solatia piscatoria =

Species of gastropod

Solatia piscatoria is a species of sea snail, a marine gastropod mollusk in the family Cancellariidae, the nutmeg snails.

== Description ==
The length of the shell attains 20.1 mm.

== Distribution ==
This marine species occurs off Mauretania.
