= Nipponaphera wallacei =

Scientific classification
- Kingdom: Animalia
- Phylum: Mollusca
- Class: Gastropoda
- Subclass: Caenogastropoda
- Order: Neogastropoda
- Family: Cancellariidae
- Genus: Nipponaphera
- Species: N. wallacei

Binomial name
- Nipponaphera wallacei Petit & Harasewych, 2000

Species of gastropod

Nipponaphera wallacei is a species of sea snail, a marine gastropod mollusk in the family Cancellariidae, the nutmeg snails.

The specific name wallacei is in honor of Mr. Martin Wallace, who collected type specimens.

== Distribution ==
South Africa
