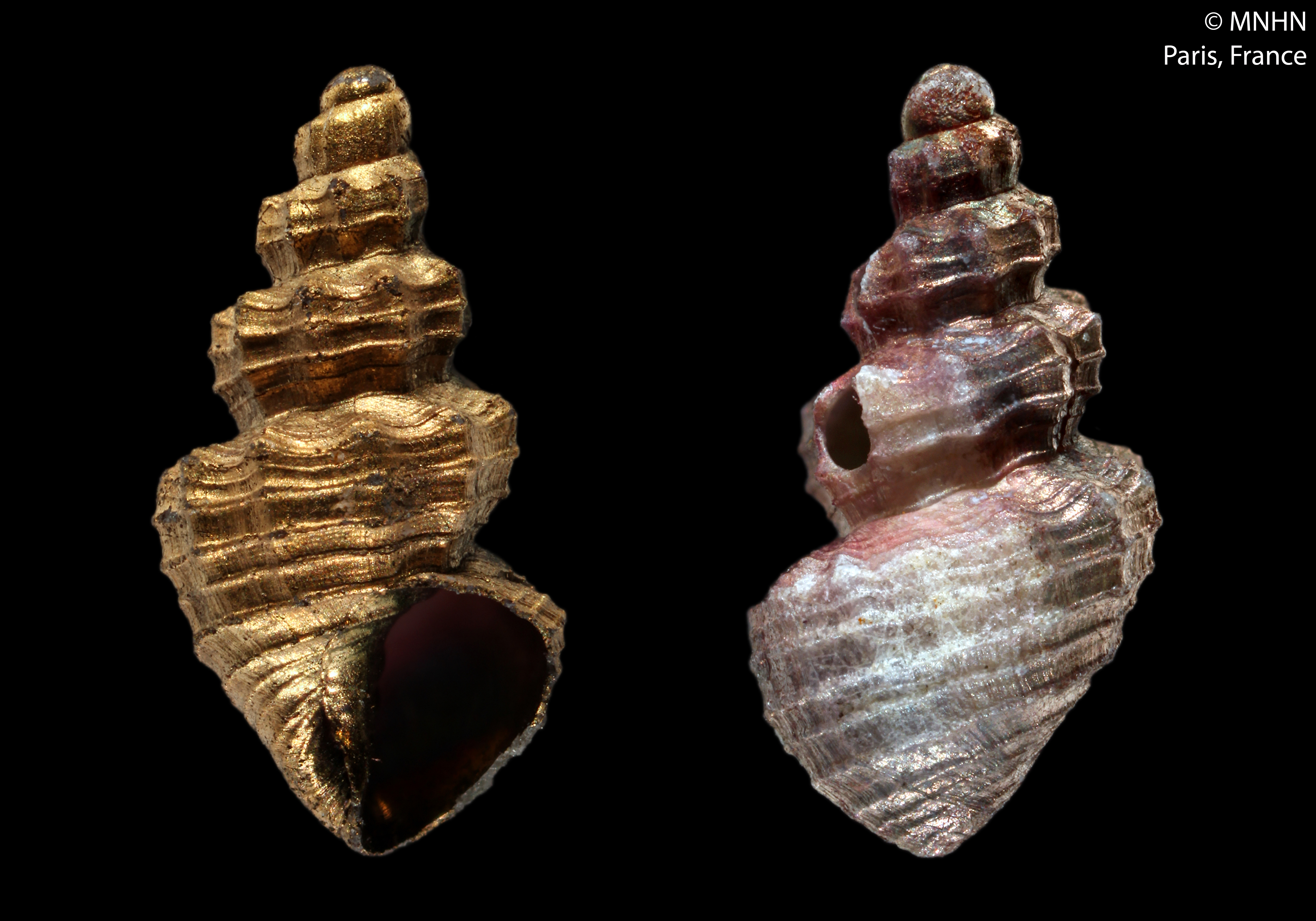
- Shell of Microcancilla brasiliensis (holotype at MNHN, Paris)

Scientific classification
- Kingdom: Animalia
- Phylum: Mollusca
- Class: Gastropoda
- Subclass: Caenogastropoda
- Order: Neogastropoda
- Superfamily: Volutoidea
- Family: Cancellariidae
- Genus: Microcancilla; Dall, 1924

Type species
- Cancellaria microscopica Dall, 1889

= Microcancilla =

Genus of gastropods

Microcancilla is a genus of sea snails, marine gastropod mollusks in the subfamily Admetinae of the family Cancellariidae, the nutmeg snails.

== Species ==
Species within the genus Microcancilla include:

- Microcancilla brasiliensis (Verhecken, 1991)
- Microcancilla jonasi de Barros & Petit, 2007
- Microcancilla microscopica (Dall, 1889)
- Microcancilla phoenix Souza, Pimenta & Miyaji, 2021
