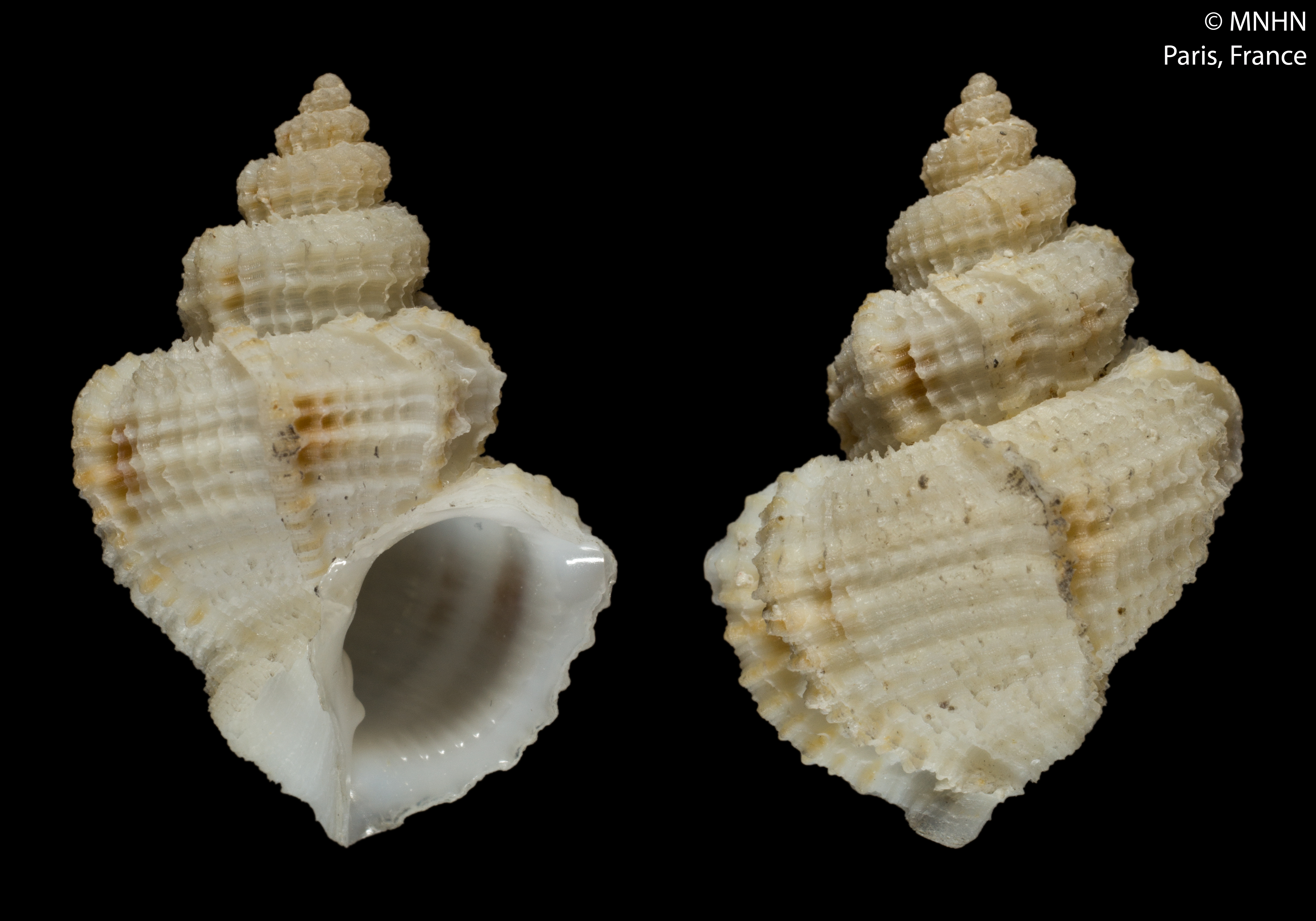
- Shell of Nipponaphera pardalis (holotype at MNHN, Paris)

Scientific classification
- Kingdom: Animalia
- Phylum: Mollusca
- Class: Gastropoda
- Subclass: Caenogastropoda
- Order: Neogastropoda
- Family: Cancellariidae
- Genus: Nipponaphera
- Species: N. pardalis

Binomial name
- Nipponaphera pardalis Bouchet & Petit, 2002

= Nipponaphera pardalis =

Species of gastropod

Nipponaphera pardalis is a species of sea snail, a marine gastropod mollusk in the family Cancellariidae, the nutmeg snails.

== Description ==
The length of the shell attains 25.4 mm.

== Distribution ==
This marine species occurs off New Caledonia.
