= Agatrix epomis =

Scientific classification
- Kingdom: Animalia
- Phylum: Mollusca
- Class: Gastropoda
- Subclass: Caenogastropoda
- Order: Neogastropoda
- Family: Cancellariidae
- Genus: Agatrix
- Species: A. epomis

Binomial name
- Agatrix epomis (Woodring, 1928)

Species of gastropod

Agatrix epomis is a species of sea snail, a marine gastropod mollusk in the family Cancellariidae, the nutmeg snails.
