= Tribia coronata =

Scientific classification
- Kingdom: Animalia
- Phylum: Mollusca
- Class: Gastropoda
- Subclass: Caenogastropoda
- Order: Neogastropoda
- Family: Cancellariidae
- Genus: Tribia
- Species: T. coronata

Binomial name
- Tribia coronata (Scacchi, 1835)

Synonyms
- Cancellaria coronata Scacchi, 1835; Cancellaria taeniata Sowerby, G.B. II, 1849; Narona coronata (Scacchi, 1835)

Species of gastropod

Tribia coronata, previously known as Cancellaria coronata, is a species of sea snail, a marine gastropod mollusk in the family Cancellariidae, the nutmeg snails. The first fossils of T. coronata are dated from the early Pleistocene epoch.

== Description ==
The shell size varies between 10-20 mm in total length. The color is solid, either white or brown.

=== External Shell and Structure ===
T. coronata is described originally by Scacchi (as C. coronata) in 1836 as,

"Shell ovate-oblong; seven openings, decorated with longitudinal ribs and transverse striations, near the sutures angled and crowned with costal tips; columella biplicated, subumbilicated; upper lip angled, striated inside; height lin: 8. You can easily recognize this chancellery by the angle that each turn of its spire has superiorly near the commissures, and for the longitudinal ribs which where they touch the angle are prolonged in many elevated points, which like a crown surround the upper part of the recesses. These, in addition to the longitudinal ribs, are adorned with thin transverse striae, and in the part that remains between the angle and the commissure, the ribs continue in many small folds and the transverse striae are missing. The opening is grooved below, the right lip is angular above and striated on the internal surface, the column has two internal folds, has a small umbilicus on the outside and is adorned with oblique striae." (Translated from Latin).

The species is later described in Bollettino malacologico in 2007 as,

"Shell robust, medium-small in size and slender in shape. Protoconch smooth paucispiral, composed of 1.5 whorls, with a very large nucleus and shallow sutures. The beginning of the teleoconch is marked by the appearance of strong, acute, and narrow ribs, fourteen in the first whorl, traversed by a few very faint spiral cords, visible only in the interspaces. Teleoconch formed by four keeled whorls, equipped with a flat, slightly inclined sutural ramp decorated with fifteen to sixteen narrow, slightly inclined, regularly spaced axial ribs, which extend obliquely along the ramp. And which, extending beyond the keel, form a sort of crown. Fine spiral sculpture present in the interspaces, composed of a few spiral threads (four on the penultimate whorl) that are barely visible. Last whorl subtriangular, comprising about two-thirds of the shell height, traversed by approximately fifteen narrow ribs. Aperture subtriangular, expanded in the posterior region. Outer lip thin, straight in the anterior part, smooth internally. Columellar lip straight, with two very distinct, subparallel columellar folds. Siphonal canal narrow, not very long, sub-straight. Columellar callus not very extensive; absence of a pseudo-umbilical slit." (Translated from Italian).

=== Living Snail ===
T. coronata has lens eyes.

== Distribution and Habitat ==
This species is found in the Mediterranean Sea. It is a marine benthic snail that resides in subtropical waters between 30 and 220 meters deep.

== Behavior ==
=== Diet ===
T. coronata is a predator and a carnivorous species.

=== Reproduction ===
This species reproduces by sexual reproduction.

=== Locomotion ===
T. coronata moves by mucus mediated gliding.
