= Nipponaphera teramachii =

Scientific classification
- Kingdom: Animalia
- Phylum: Mollusca
- Class: Gastropoda
- Subclass: Caenogastropoda
- Order: Neogastropoda
- Family: Cancellariidae
- Genus: Nipponaphera
- Species: N. teramachii

Binomial name
- Nipponaphera teramachii (Habe, 1961a)

Synonyms
- Trigonaphera teramachii Habe, 1961a

Species of gastropod

Nipponaphera teramachii is a species of sea snail, a marine gastropod mollusk in the family Cancellariidae, the nutmeg snails.
