= Nipponaphera suduirauti =

Scientific classification
- Kingdom: Animalia
- Phylum: Mollusca
- Class: Gastropoda
- Subclass: Caenogastropoda
- Order: Neogastropoda
- Family: Cancellariidae
- Genus: Nipponaphera
- Species: N. suduirauti

Binomial name
- Nipponaphera suduirauti (Verhecken, 1999)

Synonyms
- Axelella suduirauti Verhecken, 1999

Species of gastropod

Nipponaphera suduirauti is a species of sea snail, a marine gastropod mollusk in the family Cancellariidae, the nutmeg snails.
