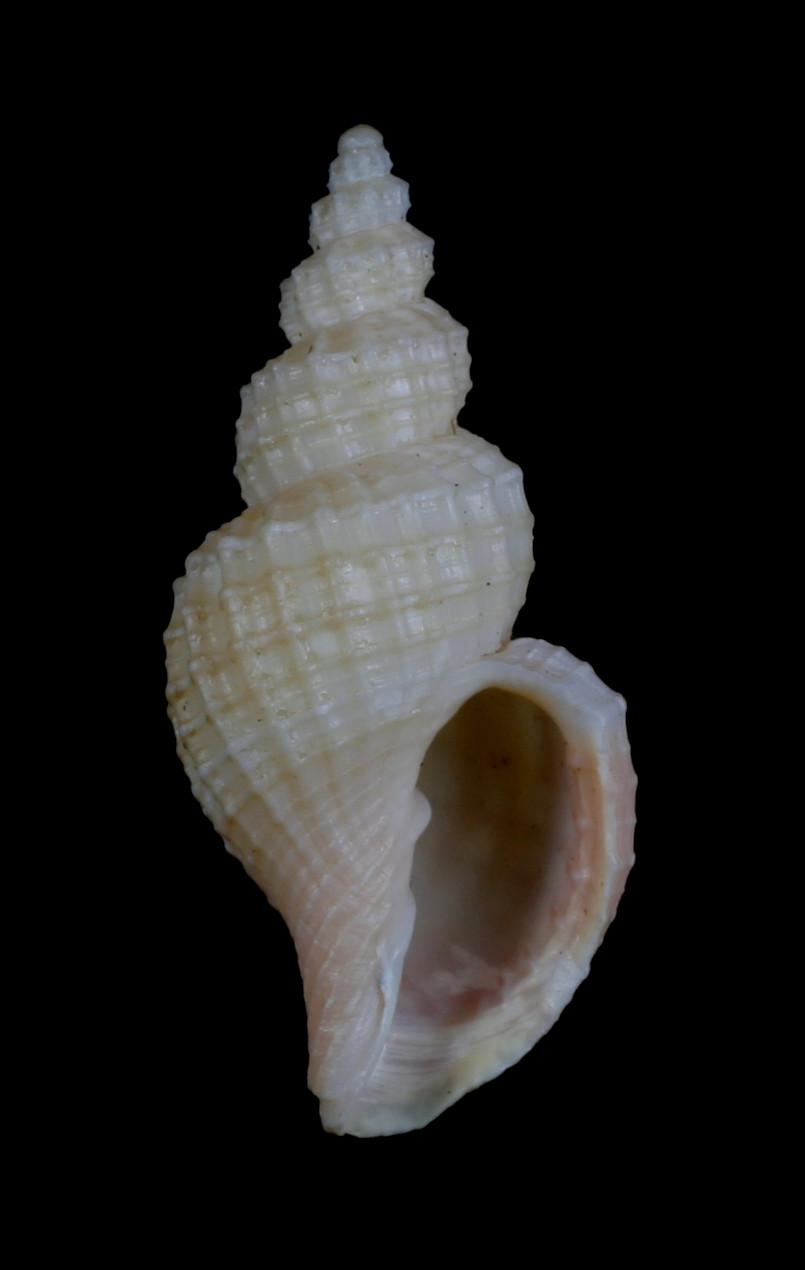
- Apertural view of shell of Narona exopleura (Dall, 1908)

Scientific classification
- Kingdom: Animalia
- Phylum: Mollusca
- Class: Gastropoda
- Subclass: Caenogastropoda
- Order: Neogastropoda
- Family: Cancellariidae
- Genus: Narona
- Species: N. exopleura

Binomial name
- Narona exopleura (Dall, 1908)

Synonyms
- Cancellaria exopleura Dall, 1908

= Narona exopleura =

Species of gastropod

Narona exopleura is a species of sea snail, a marine gastropod mollusk in the family Cancellariidae, the nutmeg snails.
