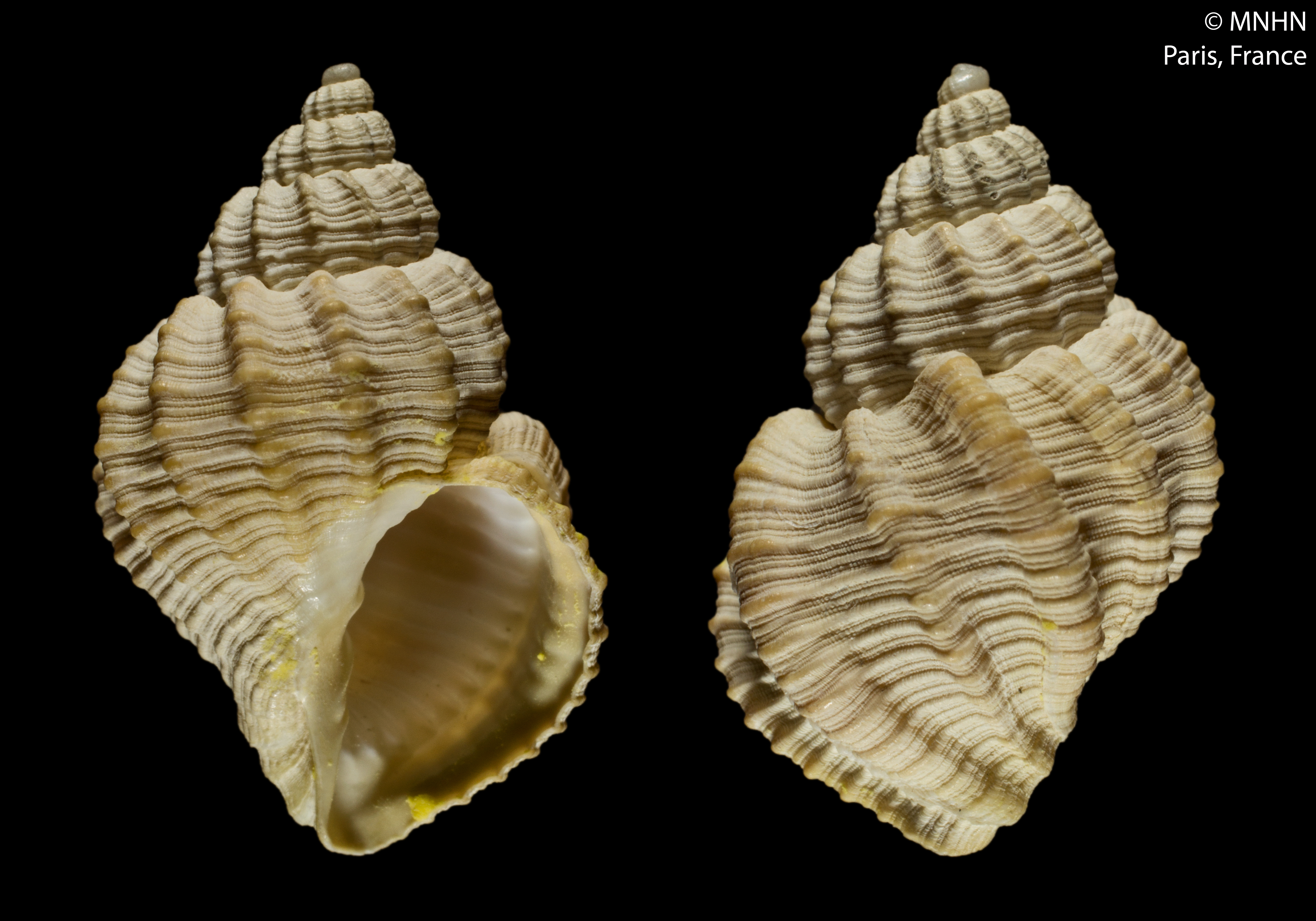
- Shell of Nipponaphera kastoroae (holotype at MNHN, Paris)

Scientific classification
- Kingdom: Animalia
- Phylum: Mollusca
- Class: Gastropoda
- Subclass: Caenogastropoda
- Order: Neogastropoda
- Family: Cancellariidae
- Genus: Nipponaphera
- Species: N. kastoroae

Binomial name
- Nipponaphera kastoroae (Verhecken, 1997)

Synonyms
- Axelella kastoroae Verhecken, 1997

= Nipponaphera kastoroae =

Species of gastropod

Nipponaphera kastoroae is a species of sea snail, a marine gastropod mollusk in the family Cancellariidae, the nutmeg snails.

== Distribution ==
This marine species occurs off Indonesia.
