= Mirandaphera tosaensis =

Scientific classification
- Kingdom: Animalia
- Phylum: Mollusca
- Class: Gastropoda
- Subclass: Caenogastropoda
- Order: Neogastropoda
- Family: Cancellariidae
- Genus: Mirandaphera
- Species: M. tosaensis

Binomial name
- Mirandaphera tosaensis (Habe, 1961)

Synonyms
- Trigonaphera tosaensis Habe, 1961a

Species of gastropod

Mirandaphera tosaensis is a species of sea snail, a marine gastropod mollusc in the family Cancellariidae, the nutmeg snails.
