= Pseudobabylonella minima =

Scientific classification
- Kingdom: Animalia
- Phylum: Mollusca
- Class: Gastropoda
- Subclass: Caenogastropoda
- Order: Neogastropoda
- Family: Cancellariidae
- Genus: Pseudobabylonella
- Species: P. minima

Binomial name
- Pseudobabylonella minima (Reeve, 1856)

Synonyms
- Axelella minima (Reeve, 1856) (currently placed in genus Pseudobabylonella); Cancellaria minima Reeve, 1856 (basionym); Sveltella minima Nordsieck 1968; Narona minima Gubbioli & Nofroni 1985; Olssonella minima Bouchet & Warén 1985

Species of gastropod

Pseudobabylonella minima is a species of sea snail, a marine gastropod mollusc in the family Cancellariidae, the nutmeg snails.

== Description ==
The size of the small, fusiform shell varies between 5 mm and 9 mm. It has a white to pale brown color. The paucispiral protoconch has an elaborate sculpture that is different from the teleoconch. This teleoconch has up to five whorls with broad round, spiral ridges (between 2 and 11), crossed by 8 to 14 rounded, axial ribs. The sutures are deeply impressed. The aperture is elongately ovoid with only a faint siphonal canal. The thin outer lip has no inner lirae. The umbilicus is closed or sometimes with a narrow slit.

== Distribution ==
This species is found along Southwest Spain, Gibraltar, the Azores, the Canaries, Madeira (very common), Morocco, the Western Sahara and Mauritania.
