= Nipponaphera semipellucida =

Scientific classification
- Kingdom: Animalia
- Phylum: Mollusca
- Class: Gastropoda
- Subclass: Caenogastropoda
- Order: Neogastropoda
- Family: Cancellariidae
- Genus: Nipponaphera
- Species: N. semipellucida

Binomial name
- Nipponaphera semipellucida (A. Adams & Reeve, 1850)

Synonyms
- Cancellaria semipellucida Adams & Reeve, 1850; Axelella semipellucida (A. Adams & Reeve, 1850)

Species of gastropod

Nipponaphera semipellucida is a species of sea snail, a marine gastropod mollusk in the family Cancellariidae, the nutmeg snails.
