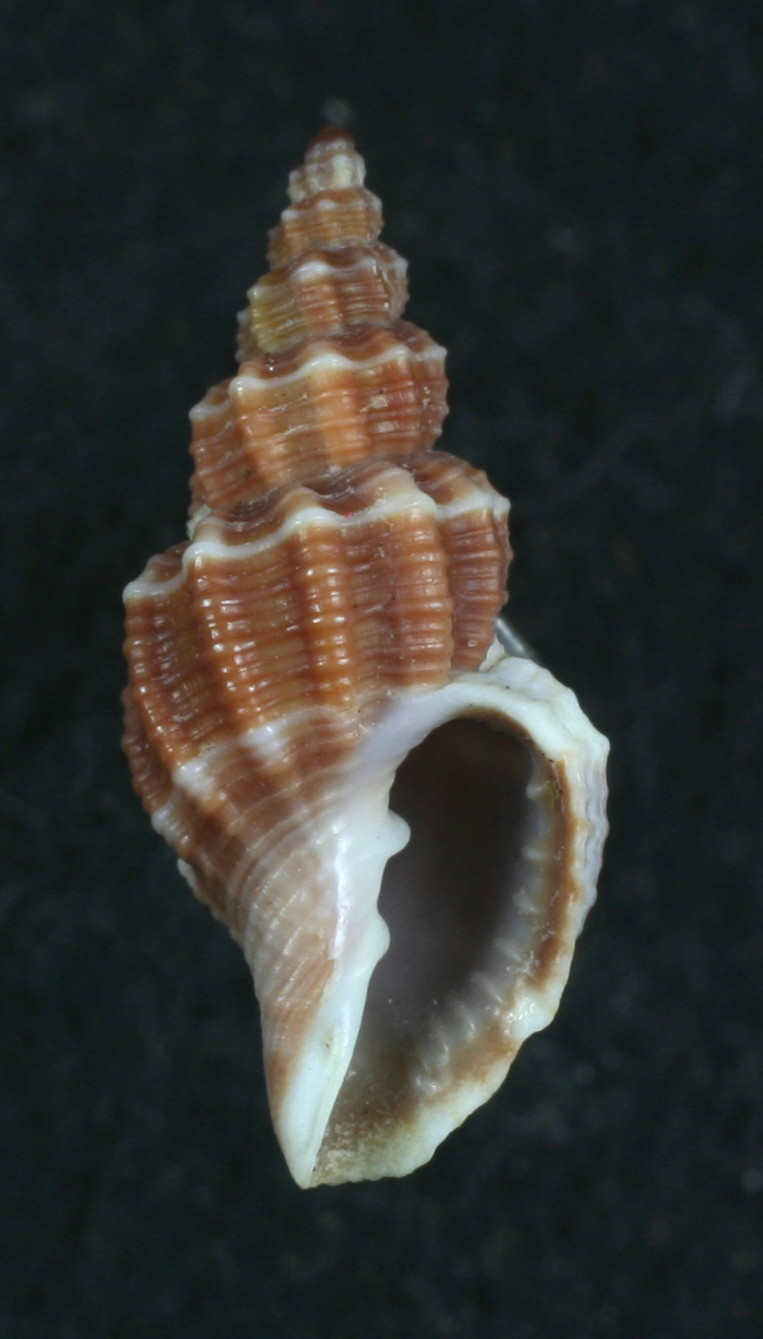
- Apertural view of shell of Narona clavatula (Sowerby, 1832)

Scientific classification
- Kingdom: Animalia
- Phylum: Mollusca
- Class: Gastropoda
- Subclass: Caenogastropoda
- Order: Neogastropoda
- Family: Cancellariidae
- Genus: Narona
- Species: N. clavatula

Binomial name
- Narona clavatula (G.B. Sowerby I, 1832)

Synonyms
- Cancellaria clavatula G.B. Sowerby I, 1832a; Narona hidalgoi Jousseaume, 1887; Panarona clavatula (G. B. Sowerby I, 1832)

= Narona clavatula =

Species of gastropod

Narona clavatula is a species of sea snail, a marine gastropod mollusk in the family Cancellariidae, the nutmeg snails.

== Description ==
The length of the shell attains 13.5 mm.
