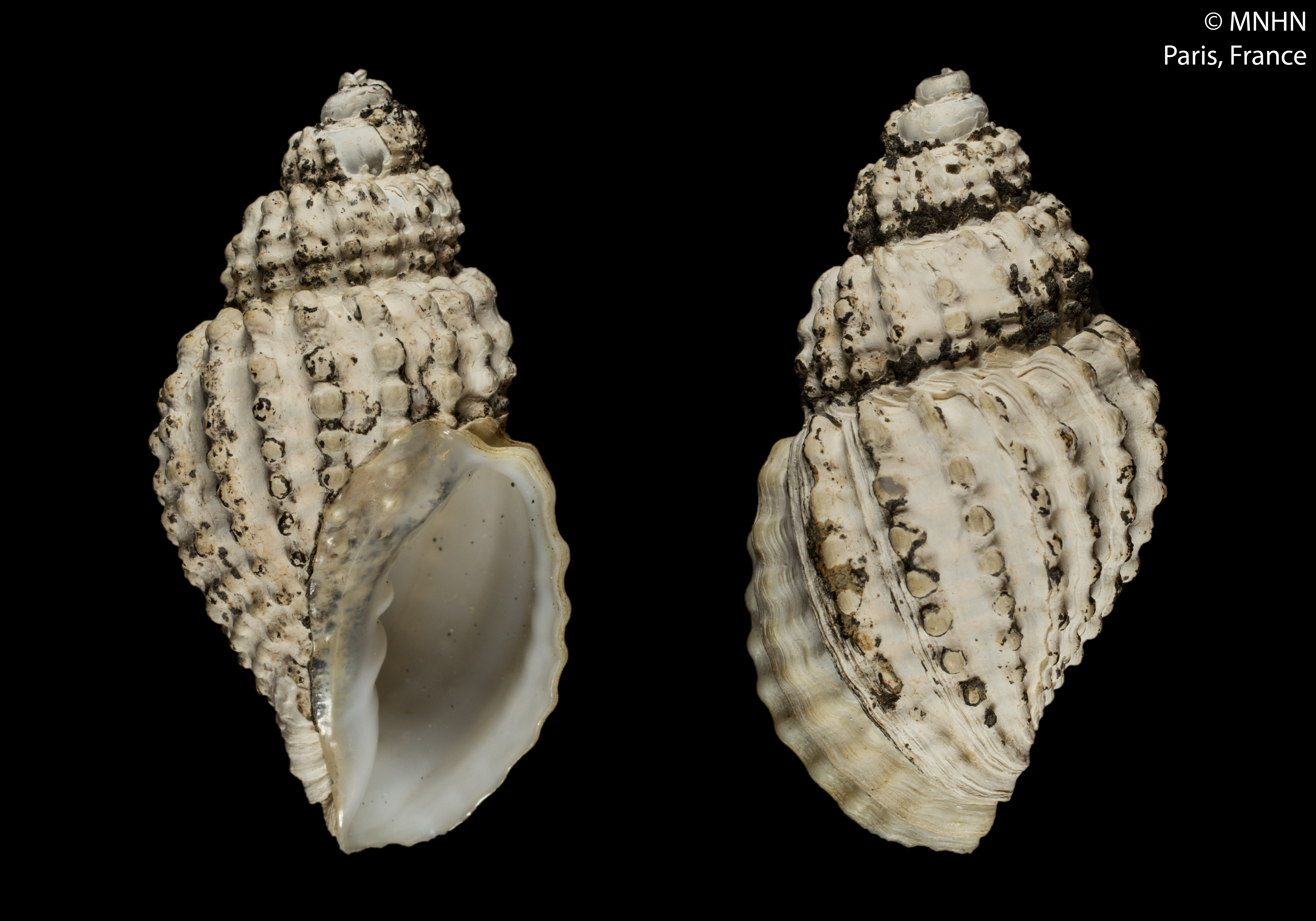
- Shell of Mirandaphera arafurensis (holotype at MNHN, Paris)

Scientific classification
- Kingdom: Animalia
- Phylum: Mollusca
- Class: Gastropoda
- Subclass: Caenogastropoda
- Order: Neogastropoda
- Family: Cancellariidae
- Genus: Mirandaphera
- Species: M. arafurensis

Binomial name
- Mirandaphera arafurensis (Verhecken, 1997)

Synonyms
- Solatia arafurensis Verhecken, 1997

= Mirandaphera arafurensis =

Species of gastropod

Mirandaphera arafurensis is a species of sea snail, a marine gastropod mollusc in the family Cancellariidae, the nutmeg snails.
