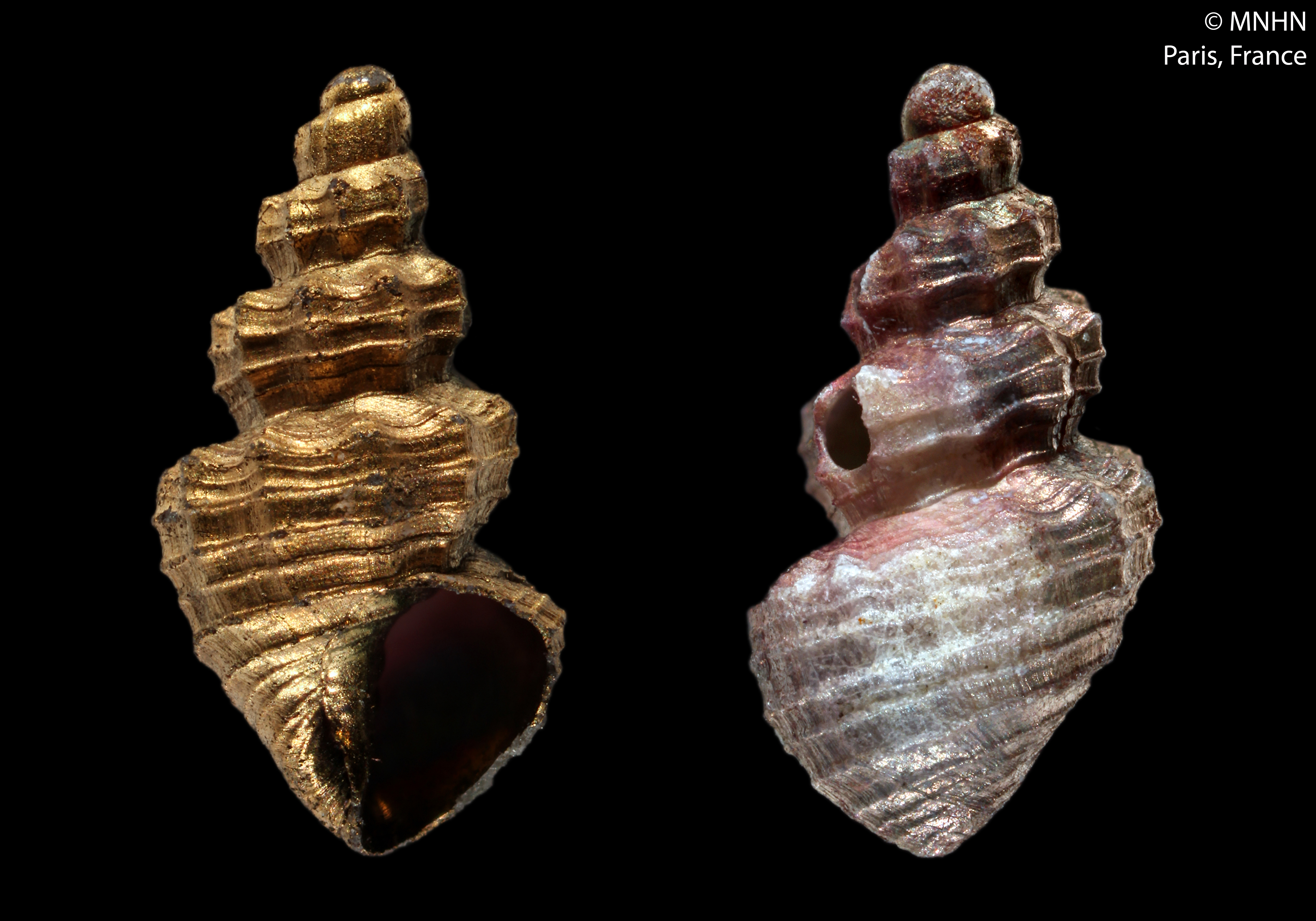
- Shell of Microcancilla brasiliensis (holotype at MNHN, Paris)

Scientific classification
- Kingdom: Animalia
- Phylum: Mollusca
- Class: Gastropoda
- Subclass: Caenogastropoda
- Order: Neogastropoda
- Family: Cancellariidae
- Genus: Microcancilla
- Species: M. brasiliensis

Binomial name
- Microcancilla brasiliensis (Verhecken, 1991)

Synonyms
- Axelella brasiliensis Verhecken, 1991 (basionym); Pseudobabylonella brasiliensis (Verhecken, 1991)

= Microcancilla brasiliensis =

Species of gastropod

Microcancilla brasiliensis is a species of sea snail, a marine gastropod mollusk in the family Cancellariidae, the nutmeg snails.

== Distribution ==
This marine species occurs off Brazil.
