= Nipponaphera nodosivaricosa =

Scientific classification
- Kingdom: Animalia
- Phylum: Mollusca
- Class: Gastropoda
- Subclass: Caenogastropoda
- Order: Neogastropoda
- Family: Cancellariidae
- Genus: Nipponaphera
- Species: N. nodosivaricosa

Binomial name
- Nipponaphera nodosivaricosa (Petuch, 1979)

Synonyms
- Scalptia nodosivaricosa (Petush, 1979); Agatrix nodosivaricosa Petuch, 1979; Axelella nodosivaricosa (Petush, 1979)

Species of gastropod

Nipponaphera nodosivaricosa is a species of sea snail, a marine gastropod mollusk in the family Cancellariidae, the nutmeg snails.
