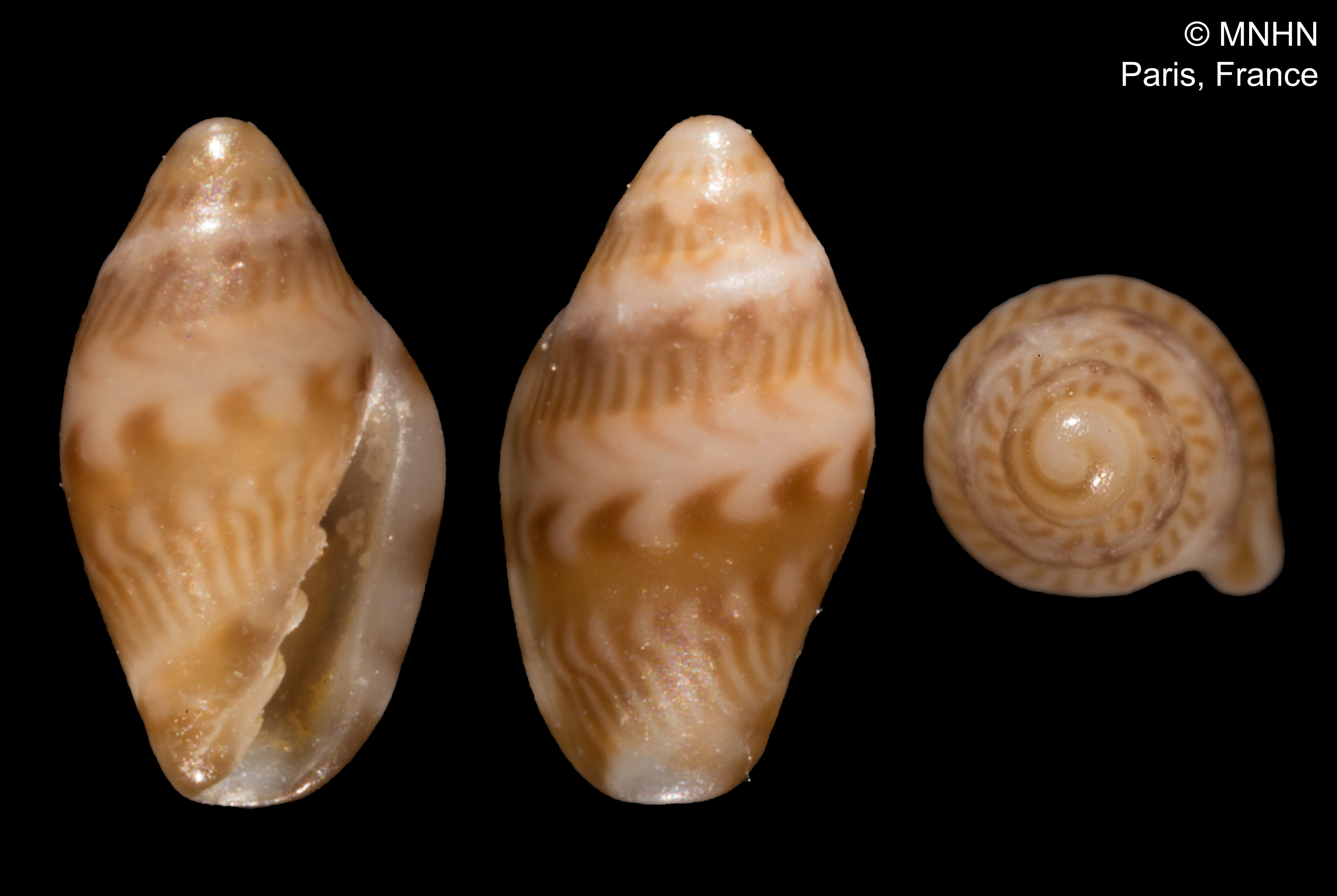
- Shell (lectotype at MNHN, Paris)

Scientific classification
- Kingdom: Animalia
- Phylum: Mollusca
- Class: Gastropoda
- Subclass: Caenogastropoda
- Order: Neogastropoda
- Family: Marginellidae
- Subfamily: Marginellinae
- Genus: Marginella
- Species: M. anna

Binomial name
- Marginella anna Jousseaume, 1881

Synonyms
- Marginella (Praeparvamarginella) anna Jousseaume, 1881· accepted, alternate representation

= Marginella anna =

Species of gastropod

Marginella anna is a species of sea snail, a marine gastropod mollusk in the family Marginellidae, the margin snails.

== Description ==
The length of the shell ranges between 2.5 and 5 mm.

== Distribution ==
This marine species occurs off Madagascar.
