= Sveltia gladiator =

Scientific classification
- Kingdom: Animalia
- Phylum: Mollusca
- Class: Gastropoda
- Subclass: Caenogastropoda
- Order: Neogastropoda
- Family: Cancellariidae
- Genus: Sveltia
- Species: S. gladiator

Binomial name
- Sveltia gladiator (Petit, 1976)

Synonyms
- Cancellaria gladiator Petit, 1976

Species of gastropod

Sveltia gladiator is a species of sea snail, a marine gastropod mollusc in the family Cancellariidae, the nutmeg snails.
