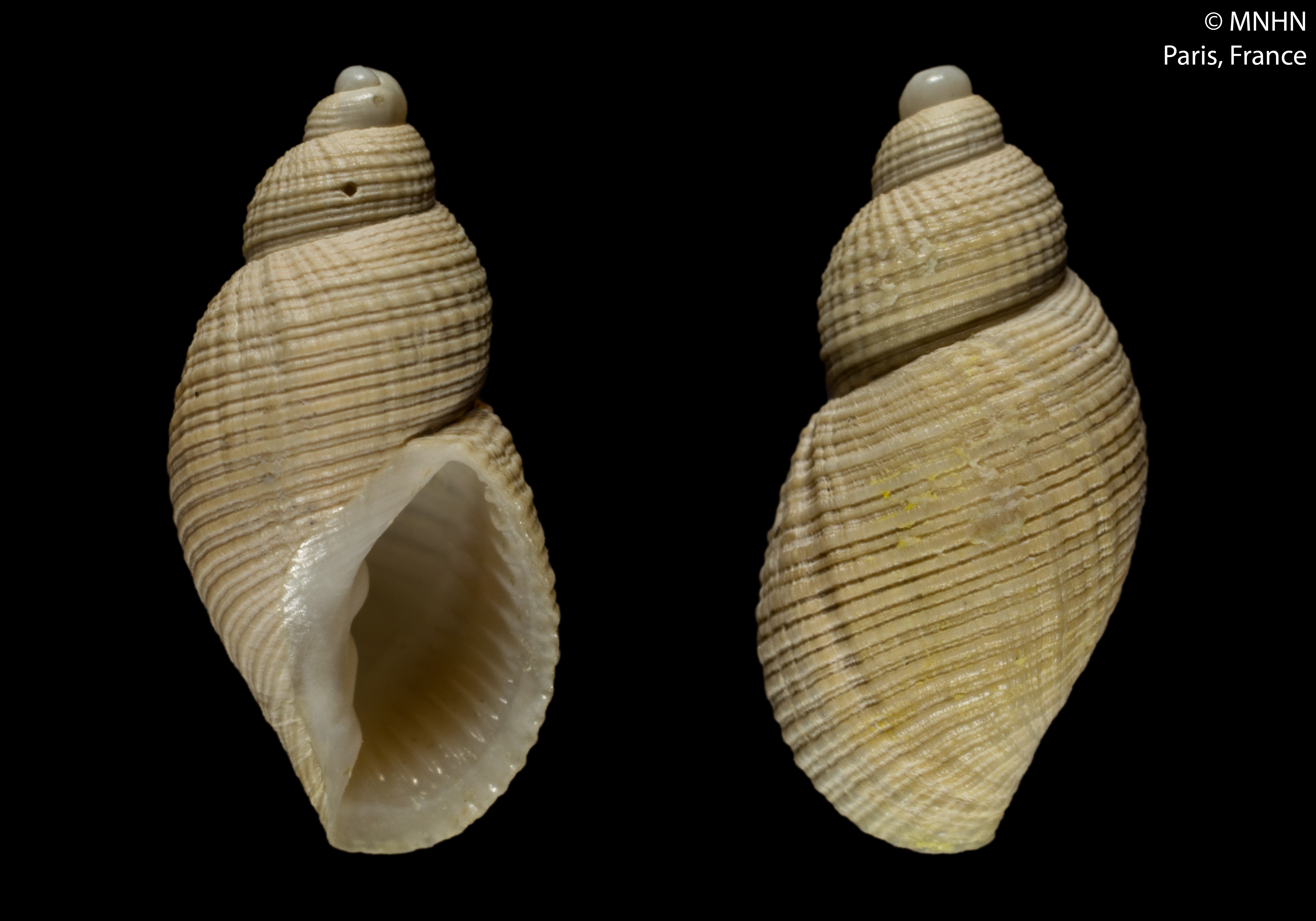
- Shell of Perplicaria boucheti (holotype at MNHN, Paris)

Scientific classification
- Kingdom: Animalia
- Phylum: Mollusca
- Class: Gastropoda
- Subclass: Caenogastropoda
- Order: Neogastropoda
- Family: Cancellariidae
- Genus: Perplicaria
- Species: P. boucheti

Binomial name
- Perplicaria boucheti Verhecken, 1997

= Perplicaria boucheti =

Species of gastropod

Perplicaria boucheti is a species of sea snail, a marine gastropod mollusk in the family Cancellariidae, the nutmeg snails.

== Distribution ==
This marine species occurs off the Tanimbar Islands, Indonesia.
