= Gibberula benguelensis =

Scientific classification
- Kingdom: Animalia
- Phylum: Mollusca
- Class: Gastropoda
- Subclass: Caenogastropoda
- Order: Neogastropoda
- Family: Cystiscidae
- Subfamily: Cystiscinae
- Genus: Gibberula
- Species: G. benguelensis

Binomial name
- Gibberula benguelensis Jousseaume, 1875

Species of gastropod

Gibberula benguelensis is a species of sea snail, a marine gastropod mollusk, in the family Cystiscidae.

== Distribution ==
This species occurs in the Southern Atlantic off Benguela, Angola.
