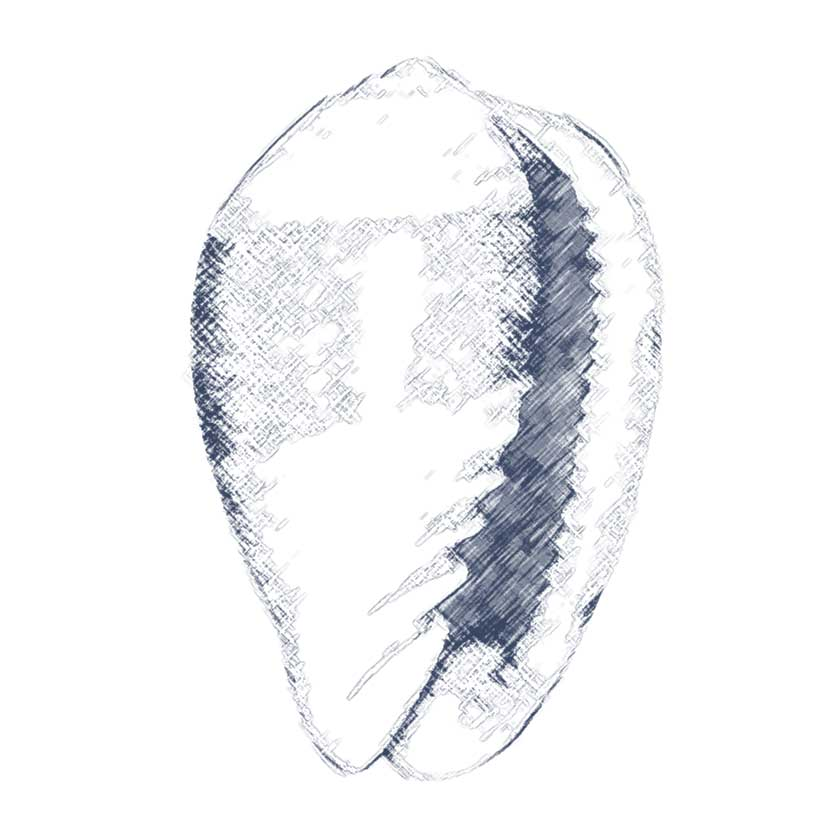
- Gibberula

Scientific classification
- Kingdom: Animalia
- Phylum: Mollusca
- Class: Gastropoda
- Subclass: Caenogastropoda
- Order: Neogastropoda
- Family: Cystiscidae
- Subfamily: Cystiscinae
- Genus: Gibberula
- Species: G. oryza

Binomial name
- Gibberula oryza (Lamarck, 1822)

Synonyms
- Peribolus stipon Jousseaume, 1875; Volvaria oryza Lamarck, 1822

= Gibberula oryza =

Species of gastropod

Gibberula oryza is a species of very small sea snail, a marine gastropod mollusk or micromollusk in the family Cystiscidae. It is considered a delicacy for those of various cultures in the Philippines.
