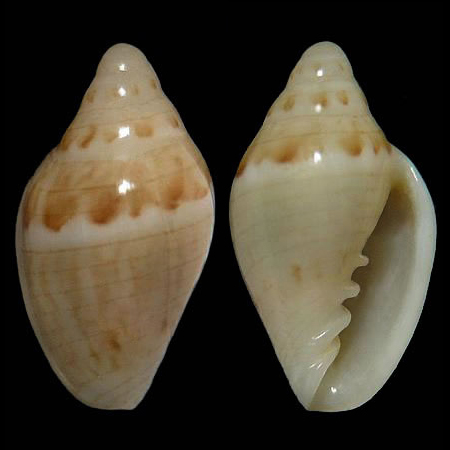
- Apertural (right) and abapertural (left) views of a shell of M. gloriosa

Scientific classification
- Kingdom: Animalia
- Phylum: Mollusca
- Class: Gastropoda
- Subclass: Caenogastropoda
- Order: Neogastropoda
- Family: Marginellidae
- Subfamily: Marginellinae
- Genus: Marginella
- Species: M. gloriosa

Binomial name
- Marginella gloriosa Jousseaume, 1884

Synonyms
- Marginella (Afriamarginella) gloriosa Jousseaume, 1884· accepted, alternate representation

= Marginella gloriosa =

Species of gastropod

Marginella gloriosa is a species of sea snail, a marine gastropod mollusk in the family Marginellidae, the margin snails.

== Distribution ==
This marine species occurs off Western Africa.
