= Loxotaphrus deshayesii =

Scientific classification
- Kingdom: Animalia
- Phylum: Mollusca
- Class: Gastropoda
- Subclass: Caenogastropoda
- Order: Neogastropoda
- Family: Cancellariidae
- Genus: Loxotaphrus
- Species: L. deshayesii

Binomial name
- Loxotaphrus deshayesii (Duval, 1841)

Synonyms
- Cassidaria deshayesii Duval, 1841

Species of gastropod

Loxotaphrus deshayesii is a species of sea snail, a marine gastropod mollusk in the family Cancellariidae, the nutmeg snails.
