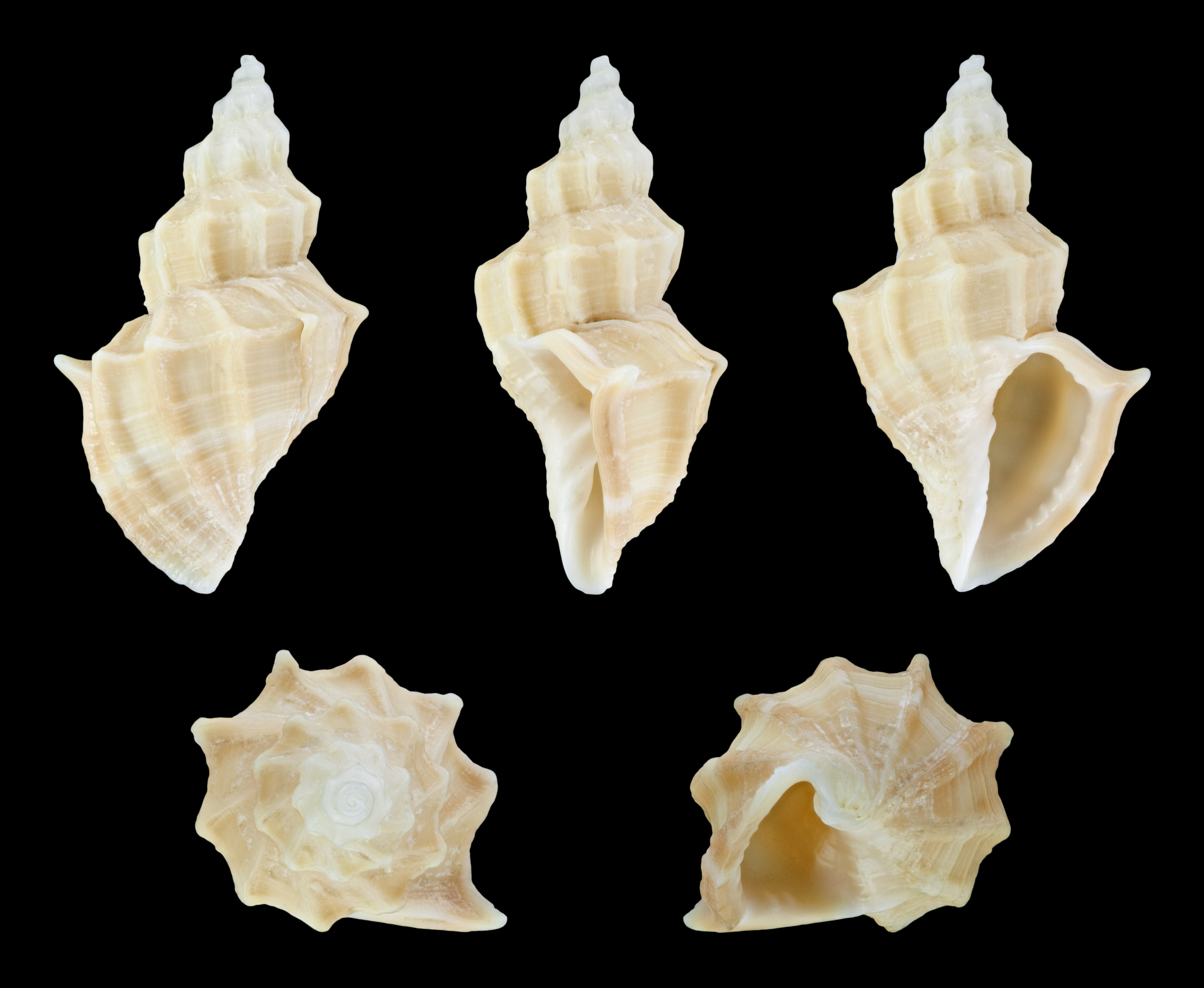
- Shell of Sveltia lyrata

Scientific classification
- Kingdom: Animalia
- Phylum: Mollusca
- Class: Gastropoda
- Subclass: Caenogastropoda
- Order: Neogastropoda
- Family: Cancellariidae
- Genus: Sveltia
- Species: S. lyrata

Binomial name
- Sveltia lyrata (Brocchi, 1814)

Synonyms
- Cancellaria turricula Lamarck, 1822; Voluta lyrata Brocchi, 1814; Voluta spinulosa Brocchi, 1814

= Sveltia lyrata =

Sveltia lyrata Temporal range: Paleocene–Pliocene

Species of gastropod

Sveltia lyrata, common name lyrate nutmeg, is a species of sea snail, a marine gastropod mollusc in the family Cancellariidae, the nutmeg snails.

The genus Sveltia is known in the fossil records from the Paleocene to the Pliocene (age range: from 55.8 to 2.588 million years ago).

== Description ==
Sveltia lyrata can reach a size of about 25–56 millimetres (0.98–2.20 in).

== Distribution ==
This species is widespread from Mauritania to South Africa.
