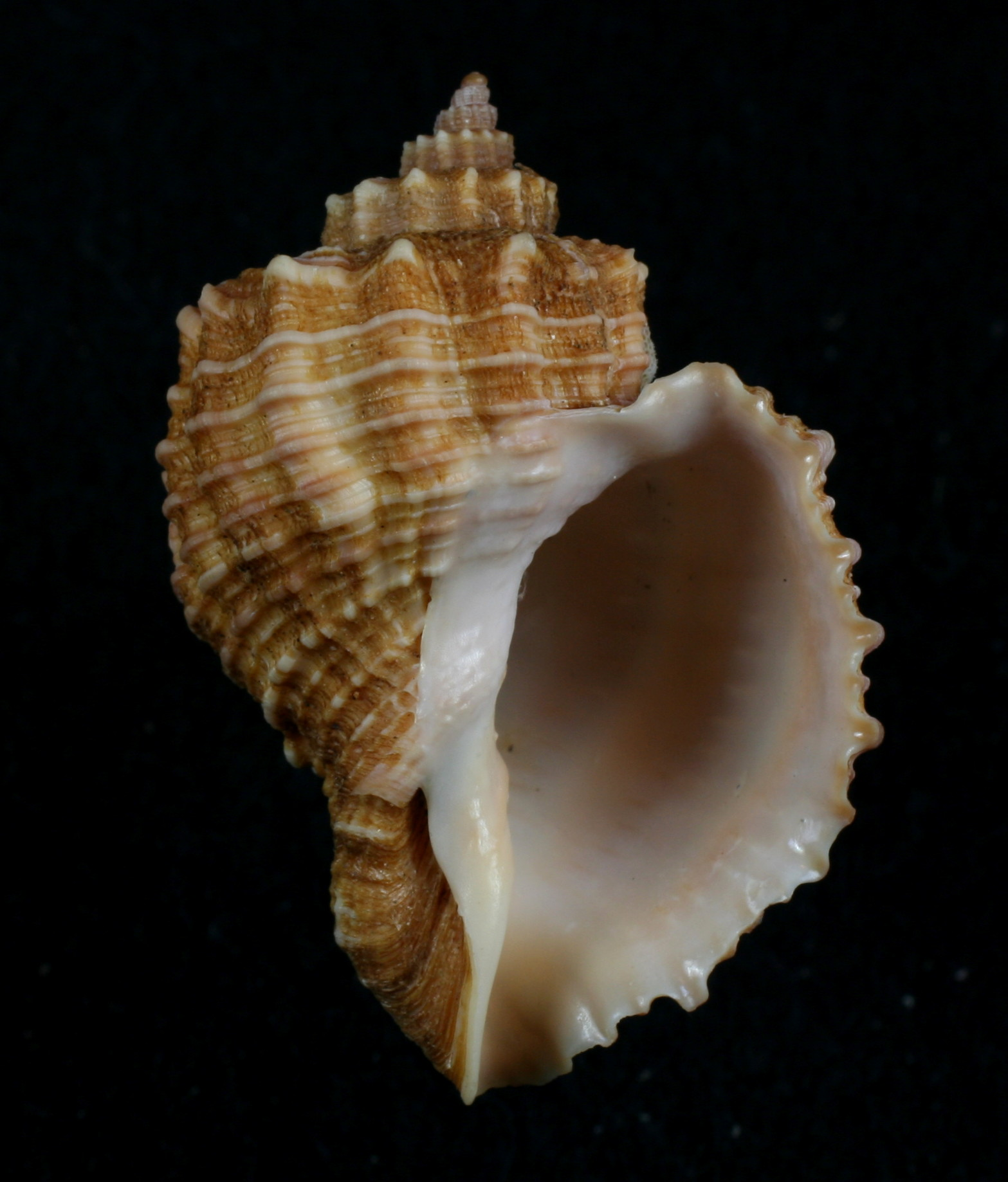
- Apertural view of shell of Habesolatia nodulifera (G.B. Sowerby I, 1825)

Scientific classification
- Kingdom: Animalia
- Phylum: Mollusca
- Class: Gastropoda
- Subclass: Caenogastropoda
- Order: Neogastropoda
- Family: Cancellariidae
- Genus: Habesolatia
- Species: H. nodulifera

Binomial name
- Habesolatia nodulifera (G.B. Sowerby I, 1825)

= Habesolatia nodulifera =

Species of gastropod

Habesolatia nodulifera is a species of sea snail, a marine gastropod mollusk in the family of Cancellariidae, the nutmeg snails.
