= Microsveltia sagamiensis =

Scientific classification
- Kingdom: Animalia
- Phylum: Mollusca
- Class: Gastropoda
- Subclass: Caenogastropoda
- Order: Neogastropoda
- Family: Cancellariidae
- Genus: Microsveltia
- Species: M. sagamiensis

Binomial name
- Microsveltia sagamiensis (Kuroda & Habe, 1971)

Synonyms
- Neadmete sagamiensis Kuroda & Habe, 1971

Species of gastropod

Microsveltia sagamiensis is a species of sea snail, a marine gastropod mollusc in the family Cancellariidae, the nutmeg snails.
