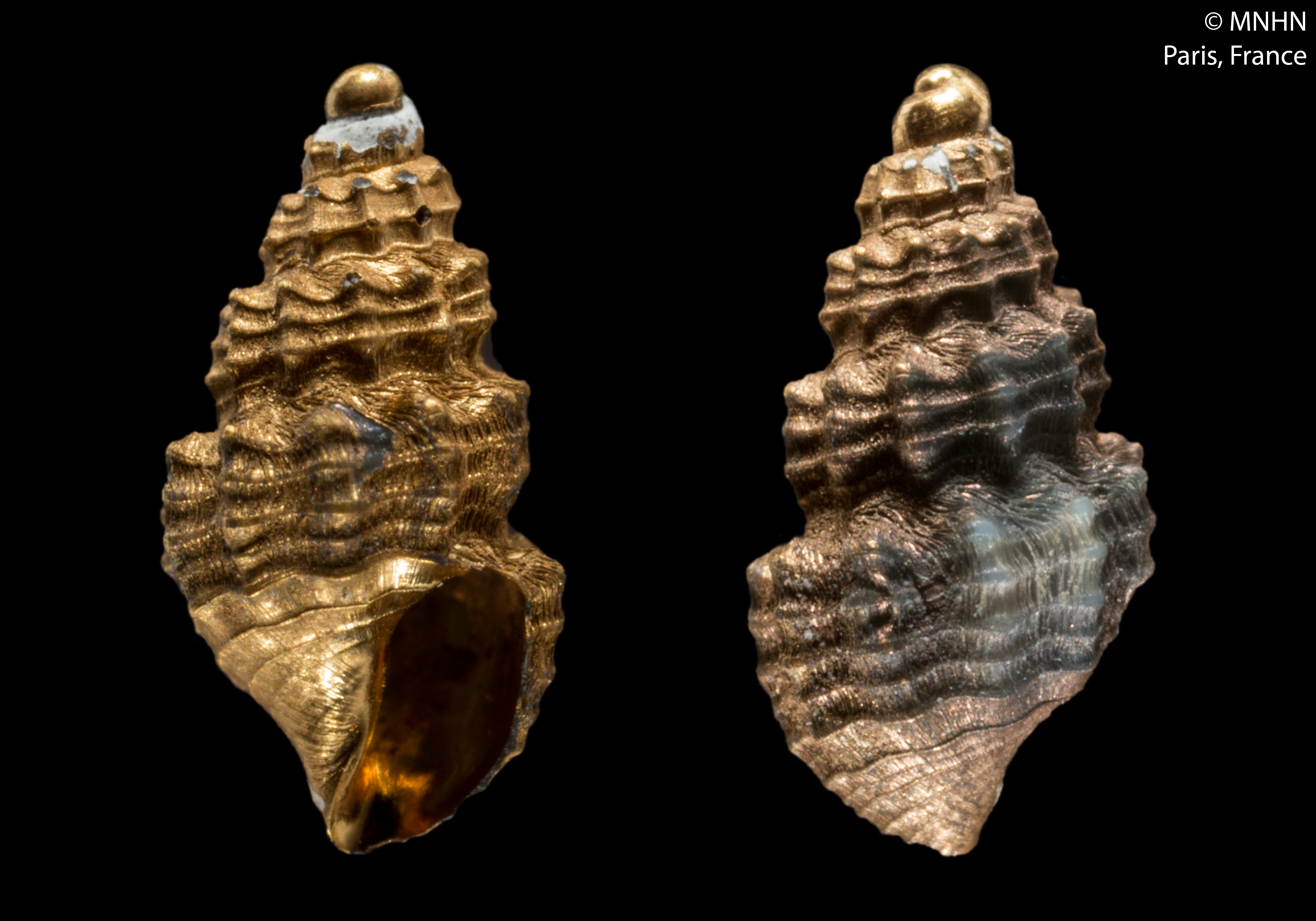
- Shell of Microsveltia procerula (holotype at MNHN, Paris)

Scientific classification
- Kingdom: Animalia
- Phylum: Mollusca
- Class: Gastropoda
- Subclass: Caenogastropoda
- Order: Neogastropoda
- Family: Cancellariidae
- Genus: Microsveltia
- Species: M. procerula

Binomial name
- Microsveltia procerula Verhecken, 1997

= Microsveltia procerula =

Species of gastropod

Microsveltia procerula is a species of sea snail, a marine gastropod mollusc in the family Cancellariidae, the nutmeg snails.

== Description ==
The length of the shell attains 4.4 mm.

== Distribution ==
This marine species occurs off Tanimbar Island, Indonesia.
