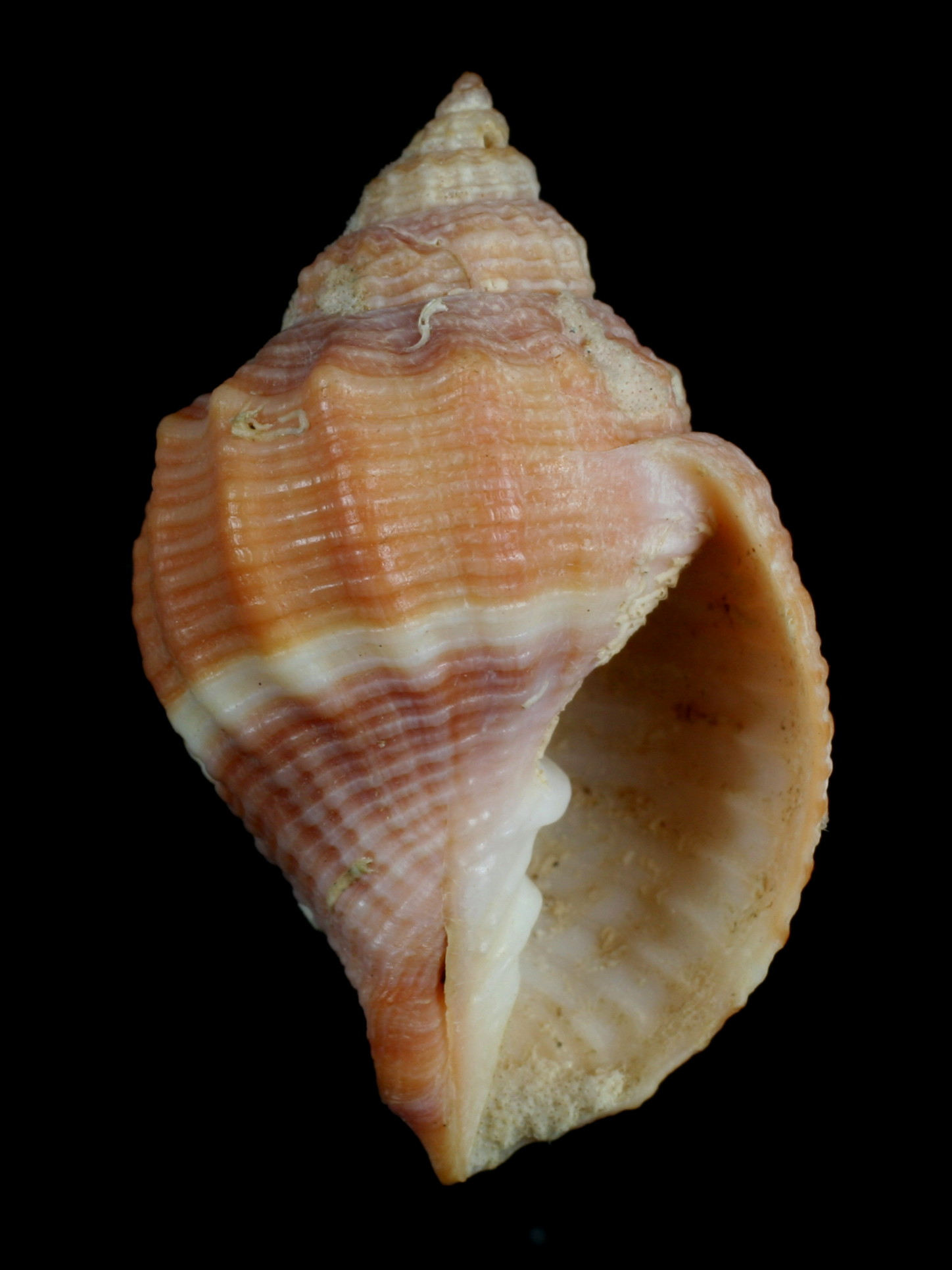
- Apertural view of shell of Euclia cassidiformis (Sowerby, 1832)

Scientific classification
- Kingdom: Animalia
- Phylum: Mollusca
- Class: Gastropoda
- Subclass: Caenogastropoda
- Order: Neogastropoda
- Family: Cancellariidae
- Genus: Euclia
- Species: E. cassidiformis

Binomial name
- Euclia cassidiformis (Sowerby, 1832)

= Euclia cassidiformis =

Species of gastropod

Euclia cassidiformis is a species of sea snail, a marine gastropod mollusk in the family Cancellariidae, the nutmeg snails.
