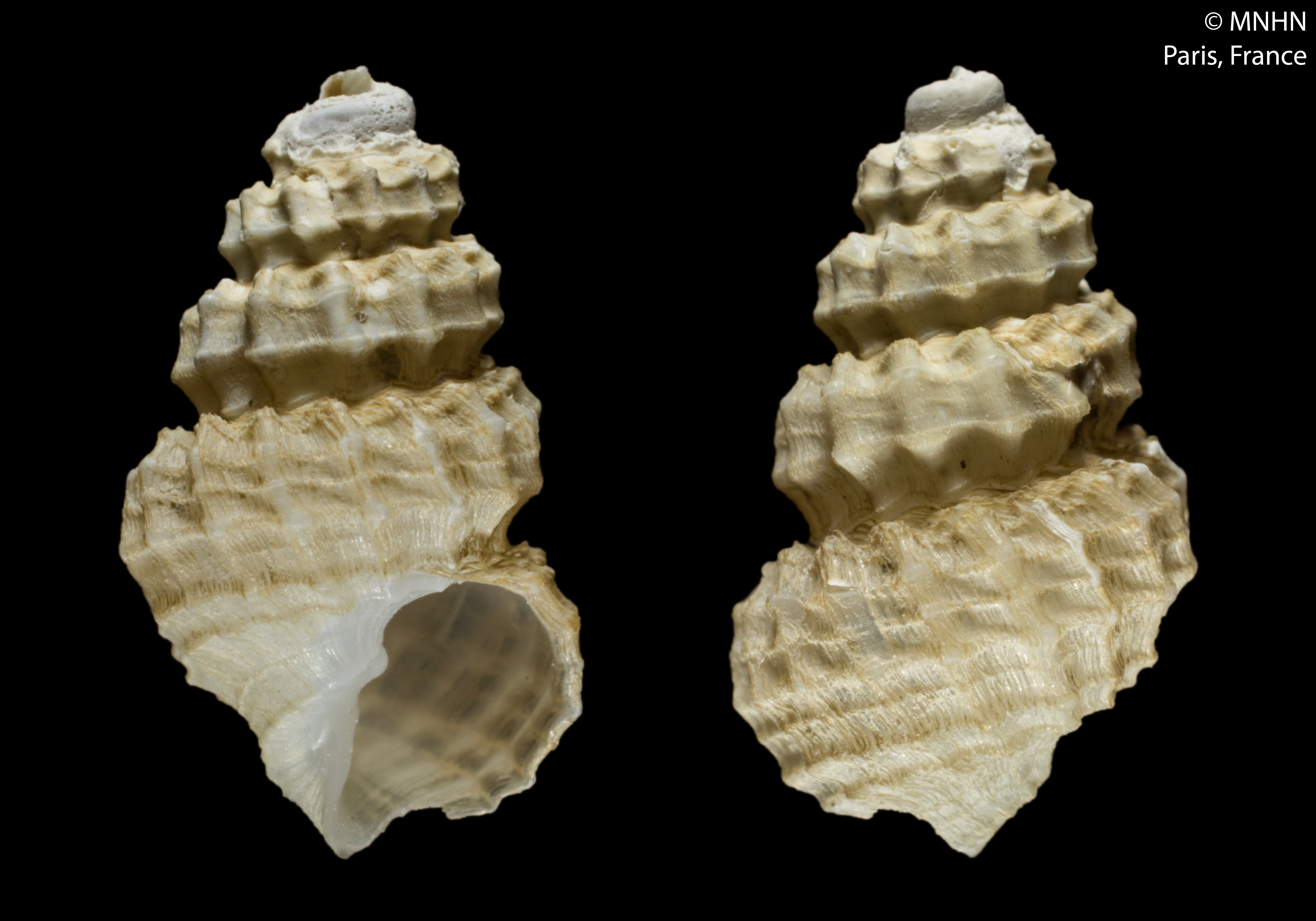
- preserved specimen of Microsveltia karubar

Scientific classification
- Kingdom: Animalia
- Phylum: Mollusca
- Class: Gastropoda
- Subclass: Caenogastropoda
- Order: Neogastropoda
- Family: Cancellariidae
- Genus: Microsveltia
- Species: M. karubar

Binomial name
- Microsveltia karubar Verhecken, 1997

= Microsveltia karubar =

Species of gastropod

Microsveltia karubar is a species of sea snail, a marine gastropod mollusc in the family Cancellariidae, the nutmeg snails.
