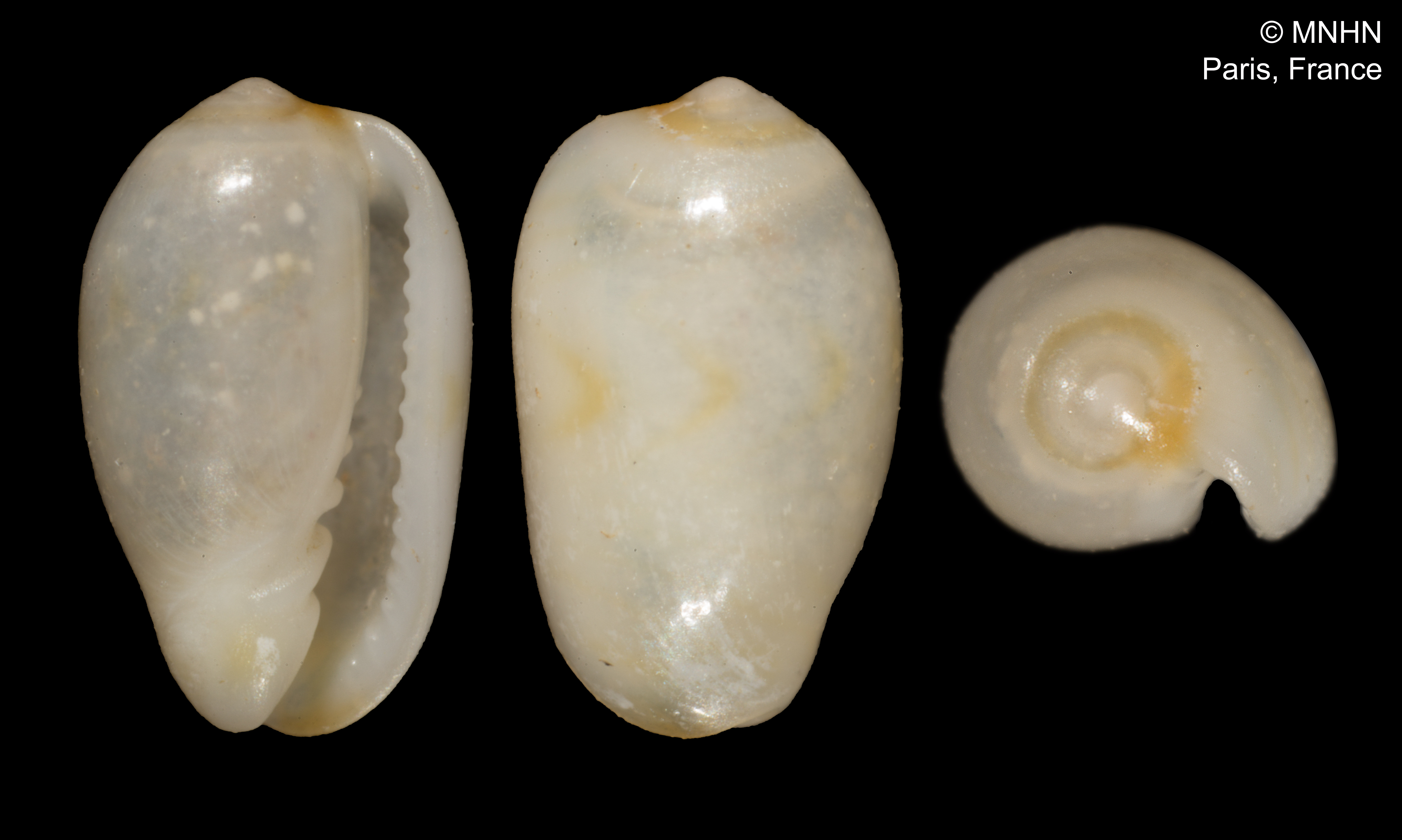

Scientific classification
- Kingdom: Animalia
- Phylum: Mollusca
- Class: Gastropoda
- Subclass: Caenogastropoda
- Order: Neogastropoda
- Family: Cystiscidae
- Subfamily: Cystiscinae
- Genus: Gibberula
- Species: G. lucia

Binomial name
- Gibberula lucia Jousseaume, 1877

= Gibberula lucia =

Species of gastropod

Gibberula lucia is a species of sea snail, a marine gastropod mollusk, in the family Cystiscidae.

== Distribution ==
This marine species occurs off Cape Verdes.
