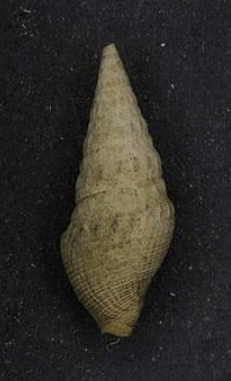
- Shell of Drillia cecchii (specimen at Naturalis Biodiversity Center)

Scientific classification
- Kingdom: Animalia
- Phylum: Mollusca
- Class: Gastropoda
- Subclass: Caenogastropoda
- Order: Neogastropoda
- Superfamily: Conoidea
- Family: Drilliidae
- Genus: Drillia
- Species: D. cecchii

Binomial name
- Drillia cecchii Jousseaume, 1891

Synonyms
- Inquisitor cecchii (Jousseaume, 1891); Pleurotoma (Drillia) cecchii Melvill, 1895

= Drillia cecchii =

Species of gastropod

Drillia cecchii is a species of sea snail, a marine gastropod mollusk in the family Drilliidae.

== Description ==
The length of the shell attains 20 mm, its diameter 7 mm.

The shell is long, narrow and turreted. Its color is yellowish white or grayish white. The shell is adorned with seven very prominent axial ribs and very fine spiral striae. The spire contains 11 convex whorls; separated by a wide and deep depression with the suture in its bottom. The first two whorls are smooth and shining, forming a blunt apex. The next whorls show revolving striae and 7 - 8 axial ribs, often with small brown spots, terminating in the middle part of the canal. This siphonal canal is short, wide and somewhat notched. The aperture measures about a third of the total length of the shell. The columellar lip is concave backwards, while its front is almost rectilinear. The thin outer lip is convex and contains a large varix. The anal sinus is large and deep.

== Distribution ==
This species occurs in the demersal zone of the Western Indian Ocean off Aden and Yemen.
