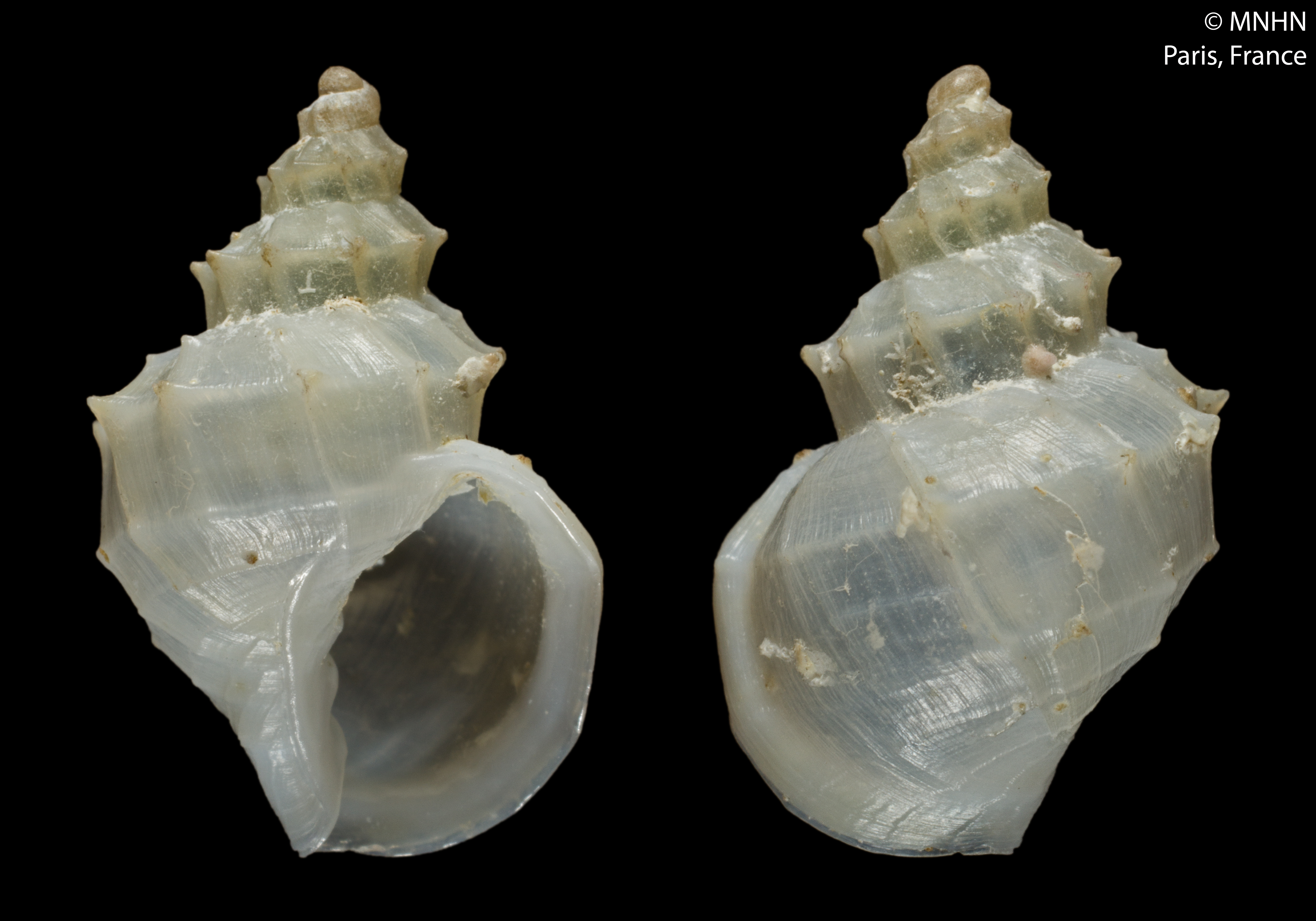
- Shell of Sveltia rocroii (holotype at MNHN, Paris)

Scientific classification
- Kingdom: Animalia
- Phylum: Mollusca
- Class: Gastropoda
- Subclass: Caenogastropoda
- Order: Neogastropoda
- Family: Cancellariidae
- Genus: Sveltia
- Species: S. rocroii

Binomial name
- Sveltia rocroii Bouchet & Petit, 2002

= Sveltia rocroii =

Species of gastropod

Sveltia rocroii is a species of sea snail, a marine gastropod mollusc in the family Cancellariidae, the nutmeg snails.

== Description ==
The length of the shell attains 14.2 mm. The shell is mostly colored white.

== Distribution ==
This marine species occurs off New Caledonia.
