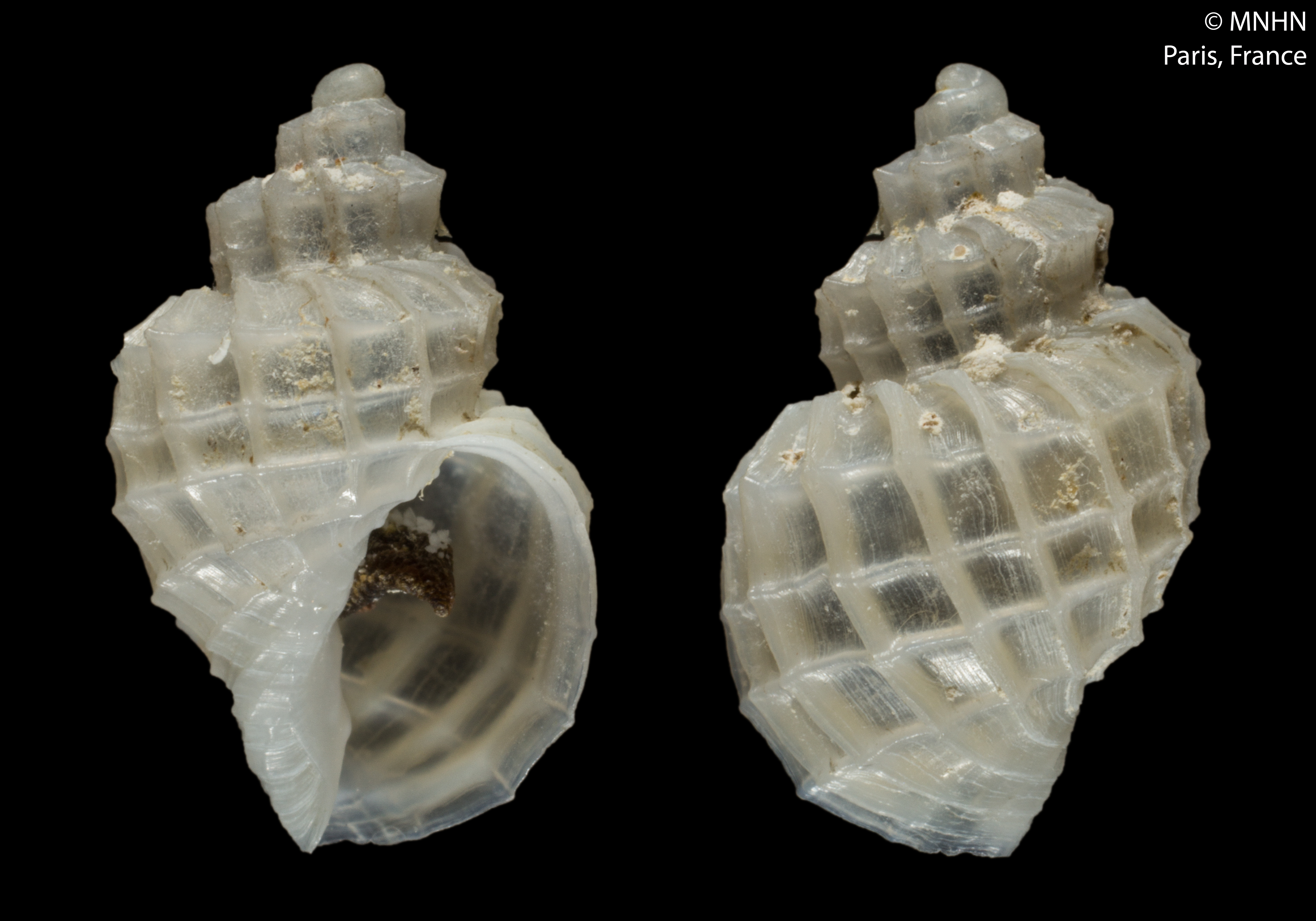
- Shell of Sveltia splendidula (holotype at MNHN, Paris)

Scientific classification
- Kingdom: Animalia
- Phylum: Mollusca
- Class: Gastropoda
- Subclass: Caenogastropoda
- Order: Neogastropoda
- Family: Cancellariidae
- Genus: Sveltia
- Species: S. splendidula

Binomial name
- Sveltia splendidula Bouchet & Petit, 2002

= Sveltia splendidula =

Species of gastropod

Sveltia splendidula is a species of sea snail, a marine gastropod mollusc in the family Cancellariidae, the nutmeg snails.

== Description ==
The length of the shell attains 10.9 mm.

== Distribution ==
This marine species occurs off New Caledonia.
