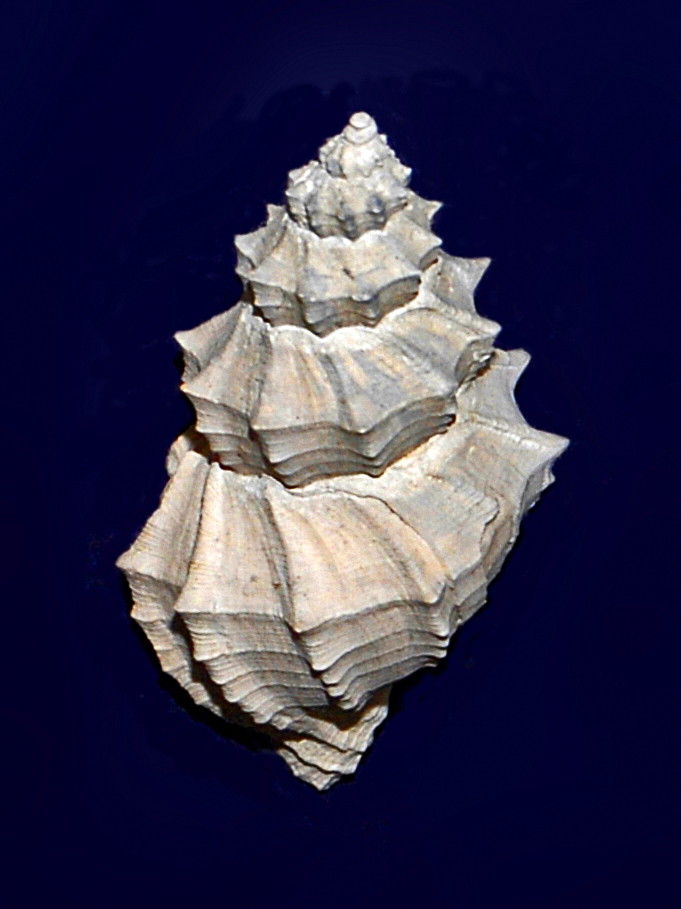
- Fossil shell of Sveltia lyrata from Pliocene of Italy

Scientific classification
- Kingdom: Animalia
- Phylum: Mollusca
- Class: Gastropoda
- Subclass: Caenogastropoda
- Order: Neogastropoda
- Superfamily: Volutoidea
- Family: Cancellariidae
- Genus: Sveltia; Jousseaume, 1887

Type species
- Voluta varicosa Brocchi, 1814

Synonyms
- † Cancellaria (Sveltia) Jousseaume, 1887

= Sveltia =

Extinct genus of gastropods

Sveltia is a genus in the subfamily Cancellariinae of the nutmeg sea snails with an extensive fossil range.

== Fossil records ==
This genus is known in the fossil records from the Paleocene to the Pliocene (age range: from 55.8 to 2.588 million years ago). Fossils are found in the marine strata of the Dominican Republic, Ecuador, India, Italy, Mexico, Argentina, Belgium, Germany, Panama, Nigeria and United States.

== Species ==
Species within the genus Sveltia include:

- † Sveltia alveata (Conrad, 1833)
- † Sveltia caerulea Lozouet, 1999
- † Sveltia castellum Lozouet, 2019
- Sveltia centrota (Dall, 1896)
- † Sveltia alveata (Conrad, 1833)
- † Sveltia caerulea Lozouet, 1999
- † Sveltia castellum Lozouet, 2019
- Sveltia gladiator (Petit, 1976)
- Sveltia lyrata (Brocchi, 1814)
- † Sveltia nemethi Kovács & Vicián, 2016
- † Sveltia pyrenaica Peyrot, 1928
- Sveltia rocroii Bouchet & Petit, 2002
- † Sveltia ruginosa Lozouet, 2019
- † Sveltia salbriacensis Peyrot, 1928
- Sveltia splendidula Bouchet & Petit, 2002
- † Sveltia suessi (Hoernes, 1875)
- † Sveltia varicosa (Brocchi, 1814)
- † Sveltia varonei Lozouet, 2019
- Sveltia yoyottei Petit & Harasewych, 2011

Synonyms

- † Sveltia aturensis Peyrot, 1928: synonym of † Tribia aturensis (Peyrot, 1928) (original combination)
- † Sveltia burdigalensis Peyrot, 1928: synonym of † Scalptia burdigalensis (Peyrot, 1928)
- † Sveltia calcarata (Brocchi, 1814): synonym of † Calcarata calcarata (Brocchi, 1814)
- † Sveltia castexi Peyrot, 1928: synonym of † Coptostoma castexi (Peyrot, 1928) (original combination)
- † Sveltia peyreirensis Peyrot, 1928: synonym of † Unitas peyreirensis (Peyrot, 1928) (original combination)
