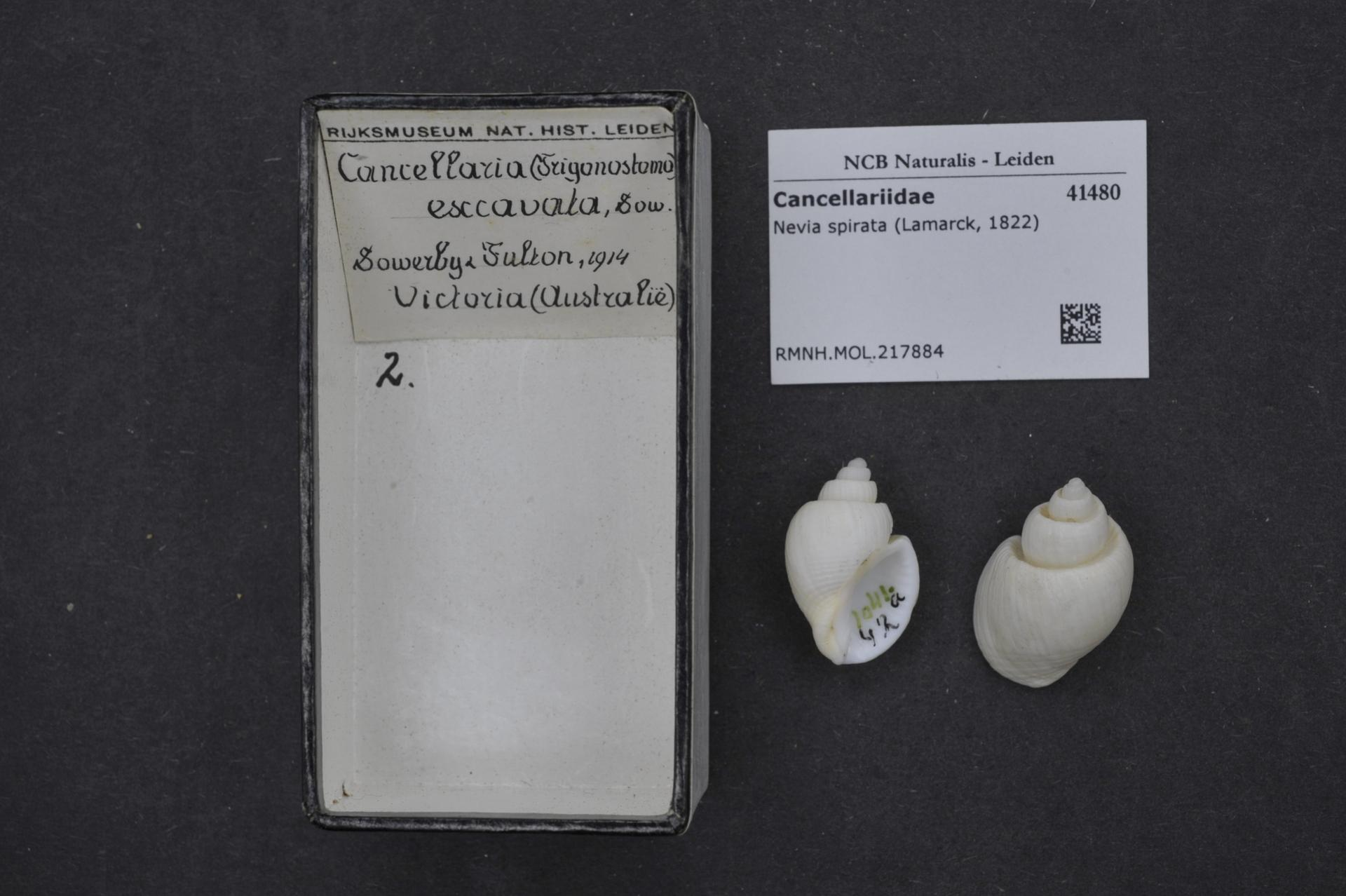

Scientific classification
- Kingdom: Animalia
- Phylum: Mollusca
- Class: Gastropoda
- Subclass: Caenogastropoda
- Order: Neogastropoda
- Family: Cancellariidae
- Genus: Nevia
- Species: N. spirata

Binomial name
- Nevia spirata (Lamarck, 1822)

Synonyms
- Cancellaria excavata Sowerby, 1849; Cancellaria spirata Lamarck, 1822b

= Nevia spirata =

Species of gastropod

Nevia spirata is a species of sea snail, a marine gastropod mollusk in the family Cancellariidae, the nutmeg snails.
