= Fusiaphera macrospira =

Scientific classification
- Kingdom: Animalia
- Phylum: Mollusca
- Class: Gastropoda
- Subclass: Caenogastropoda
- Order: Neogastropoda
- Family: Cancellariidae
- Genus: Fusiaphera
- Species: F. macrospira

Binomial name
- Fusiaphera macrospira (A. Adams & Reeve, 1850)

Synonyms
- Cancellaria macrospira Adams & Reeve, 1850; Cancellaria azumai Habe, 1961; Cancellaria exquisita Preston, 1905; Cancellaria luscinia Melvill & Standen, 1903; Cancellaria macrospira A. Adams & Reeve, 1850; Cancellaria macrospiratoides Habe, 1961; Cancellaria pallida E.A. Smith, 1899; Cancellaria producta Sowerby, 1903; Cancellaria tosaensis Habe, 1961; Cancellaria wilmeri Sowerby, 1881; Fusiaphera azumai (Habe, 1961); Fusiaphera dampierensis Garrard, 1975; Fusiaphera eva Petit, 1980; Fusiaphera exquisita (Preston, 1905); Fusiaphera macrospiratoides (Habe, 1961); Fusiaphera pallida (E.A. Smith, 1899); Fusiaphera tosaensis (Habe, 1961)

Species of gastropod

Fusiaphera macrospira, common name the big-spired nutmeg, is a species of sea snail, a marine gastropod mollusk in the family Cancellariidae, the nutmeg snails.

== Description ==
The length of the shell varies between 14 mm and 30 mm.

== Distribution ==
This species is distributed in the Eastern Indian Ocean and in the Western Pacific Ocean.
