= Microsveltia recessa =

Scientific classification
- Kingdom: Animalia
- Phylum: Mollusca
- Class: Gastropoda
- Subclass: Caenogastropoda
- Order: Neogastropoda
- Family: Cancellariidae
- Genus: Microsveltia
- Species: M. recessa

Binomial name
- Microsveltia recessa Iredale, 1925

Species of sea snail

Microsveltia recessa is a species of sea snail, a marine gastropod mollusc in the family Cancellariidae, the nutmeg snails.
