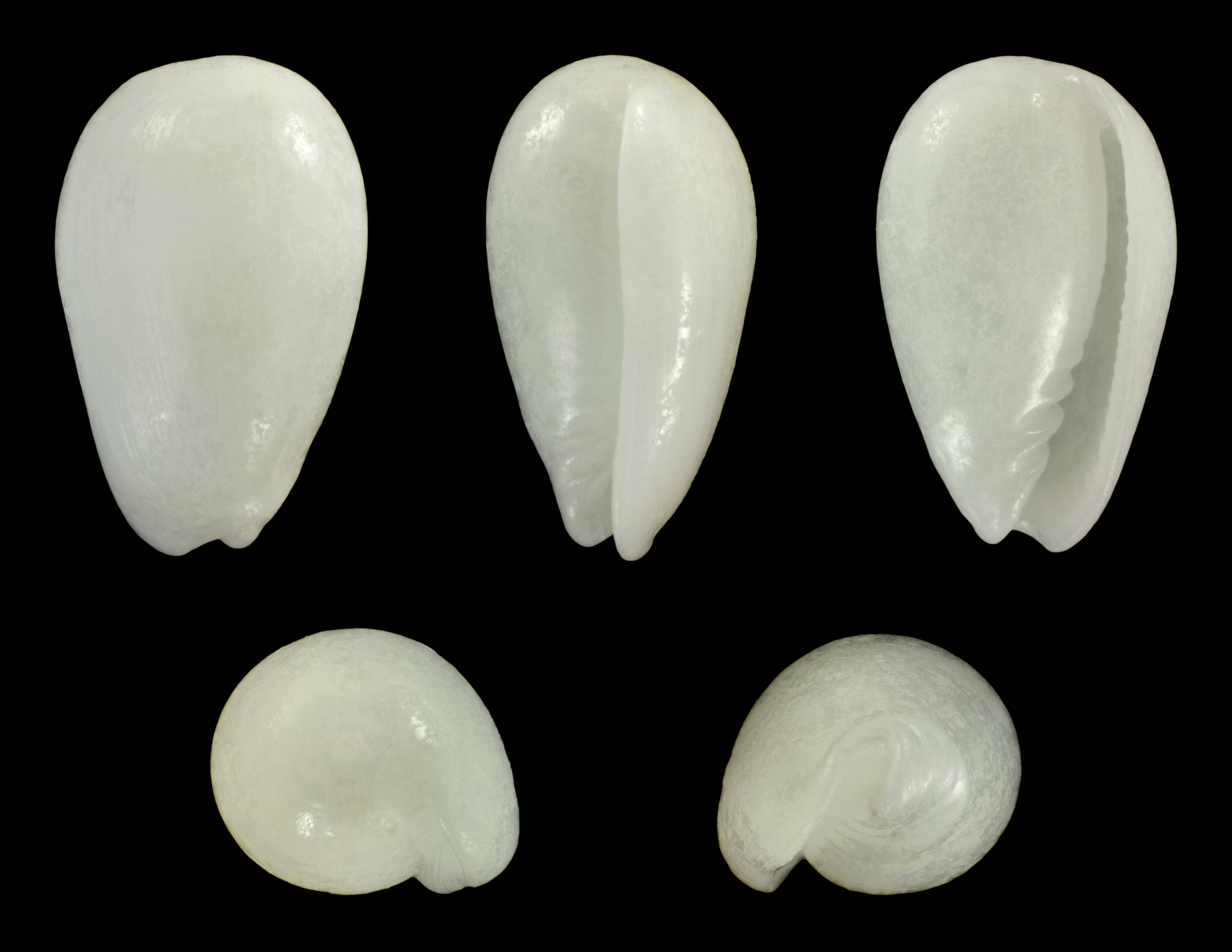
- Gibberula asellina

Scientific classification
- Kingdom: Animalia
- Phylum: Mollusca
- Class: Gastropoda
- Subclass: Caenogastropoda
- Order: Neogastropoda
- Family: Cystiscidae
- Subfamily: Cystiscinae
- Genus: Gibberula
- Species: G. asellina

Binomial name
- Gibberula asellina Jousseaume, 1875

Synonyms
- Gibberula mauritiana T. Cossignani, 2011

= Gibberula asellina =

Species of gastropod

Gibberula asellina is a species of sea snail, a marine gastropod mollusk, in the family Cystiscidae.

== Description ==
The length of the shell attains 4.7 mm.

== Distribution ==
This species occurs in the following locations:

- Mauritius
- Réunion
