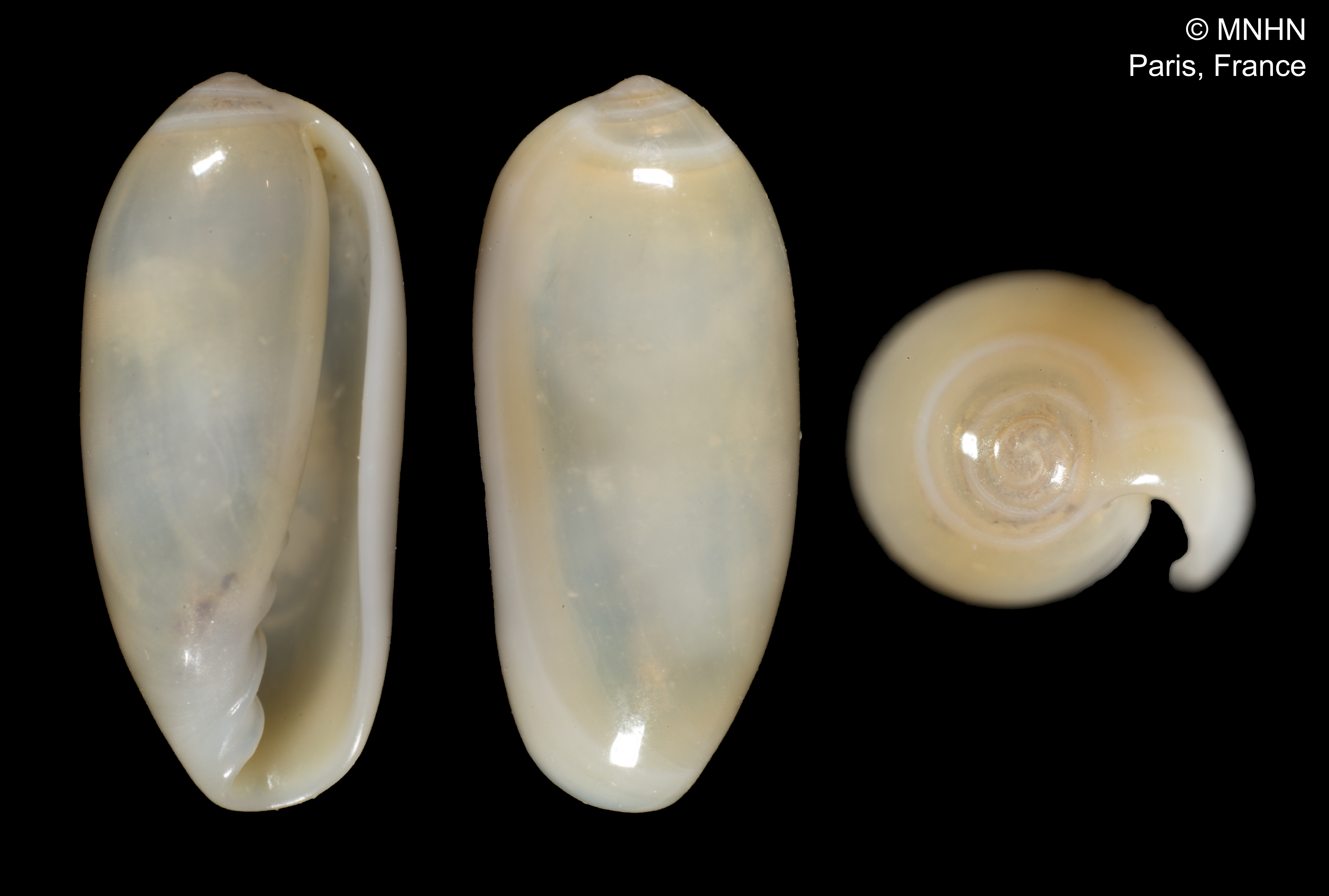
- Shell of Volvarina mexicana (syntype at MNHN, Paris)

Scientific classification
- Kingdom: Animalia
- Phylum: Mollusca
- Class: Gastropoda
- Subclass: Caenogastropoda
- Order: Neogastropoda
- Family: Marginellidae
- Subfamily: Marginellinae
- Genus: Volvarina
- Species: V. mexicana

Binomial name
- Volvarina mexicana Jousseaume, 1875

= Volvarina mexicana =

Species of gastropod

Volvarina mexicana is a species of sea snail, a marine gastropod mollusk in the family Marginellidae, the margin snails.

== Description ==
The length of the shell attains 7 mm, its diameter 2.5 mm.

The solid shell has an elongated ovoid shape. It is opaque, smooth and shiny. Its color is of a white porcelain. It shows four transverse bands of a yellow so pale, they almost blend with the hue general of the shell.

The spire consists of four whorls. The first three form, at the end of the shell, a small bluish white apex which seems embedded in an extension of the outer edge. The suture that separates them is bordered with a small whitish edging which allows the outline to be followed.

The aperture is very narrow behind and a little wider in front. It terminates in a broad and deep canal. Its length is equal to that of the axis of the shell. The outer lip, smooth, whitish and a little constricted at its middle part, sways on the side of the aperture. Its posterior end rises almost to the top, forming an angle that embraces the whorl. The inner lip is nearly straight. Its anterior end contains four plicae, all the more projecting and oblique as they are more anterior. The first of these folds unites, after a spiral curve, with the outer edge, with which it forms the margin of the anterior canal of the aperture.

== Distribution ==
This marine species occurs off Mexico, Caribbean Sea.
