= Perplicaria clarki =

Scientific classification
- Kingdom: Animalia
- Phylum: Mollusca
- Class: Gastropoda
- Subclass: Caenogastropoda
- Order: Neogastropoda
- Family: Cancellariidae
- Genus: Perplicaria
- Species: P. clarki

Binomial name
- Perplicaria clarki M. Smith, 1947

Species of gastropod

Perplicaria clarki is a species of sea snail, a marine gastropod mollusk in the family Cancellariidae, the nutmeg snails.
