= Plesiotriton vivus =

Scientific classification
- Kingdom: Animalia
- Phylum: Mollusca
- Class: Gastropoda
- Subclass: Caenogastropoda
- Order: Neogastropoda
- Family: Cancellariidae
- Genus: Plesiotriton
- Species: P. vivus

Binomial name
- Plesiotriton vivus Habe & Okutani, 1981

Species of gastropod

Plesiotriton vivus is a species of sea snail, a marine gastropod mollusc in the family Cancellariidae, the nutmeg snails.
