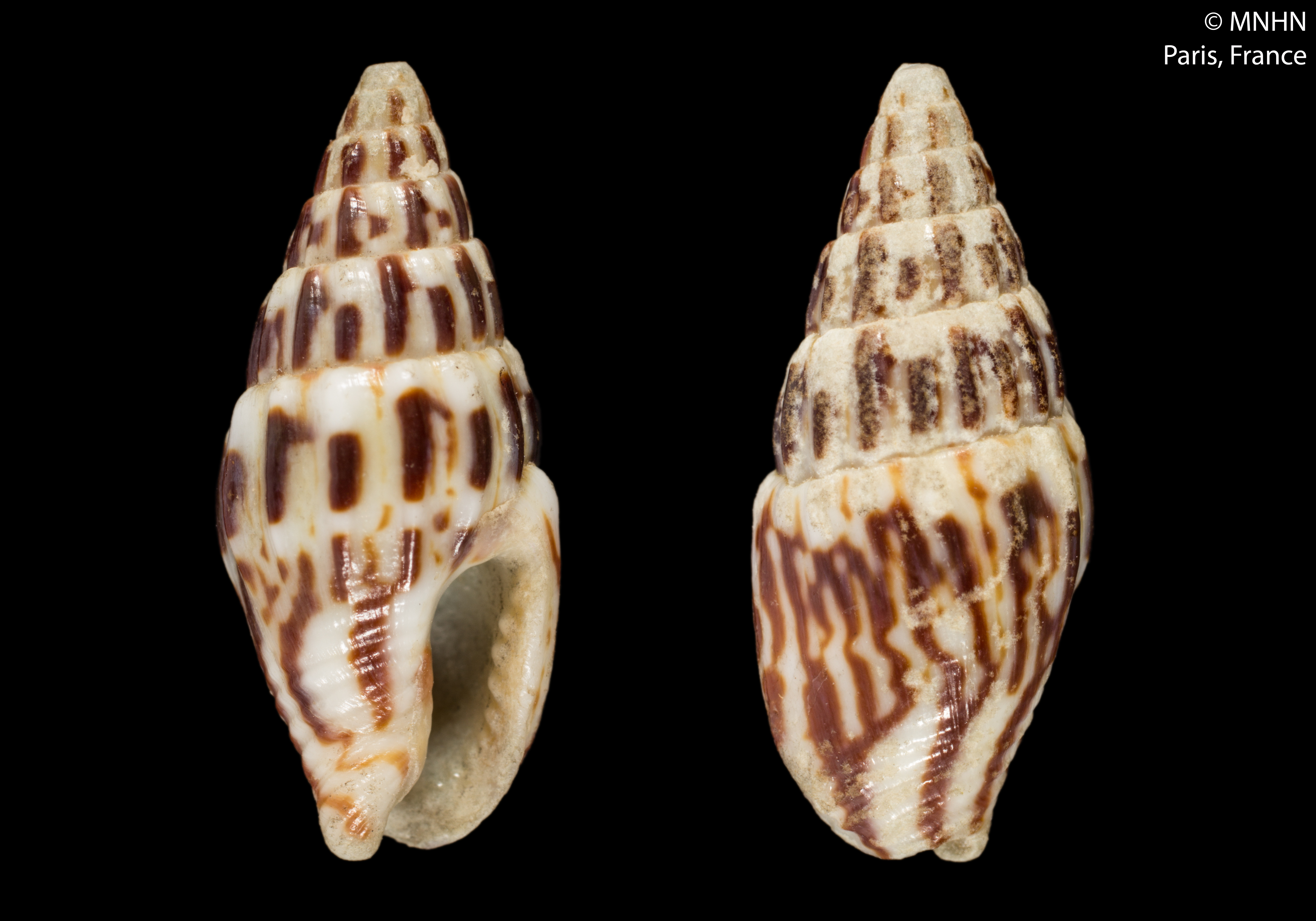
- Shell of Anachis fauroti (lectotype at MNHN, Paris)

Scientific classification
- Kingdom: Animalia
- Phylum: Mollusca
- Class: Gastropoda
- Subclass: Caenogastropoda
- Order: Neogastropoda
- Family: Columbellidae
- Genus: Anachis
- Species: A. fauroti

Binomial name
- Anachis fauroti (Jousseaume, 1888)

Synonyms
- Atilia fauroti Jousseaume, 1888 (original combination)

= Anachis fauroti =

Species of gastropod

Anachis fauroti is a species of sea snail in the family Columbellidae, the dove snails.

== Description ==
The length of the shell measures between 13 mm and 15 mm, its dimensions attain 5.5 mm.

(Original description in French) The shell has an elongated oval shape with a slender, conical spire, sometimes taking on a subulate shape. The shell is thick and solid and is adorned with longitudinal ribs and very fine circular striae.

Its color consists of alternating white longitudinal bands and black, flexuous, and irregular bands.

The spire is formed by 9 whorls, separated by a very distinct linear suture; their development occurs slowly and regularly. The first two whorls, which are very often missing, are smooth. The subsequent whorls, however, are ornamented with rounded and projecting ribs and fine circular striae that can only be seen with the aid of a magnifying glass. The ribs are a beautiful black, while the intervals are yellowish-white. It is observed that, near the suture, every two ribs are crowned with white spots. The body whorl is slightly swollen and has approximately half the total length of the shell. Its underside, like the preceding whorls, is adorned with longitudinal ribs, while its dorsal part exhibits only spiny, prominent tubercles located near the suture. The circular striae become stronger, more prominent, and visible to the naked eye on the canal. Its color, composed of black and yellowish-white bands, is divided into two parts by a whitish circular zone. The spots on the posterior part show the same arrangement as those we noted on the preceding whorls, while on the anterior part, the longer and wider bands are ten in number: five black and five white. The aperture, irregularly oval in shape, terminates anteriorly in a deep siphonal canal directed upwards and to the left. The peristome is formed by a columellar lip and an outer lip, connected posteriorly by a rather thick layer of coating. The columellar lip, which rises slightly outwards, is encrusted inwardly towards its middle part, which is colored with brown spots; under magnification, three small, obsolete denticles can be seen above this encrustation. The outer lip, raised posteriorly, is outwardly doubled by a more prominent and anteriorly more distant ridge than posteriorly, while internally it is almost smooth and colored by a reddish-brown longitudinal band.

== Distribution ==
This marine species occurs off Djibouti.
