= Microsveltia patricia =

Scientific classification
- Kingdom: Animalia
- Phylum: Mollusca
- Class: Gastropoda
- Subclass: Caenogastropoda
- Order: Neogastropoda
- Family: Cancellariidae
- Genus: Microsveltia
- Species: M. patricia

Binomial name
- Microsveltia patricia (Thiele, 1925)

Synonyms
- Cancellaria patricia Thiele, 1925 (original combination)

Species of gastropod

Microsveltia patricia is a species of sea snail, a marine gastropod mollusc in the family Cancellariidae, the nutmeg snails.
