= Sveltia centrota =

Scientific classification
- Kingdom: Animalia
- Phylum: Mollusca
- Class: Gastropoda
- Subclass: Caenogastropoda
- Order: Neogastropoda
- Family: Cancellariidae
- Genus: Sveltia
- Species: S. centrota

Binomial name
- Sveltia centrota (Dall, 1896)

Synonyms
- Cancellaria centrota Dall, 1896

Species of gastropod

Sveltia centrota is a species of sea snail, a marine gastropod mollusc in the family Cancellariidae, the nutmeg snails.
