= Gergovia petiti =

Scientific classification
- Kingdom: Animalia
- Phylum: Mollusca
- Class: Gastropoda
- Subclass: Caenogastropoda
- Order: Neogastropoda
- Family: Cancellariidae
- Genus: †Gergovia
- Species: †G. petiti

Binomial name
- †Gergovia petiti de Barros & de Lima, 2007

Species of gastropod

Gergovia petiti is a species of sea snail, a marine gastropod mollusc in the family Cancellariidae, the nutmeg snails.
