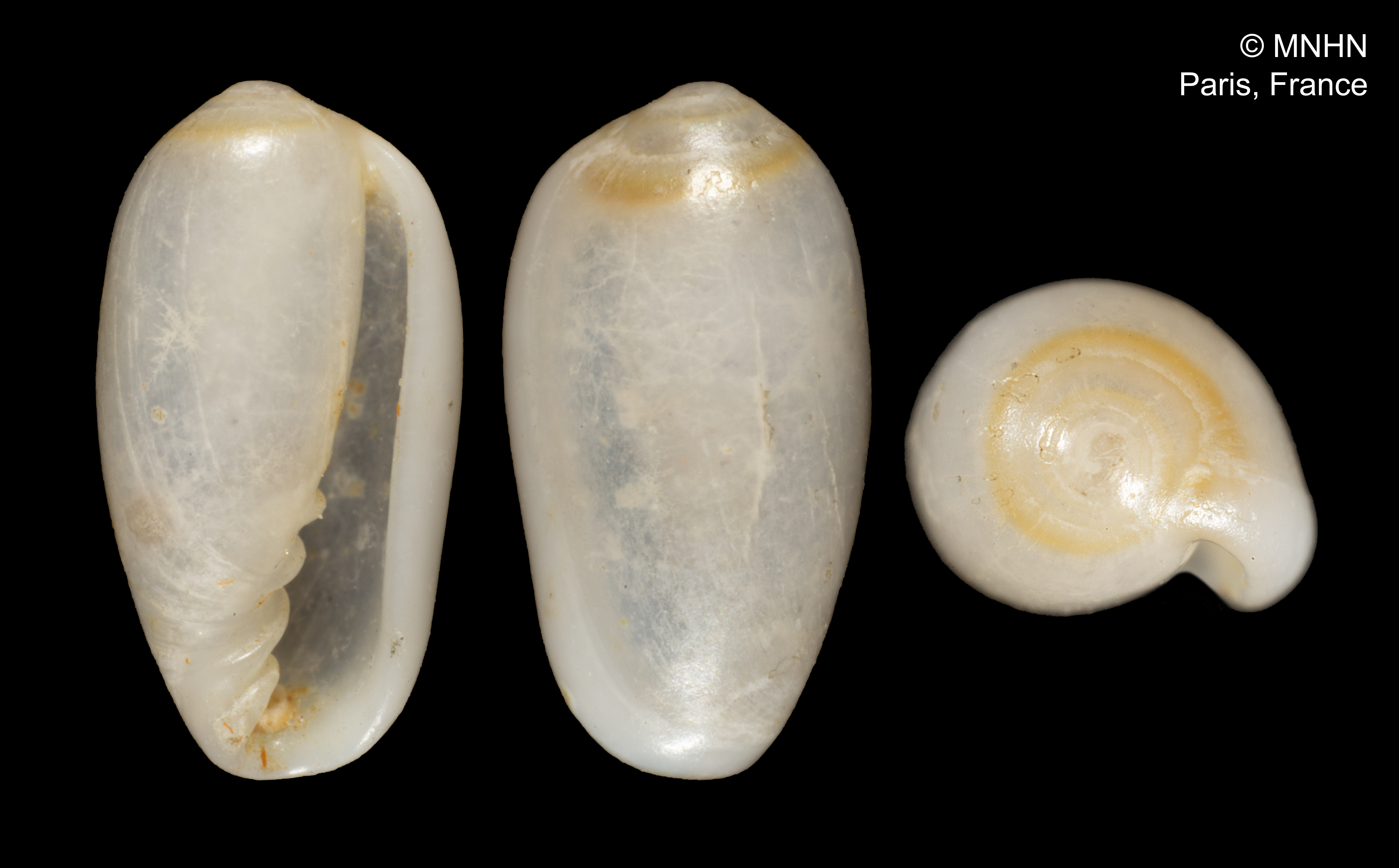
- Shell of Volvarina bazini (syntype at MNHN, Paris)

Scientific classification
- Kingdom: Animalia
- Phylum: Mollusca
- Class: Gastropoda
- Subclass: Caenogastropoda
- Order: Neogastropoda
- Family: Marginellidae
- Genus: Volvarina
- Species: V. bazini

Binomial name
- Volvarina bazini Jousseaume, 1875

= Volvarina bazini =

Species of gastropod

Volvarina bazini is a species of sea snail, a marine gastropod mollusk in the family Marginellidae, the margin snails.

== Description ==
The length of the shell attains 6.4 mm, its diameter 2.5 mm.

The small shell has the shape of an elongated ovoid. It is slightly narrower in front than behind. The shell is vitreous white, fairly solid, subtransparent, smooth and shiny. It is adorned, near the suture, with a yellowish-brown border, which allows, at first sight, to distinguish it from other species of the same genus.

The spire consists of four whorls, separated by a whitish linear suture, bordered outside by the yellowish-brown border that we have just mentioned. The first three whorls form, at the posterior end, a small mamillate protoconch. The body whorl constitutes almost the entire length of the shell.

The aperture extends from one end of the shell to the other. It has the shape of a slit, narrower behind than in front. It widens noticeably at the level of the columellar plicae. It ends behind in a narrow and superficial channel and ends in front in a broad and deep gutter. Its outer edge, almost straight, smooth and of a porcelain white, flows inwards at the level of its middle part. It is doubled on the outside by a fairly wide and projecting longitudinal bead, which originates behind on the penultimate whorl of which it does not exceed the posterior suture. The columellar edge, slightly sinuous, shows in front four projecting and oblique plicae.

== Distribution ==
This marine species occurs off Senegal.
