= Cancellaphera amasia =

Scientific classification
- Kingdom: Animalia
- Phylum: Mollusca
- Class: Gastropoda
- Subclass: Caenogastropoda
- Order: Neogastropoda
- Family: Cancellariidae
- Genus: Cancellaphera
- Species: C. amasia

Binomial name
- Cancellaphera amasia Iredale, 1930

Species of gastropod

Cancellaphera amasia is a species of sea snail, a marine gastropod mollusk in the family Cancellariidae, the nutmeg snails.
