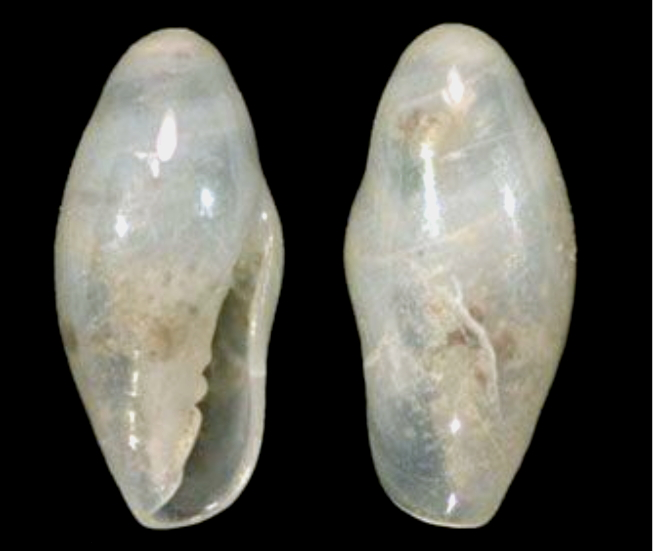
- Shell of Volvarina unilineata (specimen at the Natural History Museum, Rotterdam)

Scientific classification
- Kingdom: Animalia
- Phylum: Mollusca
- Class: Gastropoda
- Subclass: Caenogastropoda
- Order: Neogastropoda
- Family: Marginellidae
- Subfamily: Marginellinae
- Genus: Volvarina
- Species: V. unilineata

Binomial name
- Volvarina unilineata Jousseaume, 1875

Synonyms
- Marginella unilineata Jousseaume, 1875 (original combination); Marginella fusiformis (Reeve, 1845); Volvarina fusiformis Hinds, 1844

= Volvarina unilineata =

Species of gastropod

Volvarina unilineata is a species of sea snail, a marine gastropod mollusk in the family Marginellidae, the margin snails.

== Description ==
The length of the shell attains 14 mm.

(Original description) The shell is fusiform-ovate, attenuated towards the base, milky-white, shiny, and sometimes banded with an orangey-brown line. The spire is conical, the outer lip is flexuous, and the columella is quadriplicate (four-folded).

The shell is white and slightly angulated posteriorly. It possesses an inferior revolving brown band.

== Distribution ==
This marine species occurs off the Philippines and Hawaii.
