= Plesiotriton mirabilis =

Scientific classification
- Kingdom: Animalia
- Phylum: Mollusca
- Class: Gastropoda
- Subclass: Caenogastropoda
- Order: Neogastropoda
- Family: Cancellariidae
- Genus: Plesiotriton
- Species: P. mirabilis

Binomial name
- Plesiotriton mirabilis Beu & Maxwell, 1987

Species of gastropod

Plesiotriton mirabilis is a species of sea snail, a marine gastropod mollusc in the family Cancellariidae, the nutmeg snails.
