= Loxotaphrus rosadoi =

Scientific classification
- Kingdom: Animalia
- Phylum: Mollusca
- Class: Gastropoda
- Subclass: Caenogastropoda
- Order: Neogastropoda
- Family: Cancellariidae
- Genus: Loxotaphrus
- Species: L. rosadoi

Binomial name
- Loxotaphrus rosadoi Beu & Verhecken, 2000

Species of gastropod

Loxotaphrus rosadoi is a species of sea snail, a marine gastropod mollusk in the family Cancellariidae, the nutmeg snails.
