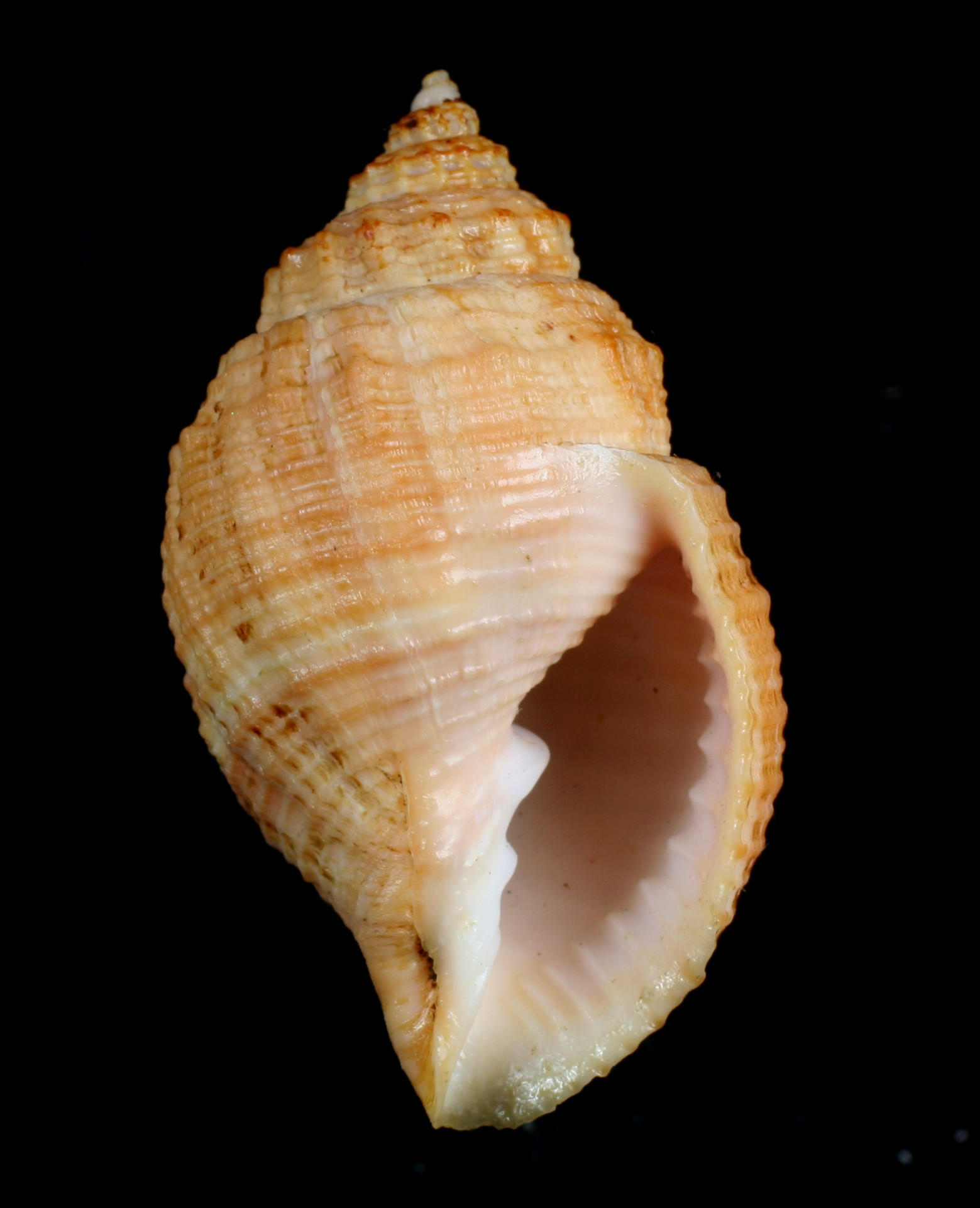
- Apertural view of shell of Euclia balboae (Pilsbry, 1931)

Scientific classification
- Kingdom: Animalia
- Phylum: Mollusca
- Class: Gastropoda
- Subclass: Caenogastropoda
- Order: Neogastropoda
- Family: Cancellariidae
- Genus: Euclia
- Species: E. balboae

Binomial name
- Euclia balboae (Pilsbry, 1931)

= Euclia balboae =

Species of gastropod

Euclia balboae is a species of sea snail, a marine gastropod mollusk in the family Cancellariidae, the nutmeg snails.
