= Gergovia (gastropod) =

Scientific classification
- Kingdom: Animalia
- Phylum: Mollusca
- Class: Gastropoda
- Subclass: Caenogastropoda
- Order: Neogastropoda
- Superfamily: Volutoidea
- Family: Cancellariidae
- Genus: †Gergovia; Cossmann, 1899

Type species
- † Cancellaria platypleura Tate, 1898

Synonyms
- † Merica (Gergovia) Cossmann, 1899 (original rank)

Species of gastropod

Gergovia is an extinct genus of sea snail, a marine gastropod mollusk in the family Cancellariidae, the nutmeg snails.

== Species ==
- † Gergovia laticostata (Tenison-Woods, 1880) (Miocene, Victoria, Australia)
- † Gergovia petiti Barros & S. Lima, 2007

Species brought into synonymy

- Gergovia haswelli Garrard, 1975: synonym of Microsveltia haswelli (Garrard, 1975) (original combination)
- † Gergovia platypleura (Tate, 1898): synonym of † Gergovia laticostata (Tenison-Woods, 1880)
