= Loxotaphrus =

Scientific classification
- Kingdom: Animalia
- Phylum: Mollusca
- Class: Gastropoda
- Subclass: Caenogastropoda
- Order: Neogastropoda
- Family: Cancellariidae
- Genus: Loxotaphrus; Harris, 1897

Type species
- Phos variciferus Tate, 1888

Genus of gastropods

Loxotaphrus is a genus of sea snails, marine gastropod mollusks in the family Cancellariidae, the nutmeg snails.

== Species ==
Species within the genus Loxotaphrus include:

- Loxotaphrus deshayesii (Duval, 1841)
- Loxotaphrus limpusi Beu & Verhecken, 2000
- Loxotaphrus rosadoi Beu & Verhecken, 2000
