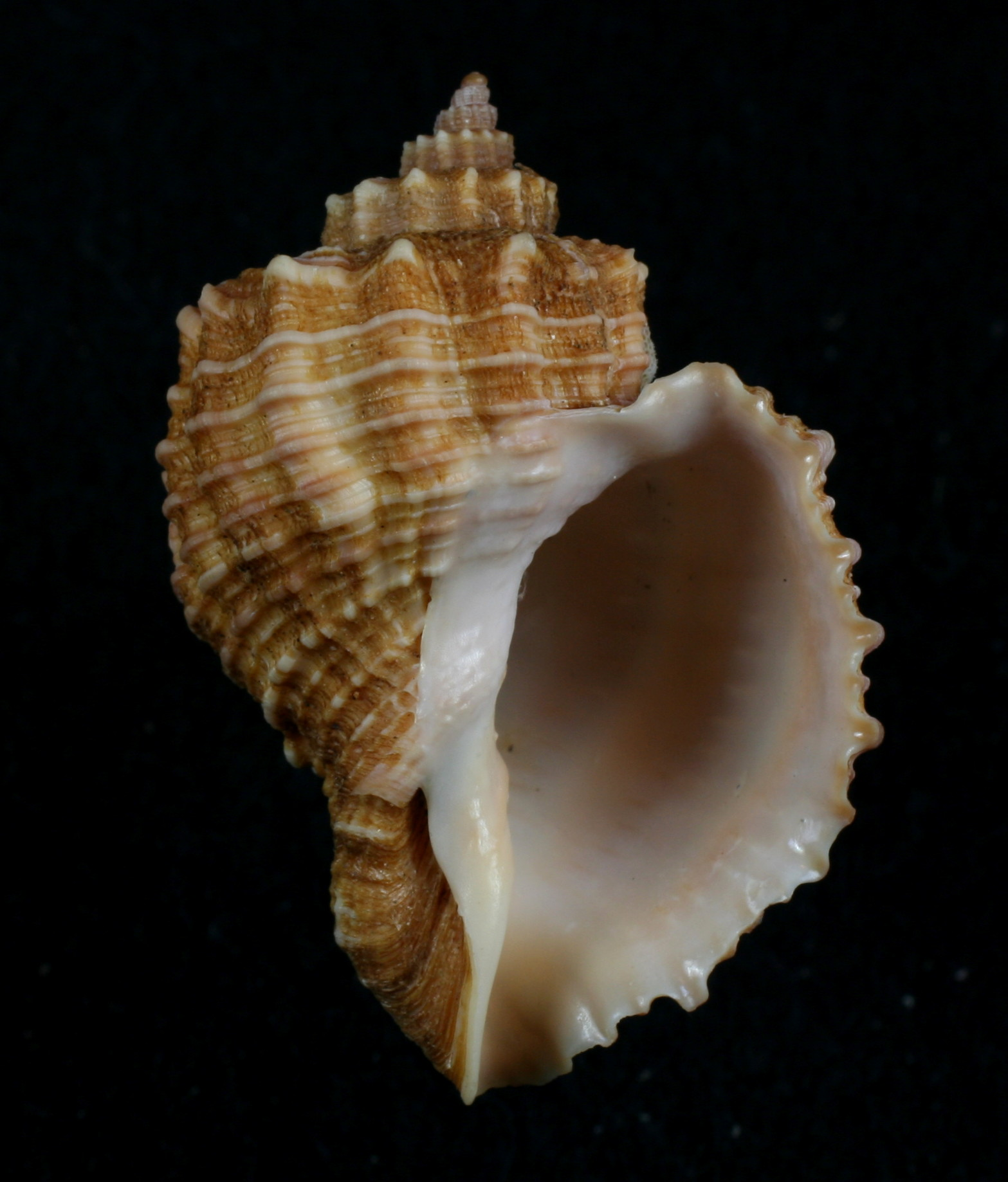
- Apertural view of shell of Habesolatia nodulifera (Sowerby, 1825)

Scientific classification
- Kingdom: Animalia
- Phylum: Mollusca
- Class: Gastropoda
- Subclass: Caenogastropoda
- Order: Neogastropoda
- Family: Cancellariidae
- Genus: Habesolatia; Kuroda, 1965

= Habesolatia =

Genus of molluscs

Habesolatia is a genus of sea snails, marine gastropod mollusks in the family Cancellariidae, the nutmeg snails.

== Species ==
Species within the genus Habesolatia include:

- Habesolatia nodulifera (Sowerby, 1825)
