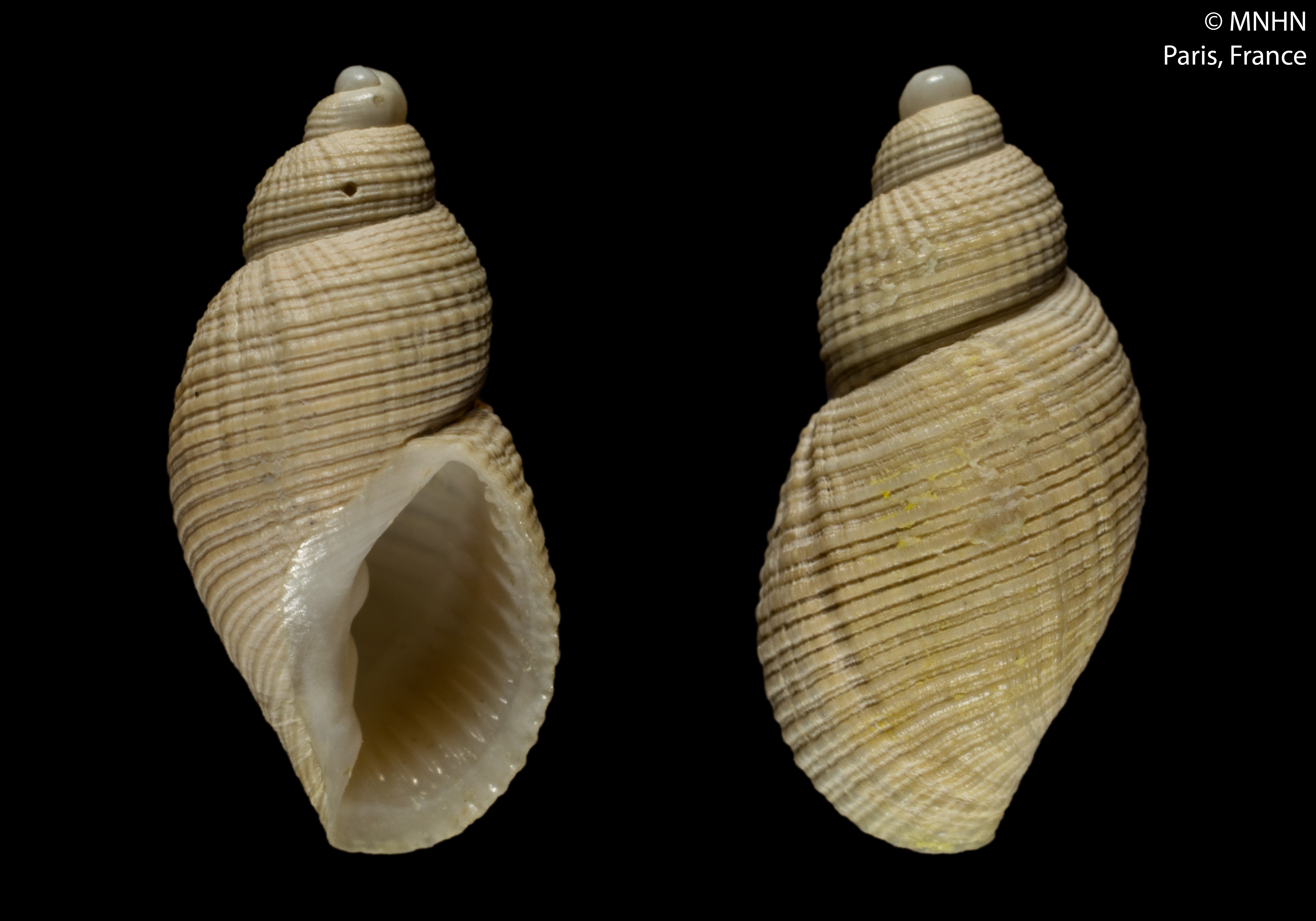
- Perplicaria boucheti

Scientific classification
- Kingdom: Animalia
- Phylum: Mollusca
- Class: Gastropoda
- Subclass: Caenogastropoda
- Order: Neogastropoda
- Superfamily: Volutoidea
- Family: Cancellariidae
- Genus: Perplicaria; Dall, 1890

Type species
- † Perplicaria perplexa Dall, 1890

= Perplicaria =

Genus of gastropods

Perplicaria is a genus of sea snails, marine Gastropod mollusks in the family Cancellariidae, the nutmeg snails.

== Species ==
Species within the genus Perplicaria include:

- † Perplicaria aquitanica (Peyrot, 1928)
- Perplicaria boucheti Verhecken, 1997
- Perplicaria clarki M. Smith, 1947
- Perplicaria laurensii (Grateloup, 1832)
- † Perplicaria mioquadrata (Sacco, 1894)
- † Perplicaria perplexa Dall, 1890
