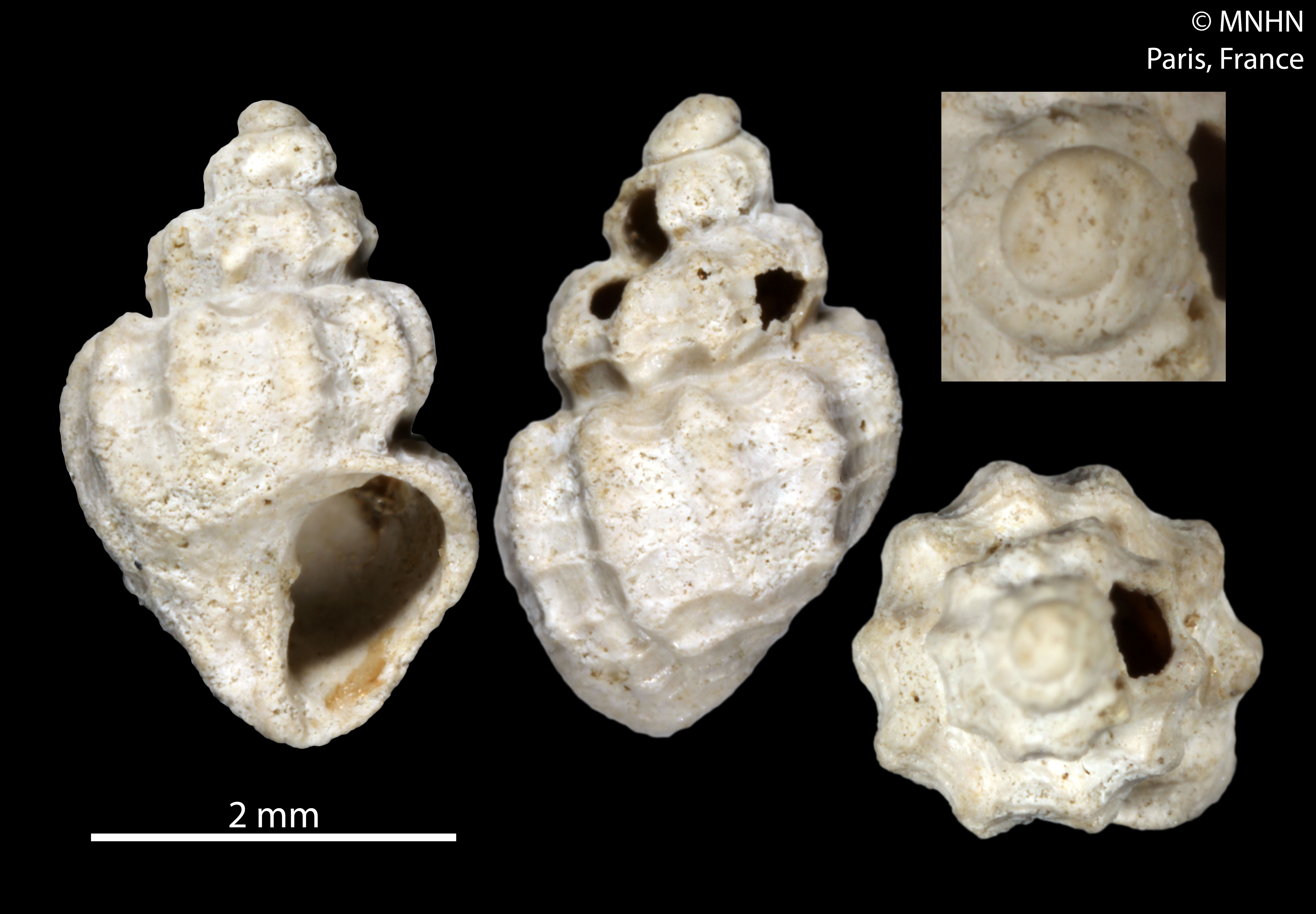
- Shell of Microsveltia humaboni (paratype at MNHN, Paris)

Scientific classification
- Kingdom: Animalia
- Phylum: Mollusca
- Class: Gastropoda
- Subclass: Caenogastropoda
- Order: Neogastropoda
- Superfamily: Volutoidea
- Family: Cancellariidae
- Genus: Microsveltia; Iredale, 1925

Type species
- Microsveltia recessa Iredale, 1925

= Microsveltia =

Genus of gastropods

Microsveltia is a genus of sea snails, marine gastropod mollusks in the family Cancellariidae, the nutmeg snails.

== Species ==
Species within the genus Microsveltia include:

- Microsveltia chihyehi S.-I Huang, M.-H. Lin, 2022
- Microsveltia chinglini S.-I Huang, M.-H. Lin, 2022
- Microsveltia chinhuii S.-I Huang & M.-H. Lin, 2021
- Microsveltia daili S.-I Huang, M.-H. Lin, 2022
- Microsveltia haswelli (Garrard, 1975)
- Microsveltia humaboni Verhecken, 2011
- Microsveltia ifengi S.-I Huang & M.-H. Lin, 2020
- Microsveltia insulaguishan S.-I Huang, M.-H. Lin, 2022
- Microsveltia karubar Verhecken, 1997
- Microsveltia laratensis Verhecken, 2011
- Microsveltia machaira Verhecken, 2011
- Microsveltia marisorientalis S.-I Huang, M.-H. Lin, 2022
- Microsveltia metivieri Verhecken, 1997
- Microsveltia patricia (Thiele, 1925)
- Microsveltia procerula Verhecken, 1997
- Microsveltia radii S.-I Huang & M.-H. Lin, 2021
- Microsveltia recessa Iredale, 1925
- Microsveltia sagamiensis (Kuroda & Habe, 1971)
- Microsveltia tupasi Verhecken, 2011
- Microsveltia wenderi S.-I Huang & M.-H. Lin, 2020
