= Vercomaris =

Scientific classification
- Kingdom: Animalia
- Phylum: Mollusca
- Class: Gastropoda
- Subclass: Caenogastropoda
- Order: Neogastropoda
- Family: Cancellariidae
- Genus: Vercomaris; Garrard, 1975

Genus of gastropods

Vercomaris is a genus of sea snails, marine gastropod mollusks in the family Cancellariidae, the nutmeg snails.

== Species ==
Species within the genus Vercomaris include:

- Vercomaris pergradata (Verco, 1904)
