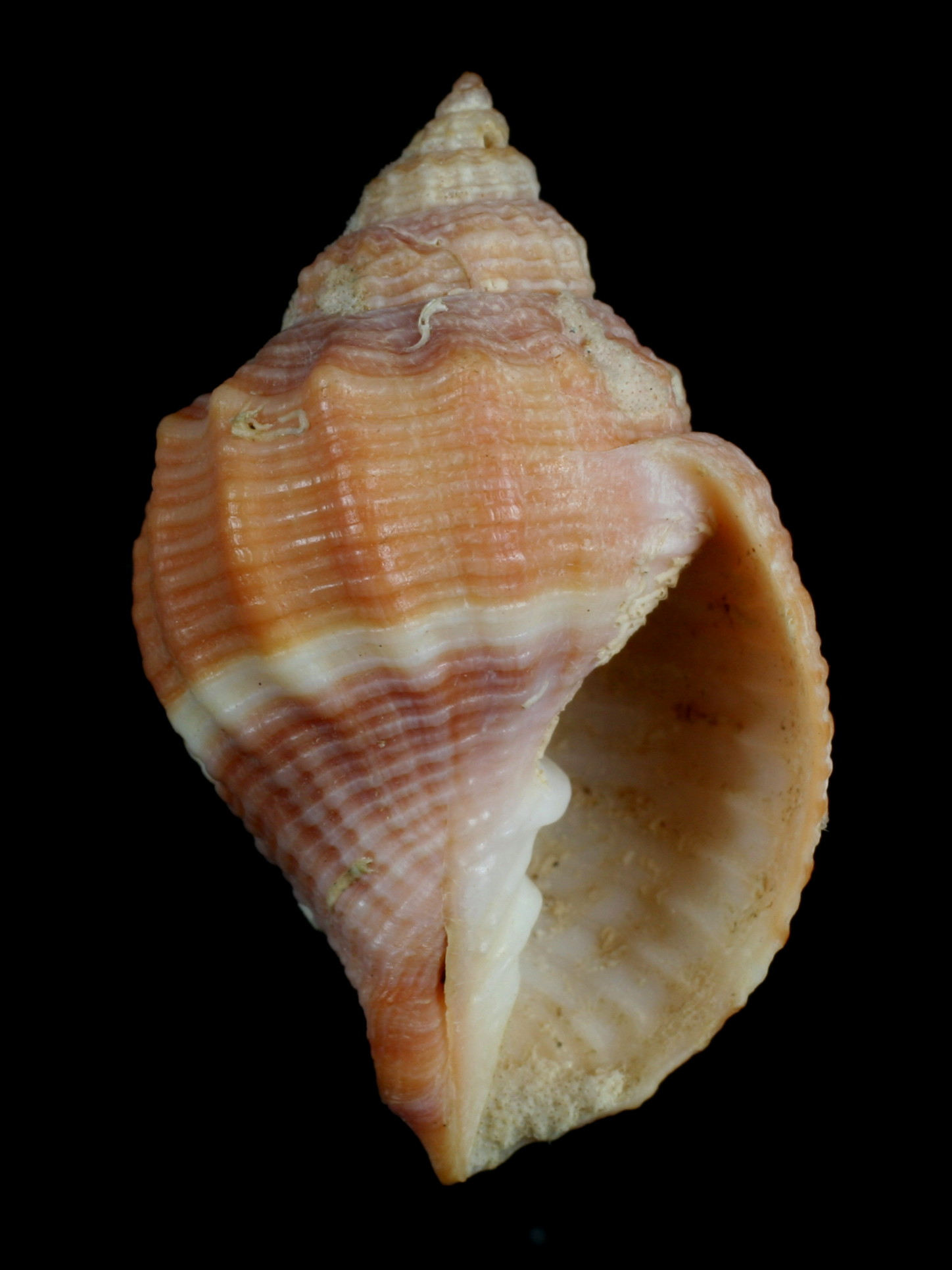
- Apertural view of shell of Euclia cassidiformis (Sowerby, 1832)

Scientific classification
- Kingdom: Animalia
- Phylum: Mollusca
- Class: Gastropoda
- Subclass: Caenogastropoda
- Order: Neogastropoda
- Family: Cancellariidae
- Genus: Euclia; H. Adams & A. Adams, 1854

= Euclia =

Genus of gastropods

Euclia is a genus of sea snails, marine gastropod mollusks in the family Cancellariidae, the nutmeg snails.

== Species ==
Species within the genus Habesolatia include:

- Euclia cassidiformis (Sowerby, 1832)
- Euclia balboae (Pilsbry, 1931)
- Euclia laurettae (Petit & Harasewych, 1998)
