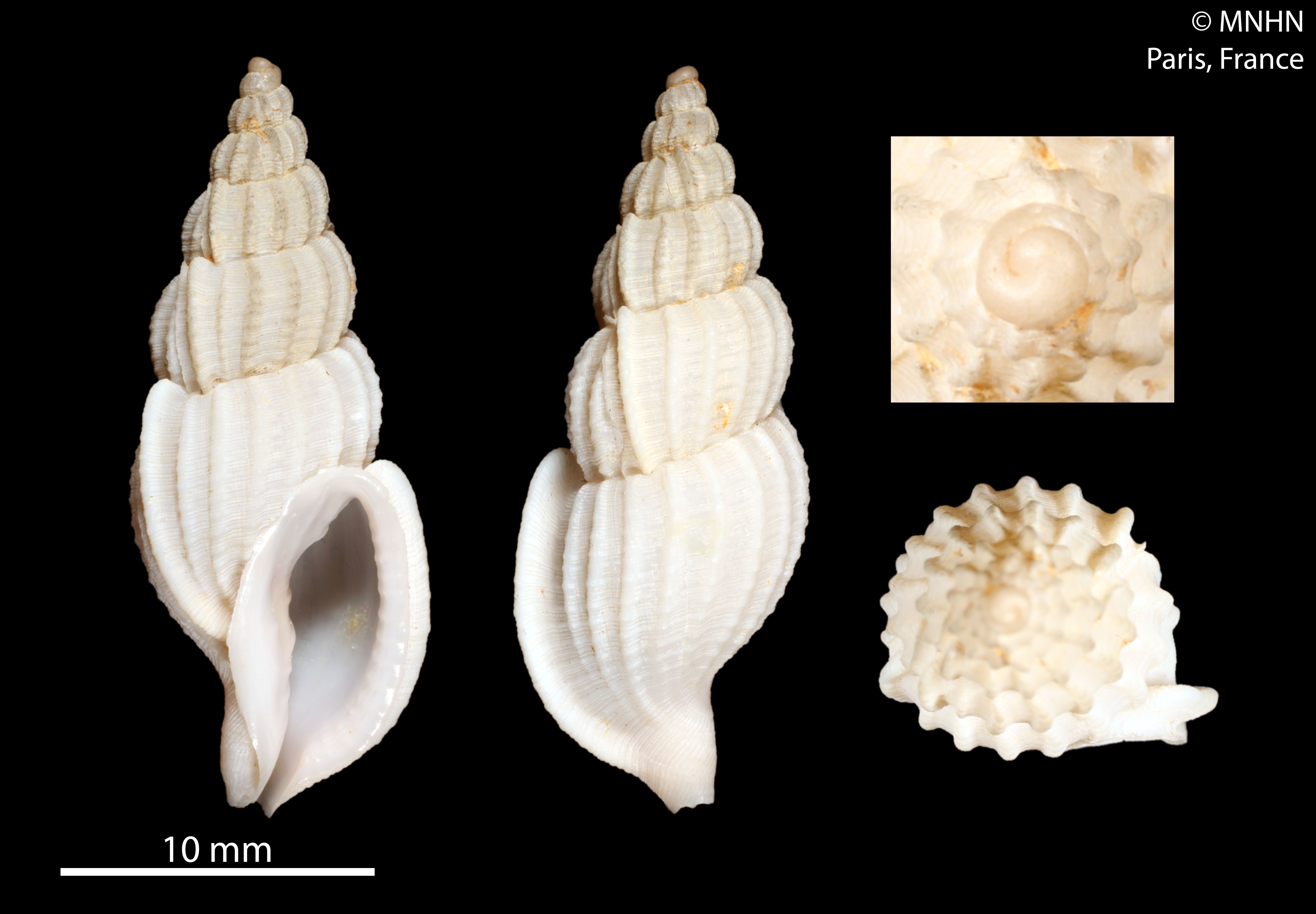
- Plesiotriton silinoensis

Scientific classification
- Kingdom: Animalia
- Phylum: Mollusca
- Class: Gastropoda
- Subclass: Caenogastropoda
- Order: Neogastropoda
- Superfamily: Volutoidea
- Family: Cancellariidae
- Genus: Plesiotriton; P. Fischer, 1884

Type species
- † Cancellaria volutella Lamarck, 1803

Synonyms
- Triton (Plesiotriton) P. Fischer, 1884 (original rank)

= Plesiotriton =

Genus of gastropods

Plesiotriton is a genus of sea snails, marine gastropod molluscs in the subfamily Plesiotritoninae of the family Cancellariidae, the nutmeg snails.

== Species ==
Species within the genus Plesiotriton include:

- † Plesiotriton angustus (Watelet, 1851)
- † Plesiotriton aucoini Lesport, Cluzaud & Verhecken, 2015
- † Plesiotriton cailloelensis Pacaud, Ledon & Loubry, 2015
- † Plesiotriton calciatus Pacaud, Ledon & Loubry, 2015
- † Plesiotriton camiadeorum Lesport, Cluzaud & Verhecken, 2015
- † Plesiotriton cedri (J. Gardner, 1935)
- † Plesiotriton clandestinus Pacaud, Ledon & Loubry, 2015
- † Plesiotriton cretaceus Sohl, 1960
- † Plesiotriton evanesco Pacaud, Ledon & Loubry, 2015
- † Plesiotriton ganensis Lesport, Cluzaud & Verhecken, 2015
- † Plesiotriton hillegondae (Martin, 1914)
- † Plesiotriton imbricatus (Dareste de la Chavanne, 1910)
- † Plesiotriton jacquesponsi Pacaud, Ledon & Loubry, 2015
- † Plesiotriton latus (Dareste de la Chavanne, 1910)
- Plesiotriton mirabilis Beu & Maxwell, 1987
- Plesiotriton silinoensis Verhecken, 2011
- † Plesiotriton steni Schnetler & Petit, 2006
- † Plesiotriton teuleraensis Lesport, Cluzaud & Verhecken, 2015
- Plesiotriton vivus Habe & Okutani, 1981
- † Plesiotriton vokesae (Allen, 1970)
- † Plesiotriton volutellus (Lamarck, 1803)

Species brought into synonymy

- † Plesiotriton deshayesianus Beu & Maxwell, 1987: synonym of † Colubratriton deshayesianus (Beu & Maxwell, 1987) (original combination)
- † Plesiotriton (Turehua) Marwick, 1943: synonym of † Turehua Marwick, 1943
