= Fusiaphera =

Scientific classification
- Kingdom: Animalia
- Phylum: Mollusca
- Class: Gastropoda
- Subclass: Caenogastropoda
- Order: Neogastropoda
- Family: Cancellariidae
- Genus: Fusiaphera; Habe, 1961

Genus of gastropods

Fusiaphera is a genus of sea snails, marine gastropod mollusks in the family Cancellariidae, the nutmeg snails.

== Species ==
Species within the genus Fusiaphera include:

- Fusiaphera macrospira (A. Adams & Reeve, 1850)

Synonyms

- Fusiaphera azumai Habe, 1961: synonym of Fusiaphera macrospira (A. Adams & Reeve, 1850)
- Fusiaphera dampierensis Garrard, 1975: synonym of Fusiaphera macrospira (A. Adams & Reeve, 1850)
- Fusiaphera eva Petit, 1980: synonym of Fusiaphera macrospira (A. Adams & Reeve, 1850)
- Fusiaphera exquisita (Preston, 1905): synonym of Fusiaphera macrospira (A. Adams & Reeve, 1850)
- Fusiaphera macrospiratoides Habe, 1961: synonym of Fusiaphera macrospira (A. Adams & Reeve, 1850)
- Fusiaphera pallida (E.A. Smith, 1899a): synonym of Fusiaphera macrospira (A. Adams & Reeve, 1850)
- Fusiaphera tosaensis (Habe, 1961): synonym of Fusiaphera macrospira (A. Adams & Reeve, 1850)
