= Crawfordina =

Scientific classification
- Kingdom: Animalia
- Phylum: Mollusca
- Class: Gastropoda
- Subclass: Caenogastropoda
- Order: Neogastropoda
- Family: Cancellariidae
- Genus: Crawfordina; Dall, 1919

Type species
- Cancellaria crawfordiana Dall, 1891

Species
- See text

Synonyms
- Cancellaria (Crawfordina) Dall, 1919; Crawfordia Dall, 1918 (invalid: junior homonym of Crawfordia Pierce, 1908: Crawfordina is a replacement name)

Genus of gastropods

Crawfordina is a genus of medium-sized sea snails, marine gastropod molluscs in the family Cancellariidae, the nutmeg snails.

== Species ==
According to the World Register of Marine Species (WoRMS), the following species with valid names are within the genus Crawfordina :

- Crawfordina crawfordiana Dall, 1891
- Crawfordina stuardoi McLean, J.H. & Andrade, 1982
