= Cancellaphera =

Scientific classification
- Kingdom: Animalia
- Phylum: Mollusca
- Class: Gastropoda
- Subclass: Caenogastropoda
- Order: Neogastropoda
- Family: Cancellariidae
- Genus: Cancellaphera; Iredale, 1930

Genus of gastropods

Cancellaphera is a genus of sea snails, marine gastropod mollusks in the family Cancellariidae, the nutmeg snails.

== Species ==
Species within the genus Cancellaphera include:

- Cancellaphera amasia Iredale, 1930
