= Microsveltia haswelli =

Scientific classification
- Kingdom: Animalia
- Phylum: Mollusca
- Class: Gastropoda
- Subclass: Caenogastropoda
- Order: Neogastropoda
- Family: Cancellariidae
- Genus: Microsveltia
- Species: M. haswelli

Binomial name
- Microsveltia haswelli (Garrard, 1975)

Synonyms
- Gergovia haswelli

Species of gastropod

Microsveltia haswelli is a species of sea snail, a marine gastropod mollusc in the family Cancellariidae, the nutmeg snails.
