= Félix Pierre Jousseaume =

French malacologist (1835–1921)

- Born: 12 April 1835; Charente-Maritime, France
- Died: 3 November 1921 (aged 86)
- Known for: La Philosophie aux prises avec la Mer Rouge, le darwinisme et les 3 règnes des corps organisés (hilosophy in relation to the Red Sea, Darwinism, and the three kingdoms of organisms, 1899)
- Scientific career
- Fields: Medicine, zoology, malacology
- Thesis: Des Végétaux parasites de l'Homme (Vegetable parasites of man)

Félix Pierre Jousseaume (French pronunciation: [feliks pjɛʁ ʒusom]; 12 April 1835 in Charente-Maritime – 3 November 1921) was a French zoologist and malacologist. He studied medicine in Paris where he then practised. His thesis was Des Végétaux parasites de l'Homme. He participated in the founding of the Société zoologique de France and was President of that society in 1878.

After 1890 he abandoned his practice to study malacology. He made many trips to the Red Sea, giving his collections to the Muséum national d'histoire naturelle.

Jousseaume wrote many short scientific papers mainly published in Naturaliste, revue illustrée des sciences naturelles, les Nouvelles archives des missions scientifiques et littéraires, la Revue et magasin de zoologie, and le Bulletin de la Société zoologique de France. He also wrote in 1899 La Philosophie aux prises avec la Mer Rouge, le darwinisme et les 3 règnes des corps organisés (A. Maloine, Paris : xii + 559 p.), in 1907 De l'Attraction et autres joyeusetés de la science (A. Maloine, Paris : 160 p.) and in 1914 Impressions de voyage en Apharras [Texte imprimé], anthropologie, philosophie, morale d'un peuple errant berger et guerrier (J.-B. Baillière et fils, Paris, deux volumes : xviii + 700 et 575 p.).

== See also ==
- Category:Taxa named by Félix Pierre Jousseaume

== Taxa ==
Taxa named in his honor include two genera and several species:

- Jousseaumea Sacco, 1894
- Jousseaumiella Bourne, 1907
- Metis jusseaumei (Richard)
- Amphibetaeus jousseaumei Coutière, 1896
- Neocallichirus jousseaumei (Nobili, 1904)
- Murex jousseaumei Poirier, 1883
- Chlamys jousseaumei Bavay, 1904
- Cerithiopsis jousseaumei Jay & Drivas, 2002
- Clathrosansonia jousseaumei (Bavai, 1921)

== Works ==
- Coquilles de la famille des marginelles (1875)
