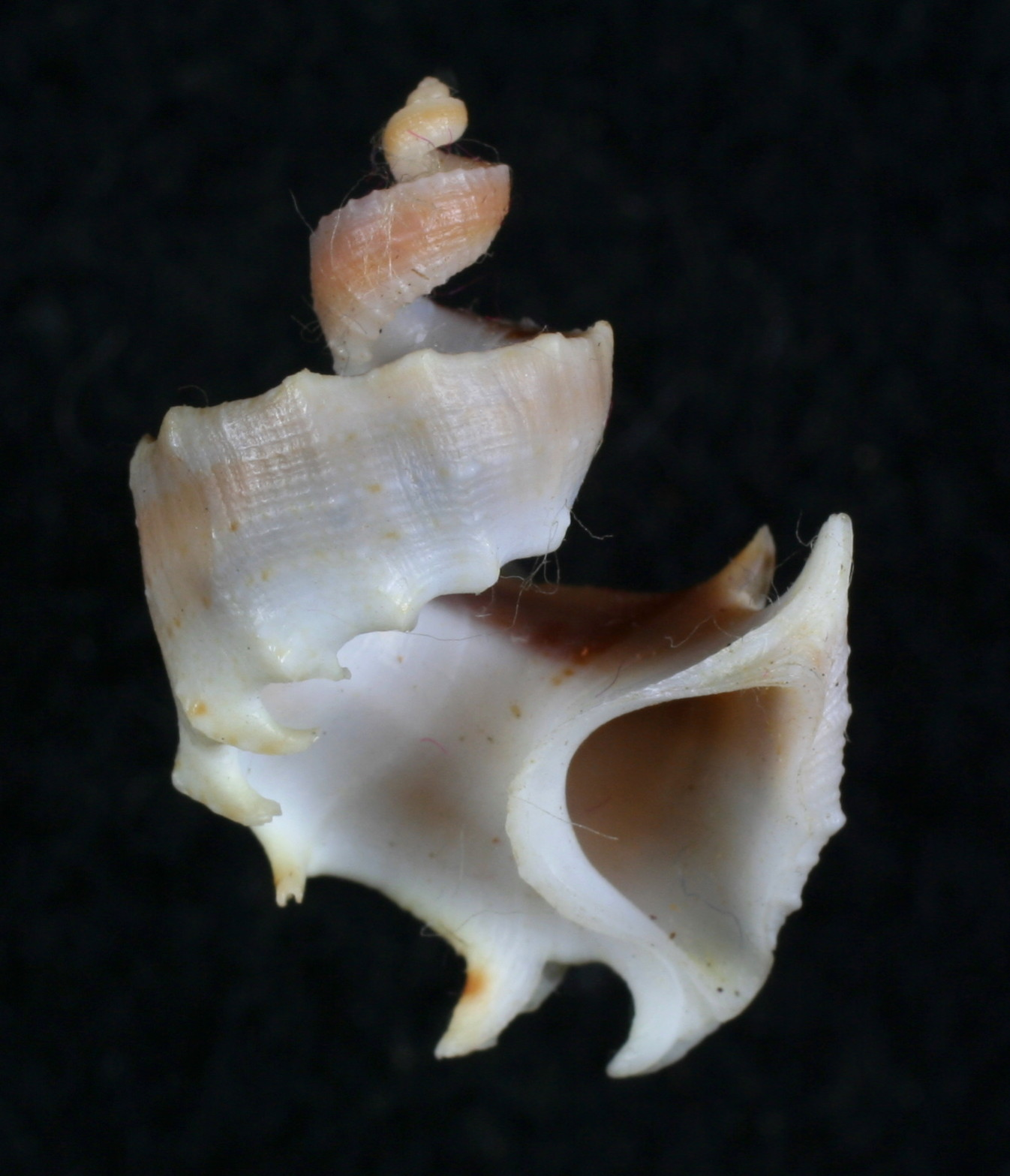
- Apertural view of Trigonostoma milleri Burch, 1949

Scientific classification
- Kingdom: Animalia
- Phylum: Mollusca
- Class: Gastropoda
- Subclass: Caenogastropoda
- Order: Neogastropoda
- Superfamily: Volutoidea
- Family: Cancellariidae; Forbes & Hanley, 1851

Genera
- See text

= Cancellariidae =

Family of sea snails

Cancellariidae, common name the nutmeg snails or nutmeg shells, are a family of small to medium-large sea snails, marine gastropod mollusks in the clade Neogastropoda. Some of the shells of the species in this family resemble a nutmeg seed.

== Distribution ==
This family occurs worldwide. Many species are found in deep water.

== Taxonomy ==
This family consists of three following subfamilies (according to the taxonomy of the Gastropoda by Bouchet & Rocroi, 2005):

- Cancellariinae Forbes & Hanley, 1851 - synonym: Trigonostomatinae Cossmann, 1899
- Admetinae Troschel, 1865 - synonym: Paladmetidae Stephenson, 1941
- Plesiotritoninae Beu & Maxwell, 1937

== Genera ==
Genera in the family Cancellariidae include:

- Admete Krøyer, 1842
- Admetula Cossmann, 1889
- Africotriton Beu & Marshall, 1987
- Agatrix R. Petit, 1967
- Aphera Adams & Adams, 1854
- Arizelostoma Iredale, 1936
- Axelella Petit, 1988
- Bivetia Jousseaume, 1887
- Bivetiella Wenz, 1943
- Bivetopsia Jousseaume, 1887
- Bonellitia Jousseaume, 1887
- Brocchinia Jousseaume, 1887
- Cancellaphera Iredale, 1930
- Cancellaria Lamarck, 1799
- Cancellicula Tabanelli, 2008
- Crawfordina Dall, 1919
- Euclia Adams & Adams, 1854
- Fusiaphera Habe, 1961
- Gerdiella Olsson and Bayer, 1972
- Gergovia Cossmann, 1899
- Habesolatia Kuroda, 1965
- Hertleinia Marks, 1949
- Inglisella Finlay, 1924
- Iphinopsis Dall, 1924
- Loxotaphrus Harris, 1897
- Massyla Adams & Adams, 1854
- Merica Adams & Adams, 1854
- Mericella Thiele, 1929
- Microcancilla Dall, 1924
- Microsveltia Iredale, 1925
- Mirandaphera Bouchet & Petit, 2002
- Momoebora Kuroda & Habe, 1971
- Narona Adams & Adams, 1854
- Neadmete Habe, 1961
- Nevia Jousseaume, 1887
- Nipponaphera Habe, 1961
- Nothoadmete Oliver, 1982
- Paladmete Gardner, 1916
- Pallidonia Laseron, 1955
- Pepta Iredale, 1925
- Perplicaria Dall, 1890
- Pisanella Koenen, 1865
- Plesiotriton Fischer, 1884
- Progabbia Dall, 1918
- Pseudobabylonella Brunetti, Della Bella, Forli & Vecchi, 2009
- Pyruclia Olsson, 1932
- Scalptia Jousseaume, 1887
- Solatia Jousseaume, 1887
- Solutosveltia Habe, 1961
- Sveltella Cossmann, 1889
- Sveltia Jousseaume, 1887
- Sydaphera Iredale, 1929
- Tribia Jousseaume, 1887
- Trigona Perry, 1811
- Trigonaphera Iredale, 1936
- Trigonostoma de Blainville, 1825
- Tritonium Fabricius, 1780
- Tritonoharpa Dall, 1908
- Unitas Palmer, 1947
- Ventrilia Jousseaume, 1887
- Vercomaris Garrard, 1975
- Waipaoa Marwick, 1931
- Zeadmete Finlay, 1926

The following genus was also accepted in 1936 by the Royal Society of New Zealand

- Anapepta Finlay, 1930
