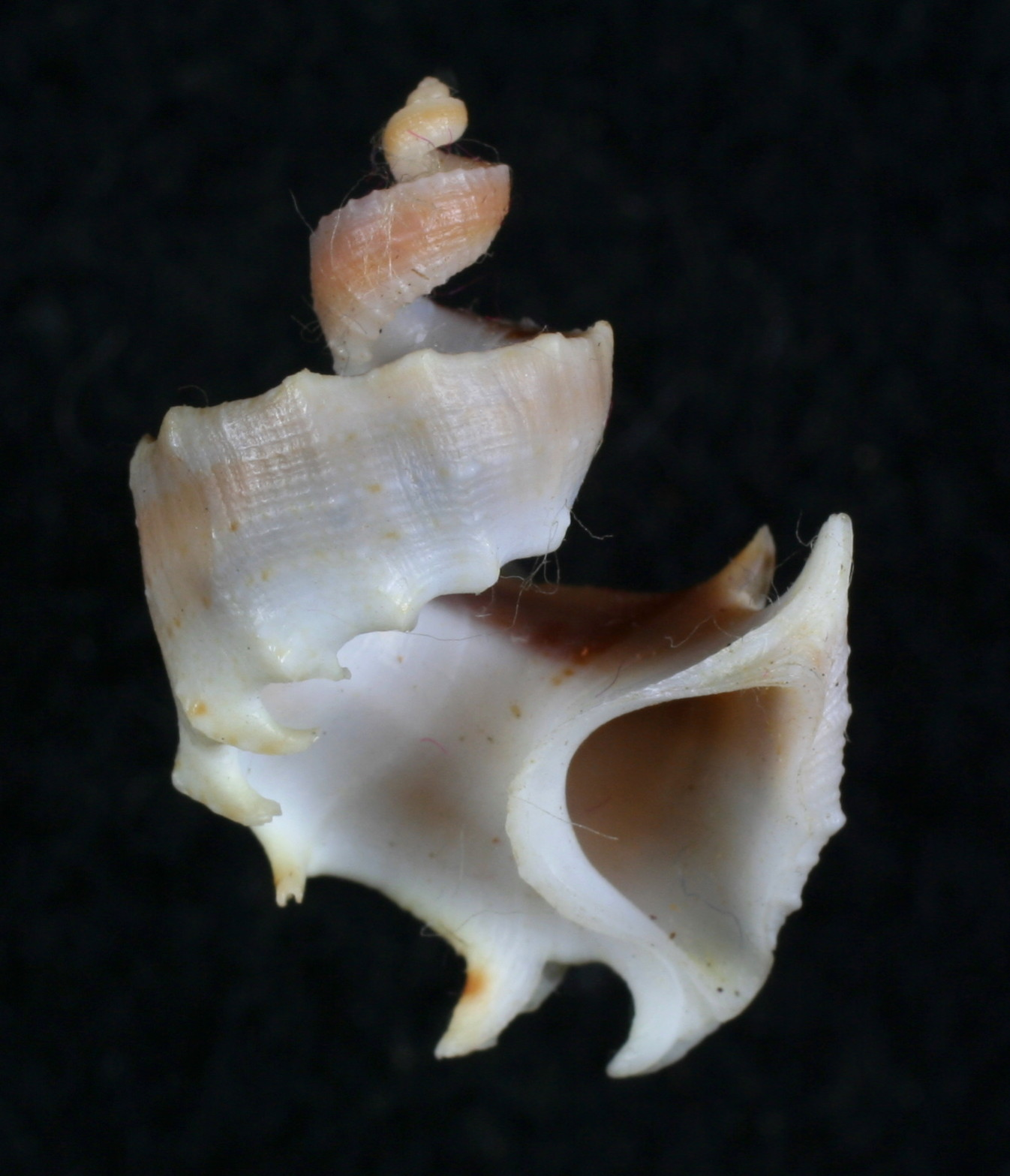
- Apertural view of shell of Trigonostoma milleri Burch, 1949

Scientific classification
- Kingdom: Animalia
- Phylum: Mollusca
- Class: Gastropoda
- Subclass: Caenogastropoda
- Order: Neogastropoda
- Family: Cancellariidae
- Genus: Trigonostoma; Blainville, 1825

Type species
- Delphinula trigonostoma Lamarck, 1822

Synonyms
- Arizelostoma Iredale, 1936; Cancellaria (Trigonostoma) Blainville, 1827; Extractrix Korobkov, 1955; Trigona Perry, 1811 (Invalid: junior homonym of Trigona Jurine, 1807 [Hymenoptera])

= Trigonostoma =

Genus of gastropods

Trigonostoma is a genus of sea snails, marine gastropod mollusks in the family Cancellariidae, the nutmeg snails.

Trigonostoma is also the name given to a trematode genus in the family Aspidogastridae, that is actually a synonym of the genus Multicalyx Faust & Tang, 1936

== Species ==
According to the World Register of Marine Species (WoRMS) the following species with valid names are included within the genus Trigonostoma :

- † Trigonostoma ampullaceum (Brocchi, 1814)
- Trigonostoma antiquatum (Hinds, 1843) - antique nutmeg
- † Trigonostoma barnardi A. W. Janssen, 1984
- Trigonostoma breve (G.B. Sowerby I, 1832a)
- Trigonostoma bullatum (G.B. Sowerby I, 1832a) - bubble nutmeg
- Trigonostoma chui Yen, 1936
- Trigonostoma diamantinum Garrard, 1975
- Trigonostoma elegantulum (M. Smith, 1947) little elegant nutmeg
- † Trigonostoma exampullaceum (Sacco, 1894)
- † Trigonostoma exgeslini (Sacco, 1894)
- † Trigonostoma extractrix (Boettger, 1906)
- Trigonostoma gofasi Verhecken, 2007
- Trigonostoma goniostoma (G.B. Sowerby I, 1832a) - angle-mouth nutmeg
- Trigonostoma iota Garrard, 1975
- Trigonostoma kilburni Petit & Harasewych, 2000
- Trigonostoma lamberti (Souverbie, 1870 in Souverbie & Montrouzier)
- Trigonostoma laseroni (Iredale, 1936) - Laseron's nutmeg
- † Trigonostoma lindeni A. W. Janssen, 1984
- Trigonostoma milleri (Burch, 1949) - Miller's nutmeg
- Trigonostoma mozambicense Petit & Harasewych, 2002
- Trigonostoma nitidum (A. Adams, 1855)
- † Trigonostoma parvotriangula Sacco, 1894
- † Trigonostoma protrigonostoma (Sacco, 1894)
- † Trigonostoma pseudumbilicare Peyrot, 1928
- Trigonostoma pygmaeum (C.B. Adams, 1852)
- Trigonostoma rugosum (Lamarck, 1822)
- Trigonostoma scala (Gmelin, 1791)
- Trigonostoma scalare (Gmelin, 1791)
- † Trigonostoma schroeckingeri (R. Hoernes & Auinger, 1890)
- Trigonostoma semidisjunctum (G.B. Sowerby II, 1849a) - disjunct nutmeg
- † Trigonostoma subsuturale (d'Orbigny, 1852)
- Trigonostoma tenerum (Philippi, 1848) - Philippi's nutmeg
- Trigonostoma tessella Garrard, 1975
- Trigonostoma thysthlon Petit & Harasewych, 1987
- Trigonostoma tryblium Bouchet & Petit, 2008
- Trigonostoma tuberculosum (G.B. Sowerby I, 1832a)
- † Trigonostoma umbilicare (Brocchi, 1814)

Subgenus Trigonostoma Blainville, 1825

- Trigonostoma pellucida - triangular nutmeg

Species brought into synonymy

- Trigonostoma bicolor (Hinds, 1843) : synonym of Scalptia bicolor (Hinds, 1843)
- Trigonostoma campbelli Shasky, 1961 accepted as Axelella campbelli (Shasky, 1961)
- † Trigonostoma christiei Finlay, 1924 accepted as † Scalptia christiei (Finlay, 1924)
- Trigonostoma costiferum (G.B. Sowerby I, 1832): synonym of Scalptia costifera (G. B. Sowerby I, 1832)
- Trigonostoma damasoi T. Cossignani, 2015 accepted as Trigonostoma gofasi Verhecken, 2007
- Trigonostoma foveolata [sic]: synonym of Scalptia foveolata (G.B. Sowerby II, 1849)
- Trigonostoma rugosum (Lamarck, 1822) accepted as Bivetopsia rugosa (Lamarck, 1822)
- Trigonostoma scalariformis (Lamarck, 1822) accepted as Scalptia scalariformis (Lamarck, 1822)
- Trigonostoma semidisjuncta [sic]: synonym of Trigonostoma semidisjunctum (G.B. Sowerby II, 1849)
- † Trigonostoma thisbe Olsson, 1964 accepted as † Ventrilia thisbe (Olsson, 1964)
- † Trigonostoma triumpha Olsson, 1964 accepted as † Ventrilia triumpha (Olsson, 1964)
- Trigonostoma tuberculosa [sic]: synonym of Trigonostoma tuberculosum (G.B. Sowerby I, 1832)
- Trigonostoma vinnulum Iredale, 1925: synonym of Trigonaphera vinnulum (Iredale, 1925) (original combination)
- † Trigonostoma waikaiaensis Finlay, 1924 accepted as † Scalptia waikaiaensis (Finlay, 1924)
