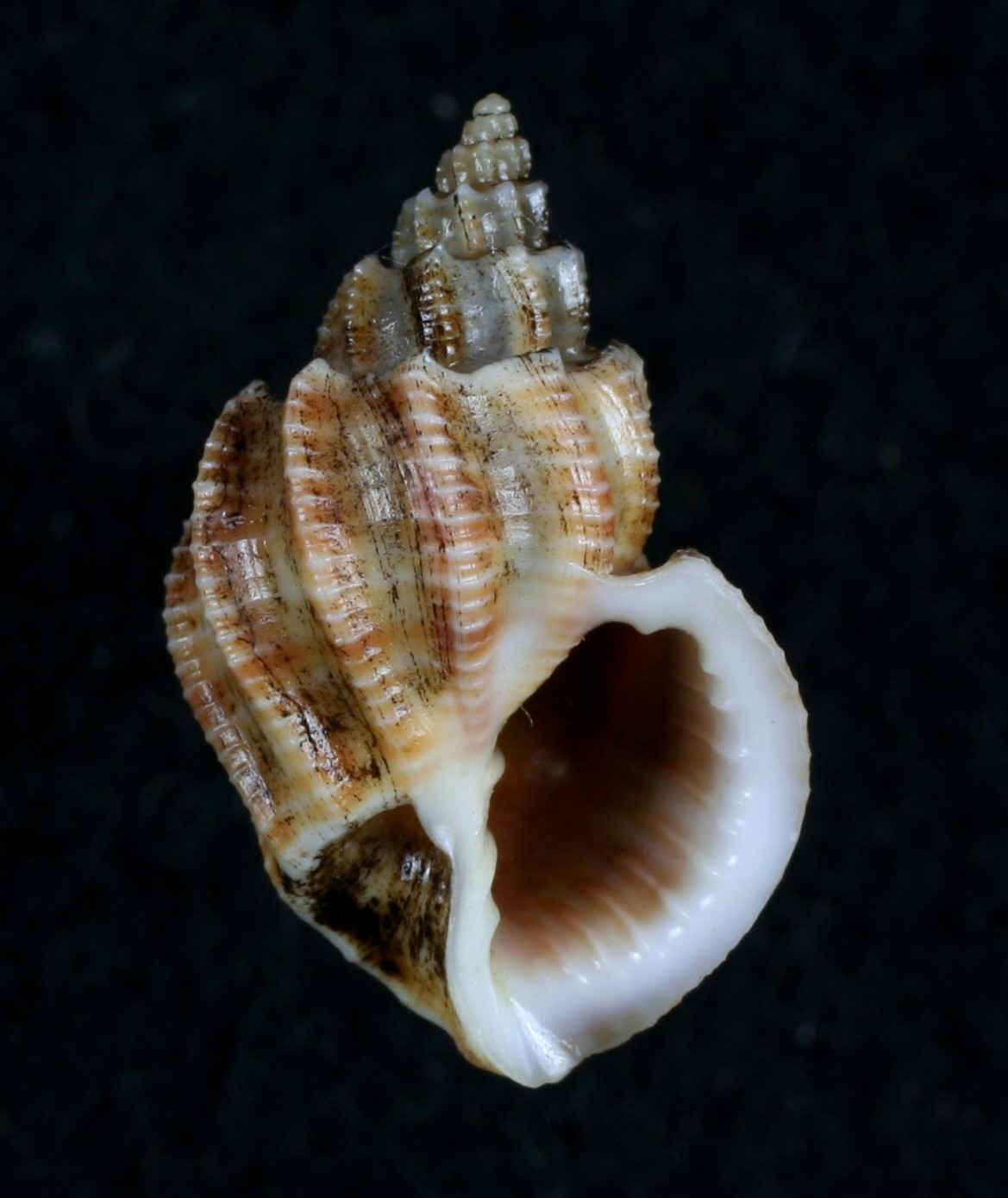
- Apertural view of shell of Scalptia scalarina (Lamarck, 1822)

Scientific classification
- Kingdom: Animalia
- Phylum: Mollusca
- Class: Gastropoda
- Subclass: Caenogastropoda
- Order: Neogastropoda
- Superfamily: Volutoidea
- Family: Cancellariidae
- Genus: Scalptia; Jousseaume, 1887

Type species
- Cancellaria obliquata Lamarck, 1822

= Scalptia =

Genus of gastropods

Scalptia is a genus of sea snails, marine gastropod mollusks in the family Cancellariidae, the nutmeg snails.

== Species ==
Species within the genus Scalptia include:

- Scalptia aliguayensis Verhecken, 2008
- Scalptia androyensis Verhecken & Bozzetti, 2006
- Scalptia articularoides Verhecken, 1995
- † Scalptia atjehensis (Oostingh, 1938)
- Scalptia bicolor (Hinds, 1843)
- † Scalptia burdigalensis (Peyrot, 1928)
- † Scalptia christiei (Finlay, 1924)
- Scalptia contabulata (G.B. Sowerby I, 1832)
- Scalptia costifera (G. B. Sowerby I, 1832)
- Scalptia crenifera (G.B. Sowerby I, 1832)
- Scalptia crispa (G.B. Sowerby I, 1832)
- Scalptia crispatoides Verhecken, 2008
- Scalptia crossei (Semper, 1861)
- Scalptia delsaerdti Verhecken, 2020
- † Scalptia dertocosticillata (Sacco, 1894)
- † Scalptia dertoparva (Sacco, 1894) †
- Scalptia foveolata (G.B. Sowerby II, 1849)
- Scalptia gorii Verhecken, 2020
- † Scalptia gradata (Hörnes, 1854)
- Scalptia harmulensis Verhecken & Van Laethem, 2015
- † Scalptia haweraensis (Laws, 1940)
- † Scalptia hidasensis (Hoernes & Auinger, 1890)
- Scalptia hystrix (Reeve, 1856)
- † Scalptia kaiparaensis (Laws, 1939)
- Scalptia laingensis Verhecken, 1989
- † Scalptia maoria (P. Marshall & Murdoch, 1921)
- † Scalptia menadensis (Schepman, 1907)
- Scalptia larissaensis Verhecken, 2020
- Scalptia mercadoi Old, 1968
- † Scalptia michelinii (Bellardi, 1841)
- Scalptia nassa (Gmelin, 1791)
- † Scalptia nemethi Kovács & Vicián, 2021
- † Scalptia neugeboreni (Hörnes, 1856)
- Scalptia obliquata (Lamarck, 1822)
- † Scalptia polonica (Pusch, 1837)
- † Scalptia problematica Landau, Harzhauser, İslamoğlu & da Silva, 2013
- † Scalptia pukeuriensis (Finlay, 1930)
- Scalptia rashafunensis Verhecken, 2020
- Scalptia richardi Verhecken & Van Laethem, 2015
- Scalptia scalariformis (Lamarck, 1822)
- Scalptia scalarina (Lamarck, 1822)
- Scalptia scalata (G.B. Sowerby I, 1832)
- † Scalptia scrobiculata (Hörnes, 1854)
- Scalptia souverbiei (Crosse, 1868)
- † Scalptia spinosa (Grateloup, 1827)
- † Scalptia tegalensis (Oostingh, 1938)
- Scalptia tenuis (A. Adams, 1855)
- Scalptia textilis (Kiener, 1841)
- Scalptia vangoethemi Verhecken, 1995
- † Scalptia verheckeni Harzhauser, Raven & Landau, 2018
- Scalptia verreauxii (Kiener, 1841)
- † Scalptia waikaiaensis (Finlay, 1924)

Taxon inquirendum

- † Scalptia articularis (G. B. Sowerby I, 1832)

Species brought into synonymy

- Scalptia lamberti (Souverbie, 1870): synonym of Trigonostoma lamberti (Souverbie in Souverbie & Montrouzier, 1870)
- Scalptia macconkeyi Jousseaume, 1894: synonym of Scalptia hystrix (Reeve, 1856)
- Scalptia nodosivaricosa (Petush, 1979): synonym of Nipponaphera nodosivaricosa (Petuch, 1979)
- Scalptia scala (Gmelin, 1791): synonym of Trigonostoma scala (Gmelin, 1791)
- Scalptia vinnulum (Iredale, 1925): synonym of Trigonaphera vinnulum (Iredale, 1925)
