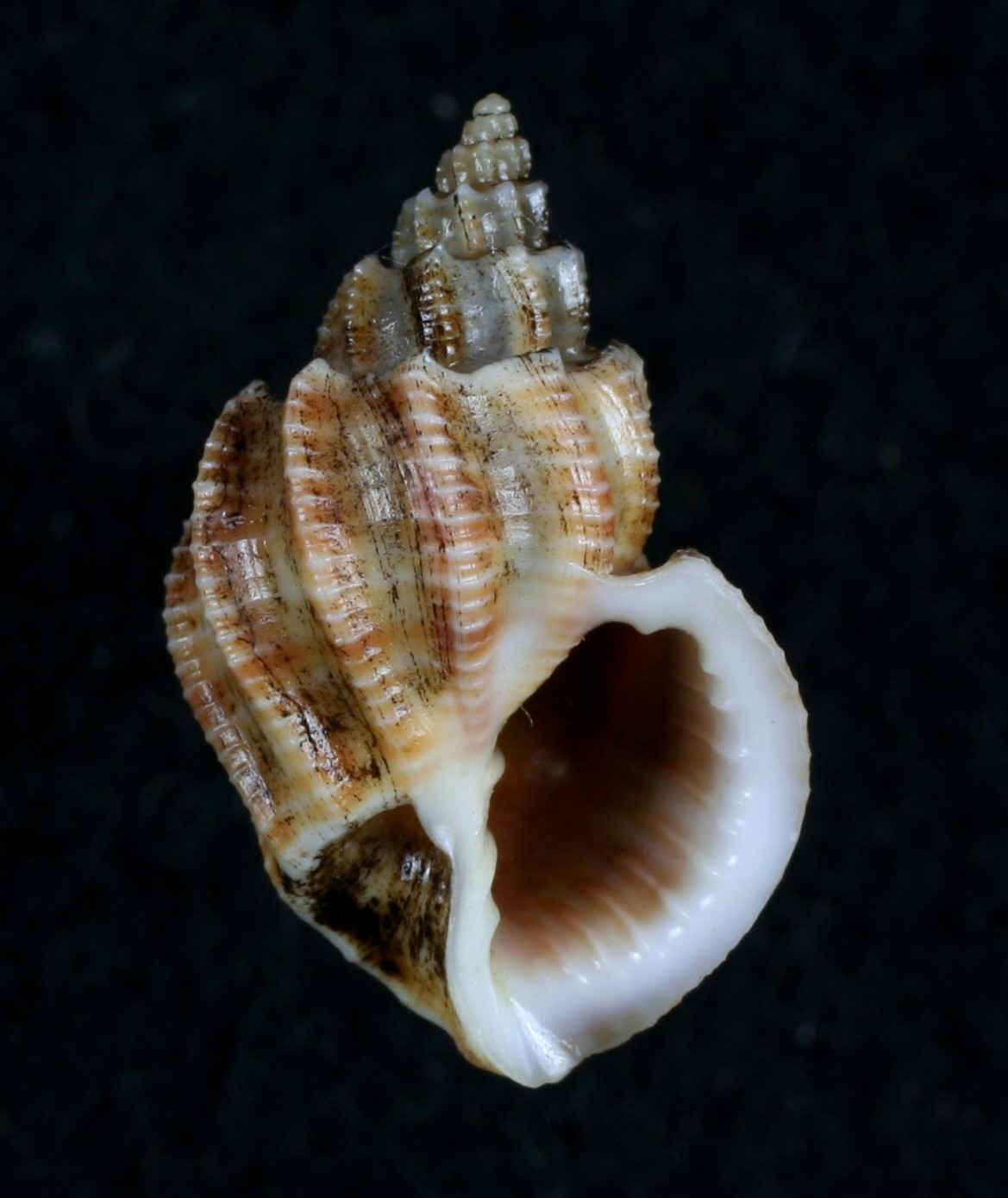
- Apertural view of shell of Scalptia scalarina (Lamarck 1822)

Scientific classification
- Kingdom: Animalia
- Phylum: Mollusca
- Class: Gastropoda
- Subclass: Caenogastropoda
- Order: Neogastropoda
- Family: Cancellariidae
- Genus: Scalptia
- Species: S. scalarina

Binomial name
- Scalptia scalarina (Lamarck, 1822b)

Synonyms
- Cancellaria scalarina Lamarck, 1822b

= Scalptia scalarina =

Species of gastropod

Scalptia scalarina is a species of sea snail, a marine gastropod mollusk in the family Cancellariidae, the nutmeg snails.
