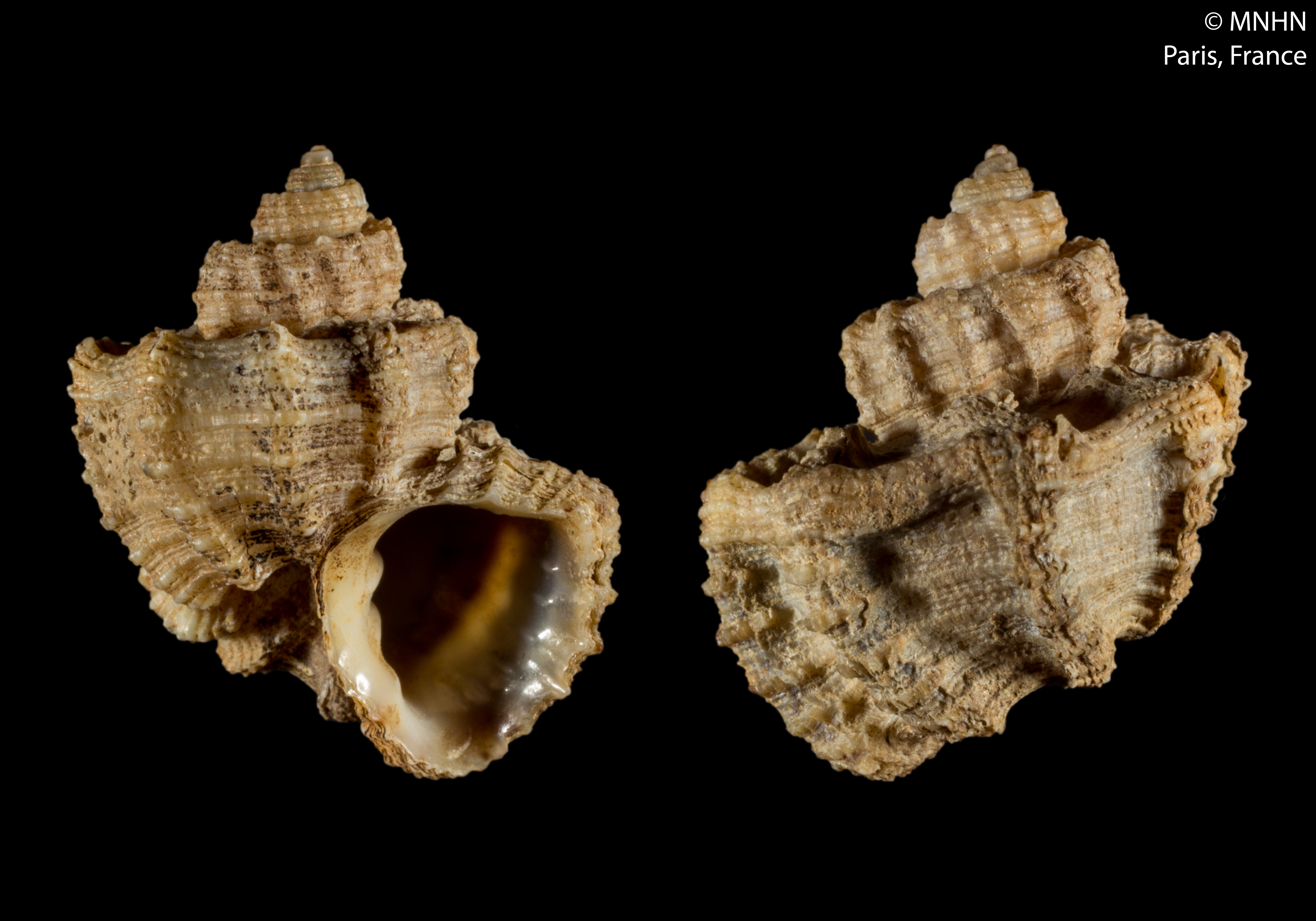
- Shell of Trigonostoma gofasi (holotype at MNHN, Paris)

Scientific classification
- Kingdom: Animalia
- Phylum: Mollusca
- Class: Gastropoda
- Subclass: Caenogastropoda
- Order: Neogastropoda
- Family: Cancellariidae
- Genus: Trigonostoma
- Species: T. gofasi

Binomial name
- Trigonostoma gofasi Verhecken, 2007

Synonyms
- Trigonostoma damasoi T. Cossignani, 2015

= Trigonostoma gofasi =

Species of gastropod

Trigonostoma gofasi is a species of sea snail, a marine gastropod mollusc in the family Cancellariidae, the nutmeg snails.
