= Scalptia androyensis =

Scientific classification
- Kingdom: Animalia
- Phylum: Mollusca
- Class: Gastropoda
- Subclass: Caenogastropoda
- Order: Neogastropoda
- Family: Cancellariidae
- Genus: Scalptia
- Species: S. androyensis

Binomial name
- Scalptia androyensis Verhecken & Bozzetti, 2006

Species of gastropod

Scalptia androyensis is a species of sea snail, a marine gastropod mollusk in the family Cancellariidae, the nutmeg snails.
