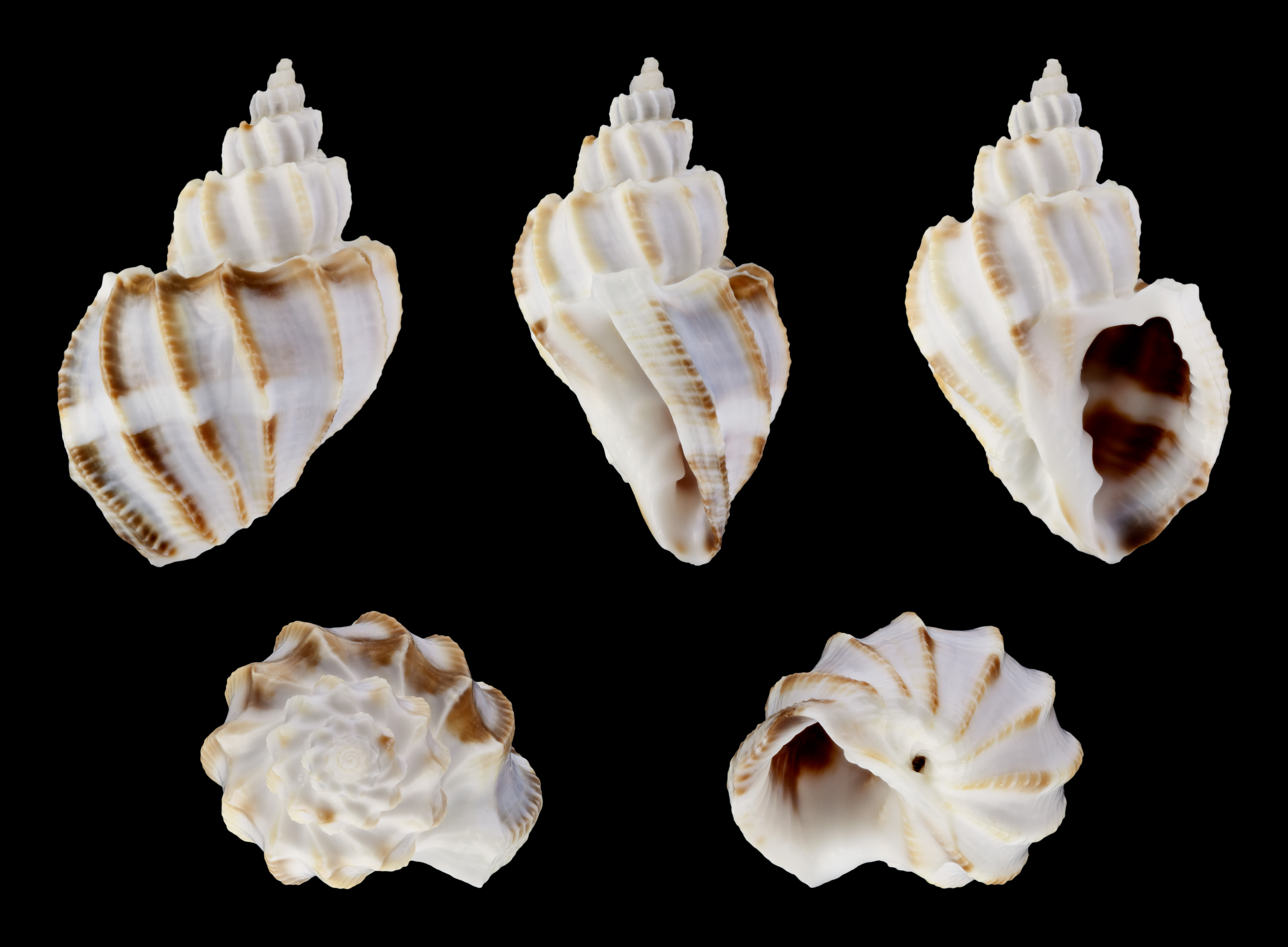

Scientific classification
- Kingdom: Animalia
- Phylum: Mollusca
- Class: Gastropoda
- Subclass: Caenogastropoda
- Order: Neogastropoda
- Family: Cancellariidae
- Genus: Scalptia
- Species: S. crossei

Binomial name
- Scalptia crossei (Semper, 1861)

Synonyms
- Cancellaria crossei Semper, 1861; Cancellaria serrata Reeve, 1856 (non Bronn, 1831)

= Scalptia crossei =

Species of gastropod

Scalptia crossei is a species of sea snail, a marine gastropod mollusk in the family Cancellariidae, the nutmeg snails.
