= Trigonostoma tessella =

Scientific classification
- Kingdom: Animalia
- Phylum: Mollusca
- Class: Gastropoda
- Subclass: Caenogastropoda
- Order: Neogastropoda
- Family: Cancellariidae
- Genus: Trigonostoma
- Species: T. tessella

Binomial name
- Trigonostoma tessella Garrard, 1975

Species of gastropod

Trigonostoma tessella is a species of sea snail, a marine gastropod mollusc in the family Cancellariidae, the nutmeg snails.
