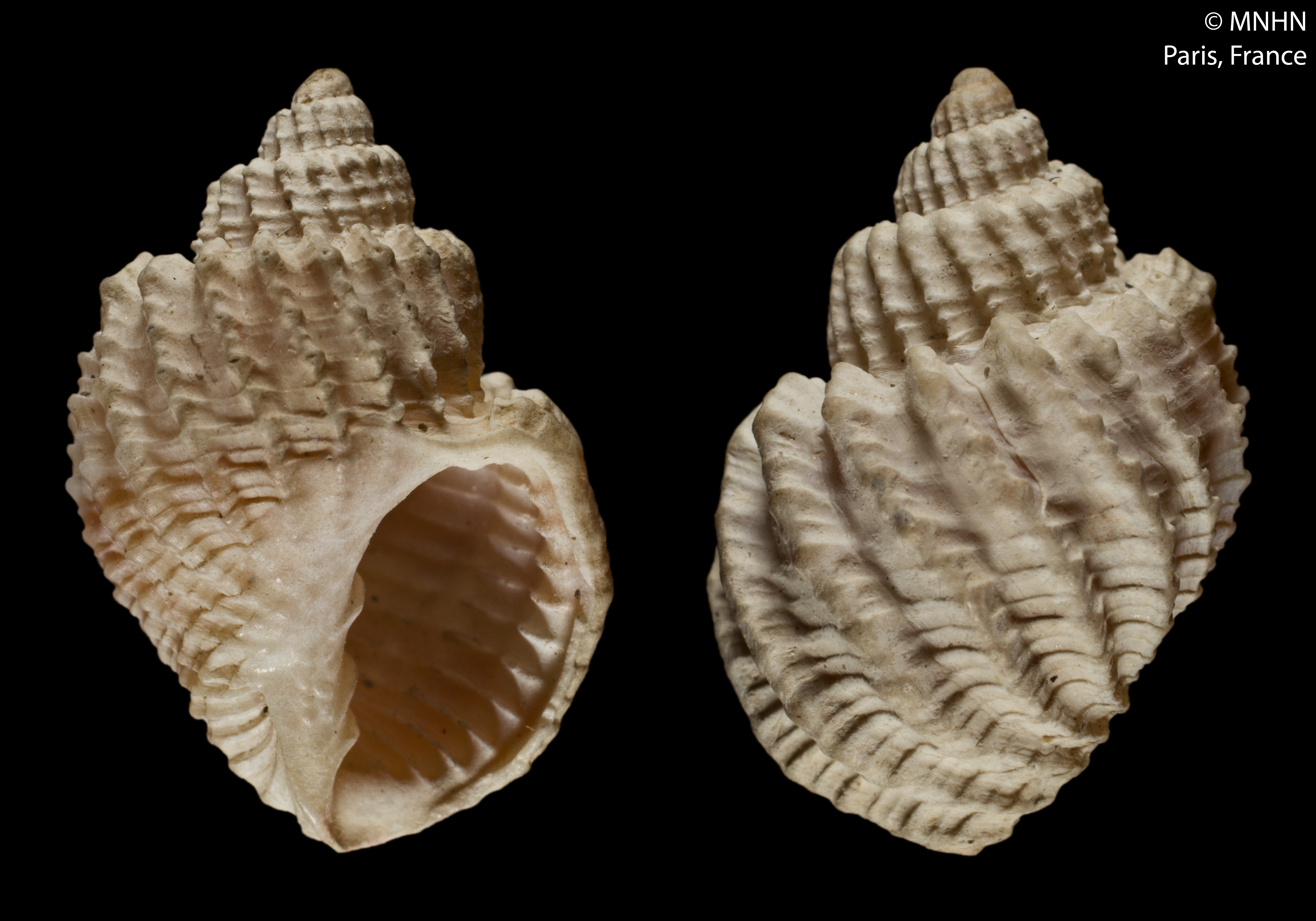
- Shell of Scalptia hystrix (specimen at MNHN, Paris)

Scientific classification
- Kingdom: Animalia
- Phylum: Mollusca
- Class: Gastropoda
- Subclass: Caenogastropoda
- Order: Neogastropoda
- Family: Cancellariidae
- Genus: Scalptia
- Species: S. hystrix

Binomial name
- Scalptia hystrix (Reeve, 1856)

Synonyms
- Cancellaria hystrix Reeve, 1856; Scalptia macconkeyi Jousseaume, 1894

= Scalptia hystrix =

Species of gastropod

Scalptia hystrix is a species of sea snail, a marine gastropod mollusk in the family Cancellariidae, the nutmeg snails.

== Distribution ==
This marine species occurs off the Gulf of Aden.
