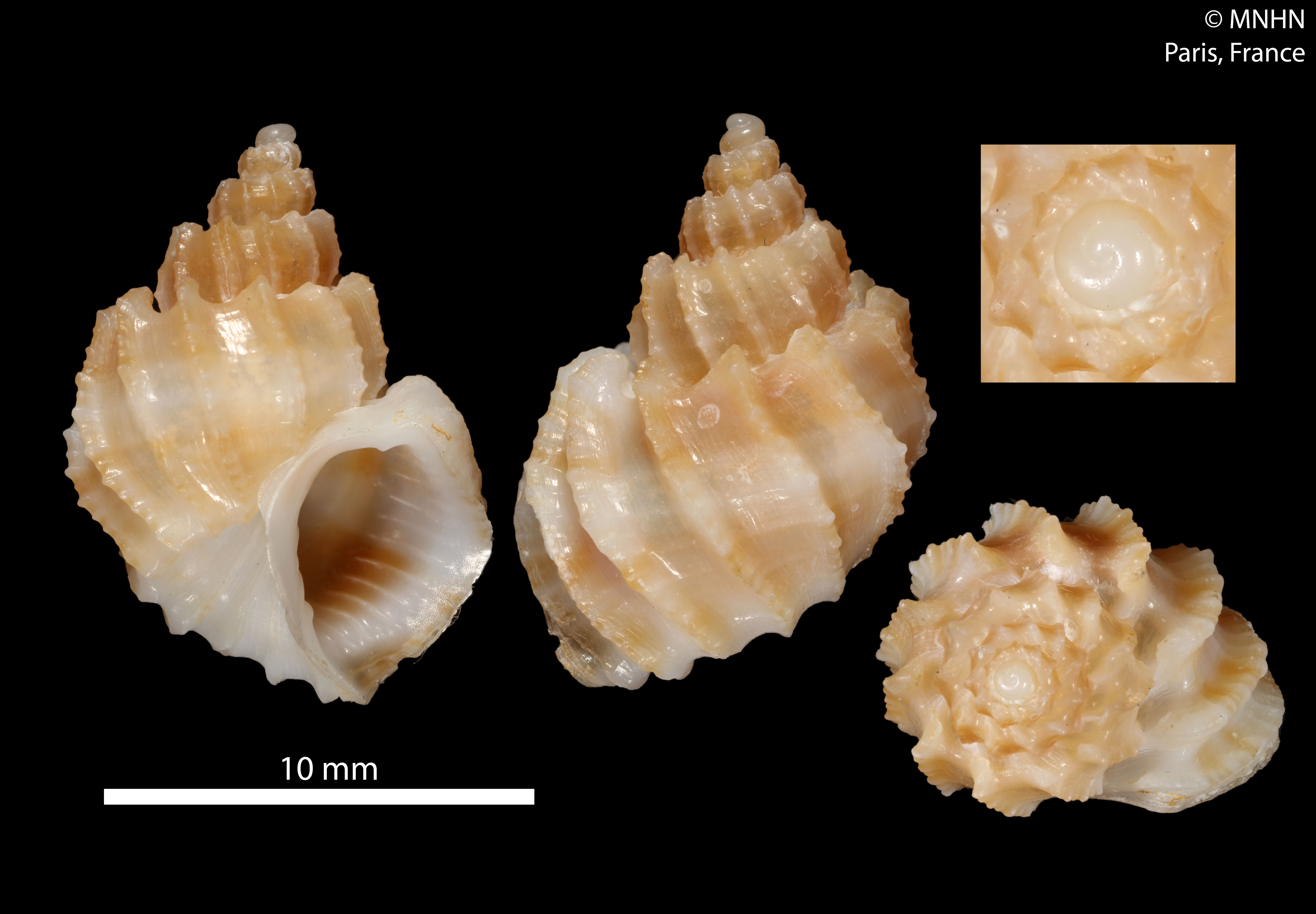
- Shell of Scalptia aliguayensis (paratype at MNHN, Paris)

Scientific classification
- Kingdom: Animalia
- Phylum: Mollusca
- Class: Gastropoda
- Subclass: Caenogastropoda
- Order: Neogastropoda
- Family: Cancellariidae
- Genus: Scalptia
- Species: S. aliguayensis

Binomial name
- Scalptia aliguayensis Verhecken, 2008

= Scalptia aliguayensis =

Species of gastropod

Scalptia aliguayensis is a species of sea snail, a marine gastropod mollusk in the family Cancellariidae, the nutmeg snails.

== Distribution ==
This marine species occurs off the Philippines.
