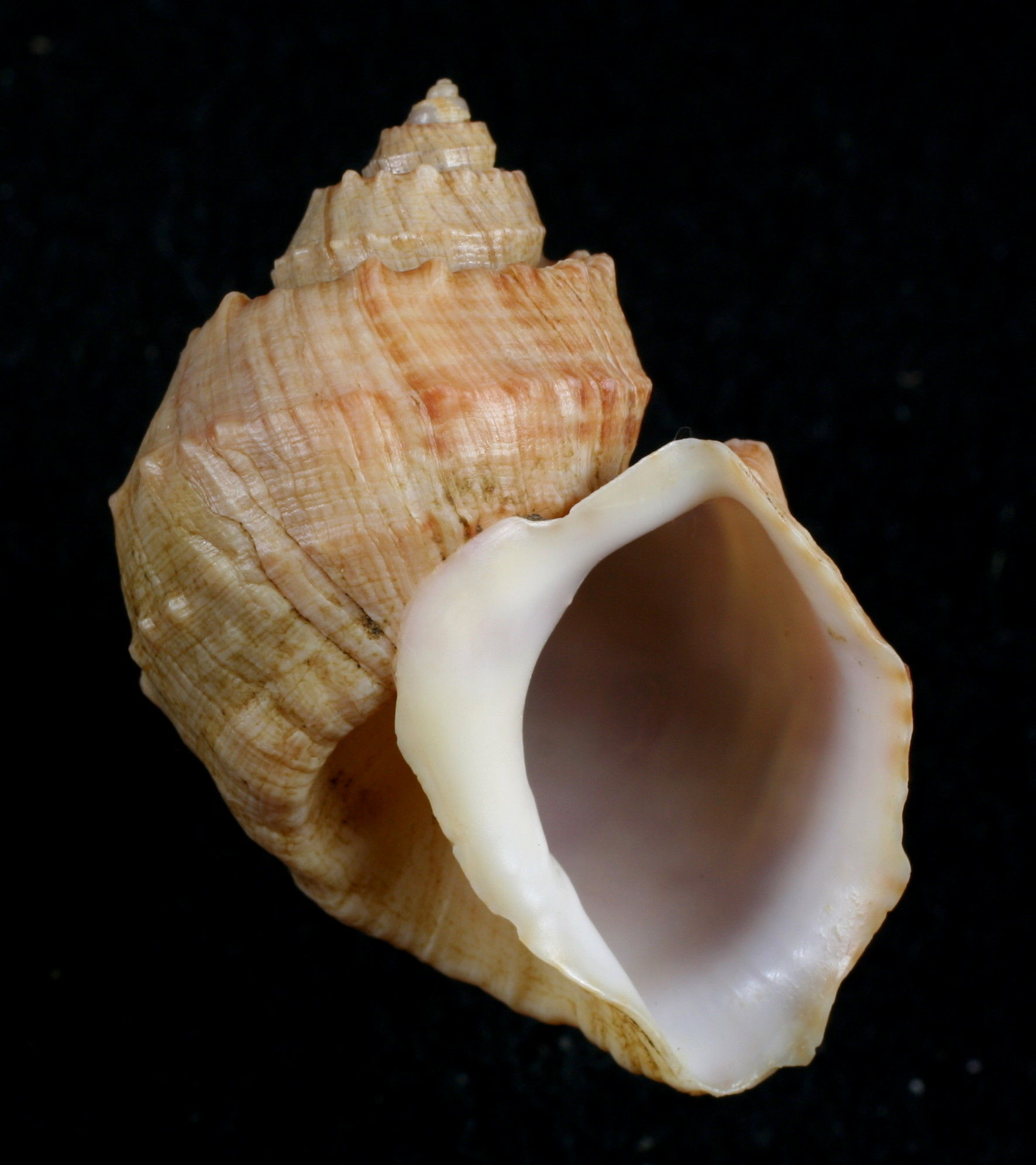
- Apertural view of shell of Trigonostoma bullatum

Scientific classification
- Kingdom: Animalia
- Phylum: Mollusca
- Class: Gastropoda
- Subclass: Caenogastropoda
- Order: Neogastropoda
- Family: Cancellariidae
- Genus: Trigonostoma
- Species: T. bullatum

Binomial name
- Trigonostoma bullatum (Sowerby, 1832)

= Trigonostoma bullatum =

Species of sea snail

Trigonostoma bullatum is a species of sea snail, a marine gastropod mollusc in the family Cancellariidae, the nutmeg snails.

== History ==
The sea snail was first described by George Brettingham Sowerby I in 1832, possibly with the help of his son, naturalist George Brettingham Sowerby II.
