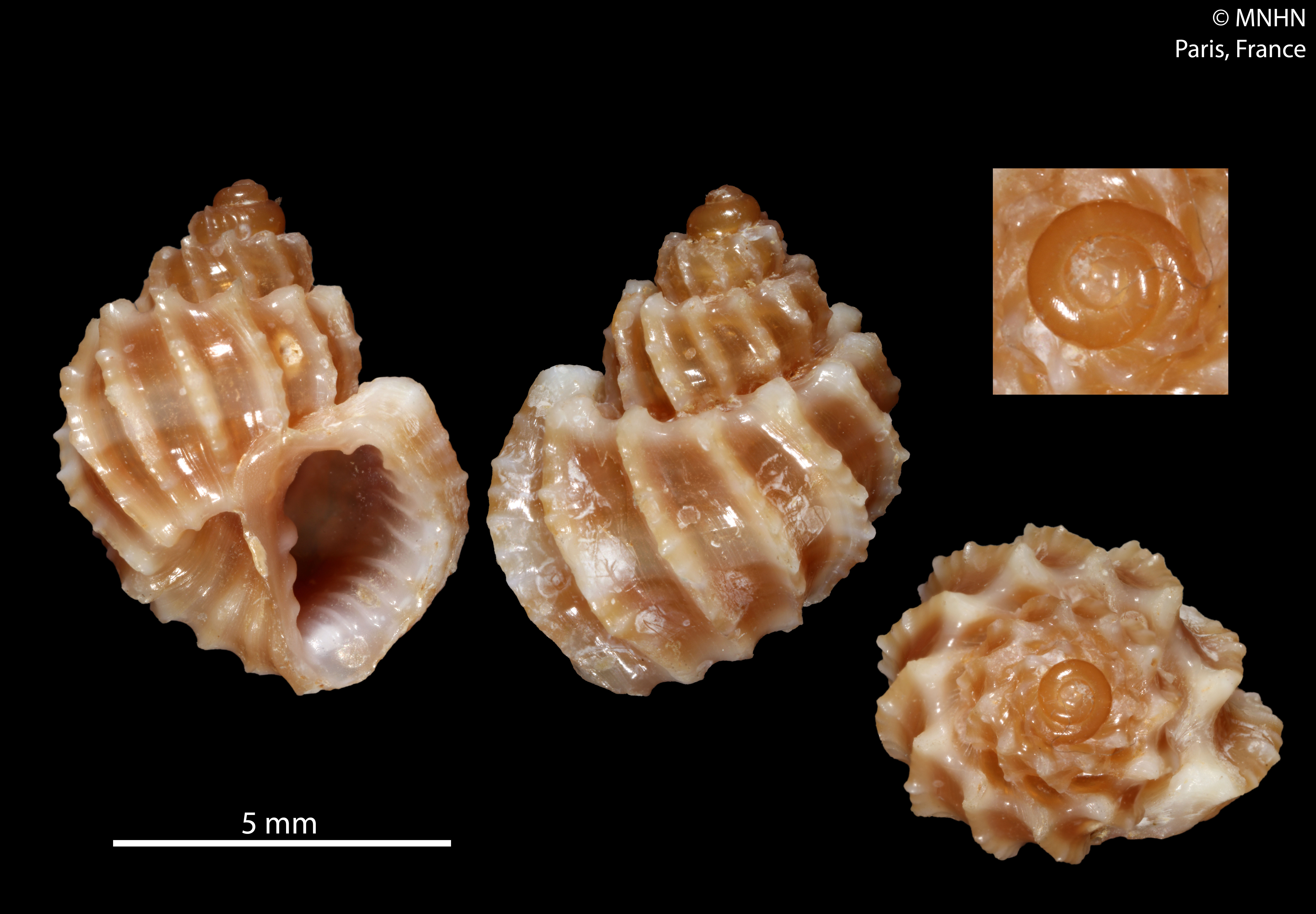
- Shell of Scalptia crispatoides (paratype at MNHN, Paris)

Scientific classification
- Kingdom: Animalia
- Phylum: Mollusca
- Class: Gastropoda
- Subclass: Caenogastropoda
- Order: Neogastropoda
- Family: Cancellariidae
- Genus: Scalptia
- Species: S. crispatoides

Binomial name
- Scalptia crispatoides Verhecken, 2008

= Scalptia crispatoides =

Species of gastropod

Scalptia crispatoides is a species of sea snail, a marine gastropod mollusk in the family Cancellariidae, the nutmeg snails.

== Distribution ==
This marine species occurs off the Philippines.
