= Trigonostoma semidisjunctum =

Scientific classification
- Kingdom: Animalia
- Phylum: Mollusca
- Class: Gastropoda
- Subclass: Caenogastropoda
- Order: Neogastropoda
- Family: Cancellariidae
- Genus: Trigonostoma
- Species: T. semidisjunctum

Binomial name
- Trigonostoma semidisjunctum (G.B. Sowerby II, 1849a)

Synonyms
- Cancellaria semidisjuncta G.B. Sowerby II, 1849a; Trigonostoma semidisjuncta [sic] (incorrect gender ending)

Species of gastropod

Trigonostoma semidisjunctum is a species of sea snail, a marine gastropod mollusc in the family Cancellariidae, the nutmeg snails.
