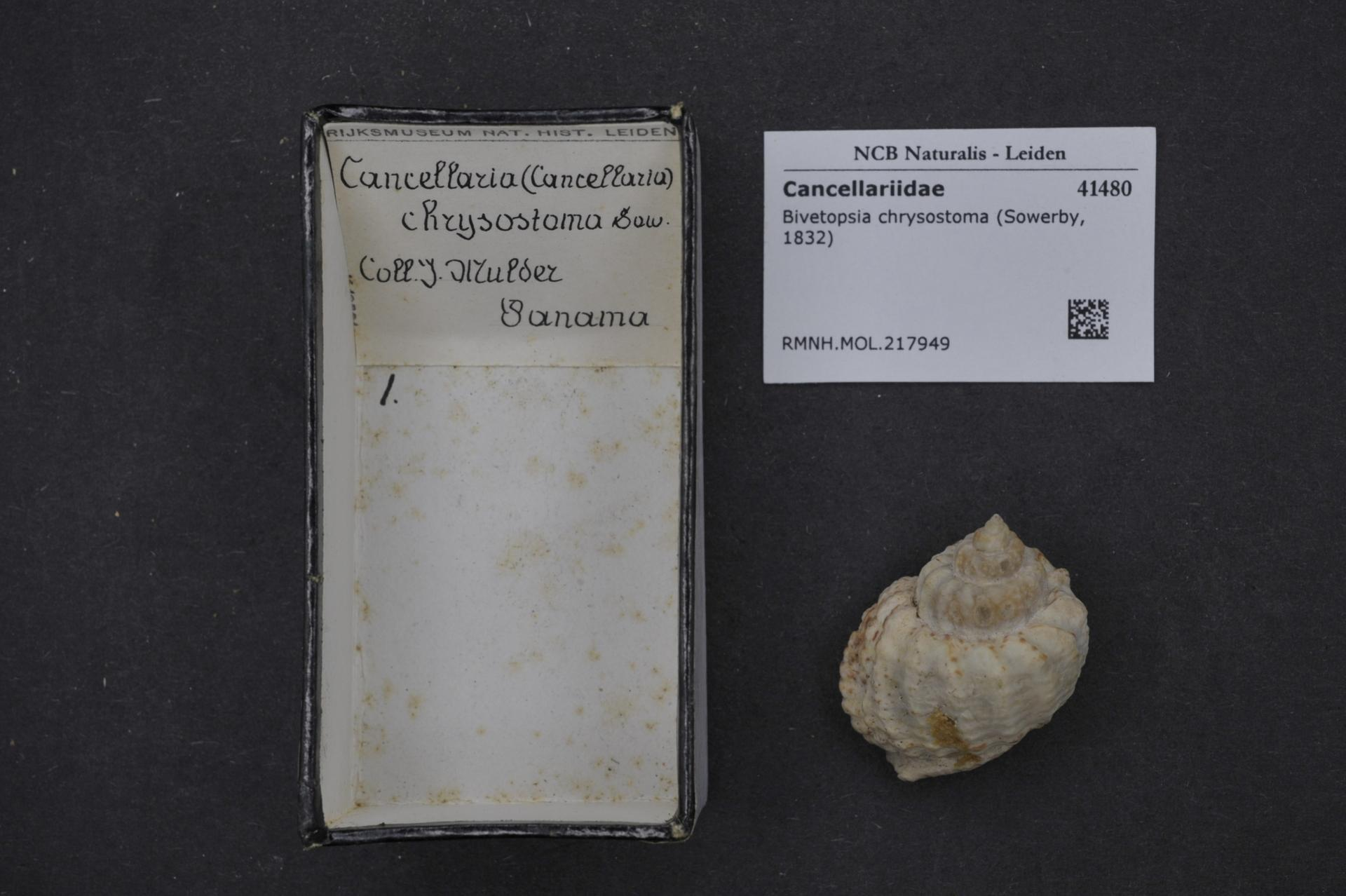
- Preserved sample of Bivetopsia chrysostoma

Scientific classification
- Kingdom: Animalia
- Phylum: Mollusca
- Class: Gastropoda
- Subclass: Caenogastropoda
- Order: Neogastropoda
- Family: Cancellariidae
- Genus: Bivetopsia; Jousseaume, 1887

Type species
- Cancellaria chrysostoma (G.B. Sowerby I, 1832)

Synonyms
- Cancellaria (Bivetopsia) Jousseaume, 1887

= Bivetopsia =

Genus of gastropods

Bivetopsia is a genus of sea snails, marine gastropod mollusks in the family Cancellariidae, the nutmeg snails.

== General characteristics ==
(Original description in French) The shell is solid, ovoid in shape, and features a very narrow umbilicus along with a striated and ribbed surface. The spire consists of seven whorls that are distinctly depressed near the suture.

The aperture is oval. The siphonal canal is structured so that it does not notch the peristome, while the anterior canal is short, wide, and deep. The outer lip is ribbed on the inside and becomes broadly depressed toward its anterior third. Along the columellar margin, there are three prominent folds; the posterior fold is positioned just in front of the ridge formed by the siphonal canal. The columellar callus is very thick, strongly striated, and features sharply defined, slightly raised edges.

== Species ==
Species within the genus Bivetopsia include:

- † Bivetopsia charapota (Olsson, 1942)
- Bivetopsia chrysostoma (G.B. Sowerby I, 1832)
- Bivetopsia haemastoma (G.B. Sowerby I, 1832)
- † Bivetopsia herberti (Landau, Petit & C. M. Silva, 2007)
- † Bivetopsia moorei (Guppy, 1866)
- † Bivetopsia pachia (M. Smith, 1940)
- † Bivetopsia plectilis (P. Jung & Petit, 1990)
- † Bivetopsia pachia (M. Smith, 1940)
- † Bivetopsia porvenirensis Landau, Petit, Etter & C. M. Silva, 2012
- Bivetopsia rugosa (Lamarck, 1822)
