= Trigonostoma pygmaeum =

Scientific classification
- Kingdom: Animalia
- Phylum: Mollusca
- Class: Gastropoda
- Subclass: Caenogastropoda
- Order: Neogastropoda
- Family: Cancellariidae
- Genus: Trigonostoma
- Species: T. pygmaeum

Binomial name
- Trigonostoma pygmaeum (C.B. Adams, 1852)

Synonyms
- Cancellaria pygmaeum C. B. Adams, 1852a

Species of gastropod

Trigonostoma pygmaeum is a species of sea snail, a marine gastropod mollusc in the family Cancellariidae, the nutmeg snails.
