= Scalptia vangoethemi =

Scientific classification
- Kingdom: Animalia
- Phylum: Mollusca
- Class: Gastropoda
- Subclass: Caenogastropoda
- Order: Neogastropoda
- Family: Cancellariidae
- Genus: Scalptia
- Species: S. vangoethemi

Binomial name
- Scalptia vangoethemi Verhecken, 1995

Species of gastropod

Scalptia vangoethemi is a species of sea snail, a marine gastropod mollusk in the family Cancellariidae, the nutmeg snails.
