= Scalptia scalata =

Scientific classification
- Kingdom: Animalia
- Phylum: Mollusca
- Class: Gastropoda
- Subclass: Caenogastropoda
- Order: Neogastropoda
- Family: Cancellariidae
- Genus: Scalptia
- Species: S. scalata

Binomial name
- Scalptia scalata (Sowerby, 1832)

Synonyms
- Cancellaria scalata G.B. Sowerby I, 1832b Cancellaria tenuis A. Adams, 1855

Species of gastropod

Scalptia scalata is a species of sea snail, a marine gastropod mollusk in the family Cancellariidae, the nutmeg snails.
