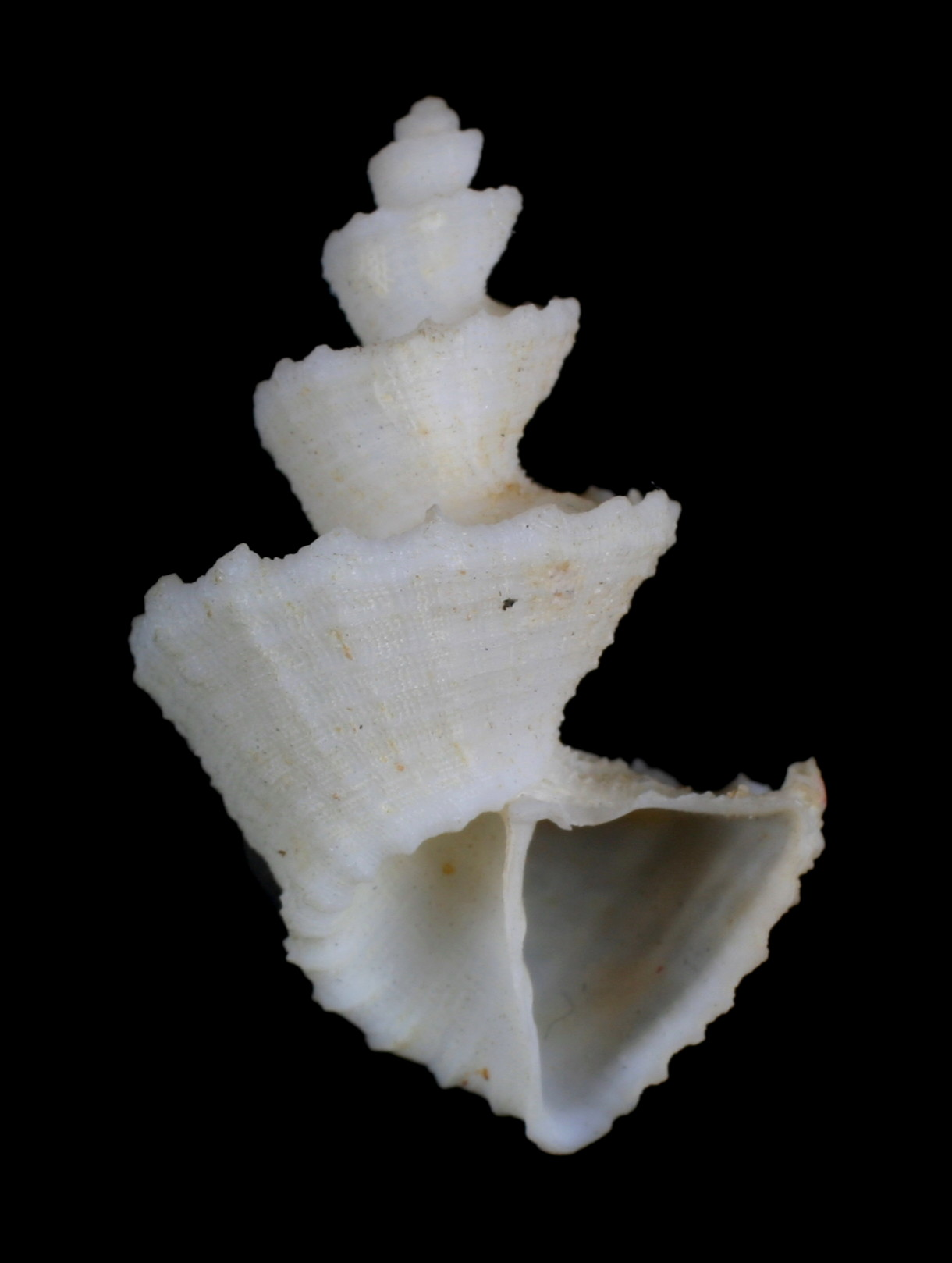
- Apertural view of shell of Trigonostoma scalare

Scientific classification
- Kingdom: Animalia
- Phylum: Mollusca
- Class: Gastropoda
- Subclass: Caenogastropoda
- Order: Neogastropoda
- Family: Cancellariidae
- Genus: Trigonostoma
- Species: T. scalare

Binomial name
- Trigonostoma scalare (Gmelin, 1791)

= Trigonostoma scalare =

Species of gastropod

Trigonostoma scalare is a species of sea snail, a marine gastropod mollusc in the family Cancellariidae, the nutmeg snails.

== Description ==
This species attains a length of around 30 mm, while large specimens can reach 45 mm. It has a consistent spiral staircase-like shaped shell, with colors ranging from white, yellow, orange, and brown. It's not known how exactly it feeds, but it's speculated that it's a suctorial feeder— living off the body fluids and predator eggs of other animals.

== Distribution ==
This species of sea snail is moderately common, and it can be found in the Philippines, Sri Lanka, Australia, and the Indo-West Pacific. Most specimens are obtained by tangle nets in the Philippines, and they inhabit waters of moderate depth, around the depth of -10 to 30m.
