= Scalptia mercadoi =

Scientific classification
- Kingdom: Animalia
- Phylum: Mollusca
- Class: Gastropoda
- Subclass: Caenogastropoda
- Order: Neogastropoda
- Family: Cancellariidae
- Genus: Scalptia
- Species: S. mercadoi

Binomial name
- Scalptia mercadoi Old, 1968

Species of gastropod

Scalptia mercadoi is a species of sea snail, a marine gastropod mollusc in the family Cancellariidae, the nutmeg snails.
