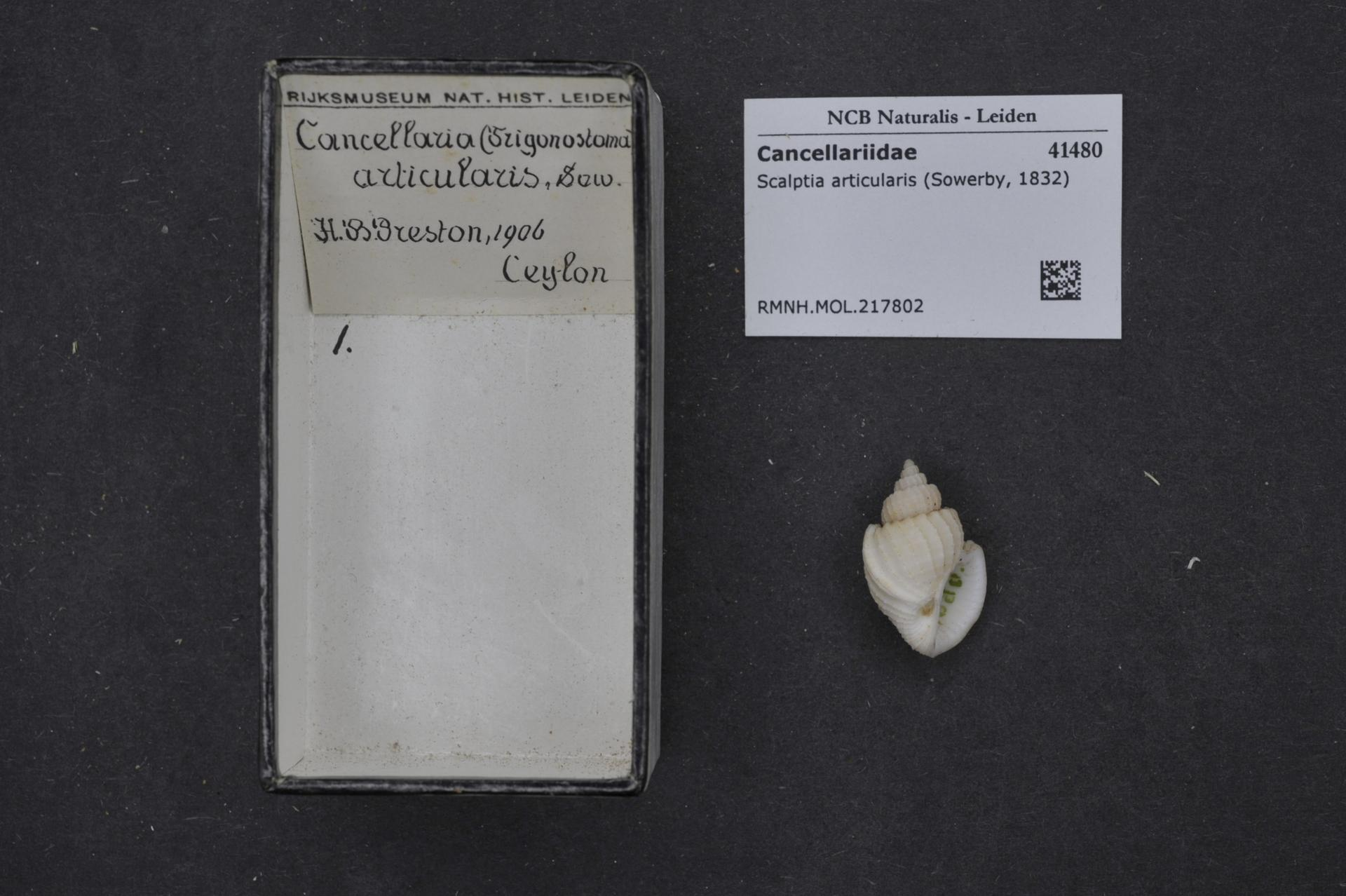

Scientific classification
- Kingdom: Animalia
- Phylum: Mollusca
- Class: Gastropoda
- Subclass: Caenogastropoda
- Order: Neogastropoda
- Family: Cancellariidae
- Genus: Scalptia
- Species: S. articularis

Binomial name
- Scalptia articularis (G.B. Sowerby I, 1832b)

Synonyms
- Cancellaria articularis G.B. Sowerby I, 1832b

= Scalptia articularis =

Species of gastropod

Scalptia articularis is a species of sea snail, a marine gastropod mollusk in the family Cancellariidae, the nutmeg snails.
