= Trigonostoma chui =

Scientific classification
- Kingdom: Animalia
- Phylum: Mollusca
- Class: Gastropoda
- Subclass: Caenogastropoda
- Order: Neogastropoda
- Family: Cancellariidae
- Genus: Trigonostoma
- Species: T. chui

Binomial name
- Trigonostoma chui Yen, 1936

Species of gastropod

Trigonostoma chui is a species of sea snail, a marine gastropod mollusc in the family Cancellariidae, the nutmeg snails.
