= Scalptia verreauxii =

Scientific classification
- Kingdom: Animalia
- Phylum: Mollusca
- Class: Gastropoda
- Subclass: Caenogastropoda
- Order: Neogastropoda
- Family: Cancellariidae
- Genus: Scalptia
- Species: S. verreauxii

Binomial name
- Scalptia verreauxii (Kiener, 1841)

Synonyms
- Cancellaria verreauxii Kiener, 1841

Species of gastropod

Scalptia verreauxii is a species of sea snail, a marine gastropod mollusk in the family Cancellariidae, the nutmeg snails.
