= Trigonostoma mozambicense =

Scientific classification
- Kingdom: Animalia
- Phylum: Mollusca
- Class: Gastropoda
- Subclass: Caenogastropoda
- Order: Neogastropoda
- Family: Cancellariidae
- Genus: Trigonostoma
- Species: T. mozambicense

Binomial name
- Trigonostoma mozambicense Petit & Harasewych, 2002

Species of gastropod

Trigonostoma mozambicense is a species of sea snail, a marine gastropod mollusc in the family Cancellariidae, the nutmeg snails.

== Description ==
The length of the shell attains 20 mm.

== Distribution ==
This species occurs in the Indian Ocean off Mozambique.
