= Scalptia nassa =

Scientific classification
- Kingdom: Animalia
- Phylum: Mollusca
- Class: Gastropoda
- Subclass: Caenogastropoda
- Order: Neogastropoda
- Family: Cancellariidae
- Genus: Scalptia
- Species: S. nassa

Binomial name
- Scalptia nassa (Gmelin, 1791)

Synonyms
- Cancellaria lamellosa Hinds, 1843; Voluta nassa Gmelin, 1791 (basionym)

Species of gastropod

Scalptia nassa is a species of sea snail, a marine gastropod mollusk in the family Cancellariidae, the nutmeg snails.

== Description ==
The dimension of the shell in the fully grown specimens differs significantly; it can be between **12 mm and 22 mm long**. This is the span of variation of shell dimension among the fully grown representatives of this species, where the minimum dimension equals 12 mm, and the maximum equals 22 mm.

== Distribution ==
This species is distributed in the Indian Ocean along East Africa and in the Pacific Ocean along the Philippines.
