= Trigonostoma laseroni =

Scientific classification
- Kingdom: Animalia
- Phylum: Mollusca
- Class: Gastropoda
- Subclass: Caenogastropoda
- Order: Neogastropoda
- Family: Cancellariidae
- Genus: Trigonostoma
- Species: T. laseroni

Binomial name
- Trigonostoma laseroni (Iredale, 1936)

Synonyms
- Arizelostoma laseroni Iredale, 1936

Species of gastropod

Trigonostoma laseroni is a species of sea snail, a marine gastropod mollusc in the family Cancellariidae, the nutmeg snails.
