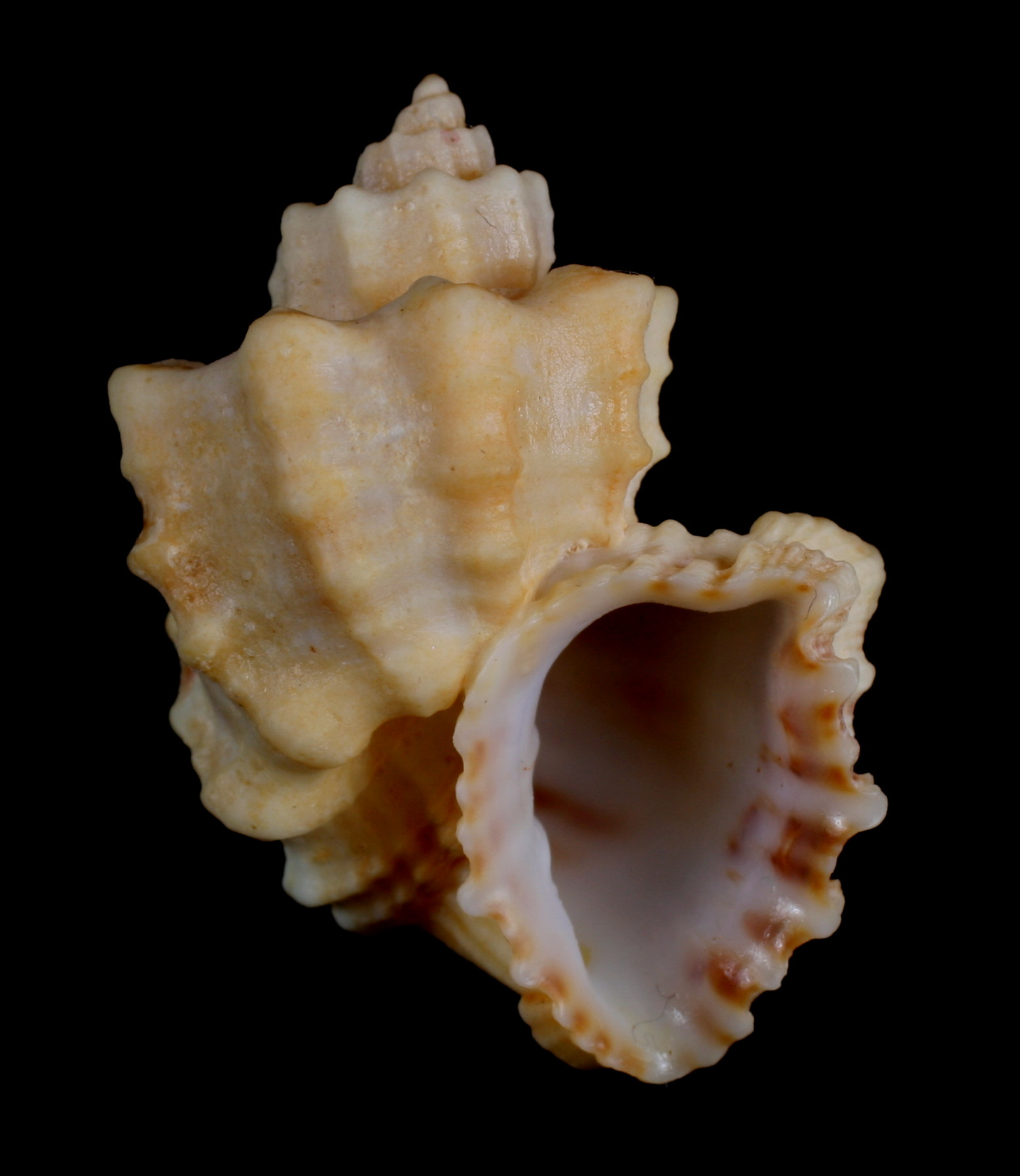
- Apertural view of shell of Trigonostoma goniostoma (Sowerby, 1832)

Scientific classification
- Kingdom: Animalia
- Phylum: Mollusca
- Class: Gastropoda
- Subclass: Caenogastropoda
- Order: Neogastropoda
- Family: Cancellariidae
- Genus: Trigonostoma
- Species: T. goniostoma

Binomial name
- Trigonostoma goniostoma (G.B. Sowerby I, 1832a)

Synonyms
- Cancellaria goniostoma G.B. Sowerby I, 1832a Cancellaria rigida Sowerby, 1832

= Trigonostoma goniostoma =

Species of gastropod

Trigonostoma goniostoma is a species of sea snail, a marine gastropod mollusc in the family Cancellariidae, the nutmeg snails.
