= Scalptia crenifera =

- Shell of Scalptia crenifera

Scientific classification
- Kingdom: Animalia
- Phylum: Mollusca
- Class: Gastropoda
- Subclass: Caenogastropoda
- Order: Neogastropoda
- Family: Cancellariidae
- Genus: Scalptia
- Species: S. crenifera

Binomial name
- Scalptia crenifera (G.B. Sowerby I, 1832b)

Synonyms
- Cancellaria crenifera G.B. Sowerby I, 1832

Species of gastropod

Scalptia crenifera is a species of sea snail, a marine gastropod mollusk in the family Cancellariidae, the nutmeg snails.

== Distribution ==
This marine species occurs off the Philippines.
