= Bivetopsia haemastoma =

Scientific classification
- Kingdom: Animalia
- Phylum: Mollusca
- Class: Gastropoda
- Subclass: Caenogastropoda
- Order: Neogastropoda
- Family: Cancellariidae
- Genus: Bivetopsia
- Species: B. haemastoma

Binomial name
- Bivetopsia haemastoma (G.B. Sowerby I, 1832]

Synonyms
- Cancellaria haemastoma G. B. Sowerby I, 1832 (original combination)

Species of gastropod

Bivetopsia haemastoma is a species of sea snail, a marine gastropod mollusk in the family Cancellariidae, the nutmeg snails.

== Description ==
The length of the shell is 15–20 mm.

== Distribution ==
Endemic to the Galapagos Islands.
