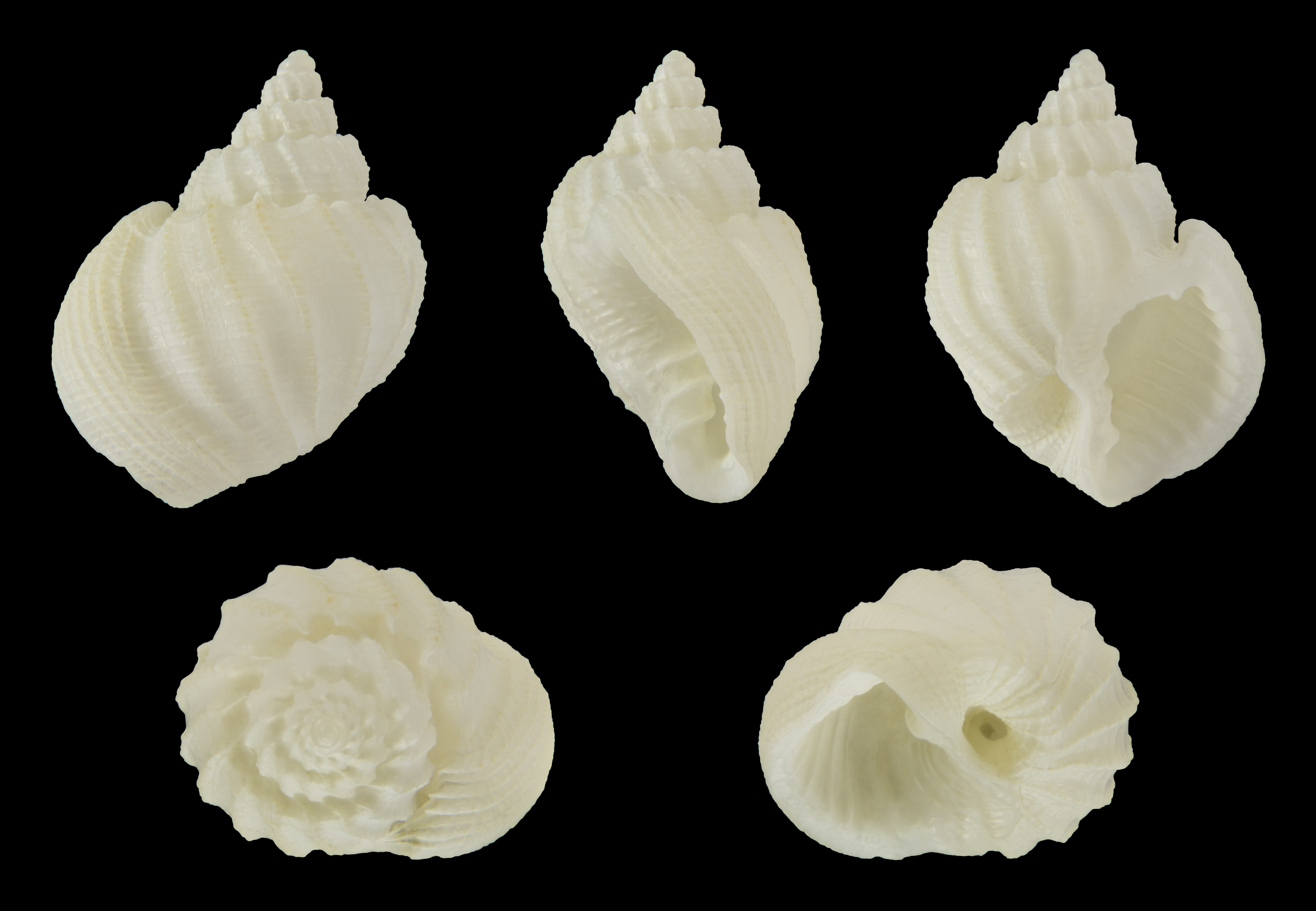

Scientific classification
- Kingdom: Animalia
- Phylum: Mollusca
- Class: Gastropoda
- Subclass: Caenogastropoda
- Order: Neogastropoda
- Family: Cancellariidae
- Genus: Scalptia
- Species: S. obliquata

Binomial name
- Scalptia obliquata (Lamarck, 1822)

Synonyms
- Cancellaria asperula Deshayes, 1830; Cancellaria obliquata Lamarck, 1822b

= Scalptia obliquata =

Species of gastropod

Scalptia obliquata is a species of sea snail, a marine gastropod mollusk in the family Cancellariidae, the nutmeg snails.
