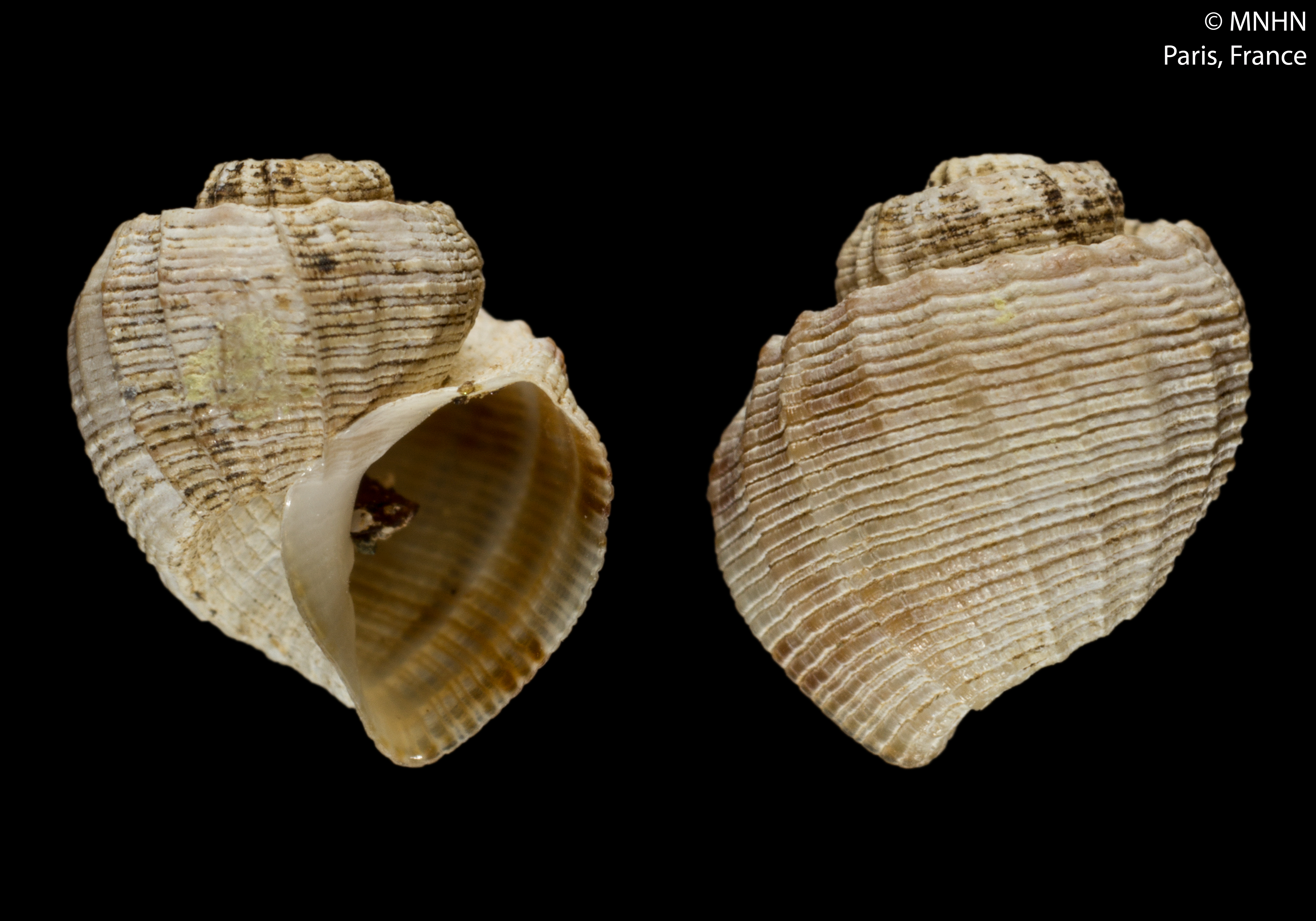
- Shell of Trigonostoma tryblium (holotype at MNHN, Paris)

Scientific classification
- Kingdom: Animalia
- Phylum: Mollusca
- Class: Gastropoda
- Subclass: Caenogastropoda
- Order: Neogastropoda
- Family: Cancellariidae
- Genus: Trigonostoma
- Species: T. tryblium

Binomial name
- Trigonostoma tryblium Bouchet & Petit, 2008

= Trigonostoma tryblium =

Species of gastropod

Trigonostoma tryblium is a species of sea snail, a marine gastropod mollusc in the family Cancellariidae, the nutmeg snails.
