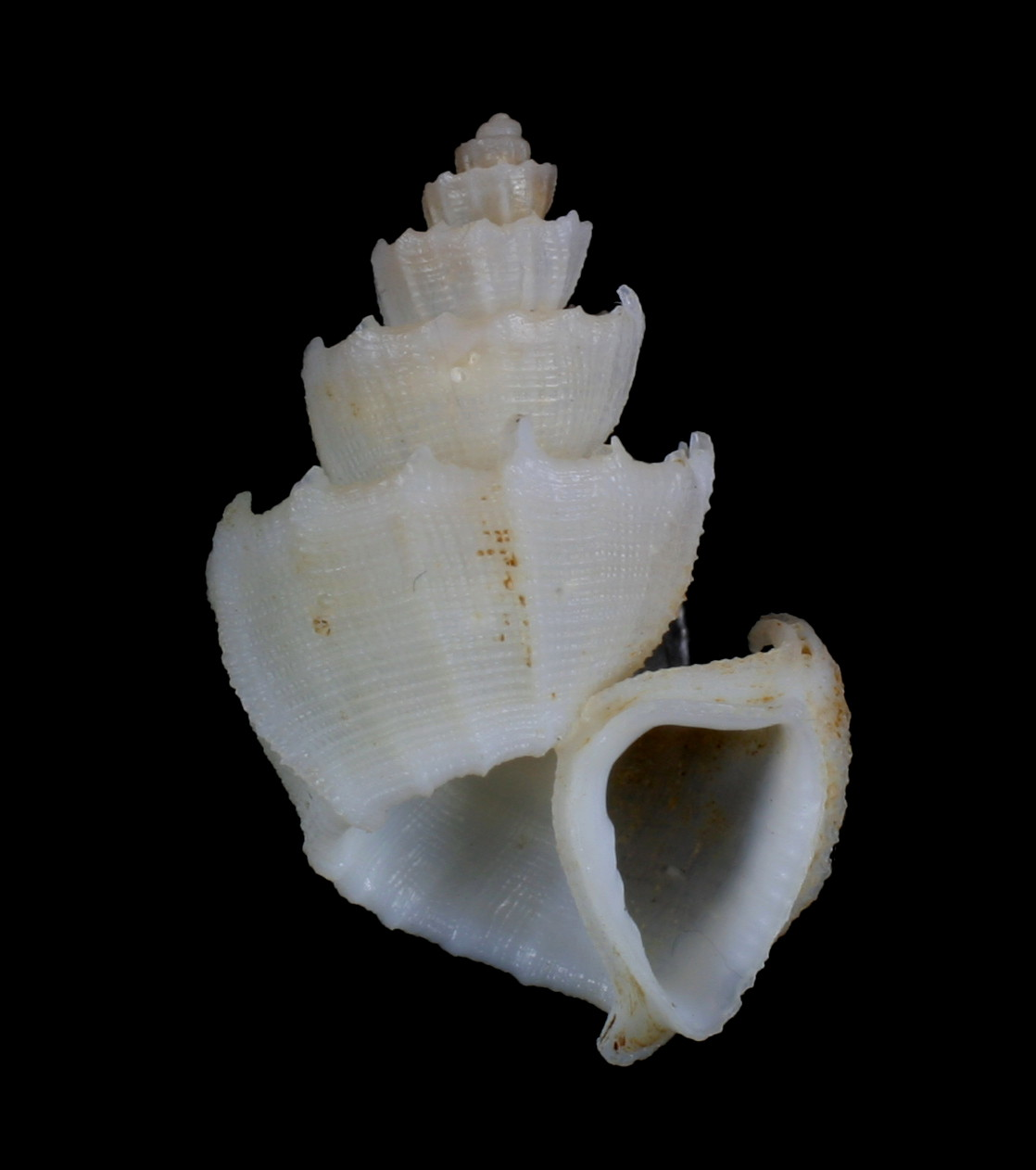
- Apertural view of shell of Trigonostoma thysthlon

Scientific classification
- Kingdom: Animalia
- Phylum: Mollusca
- Class: Gastropoda
- Subclass: Caenogastropoda
- Order: Neogastropoda
- Family: Cancellariidae
- Genus: Trigonostoma
- Species: T. thysthlon

Binomial name
- Trigonostoma thysthlon Petit & Harasewych, 1987

= Trigonostoma thysthlon =

Species of gastropod

Trigonostoma thysthlon is a species of sea snail, a marine gastropod mollusc in the family Cancellariidae, the nutmeg snails.
