= Scalptia crispa =

Scientific classification
- Kingdom: Animalia
- Phylum: Mollusca
- Class: Gastropoda
- Subclass: Caenogastropoda
- Order: Neogastropoda
- Family: Cancellariidae
- Genus: Scalptia
- Species: S. crispa

Binomial name
- Scalptia crispa (G.B. Sowerby I, 1832b)

Synonyms
- Cancellaria crispa G.B. Sowerby I, 1832b

Species of gastropod

Scalptia crispa is a species of sea snail, a marine gastropod mollusk in the family Cancellariidae, the nutmeg snails.
