= Trigonostoma elegantulum =

Scientific classification
- Kingdom: Animalia
- Phylum: Mollusca
- Class: Gastropoda
- Subclass: Caenogastropoda
- Order: Neogastropoda
- Family: Cancellariidae
- Genus: Trigonostoma
- Species: T. elegantulum

Binomial name
- Trigonostoma elegantulum M. Smith, 1947

Species of gastropod

Trigonostoma elegantulum
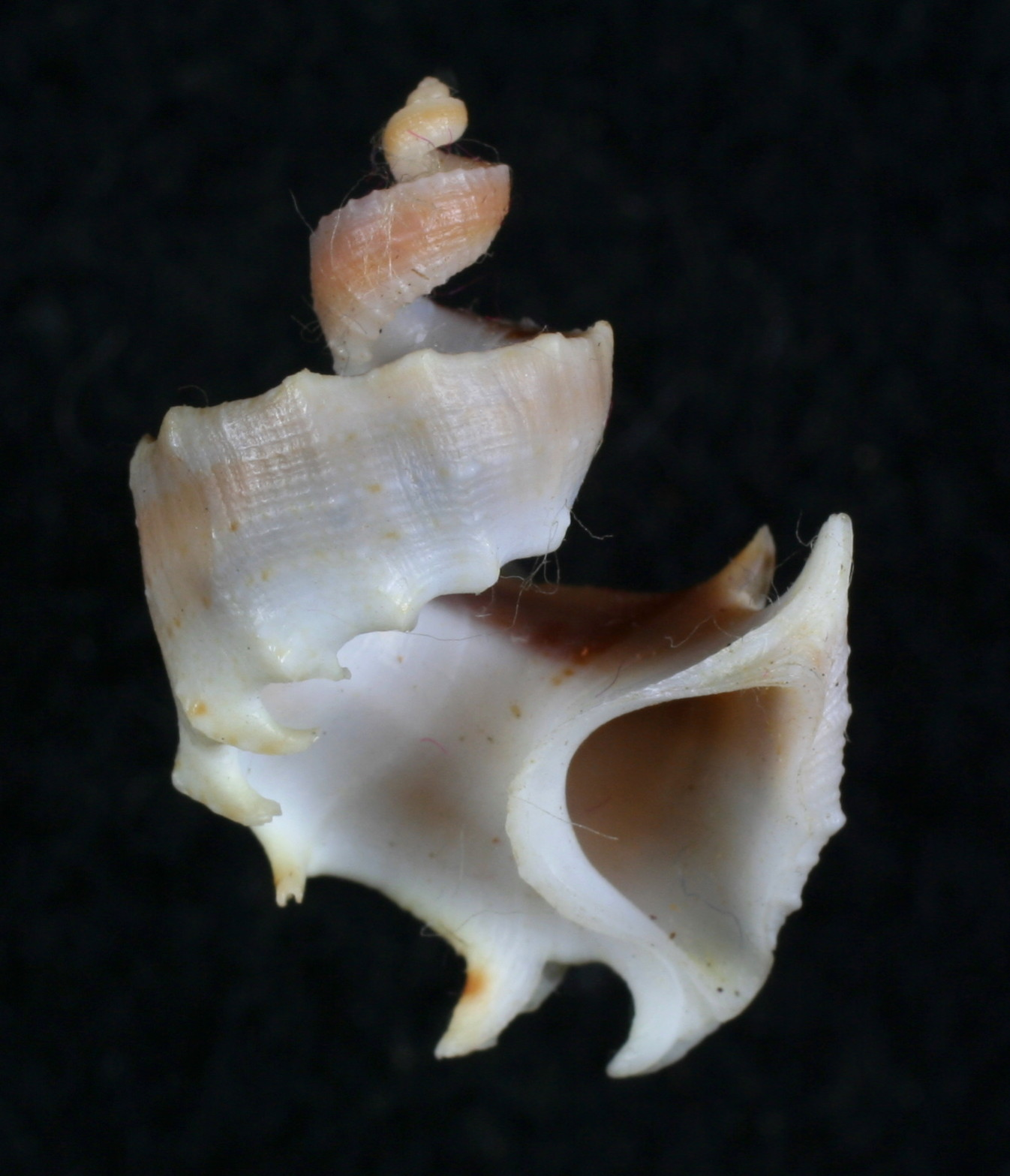

Trigonostoma elegantulum is a species of sea snail, a marine gastropod mollusc in the family Cancellariidae, the nutmeg snails.

== Description ==
This species attains a size of 15 mm.

== Distribution ==
Dredged at 20-30 m. offshore Veraguas Province, West Panama.
