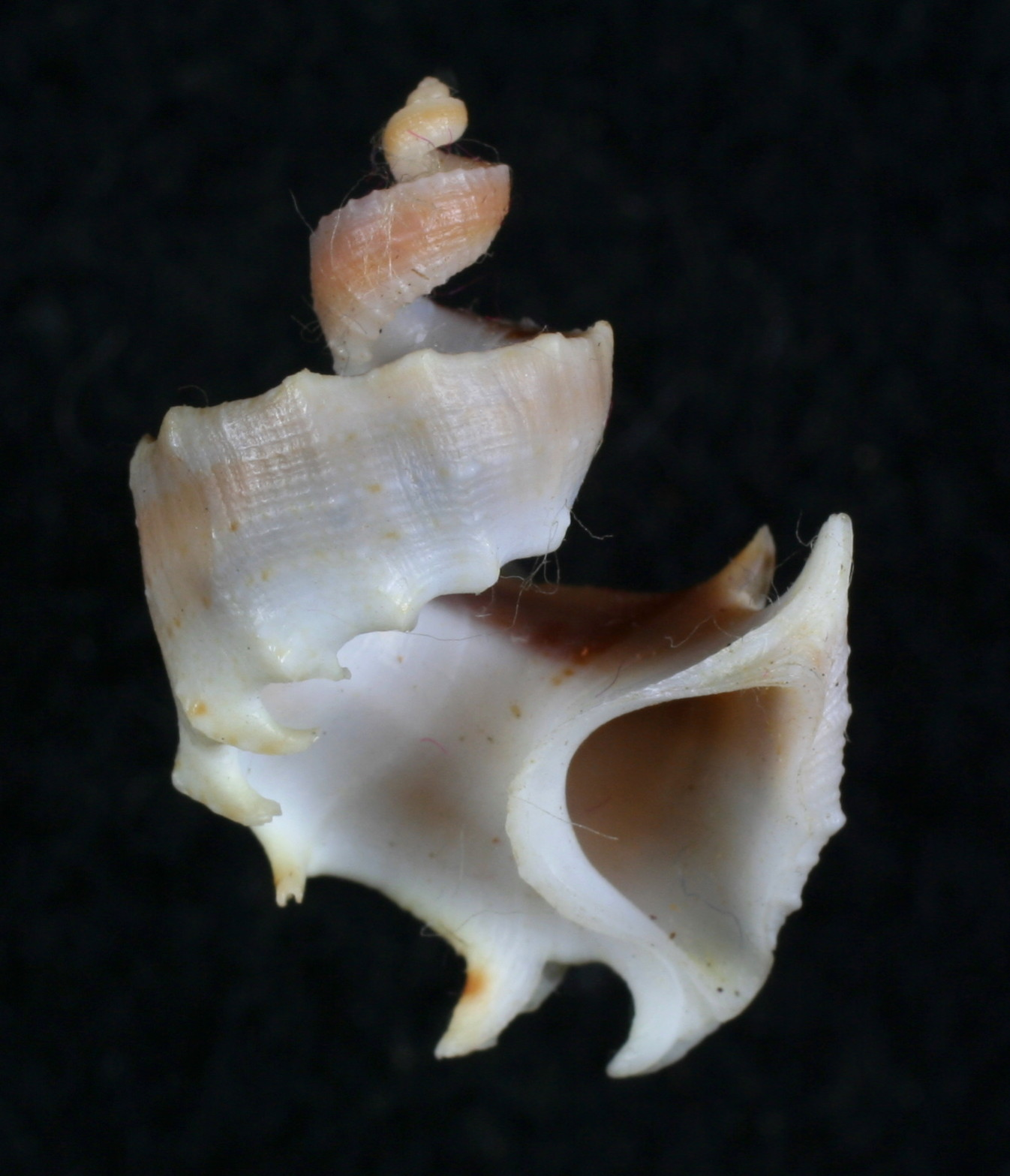
- Apertural view of shell of Trigonostoma milleri

Scientific classification
- Kingdom: Animalia
- Phylum: Mollusca
- Class: Gastropoda
- Subclass: Caenogastropoda
- Order: Neogastropoda
- Family: Cancellariidae
- Genus: Trigonostoma
- Species: T. milleri

Binomial name
- Trigonostoma milleri Burch, 1949

= Trigonostoma milleri =

Species of gastropod

Trigonostoma milleri (common name Miller's Nutmeg) is a species of sea snail, a marine gastropod mollusc in the family Cancellariidae, the nutmeg snails.

== Description ==
Shell size 20 mm.

== Distribution ==
Pacific Ocean: Montijo Bay, Panama.
