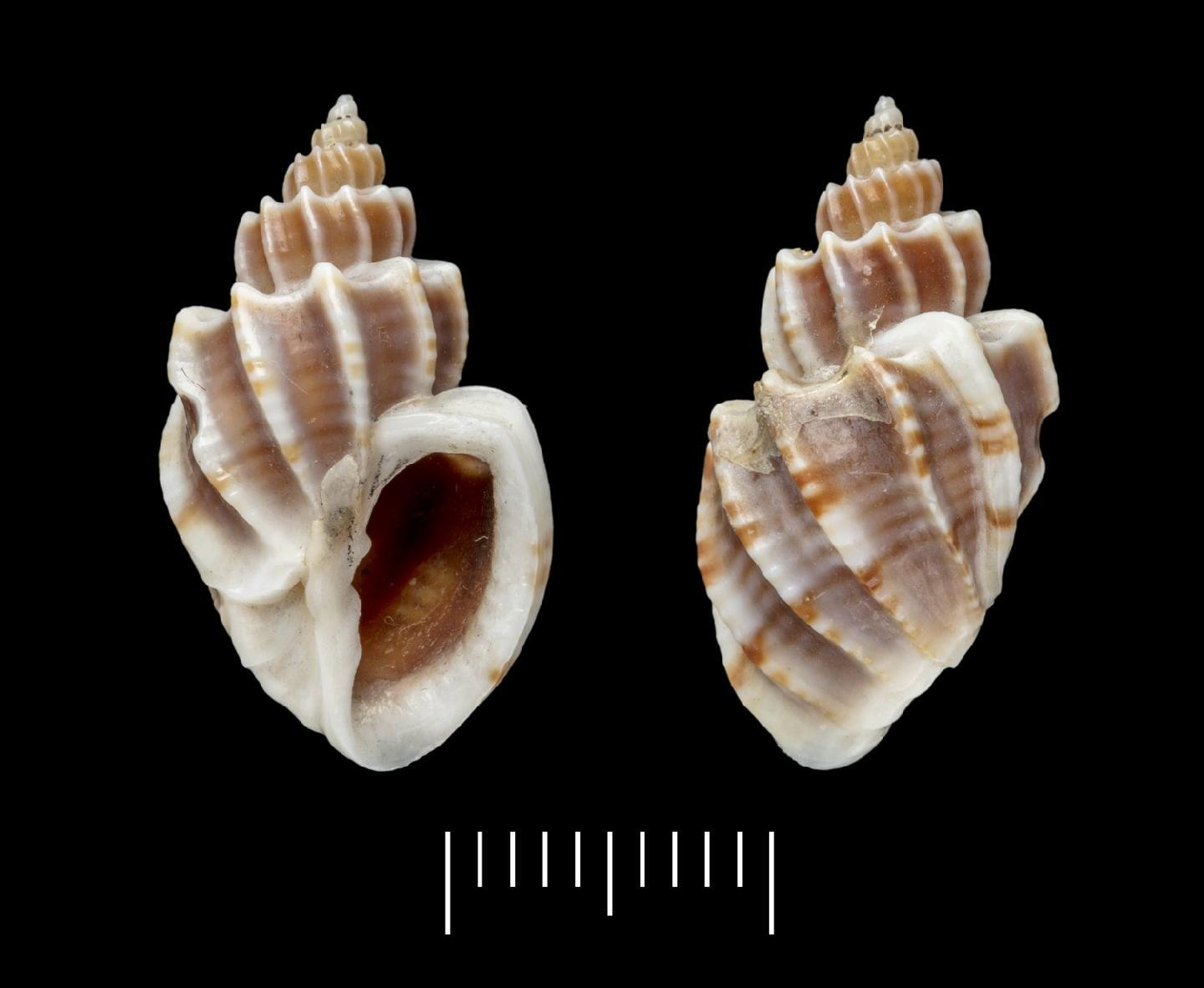

Scientific classification
- Kingdom: Animalia
- Phylum: Mollusca
- Class: Gastropoda
- Subclass: Caenogastropoda
- Order: Neogastropoda
- Superfamily: Volutoidea
- Family: Cancellariidae
- Genus: Scalptia
- Species: S. costifera

Binomial name
- Scalptia costifera (G.B. Sowerby I, 1832)

Synonyms
- Cancellaria constifera G.B. Sowerby I, 1832 (Spelling variation); Cancellaria costifera G. B. Sowerby I, 1832; Trigonostoma costiferum (G. B. Sowerby I, 1832) ·

= Scalptia costifera =

Species of mollusc

Scalptia costifera is a species of sea snail, a marine gastropod mollusc in the family Cancellariidae, the nutmeg snails.

== Distribution ==
This species occurs in the Indian Ocean off Madagascar and Tanzania.
