= Trigonostoma nitidum =

Scientific classification
- Kingdom: Animalia
- Phylum: Mollusca
- Class: Gastropoda
- Subclass: Caenogastropoda
- Order: Neogastropoda
- Family: Cancellariidae
- Genus: Trigonostoma
- Species: T. nitidum

Binomial name
- Trigonostoma nitidum (A. Adams, 1855)

Synonyms
- Cancellaria nitida A. Adams, 1855

Species of gastropod

Trigonostoma nitidum is a species of sea snail, a marine gastropod mollusc in the family Cancellariidae, the nutmeg snails.
