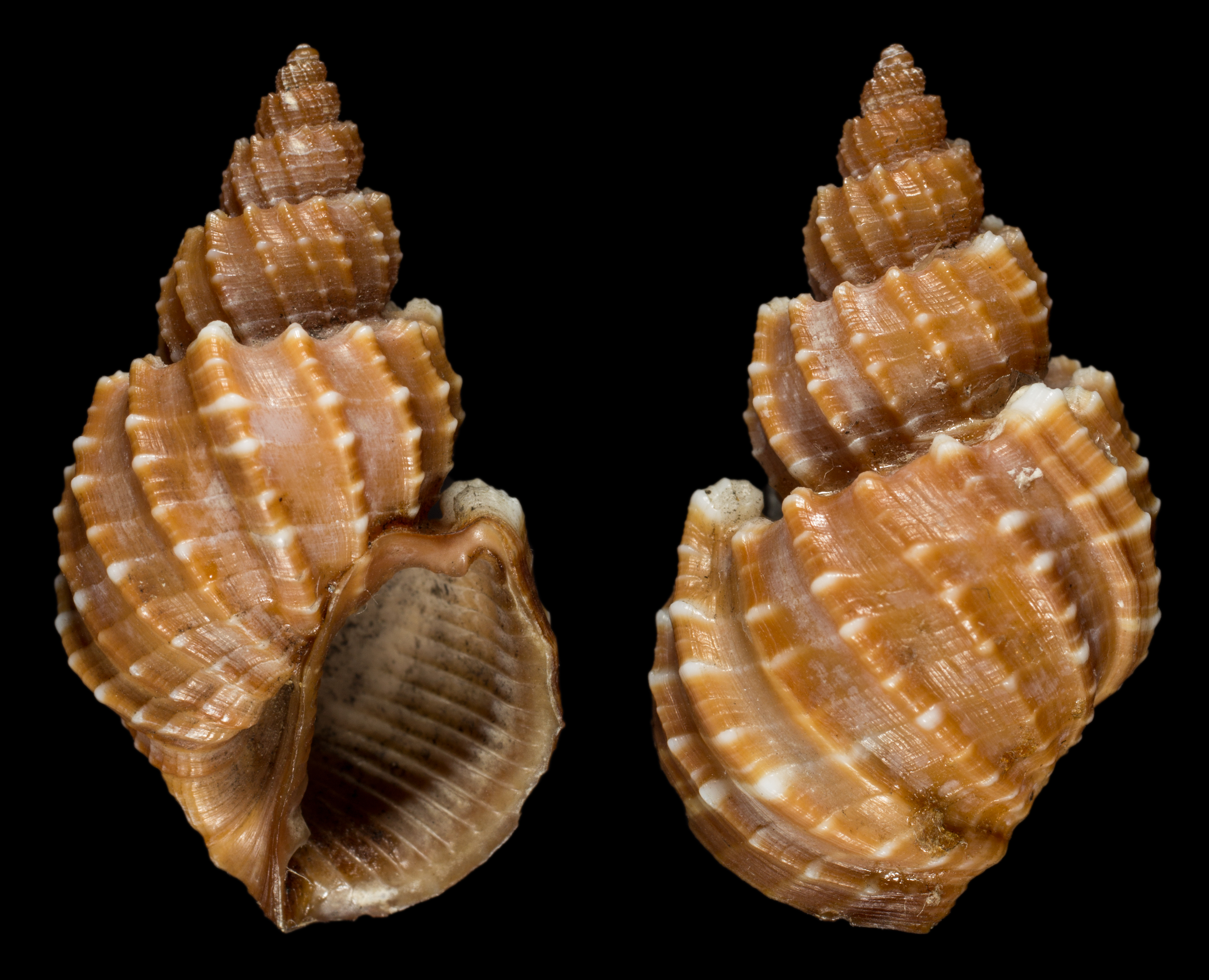
- Shell of Scalptia textilis (syntype at MNHN, Paris)

Scientific classification
- Kingdom: Animalia
- Phylum: Mollusca
- Class: Gastropoda
- Subclass: Caenogastropoda
- Order: Neogastropoda
- Family: Cancellariidae
- Genus: Scalptia
- Species: S. textilis

Binomial name
- Scalptia textilis (Kiener, 1841)

Synonyms
- Cancellaria textilis Kiener, 1841

= Scalptia textilis =

Species of gastropod

Scalptia textilis is a species of sea snail, a marine gastropod mollusk in the family Cancellariidae, the nutmeg snails.

== Distribution ==
This marine species occurs off the Moluccas, Indonesia.
