= Scalptia contabulata =

Scientific classification
- Kingdom: Animalia
- Phylum: Mollusca
- Class: Gastropoda
- Subclass: Caenogastropoda
- Order: Neogastropoda
- Family: Cancellariidae
- Genus: Scalptia
- Species: S. contabulata

Binomial name
- Scalptia contabulata (G.B. Sowerby I, 1832b)

Synonyms
- Cancellaria contabulata G.B. Sowerby I, 1832b; Cancellaria forestieri Montrouzier, 1863; Cancellaria montrouzieri Souverbie, 1863; Cancellaria pusilla Sowerby, 1832; Cancellaria rougeyroni Souverbie in Souverbie & Montrouzier, 1870

Species of gastropod

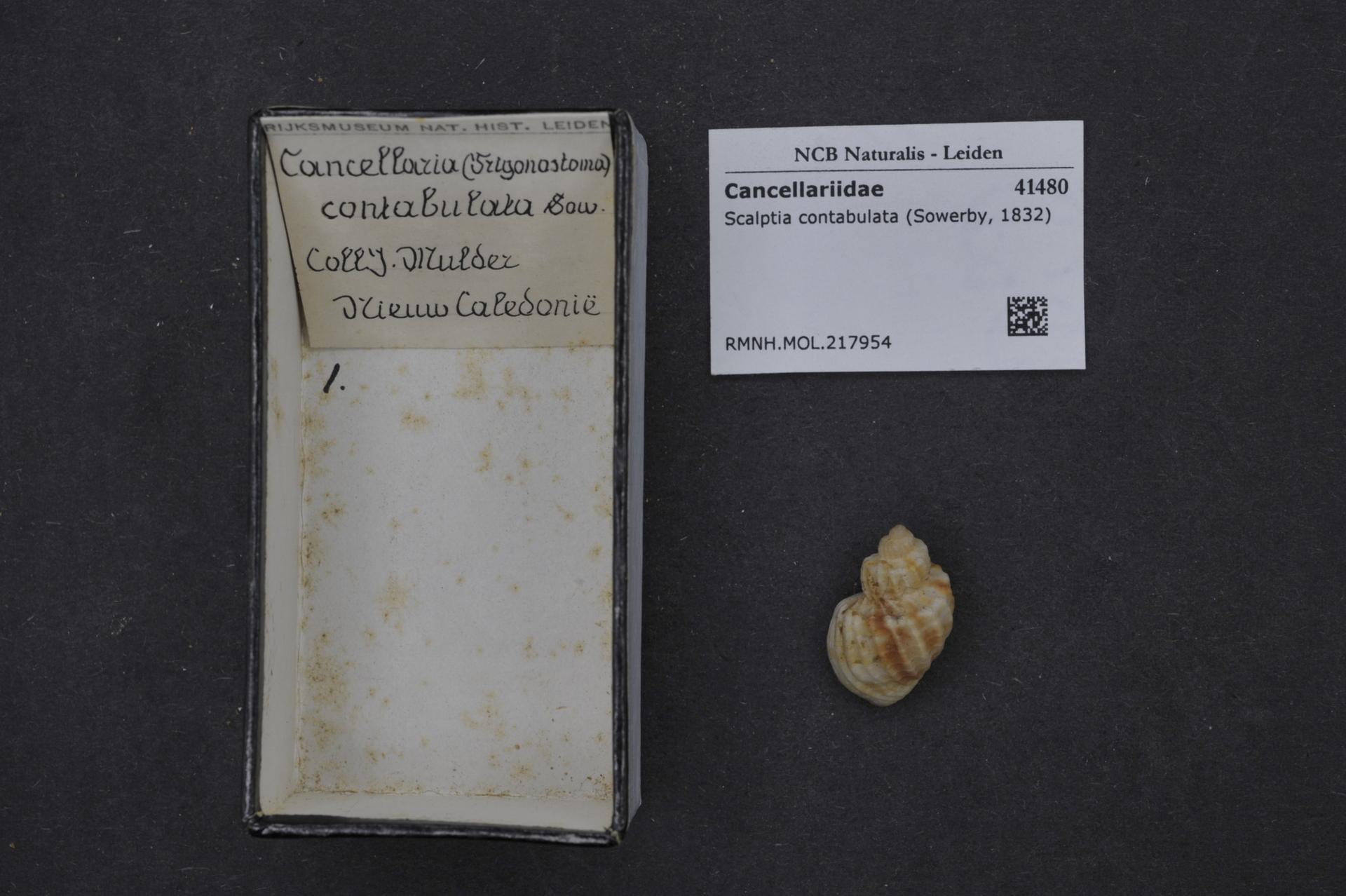
Scalptia contabulata

Scalptia contabulata is a species of sea snail, a marine gastropod mollusk in the family Cancellariidae, the nutmeg snails.

== Description ==
Scalptia contabulata is recognized for its robust and sculpted shell, typically marked with spirally arranged ridges and grooves. The coloration is often pale with darker bands or spots.

== Distribution ==
This species is found in the Indo-Pacific region, including the Solomon Islands, New Caledonia, and parts of the Indian Ocean. It typically inhabits sandy or muddy substrates near coral reefs at depths ranging from the intertidal zone to approximately 10–150 meters.

== Ecology ==
Scalptia contabulata is carnivorous or scavenging, preying on small invertebrates or organic detritus.

== Taxonomy ==
This species has undergone several taxonomic revisions, with synonyms such as Cancellaria pusilla and Cancellaria forestieri. Modern classifications stabilize its placement in the genus Scalptia.
