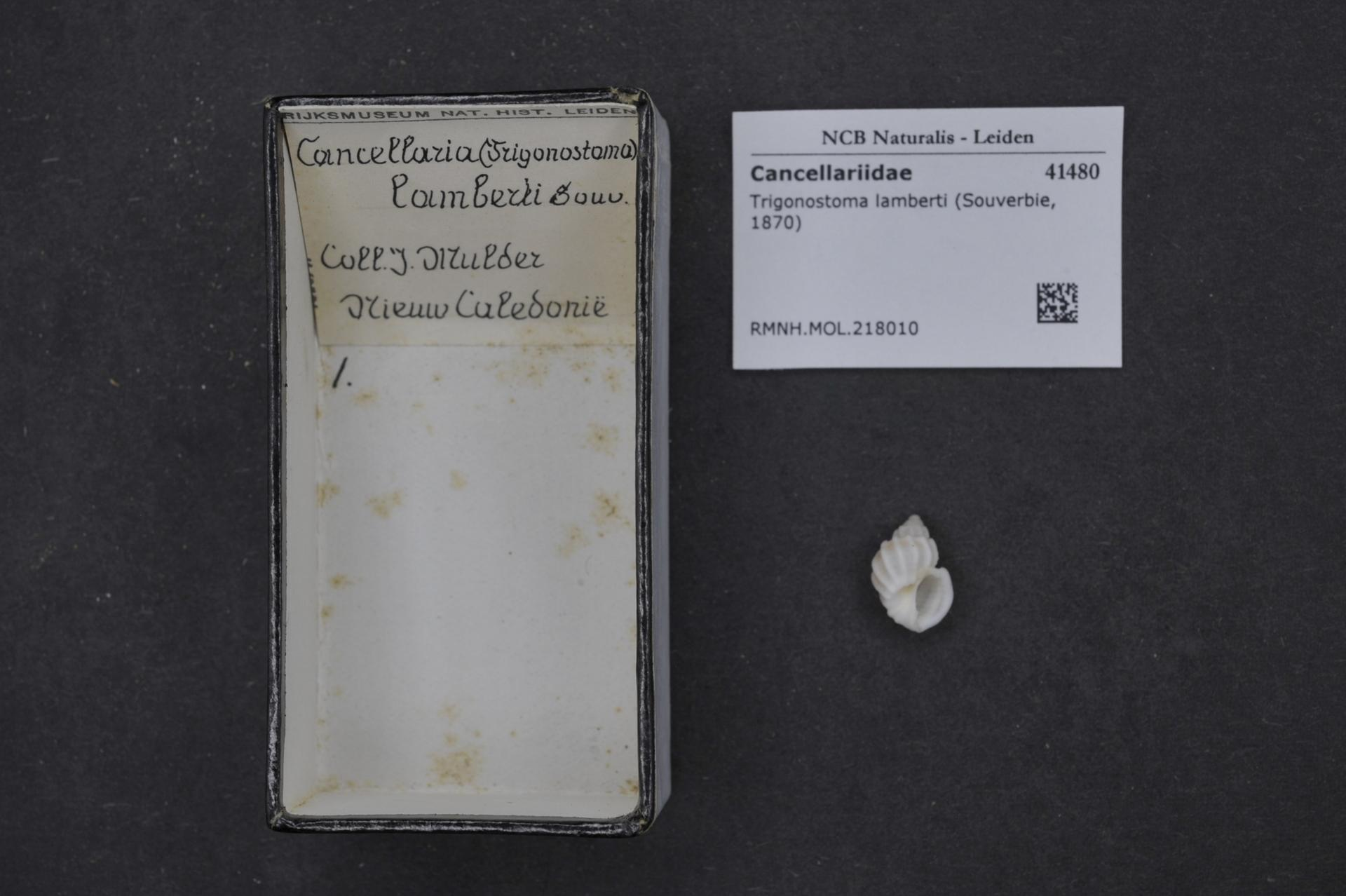

Scientific classification
- Kingdom: Animalia
- Phylum: Mollusca
- Class: Gastropoda
- Subclass: Caenogastropoda
- Order: Neogastropoda
- Family: Cancellariidae
- Genus: Trigonostoma
- Species: T. lamberti

Binomial name
- Trigonostoma lamberti (Souverbie, 1870 in Souverbie & Montrouzier)

Synonyms
- Cancellaria lamberti Souverbie, 1870

= Trigonostoma lamberti =

Species of gastropod

Trigonostoma lamberti is a species of sea snail, a marine gastropod mollusc in the family Cancellariidae, the nutmeg snails.
