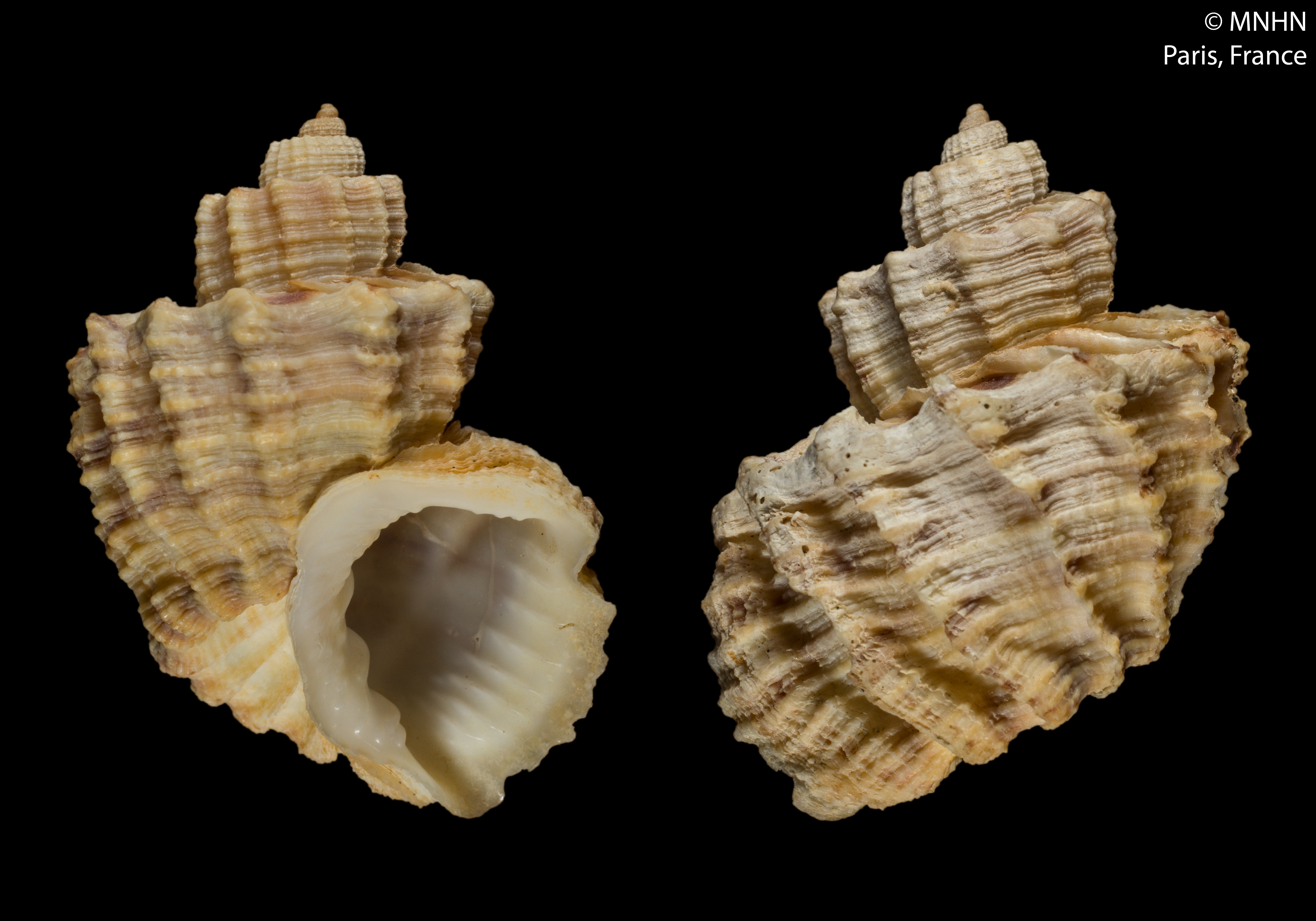
- Shell of Trigonostoma scala (neotype at MNHN, Paris)

Scientific classification
- Kingdom: Animalia
- Phylum: Mollusca
- Class: Gastropoda
- Subclass: Caenogastropoda
- Order: Neogastropoda
- Family: Cancellariidae
- Genus: Trigonostoma
- Species: T. scala

Binomial name
- Trigonostoma scala (Gmelin, 1791)

Synonyms
- Cancellaria costata Sowerby, 1832 (non Sowerby, 1822); Cancellaria rigida G.B. Sowerby I, 1832; Murex scala Gmelin, 1791; Scalptia scala (Gmelin, 1791); Trigonaphera withrowi Petit, 1976

= Trigonostoma scala =

Species of gastropod

Trigonostoma scala is a species of sea snail, a marine gastropod mollusc in the family Cancellariidae, the nutmeg snails.

== Description ==
The length of the shell attains 32.5 mm.

== Distribution ==
This marine species occurs off Senegal.
