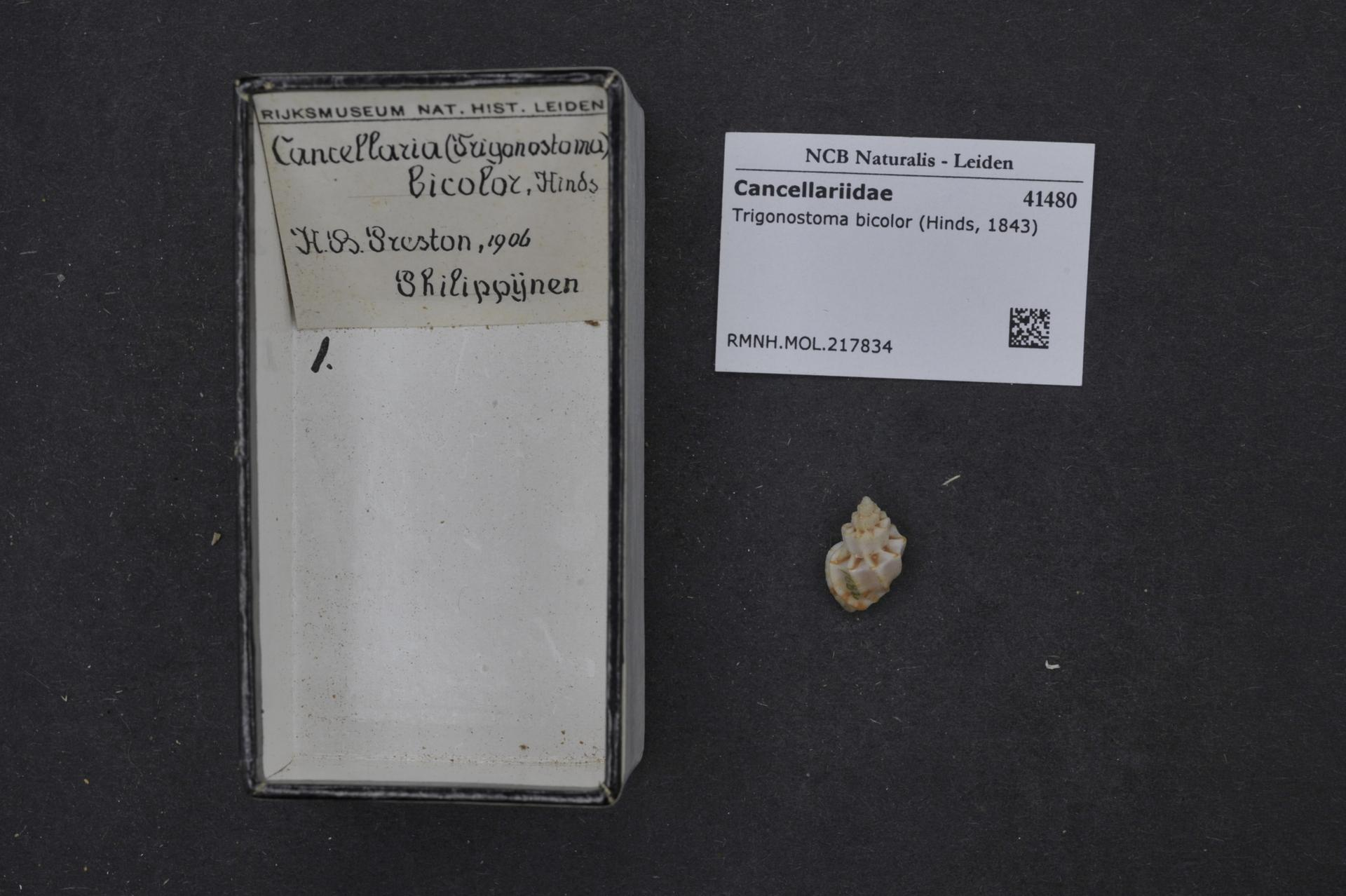
- Preserved specimen

Scientific classification
- Kingdom: Animalia
- Phylum: Mollusca
- Class: Gastropoda
- Subclass: Caenogastropoda
- Order: Neogastropoda
- Family: Cancellariidae
- Genus: Scalptia
- Species: S. bicolor

Binomial name
- Scalptia bicolor (Hinds, 1843)

Synonyms
- Cancellaria bicolor Hinds, 1843; Cancellaria septemcostata Odhner, 1917; Trigonaphera interlaevis Laseron, 1955; Trigonostoma bicolor (Hinds, 1843)

= Scalptia bicolor =

Species of gastropod

Scalptia bicolor is a species of sea snail, a marine gastropod mollusc in the family Cancellariidae, the nutmeg snails.

== Distribution ==
This marine species occur soff the Philippines.
