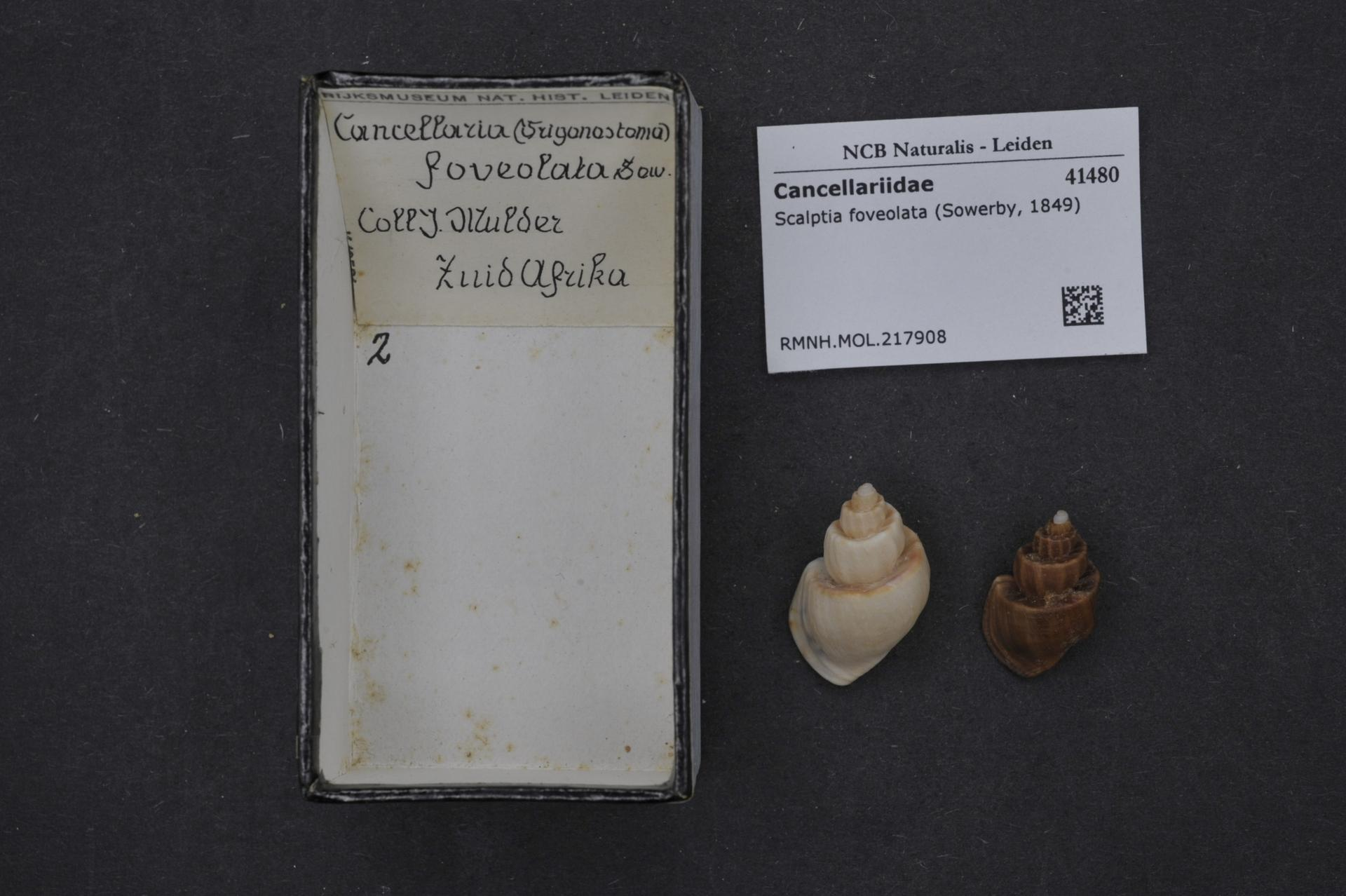

Scientific classification
- Kingdom: Animalia
- Phylum: Mollusca
- Class: Gastropoda
- Subclass: Caenogastropoda
- Order: Neogastropoda
- Family: Cancellariidae
- Genus: Scalptia
- Species: S. foveolata

Binomial name
- Scalptia foveolata (G.B. Sowerby II, 1849a)

Synonyms
- Cancellaria foveolata G.B. Sowerby II, 1849a

= Scalptia foveolata =

Species of gastropod

Scalptia foveolata is a species of sea snail, a marine gastropod mollusk in the family Cancellariidae, the nutmeg snails.
