= Scalptia scalariformis =

Scientific classification
- Kingdom: Animalia
- Phylum: Mollusca
- Class: Gastropoda
- Subclass: Caenogastropoda
- Order: Neogastropoda
- Family: Cancellariidae
- Genus: Scalptia
- Species: S. scalariformis

Binomial name
- Scalptia scalariformis (Lamarck, 1822b)

Synonyms
- Cancellaria constifera G. B. Sowerby I, 1832 (incorrect subsequent spelling); Cancellaria costifera G. B. Sowerby I, 1832; Cancellaria mangelioides Reeve, 1856; Cancellaria scalariformis Lamarck, 1822 (original combination); Trigonostoma costiferum (G. B. Sowerby I, 1832)

Species of gastropod

Scalptia scalariformis is a species of sea snail, a marine gastropod mollusk in the family Cancellariidae, the nutmeg snails.

== Description ==
S. scalariformis can be distinguished from S. harmulensis, a closely related species, by possessing a multispiral protoconch and fewer axial ribs.

== Distribution ==
This species occurs in the Red Sea, and in the Indian Ocean off Tanzania and Madagascar.
