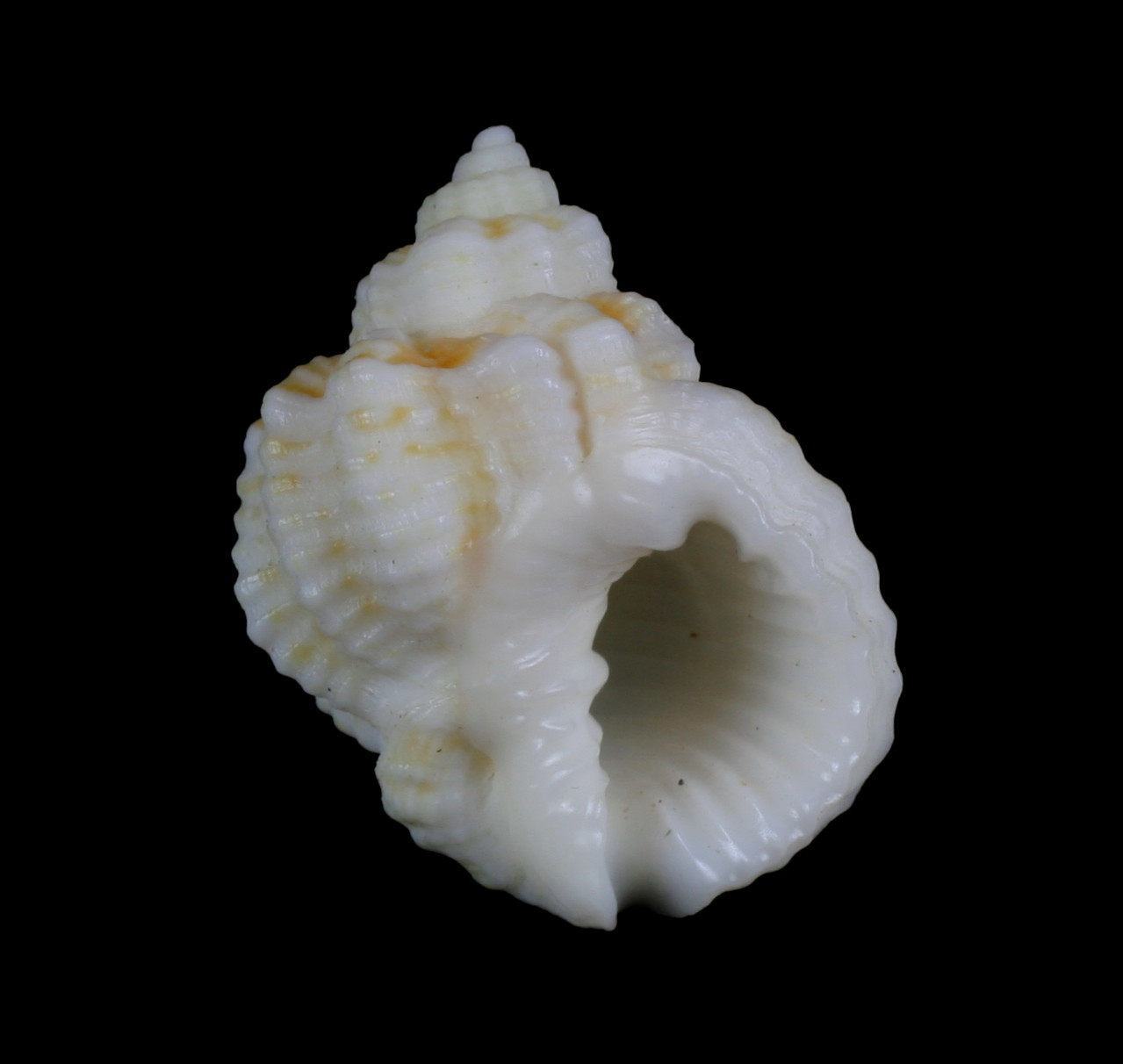
- Apertural view of shell of Bivetopsia rugosa

Scientific classification
- Kingdom: Animalia
- Phylum: Mollusca
- Class: Gastropoda
- Subclass: Caenogastropoda
- Order: Neogastropoda
- Family: Cancellariidae
- Genus: Bivetopsia
- Species: B. rugosum

Binomial name
- Bivetopsia rugosum (Lamarck, 1822)

= Bivetopsia rugosa =

Species of gastropod

Bivetopsia rugosum is a species of sea snail, a marine gastropod mollusc in the family Cancellariidae, the nutmeg snails.
