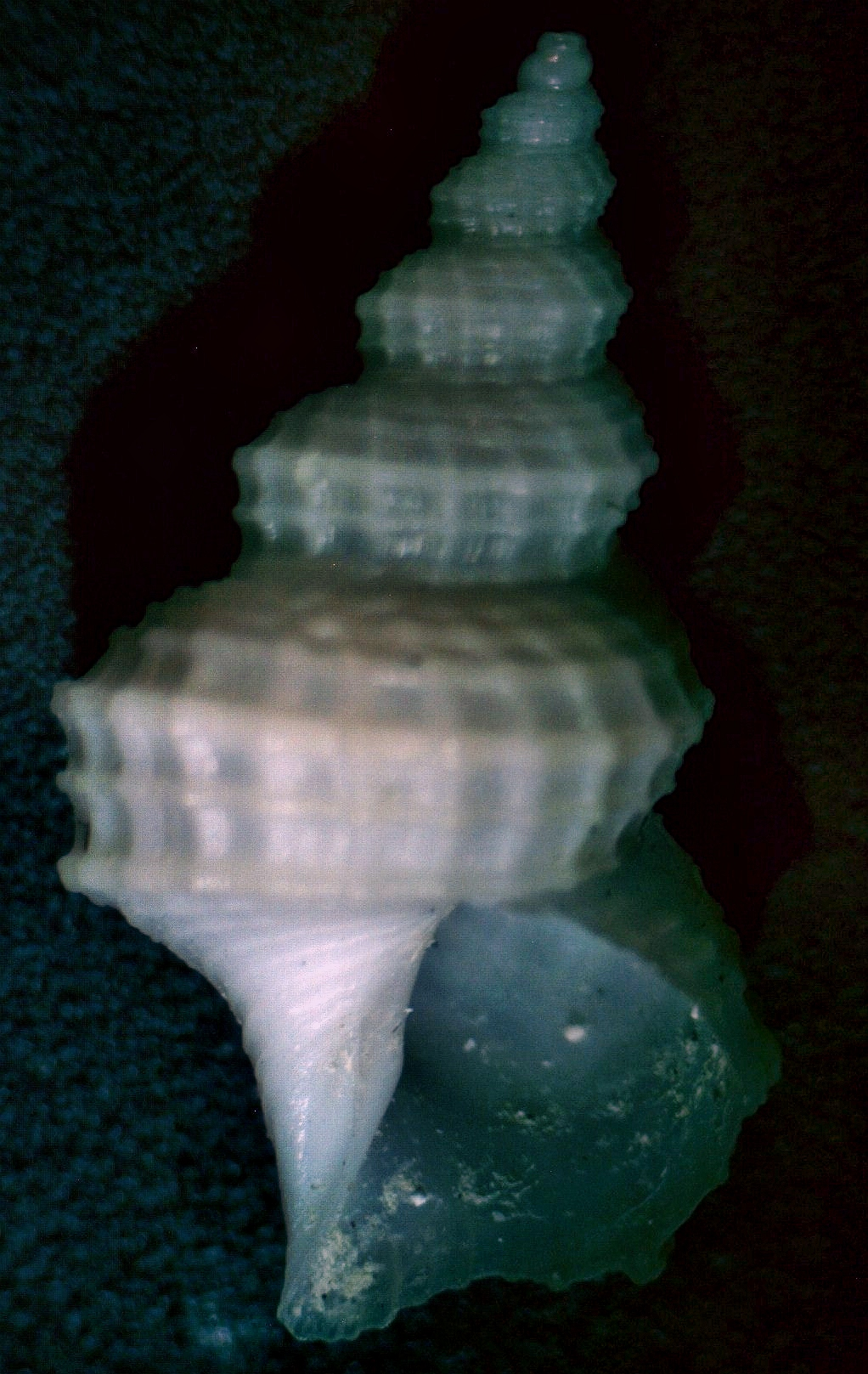
- Trichotropis turrita

Scientific classification
- Kingdom: Animalia
- Phylum: Mollusca
- Class: Gastropoda
- Subclass: Caenogastropoda
- Order: Littorinimorpha
- Superfamily: Capuloidea
- Family: Capulidae
- Genus: Trichotropis; Broderip & G.B. Sowerby I, 1829

Type species
- Turbo bicarinatus G. B. Sowerby I, 1825

Species
- See text

= Trichotropis =

Genus of gastropods

Trichotropis is a genus of small sea snails, marine gastropod molluscs in the family Capulidae, the cap snails.

== Species ==
Species within the genus Trichotropis include:

- Trichotropis bicarinata (Sowerby I, 1825)
- Trichotropis cancellata Hinds, 1843
- Trichotropis conica Møller, 1842
- Trichotropis pulcherrima Melvill & Standen, 1903
- Trichotropis townsendi Melvill & Standen, 1901
- Trichotropis turrita Dall, 1927
- Trichotropis zuluensis Barnard, 1963

Species brought into synonymy

- Trichotropis antarctica Thiele, 1912: synonym of Torellia antarctica (Thiele, 1912)
- Trichotropis atlantica Möller, 1842: synonym of Trichotropis borealis Broderip & Sowerby G.B. I, 1829
- Trichotropis bicarinatus: synonym of Trichotropis bicarinata (Sowerby I, 1825)
- Trichotropis blainvilleanus Petit de la Saussaye, 1851: synonym of Separatista helicoides (Gmelin, 1791)
- Trichotropis borealis Broderip & Sowerby G.B. I, 1829: synonym of Ariadnaria borealis (Broderip & G. B. Sowerby I, 1829)
- Trichotropis clathrata G. B. Sowerby II, 1874: synonym of Trichosirius inornatus (Hutton, 1873)
- Trichotropis conica Broderip & Sowerby, 1842: synonym of Trichotropis borealis Broderip & Sowerby G.B. I, 1829
- Trichotropis coronata Gould, 1860: synonym of Neoiphinoe coronata (Gould, 1860)
- Trichotropis costellata Couthouy, 1838: synonym of Trichotropis borealis Broderip & Sowerby G.B. I, 1829
- Trichotropis crassicostata Melvill, 1912: synonym of Verticosta crassicostata (Melvill, 1912)
- Trichotropis dorbignyanum Petit de la Saussaye, 1851: synonym of Coralliophila erosa (Röding, 1798)
- Trichotropis flavida Hinds, 1843: synonym of Separatista flavida (Hinds, 1843)
- Trichotropis gabrieli Pritchard & Gatliff, 1899: synonym of Separatista helicoides (Gmelin, 1791)
- Trichotropis gouldii A. Adams, 1857: synonym of Alora gouldii (A. Adams, 1857)
- Trichotropis hirsutus Golikov & Gulbin, 1978: synonym of Ariadnaria hirsuta (Golikov & Gulbin, 1978)
- Trichotropis inermis Hinds, 1877: synonym of Trichotropis borealis Broderip & Sowerby G.B. I, 1829
- Trichotropis inflata Friele, 1879: synonym of Iphinopsis inflata (Friele, 1879)
- Trichotropis inornata Hutton, 1873: synonym of Trichosirius inornatus (Hutton, 1873)
- Trichotropis insignis Middendorff, 1848: synonym of Ariadnaria insignis (Middendorff, 1848)
- Trichotropis kelseyi Dall, 1908: synonym of Iphinopsis kelseyi (Dall, 1908)
- Trichotropis kroeyeri Philippi, 1849: synonym of Neoiphinoe kroeyeri (Philippi, 1849)
- Trichotropis kroyeri Philippi, 1849: synonym of Neoiphinoe kroeyeri (Philippi, 1849)
- Trichotropis lomana Dall, 1918: synonym of Provanna lomana (Dall, 1918)
- Trichotropis migrans Dall, 1881: synonym of Verticosta migrans (Dall, 1881)
- Trichotropis nuda Dall, 1927: synonym of Iphinopsis nuda (Dall, 1927)
- Trichotropis orientalis Schepman, 1909: synonym of Akibumia orientalis (Schepman, 1909)
- Trichotropis pacifica Dall, 1908: synonym of Provanna pacifica (Dall, 1908)
- Trichotropis planispira E. A. Smith, 1915: synonym of Torellia planispira (E. A. Smith, 1915)
- Trichotropis saintjohnensis Verkrüzen, 1877: synonym of Trichotropis borealis Broderip & Sowerby G.B. I, 1829
- Trichotropis solida Aurivillius, 1885: synonym of Admete regina Dall, 1911
- Trichotropis tricarinata Brazier, 1878: synonym of Separatista helicoides (Gmelin, 1791)
