= Zygoceras biocalae =

Scientific classification
- Kingdom: Animalia
- Phylum: Mollusca
- Class: Gastropoda
- Subclass: Caenogastropoda
- Order: Littorinimorpha
- Superfamily: Capuloidea
- Family: Haloceratidae
- Genus: Zygoceras
- Species: Z. biocalae

Binomial name
- Zygoceras biocalae Warén & Bouchet, 1991

Species of mollusc

Zygoceras biocalae is a species of sea snail, a marine gastropoda mollusk in the family Haloceratidae.

== Description ==
The length of the shell attains 7 mm, its diameter 9.6 mm.

== Distribution ==
This marine species occurs off Isle of Pines, New Caledonia.
