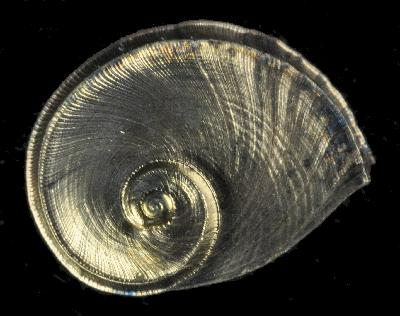
- Shell of Zygoceras tropidophorum (holotype at MNHN, Paris)

Scientific classification
- Kingdom: Animalia
- Phylum: Mollusca
- Class: Gastropoda
- Subclass: Caenogastropoda
- Order: Littorinimorpha
- Superfamily: Capuloidea
- Family: Haloceratidae
- Genus: Zygoceras
- Species: Z. tropidophorum

Binomial name
- Zygoceras tropidophorum Warén & Bouchet, 1991

Synonyms
- Zygoceras tropidophora Warén & Bouchet, 1991 (incorrect gender agreement of specific epithet)

= Zygoceras tropidophorum =

Species of mollusc

Zygoceras tropidophorum is a species of sea snail, a marine gastropoda mollusk in the family Haloceratidae.

== Description ==
The length of the shell attains 7.1 mm, its diameter 6.8 mm.

== Distribution ==
This marine species occurs off Ouvéa, New Caledonia.
