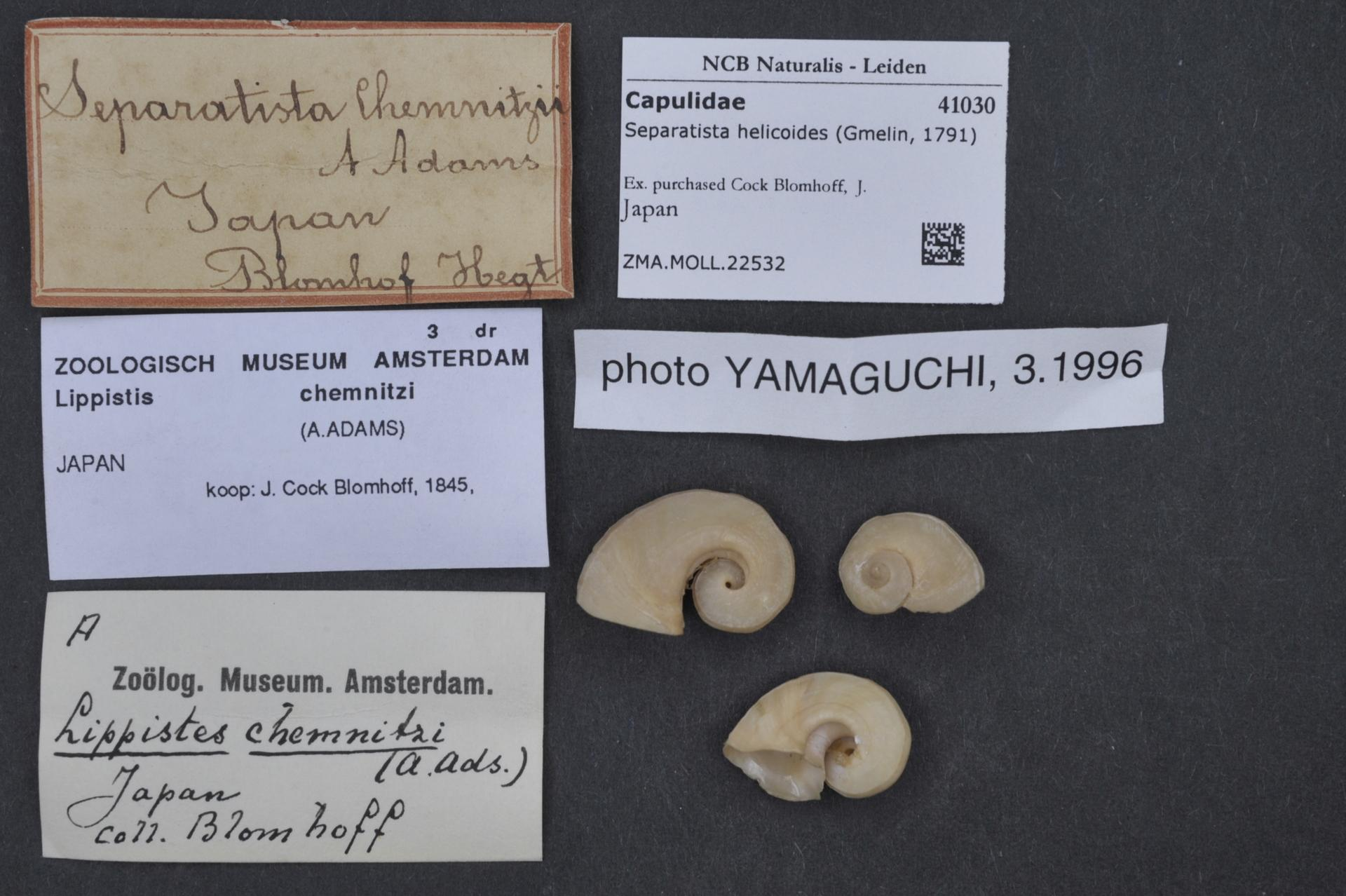
- Shell of Separatista helicoides (specimen at Naturalis Biodiversity Center)

Scientific classification
- Kingdom: Animalia
- Phylum: Mollusca
- Class: Gastropoda
- Subclass: Caenogastropoda
- Order: Littorinimorpha
- Superfamily: Capuloidea
- Family: Capulidae
- Genus: Separatista; Gray, 1847

Type species
- Turbo helicoides Gmelin, 1791

= Separatista =

Genus of gastropods

Separatista is a genus of sea snails, marine gastropod molluscs in the family Capulidae.

== Description ==
The turbinate shell is subdiscoidal. The first whorls are contiguous, the last more or less separated. The aperture is expanded, slightly angulated, the margin everted. The umbilicus is very wide, infundibuliform, with the whorls visible as far as the apex.

== Species ==
Species within the genus Separatista include:

- Separatista blainvilliana Petit de la Saussaye, 1851
- Separatista flavida (Hinds, 1843)
- Separatista globosa Poppe & Tagaro, 2026 (original description)
- Separatista helicoides (Gmelin, 1791)
- Separatista purpurabrunnea Poppe & Tagaro, 2026 (original description)
- Separatista separatista (Dillwyn, 1817)
- Separatista translucida Poppe & Tagaro, 2026

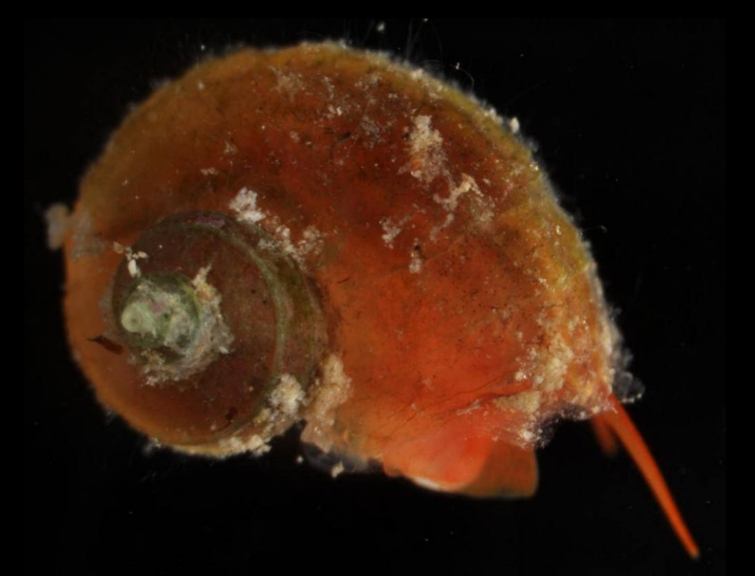
Separatista blainvilliana sitting on ascidian under rock; Moorea, Society Islands

Species brought into synonymy

- Separatista benhami Suter, 1902: synonym of Zelippistes benhami (Suter, 1902)
- Separatista chemnitzi (A. Adams, 1855): synonym of Separatista helicoides (Gmelin, 1791)
- Separatista fraterna Iredale, 1936: synonym of Separatista helicoides (Gmelin, 1791)
- Separatista gracilenta (Brazier, 1878): synonym of Separatista flavida (Hinds, 1843)
- Separatista grayi A. Adams, 1850 accepted as Lippistes cornu (Gmelin, 1791)
- Separatista helicoides (Gmelin, 1791) accepted as Separatista separatista (Dillwyn, 1817) (Based on Turbo helicoides Gmelin, 1791: 3598, non Turbo helicoides Gmelin, 1791: 3602; replaced by Turbo separatista Dillwyn, 1817.)
