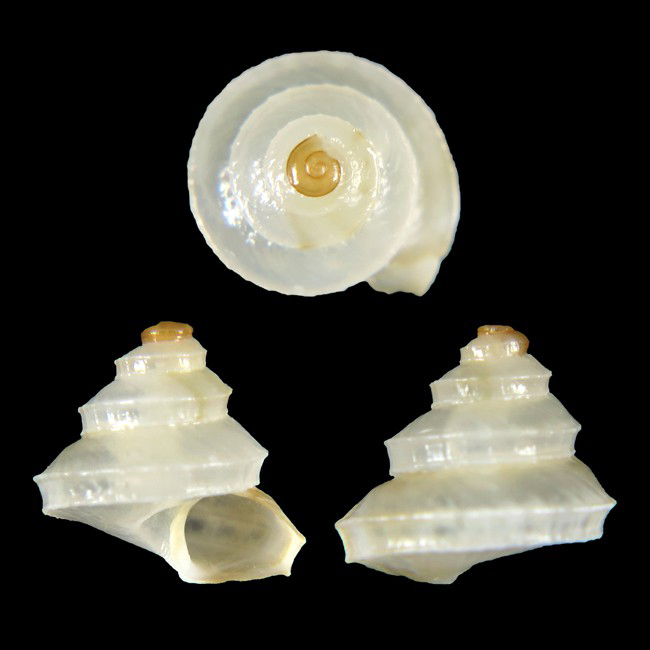

Scientific classification
- Kingdom: Animalia
- Phylum: Mollusca
- Class: Gastropoda
- Subclass: Caenogastropoda
- Order: Littorinimorpha
- Superfamily: Capuloidea
- Family: Haloceratidae
- Genus: Zygoceras
- Species: Z. okutanii

Binomial name
- Zygoceras okutanii Poppe & Tagaro, 2010

= Zygoceras okutanii =

Species of mollusc

Zygoceras okutanii is a species of sea snail, a marine gastropoda mollusk in the family Haloceratidae.

== Original description ==
- Poppe G. & Tagaro S. (2010) New species of Haloceratidae, Columbellidae, Buccinidae, Mitridae, Costellariidae, Amathinidae and Spondylidae from the Philippines. Visaya 3(1):73-93.

== Distribution ==
This marine species occurs off the Philippines.
