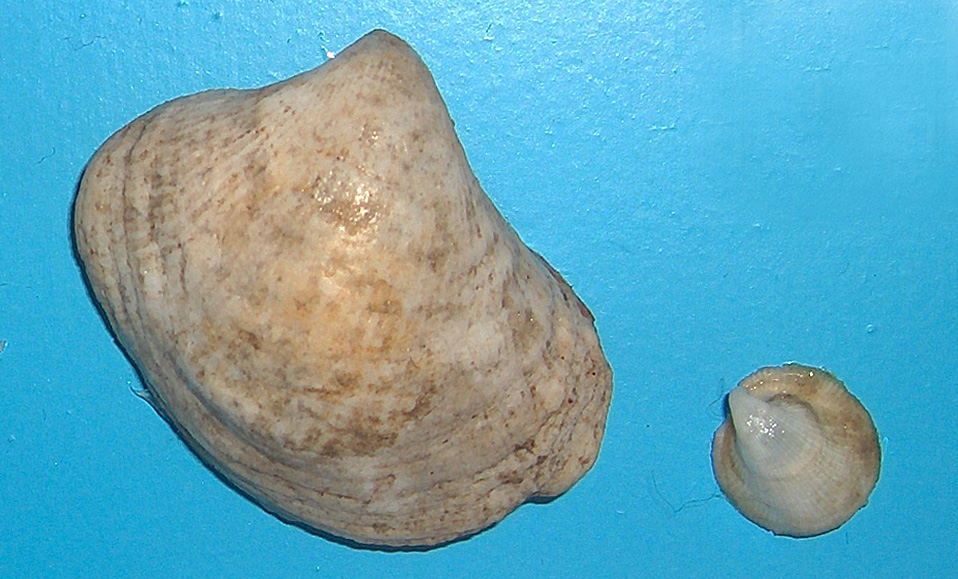
- Two shells of Capulus ungaricus with the periostracum removed

Scientific classification
- Kingdom: Animalia
- Phylum: Mollusca
- Class: Gastropoda
- Subclass: Caenogastropoda
- Order: Littorinimorpha
- Superfamily: Capuloidea
- Family: Capulidae
- Genus: Capulus; Montfort, 1810

Type species
- Patella ungarica Linnaeus, 1758

Synonyms
- Actita Fischer von Waldheim, 1823 (Unnecessary substitute name for Capulus and Pileopsis); Brocchia Bronn, 1828; Capulonix Iredale, 1929; Pileopsis Lamarck, 1822; Pileopsis (Brocchia) Bronn, 1828

= Capulus =

Capulus Temporal range: 443.8–0.0 Ma Silurian to Recent

Genus of gastropods

Capulus is a genus of small sea snails, marine gastropod mollusks in the family Capulidae, the cap snails.

== Species ==
Species within the genus Capulus include:

- Capulus badius Dunker, 1882
- Capulus californicus Dall, 1900
- Capulus compressus E. A. Smith, 1891
- Capulus daanbantayanensis Poppe & Tagaro, 2026
- Capulus danieli (Crosse, 1858)
- † Capulus deurganckensis Marquet & Landau, 2006
- Capulus devexus (May, 1916)
- Capulus dilatatus A. Adams, 1860
- Capulus elegans (Tapparone Canefri, 1877)
- Capulus fragilis E. A. Smith, 1904
- Capulus huangi S.-I Huang & Y.-F. Huang, 2012
- Capulus japonicus A. Adams, 1861
- Capulus kawamurai Habe, 1992
- Capulus ngai Thach, 2016
- Capulus novaezelandiae Dell, 1978
- Capulus otohimeae (Habe, 1946)
- † Capulus partimsinuosus (S. V. Wood, 1848)
- Capulus sericeus J. Burch & R. Burch, 1961
- Capulus simplex Locard, 1898
- † Capulus sinuosus (Brocchi, 1814)
- Capulus spondylicola Habe, 1967
- Capulus subcompressus Pelseneer, 1903
- Capulus ungaricoides (d'Orbigny, 1841)
- Capulus ungaricus (Linnaeus, 1758)
- Capulus violaceus Angas, 1867

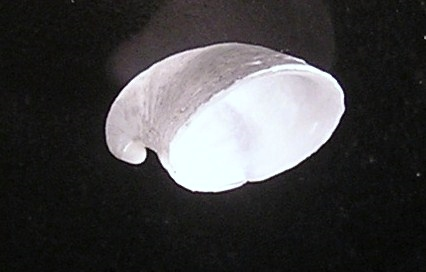
Capulus danieli

Species brought into synonymy

- Capulus bicarinatus (Pease, 1861a): synonym of Amathina bicarinata Pease, 1861
- Capulus chilensis Dall, 1904: synonym of Capulus ungaricoides (d'Orbigny, 1841)
- † Capulus corrugatus (extinct/fossil): synonym of † Capulus partimsinuosus (S. V. Wood, 1848)
- Capulus devotus Hedley, 1904: synonym of Malluvium devotum (Hedley, 1904) (original combination)
- Capulus galea Dall, 1889: synonym of Hyalorisia galea (Dall, 1889)
- Capulus galeus [sic]: synonym of Capulus galea Dall, 1889: synonym of Hyalorisia galea (Dall, 1889)
- Capulus hungaricus [sic]: synonym of Capulus ungaricus (Linnaeus, 1758)
- Capulus incurvus (Gmelin, 1791): synonym of Hipponix incurvus (Gmelin, 1791)
- Capulus intortus (Lamarck, 1822): synonym of Hipponix incurvus (Gmelin, 1791)
- Capulus kawamurai Habe, 1992: synonym of Capulus danieli (Crosse, 1858)
- Capulus liberatus Pease, 1868: synonym of Krebsia liberata (Pease, 1868)
- Capulus lissus E.A. Smith, 1894: synonym of Malluvium lissum (E. A. Smith, 1894)
- Capulus militaris (Linnaeus, 1771): synonym of Capulus ungaricus (Linnaeus, 1758)
- Capulus nutatus Hedley, 1908: synonym of Williamia radiata nutata (Hedley, 1908)
- Capulus radiatus M. Sars, 1851: synonym of Piliscus radiatus (Sars M., 1851): synonym of Piliscus commodus (Middendorff, 1851)
- Capulus sagittifer Gould, 1852: synonym of Phenacolepas sagittifer (Gould, 1852)
- Capulus shreevei Conrad, 1869: synonym of Cyrtopleura costata (Linnaeus, 1758)
- Capulus sycophanta Garrard, 1961: synonym of Capulus danieli (Crosse, 1858)
- Capulus uncinatus (Hutton, 1873): synonym of Capulus danieli (Crosse, 1858)

According to the Indo-Pacific Molluscan Database (OBIS) the following species names are also in current use

- Capulus irregularis E. A. Smith, 1895
- Capulus paleacea Menke
