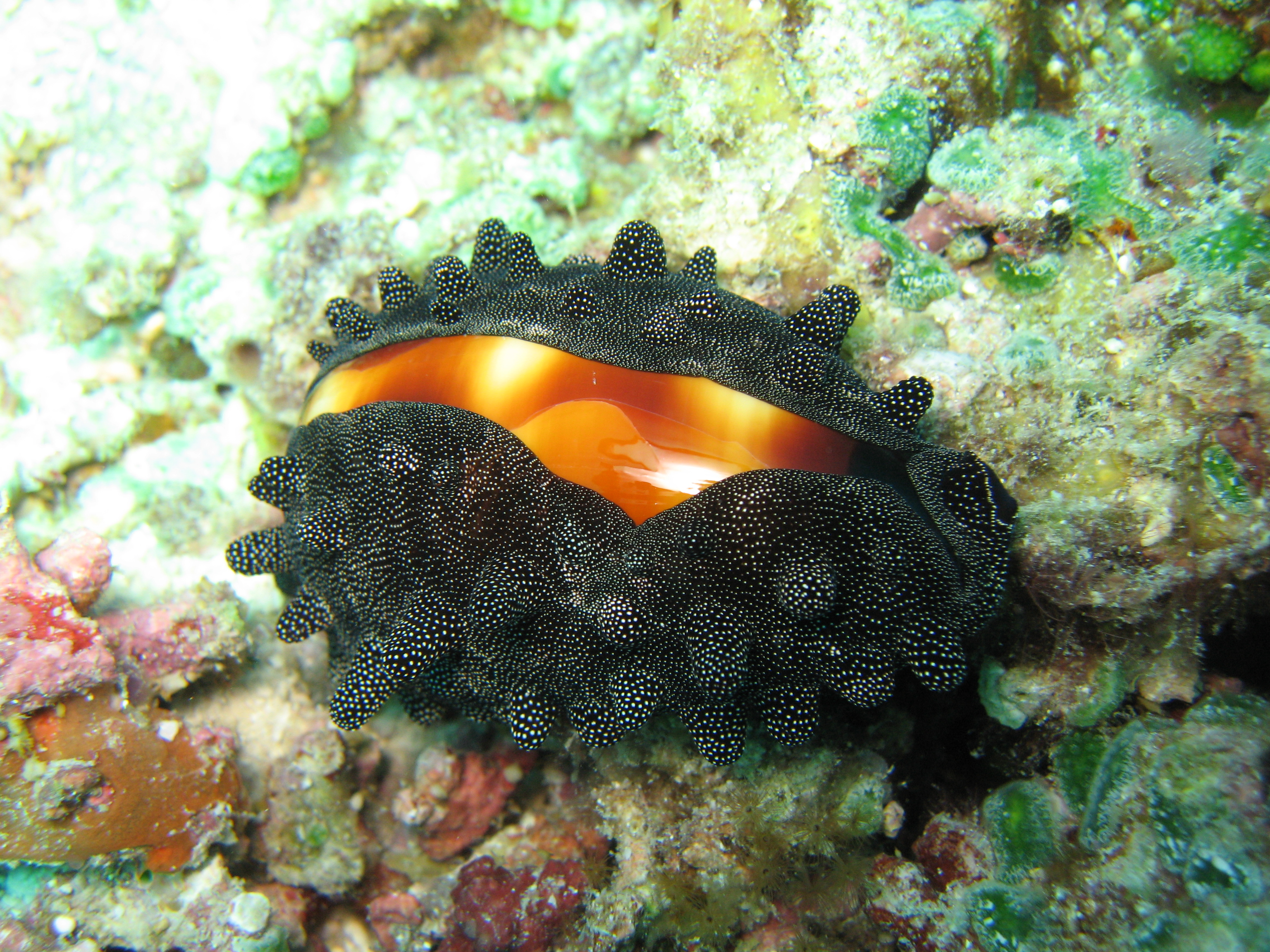
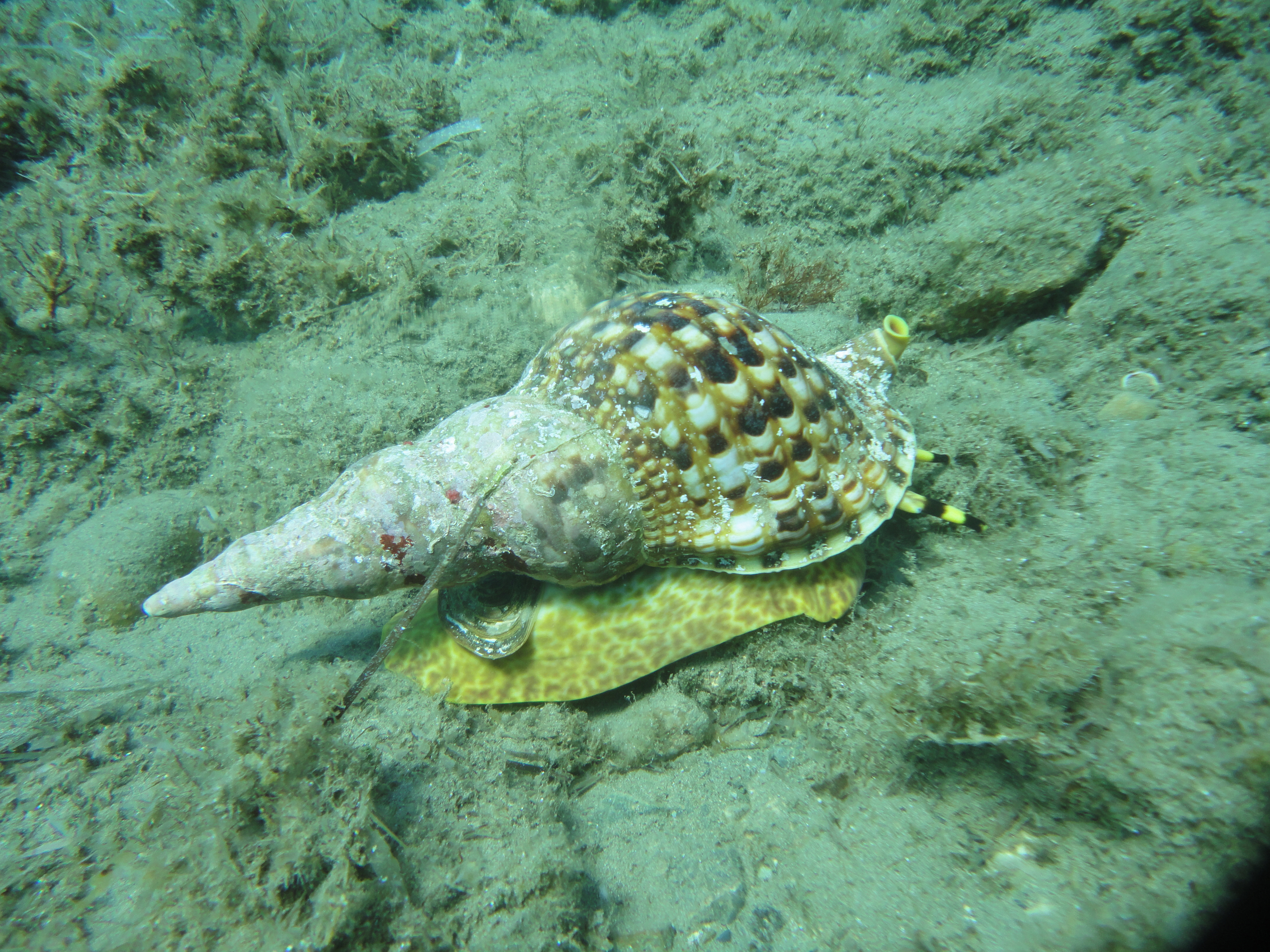
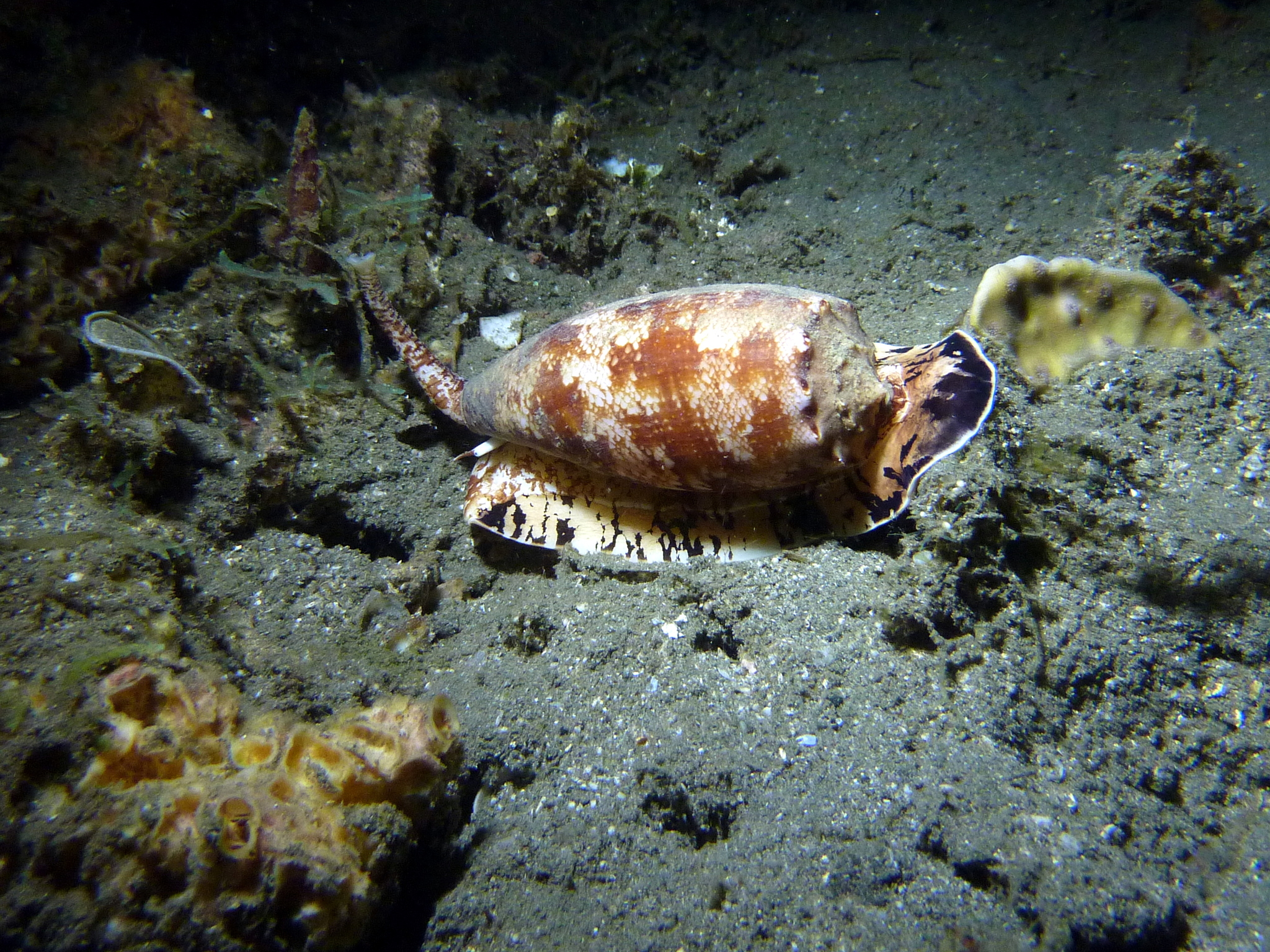
- Various latrogastropods (clockwise from top left): Talparia talpa (a cypraeoid), Charonia variegata (a tonnoid), Crepidula fornicata (a calyptraeoid), and Conus geographus (a neogastropod).

Scientific classification
- Kingdom: Animalia
- Phylum: Mollusca
- Class: Gastropoda
- Subclass: Caenogastropoda
- Clade: Hypsogastropoda
- Superorder: Latrogastropoda

Included groups
- Capuloidea; Calyptraeoidea; Cypraeoidea; Ficoidea; Stromboidea; Tonnoidea; Velutinoidea; Neogastropoda

= Latrogastropoda =

Clade of gastropods

Latrogastropoda is a clade of gastropods, considered a superorder, in the subclass Caenogastropoda. It was originally proposed in 2000 by Frank Riedel to unite the predominantly predatory "higher" caenogastropod groups. Latrogastropoda includes both the order Neogastropoda and some taxa classified in the paraphyletic order Littorinimorpha. Latrogastropoda is equivalent to the "siphonate group" of caenogastropods recognized by Ponder and colleagues in 2008. The non-neogastropod latrogastropods are broadly equivalent to the Neomesogastropoda. The name Strombogastropoda was proposed by Simone in 2011 for a clade uniting stromboids with neogastropods and their close relatives, and is equivalent to Ponder and colleagues' concept of Latrogastropoda.

== Included taxa ==
- Capuloidea: The families Capulidae and Haloceratidae were included in Latrogastropoda by Riedel in 2000 as members of Calyptraeoidea. Capuloidea was regarded as a separate superfamily by Bouchet and colleagues in 2017 and excluded from Latrogastropoda, but phylogenetic analysis has supported their membership in a well-supported clade with Calyptraeoidea, Velutinoidea, Tonnoidea, and Neogastropoda, and they were returned to Latrogastropoda by Donald Colgan and Winston Ponder in 2025.
- Calyptraeoidea
- Cypraeoidea
- Ficoidea
- Stromboidea: Stromboidea was not part of Riedel's original concept of Latrogastropoda, but was included in Latrogastropoda by Bouchet and colleagues in 2017. Stromboidea has been recovered as the sister taxon of a clade uniting Cypraeoidea with other latrogastropods by some phylogenetic analyses.
- Tonnoidea: Riedel included the superfamilies Laubierinoidea and Cassoidea in Latrogastropoda; both are now regarded as belonging to Tonnoidea.
- Velutinoidea: Riedel included the superfamily Lamellarioidea (now considered a synonym of Velutinoidea), consisting of Lamellariidae and Triviidae, as members of Latrogastropoda. The velutinoid families Eratoidae, Triviidae, and Velutinidae were included in Latrogastropoda as members of Cypraeoidea by Bouchet and colleagues in 2017, and were subsequently recognized as the separate superfamily Velutinoidea following the recognition that they form a well-supported clade with Calyptraeoidea, Capuloidea, Tonnoidea, and Neogastropoda to the exclusion of Cypraeoidea.
- Neogastropoda

=== Formerly included groups ===
- Naticoidea: Though Naticoidea was originally included in Latrogastropoda by Riedel, it was excluded from Latrogastropoda by Bouchet and colleagues in 2017 and phylogenetic analyses have shown Naticoidea to be closely related to Littorinidae.
- Hipponicidae: Hipponicidae was included in Calyptraeoidea by Riedel in 2000, but is now regarded as belonging to a separate superfamily, Hipponicoidea, and excluded from Latrogastropoda.

== Phylogenetic relationships ==
Fedosov et al. found the clade Latrogastropoda to be well-supported, with Stromboidea as its earliest-diverging member. The next group to diverge after Stromboidea was Cypraeoidea, then Calyptraeoidea. A clade uniting Ficoidea, Velutinoidea, Capuloidea, and Tonnoidea was found to be the sister taxon of Neogastropoda.

== Evolutionary history ==
Fossils recognizable as latrogastropods due to their protoconch are known as far back as the Aptian stage of the Cretaceous. Tonnoidea and Neogastropoda are potentially descendants of the Purpurinidae, which date to the Triassic. The earliest known cypraeids date to the Tithonian stage of the Jurassic.
