= Zygoceras aqabaense =

Scientific classification
- Kingdom: Animalia
- Phylum: Mollusca
- Class: Gastropoda
- Subclass: Caenogastropoda
- Order: Littorinimorpha
- Superfamily: Capuloidea
- Family: Haloceratidae
- Genus: Zygoceras
- Species: Z. aqabaense

Binomial name
- Zygoceras aqabaense Bandel, 2007

Synonyms
- Zygoceras aqabaensis Bandel, 2007 (ncorrect gender agreement of specific epithet)

Species of mollusc

Zygoceras aqabaense is a species of sea snail, a marine gastropoda mollusk in the family Haloceratidae.

== Distribution ==
This marine species occurs in the Gulf of Aqaba, Jordan.
