= Hipponix incurvus =

Scientific classification
- Kingdom: Animalia
- Phylum: Mollusca
- Class: Gastropoda
- Subclass: Caenogastropoda
- Order: Littorinimorpha
- Family: Hipponicidae
- Genus: Hipponix
- Species: H. incurvus

Binomial name
- Hipponix incurvus (Gmelin, 1791)

Synonyms
- Capulus incurvus (Gmelin, 1791); Capulus intortus (Lamarck, 1822); Krebsia incurva (Gmelin, 1791); Patella incurva Gmelin, 1791

Species of gastropod

Hipponix incurvus is a species of small sea snail, a marine gastropod mollusk in the family Hipponicidae, the hoof snails. Until recently this species was considered to be a species of Capulus in the Capulidae but was reclassified by Simone (2002)

== Distribution ==
This species occurs in the Atlantic Ocean from North Carolina to Brazil.

== Description ==
The maximum recorded shell length is 17 mm.

== Habitat ==
Minimum recorded depth is 0 m. Maximum recorded depth is 538 m.
