= Ariadnaria willetti =

Scientific classification
- Kingdom: Animalia
- Phylum: Mollusca
- Class: Gastropoda
- Subclass: Caenogastropoda
- Order: Littorinimorpha
- Family: Capulidae
- Genus: Ariadnaria
- Species: A. willetti

Binomial name
- Ariadnaria willetti R. N. Clark, 2022

Species of gastropod

Ariadnaria willetti is a species of small sea snail, a marine gastropod mollusk in the family Capulidae, the cap snails.

== Distribution ==
The holotype was found in the coastal waters of Southeast Alaska and British Columbia.
