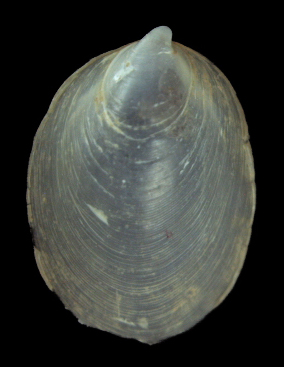
- Shell of Hyalorisia madagascarensis (holotype at MNHN, Paris)

Scientific classification
- Kingdom: Animalia
- Phylum: Mollusca
- Class: Gastropoda
- Subclass: Caenogastropoda
- Order: Littorinimorpha
- Superfamily: Capuloidea
- Family: Capulidae
- Genus: Hyalorisia; Dall, 1889

Type species
- Capulus galea Dall, 1889

Synonyms
- Capulus (Hyalorisia) Dall, 1889

= Hyalorisia =

Genus of gastropods

Hyalorisia is a genus of small sea snails, marine gastropod mollusks in the family Capulidae, the cap snails.

== Species ==
Species within the genus Hyalorisia include:

- Hyalorisia fragilis (E. A. Smith, 1904)
- Hyalorisia galea (Dall, 1889)
- Hyalorisia kely Fassio, Bouchet & Oliverio, 2020
- Hyalorisia lehibe Fassio, Bouchet & Oliverio, 2020
- Hyalorisia madagascarensis Fassio, Bouchet & Oliverio, 2020
- Hyalorisia melanesica Fassio, Bouchet & Oliverio, 2020
- Hyalorisia nanhaiensis Fassio, Bouchet & Oliverio, 2020
- Hyalorisia neocaledonica Fassio, Bouchet & Oliverio, 2020
- † Hyalorisia nettlesi (J. E. Robinson, 1983)
- Hyalorisia nupta Fassio, Bouchet & Oliverio, 2020
- Hyalorisia profunda Fassio, Bouchet & Oliverio, 2020
- Hyalorisia solomonensis Fassio, Bouchet & Oliverio, 2020
- Hyalorisia tosaensis (Otuka, 1939)
