= Capulus subcompressus =

Scientific classification
- Kingdom: Animalia
- Phylum: Mollusca
- Class: Gastropoda
- Subclass: Caenogastropoda
- Order: Littorinimorpha
- Family: Capulidae
- Genus: Capulus
- Species: C. subcompressus

Binomial name
- Capulus subcompressus Pelseneer, 1903

Species of gastropod

Capulus subcompressus is a species of small sea snail, a marine gastropod mollusk in the family Capulidae, the cap snails.

== Distribution ==
This species occurs in the Weddell Sea, off Antarctica

== Description ==
The maximum recorded shell length is 6.6 mm.

== Habitat ==
Minimum recorded depth is 283 m. Maximum recorded depth is 430 m.
