= Torellia didyma =

Scientific classification
- Kingdom: Animalia
- Phylum: Mollusca
- Class: Gastropoda
- Subclass: Caenogastropoda
- Order: Littorinimorpha
- Family: Capulidae
- Genus: Torellia
- Species: T. didyma

Binomial name
- Torellia didyma Bouchet & Warén, 1993

Species of gastropod

Torellia didyma is a species of small sea snail, a marine gastropod mollusk in the family Capulidae, the cap snails.
