= Torellia smithi =

Scientific classification
- Kingdom: Animalia
- Phylum: Mollusca
- Class: Gastropoda
- Subclass: Caenogastropoda
- Order: Littorinimorpha
- Family: Capulidae
- Genus: Torellia
- Species: T. smithi

Binomial name
- Torellia smithi Waren, Arnaud & Cantera, 1986

Synonyms
- Neoconcha vestita E. A. Smith, 1907

Species of gastropod

Torellia smithi is a species of small sea snail, a marine gastropod mollusk in the family Capulidae, the cap snails.

== Description ==
The maximum recorded shell length is 28 mm.

== Habitat ==
Minimum recorded depth is 265 m. Maximum recorded depth is 695 m.
