= Ariadnaria alexandrae =

Scientific classification
- Kingdom: Animalia
- Phylum: Mollusca
- Class: Gastropoda
- Subclass: Caenogastropoda
- Order: Littorinimorpha
- Family: Capulidae
- Genus: Ariadnaria
- Species: A. alexandrae

Binomial name
- Ariadnaria alexandrae Egorov & Alexeyev, 1998

Species of gastropod

Ariadnaria alexandrae is a species of small sea snail, a marine gastropod mollusk in the family Capulidae, the cap snails.

== Description ==
The length of the shell attains 15 mm.

== Distribution ==
This species occurs in the Sakhalin Bay, Sea of Okhotsk at depths between 68 m and 303 m.
