= Trichosirius cavatocarinatus =

Scientific classification
- Kingdom: Animalia
- Phylum: Mollusca
- Class: Gastropoda
- Subclass: Caenogastropoda
- Order: Littorinimorpha
- Family: Capulidae
- Genus: Trichosirius
- Species: T. cavatocarinatus

Binomial name
- Trichosirius cavatocarinatus (Laws, 1940)

Synonyms
- Certhioderma cavatocarinatus Laws, 1940

Species of gastropod

Trichosirius cavatocarinatus is a species of sea snail, a marine gastropod mollusc in the family Capulidae, the cap snails.
