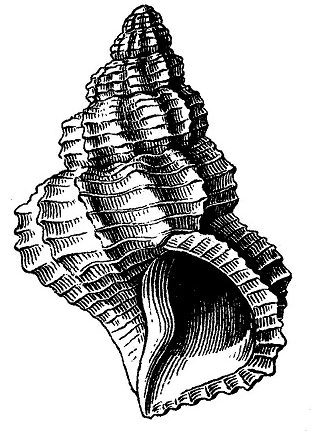
- Original image of a shell of Verticosta migrans

Scientific classification
- Kingdom: Animalia
- Phylum: Mollusca
- Class: Gastropoda
- Subclass: Caenogastropoda
- Order: Littorinimorpha
- Superfamily: Capuloidea
- Family: Capulidae
- Genus: Verticosta; S.-I Huang & M.-H. Lin, 2020

Type species
- Trichotropis migrans Dall, 1881

= Verticosta =

Genus of gastropods

Verticosta is a genus of sea snails, marine gastropod molluscs, in the family Capulidae.

== Species ==
Species within the genus Verticosta include:

- Verticosta campanella S.-I Huang & M.-H. Lin, 2020
- Verticosta crassicostata (Melvill, 1912)
- Verticosta lanterna S.-I Huang & M.-H. Lin, 2020
- Verticosta migrans (Dall, 1881)
- Verticosta robusta S.-I Huang & M.-H. Lin, 2020
