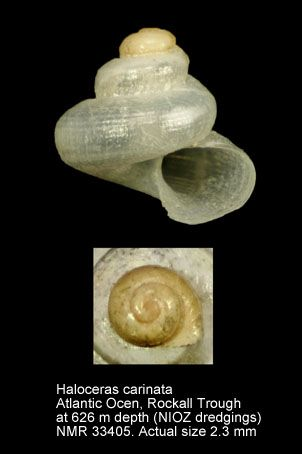

Scientific classification
- Kingdom: Animalia
- Phylum: Mollusca
- Class: Gastropoda
- Subclass: Caenogastropoda
- Order: Littorinimorpha
- Family: Haloceratidae
- Genus: Haloceras
- Species: H. carinatum

Binomial name
- Haloceras carinatum (Jeffreys, 1883)

Synonyms
- Cithna carinata Jeffreys, 1883 (basionym); Haloceras carinata (Jeffreys, 1883) (incorrect gender agreement of specific epithet); Solariella (Micropiliscus) constricta Dall, 1927; Solariella constricta Dall, 1927

= Haloceras carinatum =

Species of gastropod

Haloceras carinatum is a species of sea snail, a marine gastropod mollusc in the family Haloceratidae.

== Distribution ==
This species occurs in European waters.
