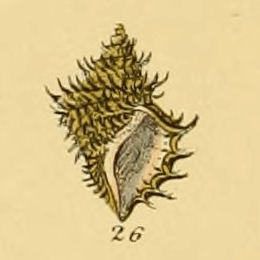
- Ariadnaria borealis shell

Scientific classification
- Kingdom: Animalia
- Phylum: Mollusca
- Class: Gastropoda
- Subclass: Caenogastropoda
- Order: Littorinimorpha
- Superfamily: Capuloidea
- Family: Capulidae
- Genus: Ariadnaria; Habe, 1961

Synonyms
- Ariadna P. Fischer, 1864 junior homonym (junior homonym of Ariadna Audouin, 1826 [Arachnida]; Ariadnaria is a replacement name; Trichotropis (Ariadna) P. Fischer, 1864 (junior homonym of Ariadna Audouin, 1826 [Arachnida]; Ariadnaria is a replacement name)

= Ariadnaria =

Genus of gastropods

Ariadnaria is a genus of small sea snails, marine gastropod mollusks in the family Capulidae, the cap snails.

== Species ==
Species within the genus Ariadnaria include:

- Ariadnaria acutiminata (Golikov & Gulbin, 1978)
- † Ariadnaria ainikta Saul & Squires, 2008
- † Ariadnaria aldersoni Saul & Squires, 2008
- Ariadnaria alexandrae Egorov & Alexeyev, 1998
- Ariadnaria borealis (Broderip & G. B. Sowerby I, 1829)
- Ariadnaria conica (Møller, 1842)
- Ariadnaria densecostata Golikov, 1986
- Ariadnaria exigua R. N. Clark, 2022
- Ariadnaria hirsuta (Golikov & Gulbin, 1978)
- Ariadnaria insignis (Middendorff, 1848)
- † Ariadnaria obstricta (C. A. White, 1889)
- † Ariadnaria stibara Saul & Squires, 2008
- Ariadnaria willetti R. N. Clark, 2022

Synonyms

- Ariadnaria exiguus R. N. Clark, 2022: synonym of Ariadnaria exigua R. N. Clark, 2022 (incorrect grammatical agreement of specific epithet)
