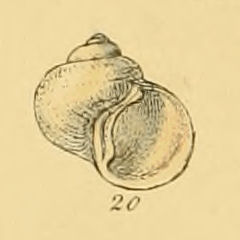
- Torellia delicata shell

Scientific classification
- Kingdom: Animalia
- Phylum: Mollusca
- Class: Gastropoda
- Subclass: Caenogastropoda
- Order: Littorinimorpha
- Family: Capulidae
- Genus: Torellia
- Species: T. delicata

Binomial name
- Torellia delicata (Philippi, 1844)

Synonyms
- List: Cyclostoma delicatum R. A. Philippi, 1844; Recluzia aperta Jeffreys, 1859; Torellia delicatula (Philippi, 1844); Torellia fimbriata Verrill & Smith, 1882; Torellia vestita Jeffreys, 1867; Trachysma delicata (R. A. Philippi, 1844); Trachysma sarsiana Thiele, 1912; Trachysma sarsianum Thiele, 1912

= Torellia delicata =

Species of gastropod

Torellia delicata, commonly known as the Veiled Hairysnail, is a species of small sea snail, a marine gastropod mollusk in the family Capulidae, the cap snails.

== Description ==
The maximum recorded shell length was 17 mm.

== Habitat ==
Minimum recorded depth is 156 m. Maximum recorded depth is 2100 m.
