= Torellia mirabilis =

Scientific classification
- Kingdom: Animalia
- Phylum: Mollusca
- Class: Gastropoda
- Subclass: Caenogastropoda
- Order: Littorinimorpha
- Family: Capulidae
- Genus: Torellia
- Species: T. mirabilis

Binomial name
- Torellia mirabilis (Smith, 1907)

Synonyms
- Trichoconcha mirabilis E. A. Smith, 1907

Species of gastropod

Torellia mirabilis is a species of small sea snail, a marine gastropod mollusk in the family Capulidae, the cap snails.

== Description ==
The maximum recorded shell length is 42 mm.

== Habitat ==
Minimum recorded depth is 73 m. Maximum recorded depth is 662 m.
