= Neoiphinoe arctica =

Scientific classification
- Kingdom: Animalia
- Phylum: Mollusca
- Class: Gastropoda
- Subclass: Caenogastropoda
- Order: Littorinimorpha
- Family: Capulidae
- Genus: Neoiphinoe
- Species: N. arctica

Binomial name
- Neoiphinoe arctica (Middendorff, 1849)

Synonyms
- Admete arctica (Middendorff, 1849); Cancellaria arctica Middendorff, 1849

Species of gastropod

Neoiphinoe arctica is a species of sea snail, a marine gastropod mollusk in the family Capulidae, the cap snails.

== Distribution ==
This marine species occurs in the Bering Strait.
