= Trichotropis conica =

Scientific classification
- Kingdom: Animalia
- Phylum: Mollusca
- Class: Gastropoda
- Subclass: Caenogastropoda
- Order: Littorinimorpha
- Family: Capulidae
- Genus: Trichotropis
- Species: T. conica

Binomial name
- Trichotropis conica Møller, 1842

Synonyms
- Trichotropis conicus Møller, 1842 (wrong grammatical agreement of epithet)

Species of gastropod

Trichotropis conica is a species of small sea snail, a marine gastropod mollusc in the family Capulidae, the cap snails.

== Distribution ==
This marine species occurs off Greenland and Northern Canada.
