= Ariadnaria exigua =

Scientific classification
- Kingdom: Animalia
- Phylum: Mollusca
- Class: Gastropoda
- Subclass: Caenogastropoda
- Order: Littorinimorpha
- Family: Capulidae
- Genus: Ariadnaria
- Species: A. exigua

Binomial name
- Ariadnaria exigua R. N. Clark, 2022

Synonyms
- Ariadnaria exiguus R. N. Clark, 2022 incorrect grammatical agreement of specific epithet

Species of gastropod

Ariadnaria exigua is a species of small sea snail, a marine gastropod mollusk in the family Capulidae, the cap snails.

== Distribution ==
The holotype was found off the Aleutian Islands.
