= Torellia cornea =

Scientific classification
- Kingdom: Animalia
- Phylum: Mollusca
- Class: Gastropoda
- Subclass: Caenogastropoda
- Order: Littorinimorpha
- Family: Capulidae
- Genus: Torellia
- Species: T. cornea

Binomial name
- Torellia cornea Powell, 1951

Species of gastropod

Torellia cornea is a species of small sea snail, a marine gastropod mollusk in the family Capulidae, the cap snails.

== Description ==
The maximum recorded shell length is 19.4 mm.

== Habitat ==
Minimum recorded depth is 500 m. Maximum recorded depth is 2818 m.
