= Ariadnaria acutiminata =

Scientific classification
- Kingdom: Animalia
- Phylum: Mollusca
- Class: Gastropoda
- Subclass: Caenogastropoda
- Order: Littorinimorpha
- Family: Capulidae
- Genus: Ariadnaria
- Species: A. acutiminata

Binomial name
- Ariadnaria acutiminata (A. N. Golikov & Gulbin, 1978)

Synonyms
- Trichotropis acutiminata A. N. Golikov & Gulbin, 1978

Species of gastropod

Ariadnaria acutiminata is a species of small sea snail, a marine gastropod mollusk in the family Capulidae, the cap snails.

== Description ==
The length of the shell attains 13.8 mm.

== Distribution ==
This species occurs off the Kuril Islands at depths between 20 m and 40 m.
