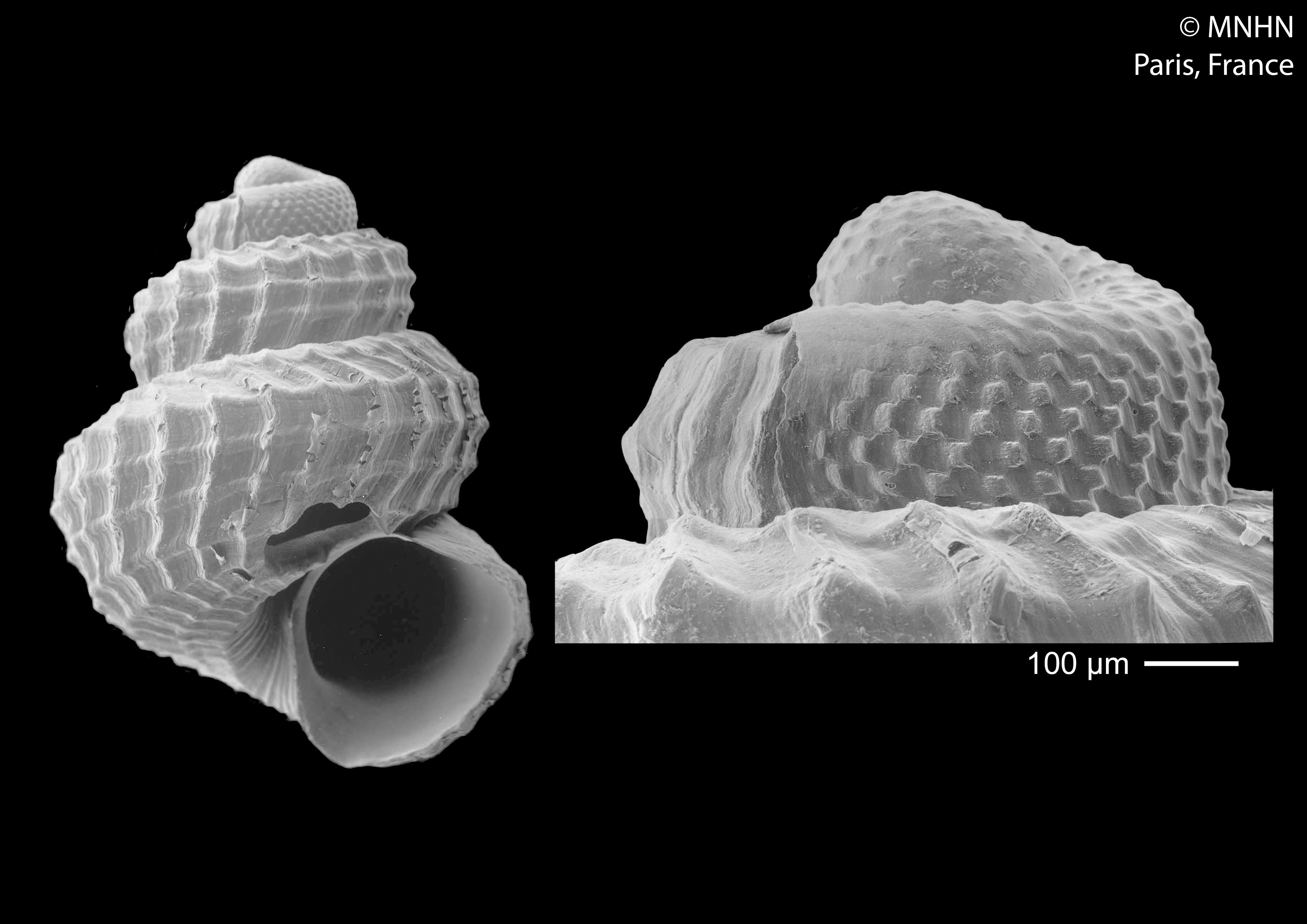
- Shell of Haloceras meteoricum (paratype at MNHN, Paris)

Scientific classification
- Kingdom: Animalia
- Phylum: Mollusca
- Class: Gastropoda
- Subclass: Caenogastropoda
- Order: Littorinimorpha
- Superfamily: Capuloidea
- Family: Haloceratidae
- Genus: Haloceras; Dall, 1889

Synonyms
- Micropiliscus Dall, 1927; Separatista (Haloceras) Dall, 1889 (original rank); Solariella (Micropiliscus) Dall, 1927

= Haloceras =

Genus of gastropods

Haloceras is a genus of sea snails, marine gastropod mollusks in the family Haloceratidae.

== Species ==
- Haloceras acrocomatum Warén & Bouchet, 1991
- Haloceras carinatum (Jeffreys, 1883)
- Haloceras cingulatum (Verrill, 1884)
- † Haloceras contribule Bertolaso & Palazzi, 2000
- Haloceras exquisitum Warén & Bouchet, 1991
- Haloceras galeritum Warén & Bouchet, 1991
- Haloceras heliptyx Warén & Bouchet, 1991
- Haloceras japonicum Okutani, 1964
- Haloceras laxum (Jeffreys, 1885)
- † Haloceras maxwelli Beu & B. A. Marshall, 2011
- Haloceras mediocostatum (Dautzenberg & H. Fischer, 1896)
- Haloceras meteoricum Gofas, 2018
- Haloceras millestriatum (Okutani, 1964)
- Haloceras phaeocephalum Warén & Bouchet, 1991
- Haloceras rugosum Warén & Bouchet, 1991
- Haloceras spinosum Warén & Bouchet, 1991
- Haloceras tricarinatum (Jeffreys, 1885)
- Haloceras trichotropoides Warén & Bouchet, 1991

Synonyms

- Haloceras acrocomata Warén & Bouchet, 1991 : synonym of Haloceras acrocomatum Warén & Bouchet, 1991 (incorrect gender agreement of specific epithet)
- Haloceras carinata (Jeffreys, 1883) : synonym of Haloceras carinatum (Jeffreys, 1883) (incorrect gender agreement of specific epithet)
- Haloceras cingulata (Verrill, 1884) : synonym of Haloceras cingulatum (Verrill, 1884) (incorrect gender agreement of specific epithet)
- Haloceras contribulis Bertolaso & Palazzi, 2000 † : synonym of Haloceras contribule Bertolaso & Palazzi, 2000 † (incorrect gender agreement of specific epithet)
- Haloceras exquisita Warén & Bouchet, 1991 : synonym of Haloceras exquisitum Warén & Bouchet, 1991 (incorrect gender agreement of specific epithet)
- Haloceras galerita Warén & Bouchet, 1991 : synonym of Haloceras galeritum Warén & Bouchet, 1991 (incorrect gender agreement of specific epithet)
- Haloceras japonica Okutani, 1964 : synonym of Haloceras japonicum Okutani, 1964 (incorrect gender agreement of specific epithet)
- Haloceras laxa (Jeffreys, 1885) : synonym of Haloceras laxum (Jeffreys, 1885) (incorrect gender agreement of specific epithet)
- Haloceras mediocostata (Dautzenberg & H. Fischer, 1896) : synonym of Haloceras mediocostatum (Dautzenberg & H. Fischer, 1896) (incorrect gender agreement of specific epithet)
- Haloceras millestriata (Okutani, 1964) : synonym of Haloceras millestriatum (Okutani, 1964) (incorrect gender agreement of specific epithet)
- Haloceras phaeocephala Warén & Bouchet, 1991 : synonym of Haloceras phaeocephalum Warén & Bouchet, 1991 (incorrect gender agreement of specific epithet)
- Haloceras rugosa Warén & Bouchet, 1991 : synonym of Haloceras rugosum Warén & Bouchet, 1991 (incorrect gender agreement of specific epithet)
- Haloceras spinosa Warén & Bouchet, 1991 : synonym of Haloceras spinosum Warén & Bouchet, 1991 (incorrect gender agreement of specific epithet)
- Haloceras tricarinata (Jeffreys, 1885) : synonym of Haloceras tricarinatum (Jeffreys, 1885) (incorrect gender agreement of specific epithet)
