= Capulus elegans =

Scientific classification
- Kingdom: Animalia
- Phylum: Mollusca
- Class: Gastropoda
- Subclass: Caenogastropoda
- Order: Littorinimorpha
- Family: Capulidae
- Genus: Capulus
- Species: C. elegans

Binomial name
- Capulus elegans (Tapparone Canefri, 1877)

Synonyms
- Capula elegans Tapparone Canefri, 1877; Capulus (Thyca) elegans Tapparone Canefri, 1877

Species of gastropod

Capulus elegans is a species of small sea snail in the genus Capulus.
