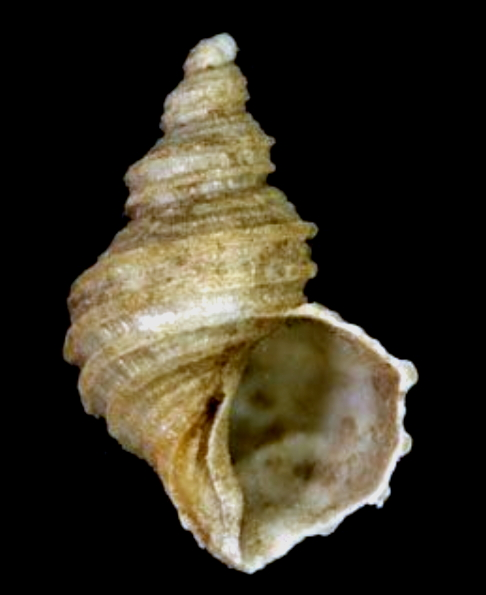
- Ariadnaria borealis shell (specimen at the Natural History Museum, Rotterdam)

Scientific classification
- Kingdom: Animalia
- Phylum: Mollusca
- Class: Gastropoda
- Subclass: Caenogastropoda
- Order: Littorinimorpha
- Family: Capulidae
- Genus: Ariadnaria
- Species: A. borealis

Binomial name
- Ariadnaria borealis (Broderip & G. B. Sowerby I, 1829)

Synonyms
- Fusus umbilicatus T. Brown, 1839 (possible senior synonym, never used in recent literature); Trichotropis acuminatus Jeffreys, 1867 (dubious synonym); Trichotropis atlantica Möller, 1842; Trichotropis borealis Broderip & Sowerby, 1829; Trichotropis borealis var. acuminata Hägg, 1905; Trichotropis costellata Couthouy, 1838; Trichotropis costellatus Couthouy, 1838 ·; Trichotropis herzensteini Derjugin et Gurjanova, 1926; Trichotropis inermis Hinds, 1877; Trichotropis saintjohnensis Verkrüzen, 1877

= Ariadnaria borealis =

Species of gastropod

Ariadnaria borealis, commonly referred to as the boreal hairysnail, is a species of small sea snail, a marine gastropod mollusk in the family Capulidae, the cap snails.

== Distribution ==
This species occurs in the North Sea, the Canadian part of the Arctic Ocean, in the Northwest Atlantic Ocean; circumpolar in the Arctica, the White Sea, and in the Pacific from Peter the Great Gulf and northern Japan.

== Description ==
The maximum recorded shell length is 22 mm.

The shell has a rather oblong shape, featuring three to four whorls that are somewhat rounded. It is equipped with three or four not very prominent, obtuse keels, with smaller intervening striae that are crossed by the lines of growth. The columella and the siphonal canal immediately below it are somewhat more elongated than in the previous species. The umbilicus is also slightly more expanded, making it less linear compared to the Trichotropis bicarinata. Along its edge and on the keels of the exterior of the shell, the epidermis presents numerous bristle-like appendages.

== Habitat ==
Minimum recorded depth is 2 m. Maximum recorded depth is 574 m.
