= Ariadnaria densecostata =

Scientific classification
- Kingdom: Animalia
- Phylum: Mollusca
- Class: Gastropoda
- Subclass: Caenogastropoda
- Order: Littorinimorpha
- Family: Capulidae
- Genus: Ariadnaria
- Species: A. densecostata

Binomial name
- Ariadnaria densecostata A. N. Golikov, 1986

Species of gastropod

Ariadnaria densecostata is a species of small sea snail, a marine gastropod mollusk in the family Capulidae, the cap snails.

== Description ==
The length of the shell attains 17.3 mm.

== Distribution ==
The holotype was found in the northern Bering Sea and in the southern Chukchi Sea at depths down to 50 m.
