= Trichosirius octocarinatus =

Scientific classification
- Kingdom: Animalia
- Phylum: Mollusca
- Class: Gastropoda
- Subclass: Caenogastropoda
- Order: Littorinimorpha
- Family: Capulidae
- Genus: Trichosirius
- Species: T. octocarinatus

Binomial name
- Trichosirius octocarinatus Powell, 1931

Species of gastropod

Trichosirius octocarinatus is a species of small sea snail, a marine gastropod mollusc in the family Capulidae, the cap snails.
