= Ariadnaria conica =

Scientific classification
- Kingdom: Animalia
- Phylum: Mollusca
- Class: Gastropoda
- Subclass: Caenogastropoda
- Order: Littorinimorpha
- Family: Capulidae
- Genus: Ariadnaria
- Species: A. conica

Binomial name
- Ariadnaria conica (Møller, 1842)

Synonyms
- Trichotropis conica Møller, 1842 (original combination); Trichotropis conicus Møller, 1842 (wrong grammatical agreement of epithet)

Species of gastropod

Ariadnaria conica is a species of small sea snail, a marine gastropod mollusk in the family Capulidae, the cap snails.

== Description ==
The length of the shell attains 16 mm.

(Original description in Latin) This sub-conical, sub-umbilicated yellow shell has six angular whorls. The first is somewhat rounded, while the body whorl is more swollen, adorned with elevated longitudinal lines. Among these lines, two stand out prominently, and the lower part of these lines sharply separates the base from the upper part of the shell.

== Distribution ==
The holotype was found off western Greenland. Further distribution: from Japan Sea to Chukchi Sea, southwestern Barents Sea and the Laptev Sea at depths down to 200 m; also off Alaska.
