= Neoiphinoe echinata =

Iphinoe echinata

Scientific classification
- Kingdom: Animalia
- Phylum: Mollusca
- Class: Gastropoda
- Subclass: Caenogastropoda
- Order: Littorinimorpha
- Family: Capulidae
- Genus: Neoiphinoe
- Species: N. echinata

Binomial name
- Neoiphinoe echinata (Egorov & Alexeyev, 1998)

Synonyms
- Iphinoe echinata Egorov & Alexeyev, 1998

Species of gastropod

Neoiphinoe echinata is a species of small sea snail, a marine gastropod mollusk in the family Capulidae, the cap snails.
