= Capulus simplex =

Scientific classification
- Kingdom: Animalia
- Phylum: Mollusca
- Class: Gastropoda
- Subclass: Caenogastropoda
- Order: Littorinimorpha
- Family: Capulidae
- Genus: Capulus
- Species: C. simplex

Binomial name
- Capulus simplex Locard, 1898

Species of gastropod

Capulus simplex is a species of small sea snail, a marine gastropod mollusk in the family Capulidae, the cap snails.

== Description ==
The length of the shell attains 28 mm.

== Distribution ==
This marine species occurs in European waters and off West Africa.
