= Neoiphinoe kroeyeri =

Scientific classification
- Kingdom: Animalia
- Phylum: Mollusca
- Class: Gastropoda
- Subclass: Caenogastropoda
- Order: Littorinimorpha
- Family: Capulidae
- Genus: Neoiphinoe
- Species: N. kroeyeri

Binomial name
- Neoiphinoe kroeyeri (Philippi, 1849)

Synonyms
- Trichotropis kroeyeri Philippi 1849<

Species of gastropod

Neoiphinoe kroeyeri is a species of small sea snail, a marine gastropod mollusk in the family Capulidae, the cap snails.
