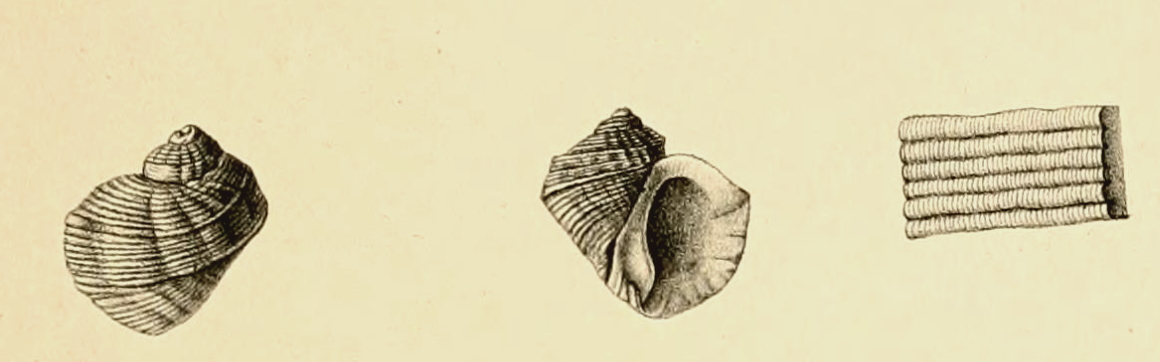
- Shell of Ariadnaria insignis (holotype)

Scientific classification
- Kingdom: Animalia
- Phylum: Mollusca
- Class: Gastropoda
- Subclass: Caenogastropoda
- Order: Littorinimorpha
- Family: Capulidae
- Genus: Ariadnaria
- Species: A. insignis

Binomial name
- Ariadnaria insignis (Middendorff, 1848)

Synonyms
- Ariadna insignis (Middendorff, 1848) superseded combination; Trichotropis (Ariadna) insignis Middendorff, 1848 superseded combination; Trichotropis insignis Middendorff, 1848 (original combination); Turritropis insignis (Middendorff, 1848) (a junior synonym)

= Ariadnaria insignis =

Species of gastropod

Ariadnaria insignis is a species of small sea snail, a marine gastropod mollusk in the family Capulidae, the cap snails.

== Description ==
The length of the shell attains 18.5 mm.

(Original description in Latin) The shell is ovately turreted and has a whitish color. Its whorls are densely and coarsely ridged with prominent, two elevated ridges that are sub-carinated and angular. The aperture is wide and angular at the ridges.

== Distribution ==
The species was found in the northern Sea of Japan, Sea of Okhotsk, Kuril Islands and the Bering Sea ant depths down to 100 m.
