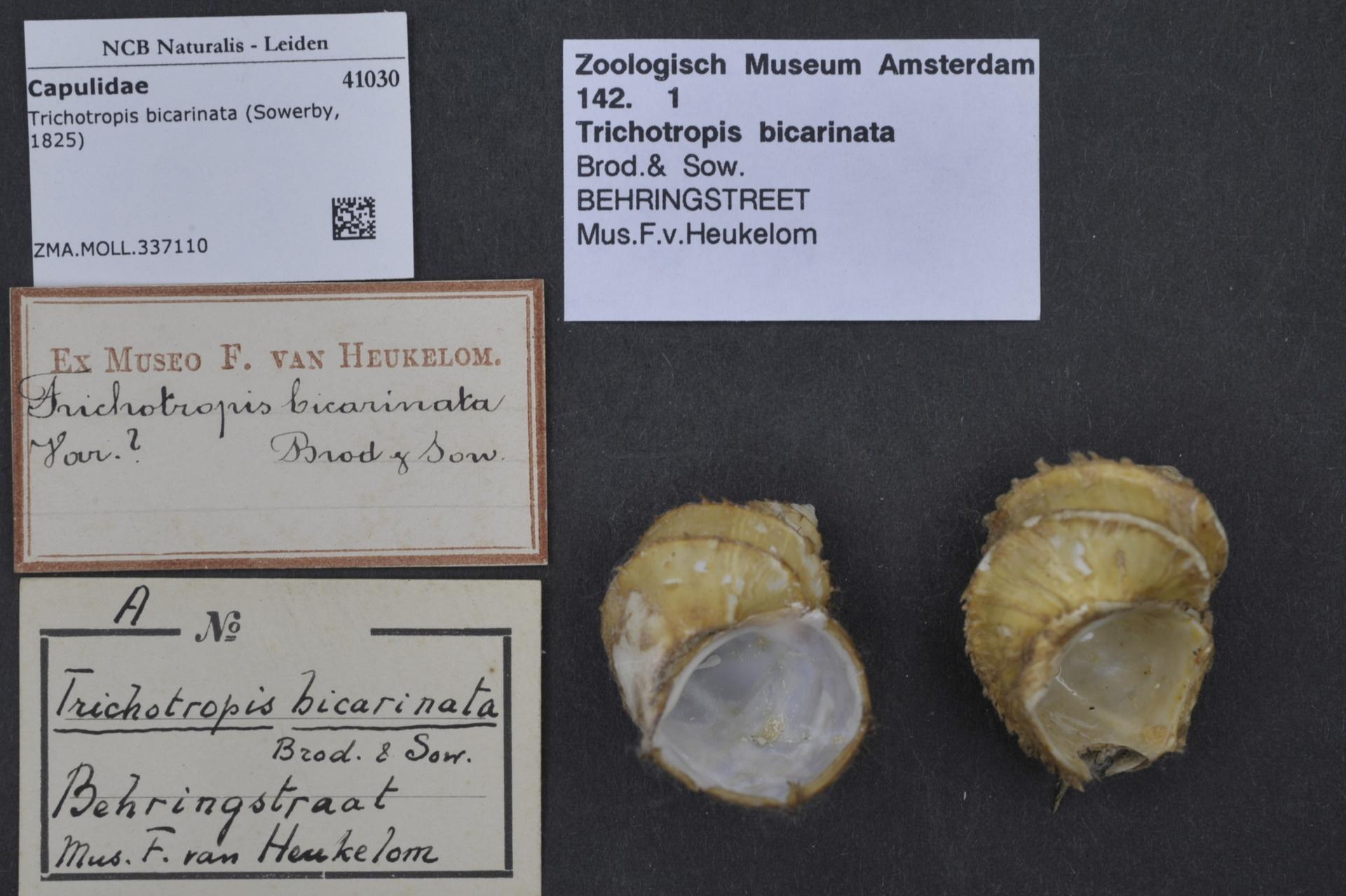
- Trichotropis bicarinata shell

Scientific classification
- Kingdom: Animalia
- Phylum: Mollusca
- Class: Gastropoda
- Subclass: Caenogastropoda
- Order: Littorinimorpha
- Family: Capulidae
- Genus: Trichotropis
- Species: T. bicarinata

Binomial name
- Trichotropis bicarinata (Sowerby I, 1825)

Synonyms
- Trichotropis bicarinatus

= Trichotropis bicarinata =

Species of gastropod

Trichotropis bicarinata is a species of small sea snail, a marine gastropod mollusc in the family Capulidae, the cap snails.

== Description ==
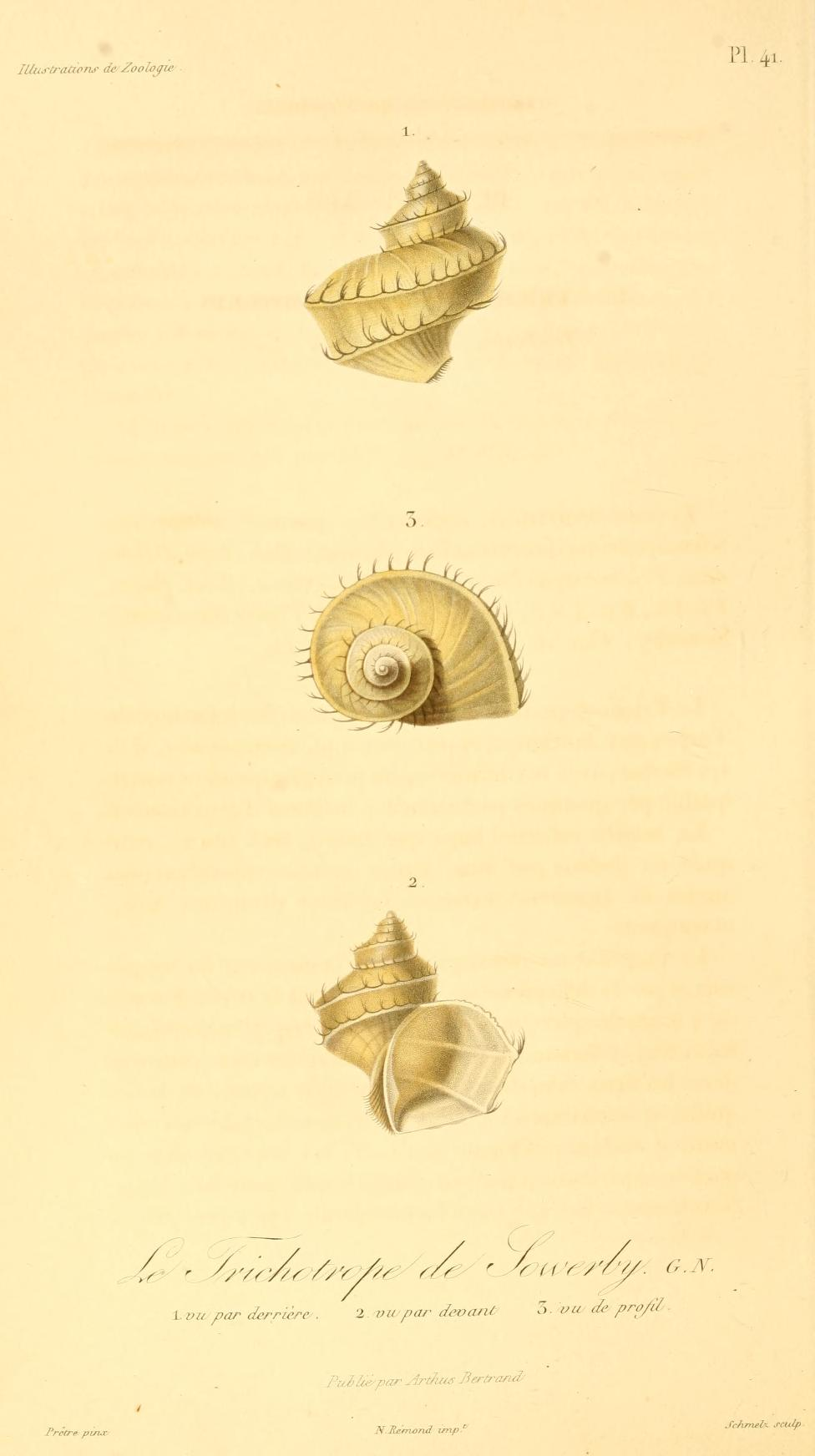
Trichotropis bicarinata shell drawing.

The maximum recorded shell length is 37 mm.

== Habitat ==
Minimum recorded depth is 10 m. Maximum recorded depth is 475 m.
