= Zelippistes benhami =

Scientific classification
- Kingdom: Animalia
- Phylum: Mollusca
- Class: Gastropoda
- Subclass: Caenogastropoda
- Order: Littorinimorpha
- Family: Capulidae
- Genus: Zelippistes
- Species: Z. benhami

Binomial name
- Zelippistes benhami (Suter, 1902)

Synonyms
- Lippistes benhami (Suter, 1902); Lippistes benhami var. perornatus Marshall & Murdoch, 1923; Separatista benhami Suter, 1902 (basionym); Zelippistes perornatus (Marshall & Murdoch, 1923)*

Species of gastropod

Zelippistes benhami is a species of sea snail, a marine gastropod mollusc in the family Capulidae, the cap snails.

== Distribution ==
This species is distributed along New Zealand.
