= Neoiphinoe =

Scientific classification
- Kingdom: Animalia
- Phylum: Mollusca
- Class: Gastropoda
- Subclass: Caenogastropoda
- Order: Littorinimorpha
- Family: Capulidae
- Genus: Neoiphinoe; Habe, 1978

Synonyms
- Iphinoe H. Adams & A. Adams, 1856 (non Rafinesque, 1815); Ovotropis Egorov & Alexeyev, 1998

Genus of gastropods

Neoiphinoe is a genus of small sea snails, marine gastropod mollusks in the family Capulidae, the cap snails.

== Species ==
Species within the genus Neoiphinoe include:

- Neoiphinoe arctica (Middendorff, 1849)
- Neoiphinoe coronata (Gould, 1860)
- Neoiphinoe echinata (Egorov & Alexeyev, 1998)
- Neoiphinoe kroeyeri (Philippi, 1849)
- Neoiphinoe ovoidea (Egorov & Alexeyev, 1998)
- Neoiphinoe permabilis (Dall, 1871)
- Neoiphinoe triseriata (Golikov, 1986)
