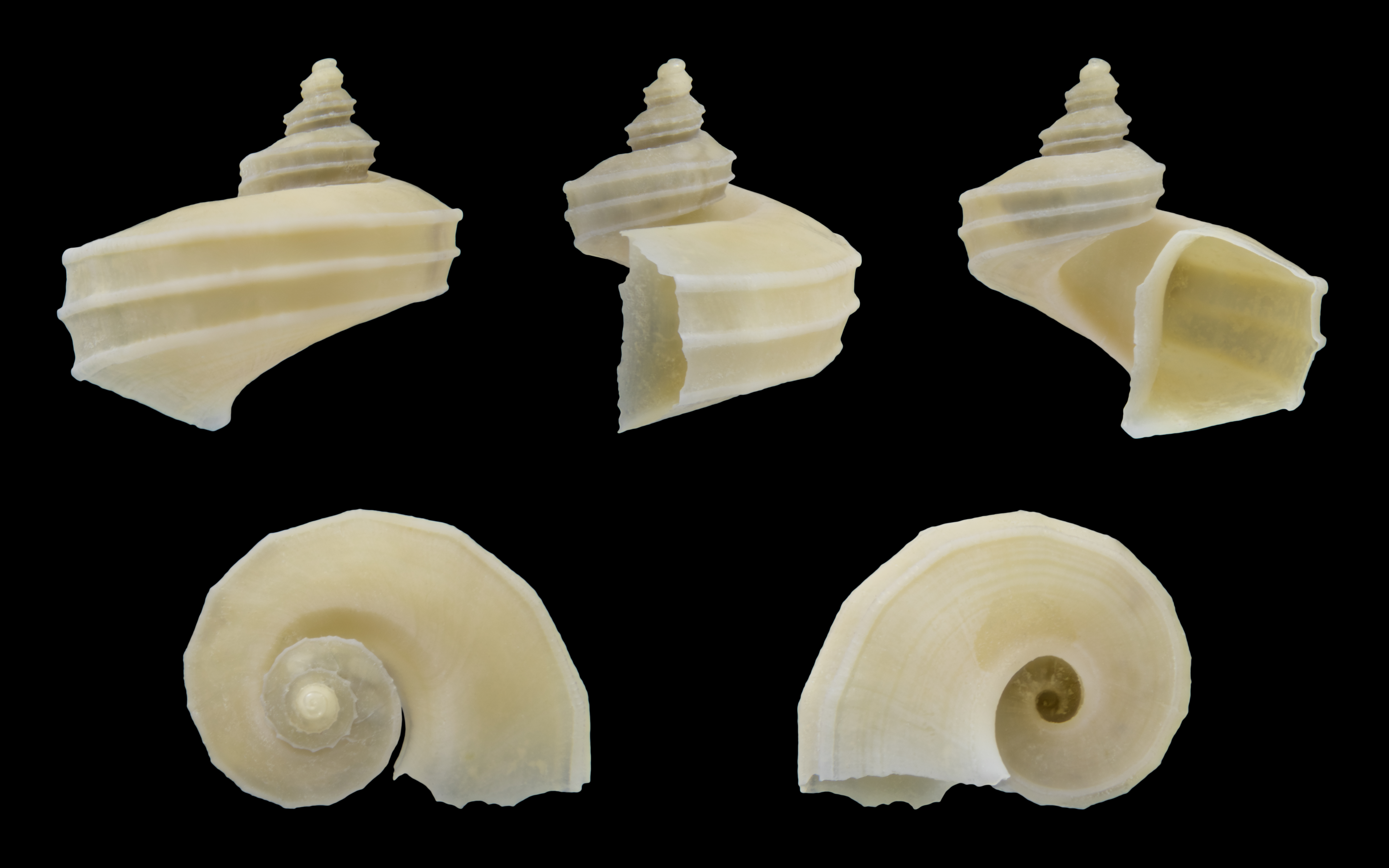

Scientific classification
- Kingdom: Animalia
- Phylum: Mollusca
- Class: Gastropoda
- Subclass: Caenogastropoda
- Order: Littorinimorpha
- Family: Capulidae
- Genus: Separatista
- Species: S. helicoides

Binomial name
- Separatista helicoides (Gmelin, 1791)

Synonyms
- Lippistes helicoides (Gmelin, 1791); Lippistes meridionalis Verco, 1906; Separatista chemnitzii (A. Adams, 1850); Separatista fraterna Iredale, 1936; Trichotropis blainvilleanus Petit de la Saussaye, 1851; Trichotropis gabrieli Pritchard & Gatliff, 1899; Trichotropis tricarinata Brazier, 1878; Turbo separatista Dillwyn, 1817; Zelippistes eccentricus Petuch, 1979

= Separatista helicoides =

Species of gastropod

Separatista helicoides is a species of sea snail, a marine gastropod mollusc in the family Capulidae.

== Distribution ==
This species can be found in the Indian Ocean off the Mascarene Basin. Queensland, Australia.
