= Trichosirius inornatus =

Scientific classification
- Kingdom: Animalia
- Phylum: Mollusca
- Class: Gastropoda
- Subclass: Caenogastropoda
- Order: Littorinimorpha
- Family: Capulidae
- Genus: Trichosirius
- Species: T. inornatus

Binomial name
- Trichosirius inornatus (Hutton, 1873)

Synonyms
- Trichosirius (Trichosirius) inornatus (Hutton, 1873)· accepted, alternate representation; Trichosirius inornatus chathamensis Finlay, 1928; Trichosirius clathrata Sower, 1874; Trichosirius inornata Hutton, 1873; Trichotropis clathrata G. B. Sowerby II, 1874

Species of gastropod

Trichosirius inornatus is a species of medium-sized sea snail, a marine gastropod mollusc in the family Capulidae, the cap snails.
