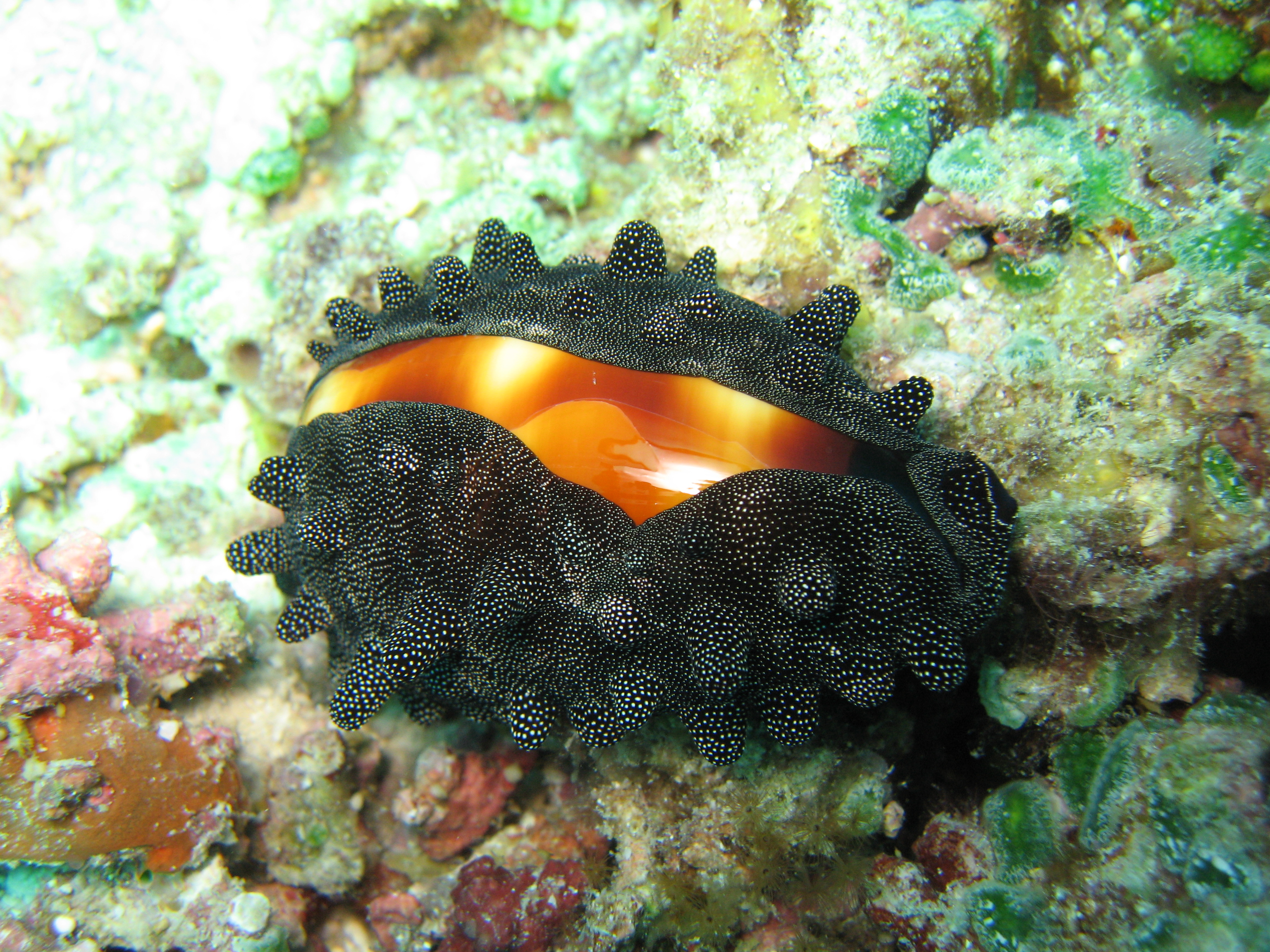
- A live Talparia talpa in situ with its mantle almost fully extended, anterior end towards the right
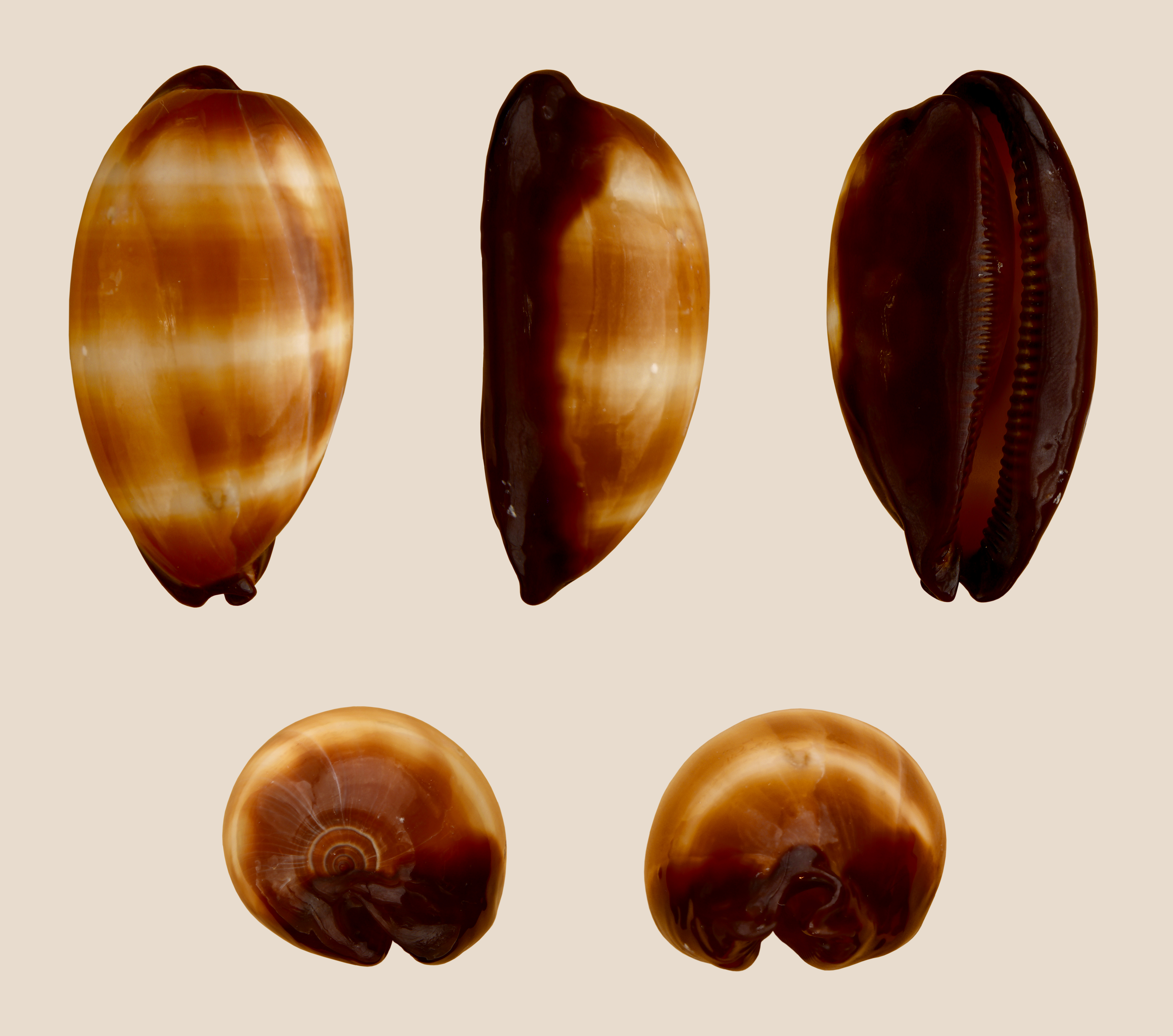
- Five views of a shell of Talaria talpa

Scientific classification
- Kingdom: Animalia
- Phylum: Mollusca
- Class: Gastropoda
- Subclass: Caenogastropoda
- Order: Littorinimorpha
- Superfamily: Cypraeoidea
- Family: Cypraeidae
- Genus: Talparia; Troschel, 1861

Type species
- Cypraea talpa Linnaeus, 1758

= Talparia =

Genus of gastropods

Talparia is a genus of sea snails, marine gastropod mollusks in the subfamily Luriinae of the family Cypraeidae, the cowries.

== Species ==
Species within the genus Talparia include:

- Talparia exusta (Sowerby, 1832)
- Talparia talpa (Linnaeus, 1758)

Synonyms

- Talparia argus (Linnaeus, 1758): synonym of Arestorides argus (Linnaeus, 1758)
- Talparia mariaelisabethae Dolin, 1991: synonym of † Lyncina mariaelisabethae (Dolin, 1991) (original combination)
