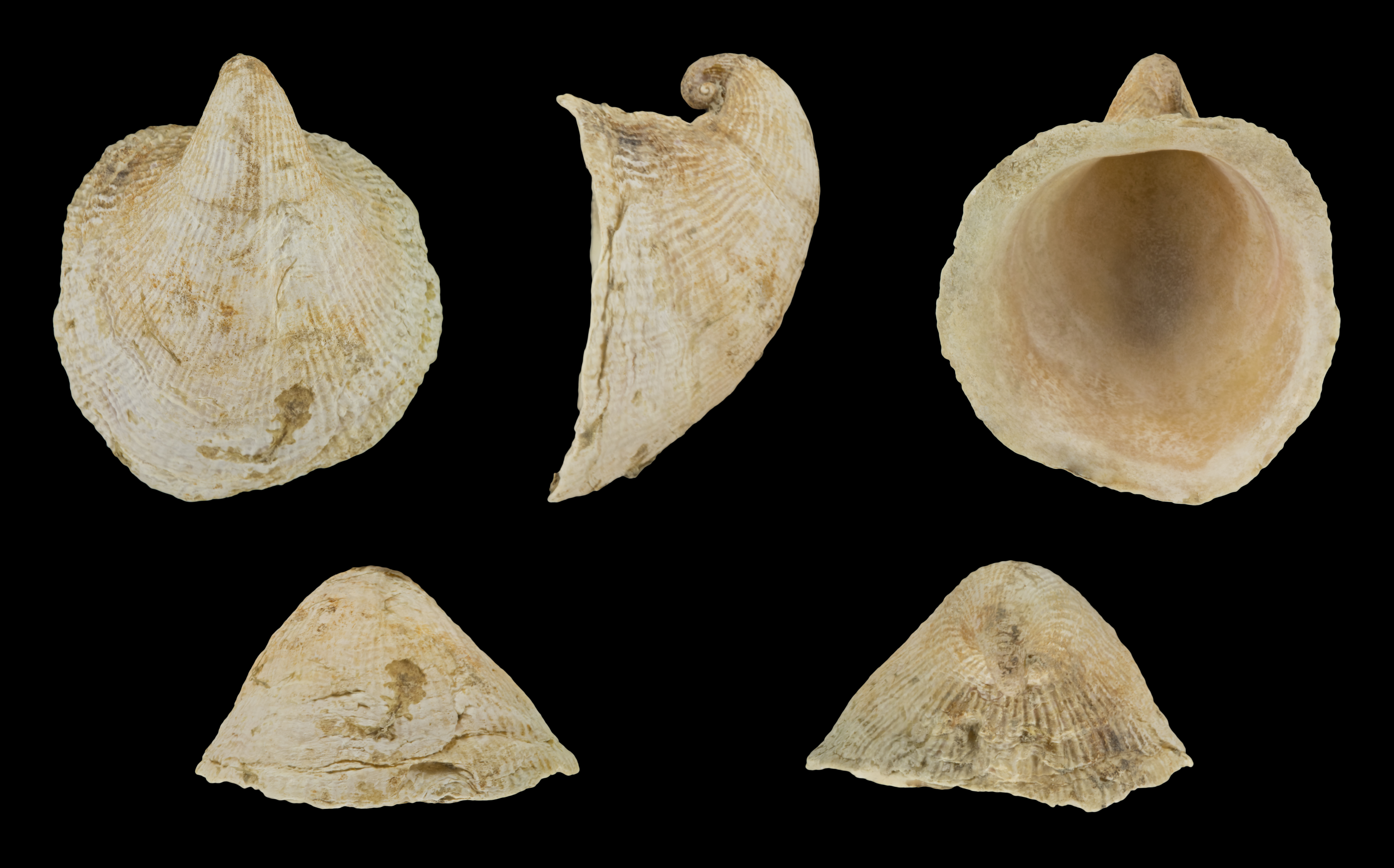
- Shell of Capulus ungaricus

Scientific classification
- Kingdom: Animalia
- Phylum: Mollusca
- Class: Gastropoda
- Subclass: Caenogastropoda
- Order: Littorinimorpha
- Family: Capulidae
- Genus: Capulus
- Species: C. ungaricus

Binomial name
- Capulus ungaricus (Linnaeus, 1758)

Synonyms
- Amalthea maxima Schumacher, 1817; Capulus hungaricus [sic] (misspelling of Capulus ungaricus (Linnaeus, 1758)); Capulus hungaricus thorsoni Nordsieck, 1969; Capulus militaris (Linnaeus, 1771); Patella militaris Linnaeus, 1771; Patella ungarica Linnaeus, 1758 (original combination); Protomedea ornata Costa O.G., 1861

= Capulus ungaricus =

Species of gastropod

Capulus ungaricus, common name the bonnet shell, is a species of medium-sized sea snail, a marine gastropod mollusk in the family Capulidae, the cap snails.

== Taxonomy ==
The original name of this species is Capulus ungaricus (Linnaeus, 1758). Later on, a few authors (e.g. Jeffreys, 1865, Thorson, 1941, Ziegelmeier, 1966, Lindner, 1977) changed the name erroneously in Capulus hungaricus. The correct date of publication is 1758 and not 1767 as Abbott (1974) and Lindner (1977) cited.

== Distribution ==
The distribution of Capulus ungaricus includes the sea off Greenland to off Florida. It is less common in the North Sea.

== Description ==
The maximum recorded shell length is 50 mm.

== Habitat ==
Minimum recorded depth is 1 m. Maximum recorded depth is 838 m. It is known also from seamounts and knolls.

== Feeding habits ==
It is a suspension feeder.
