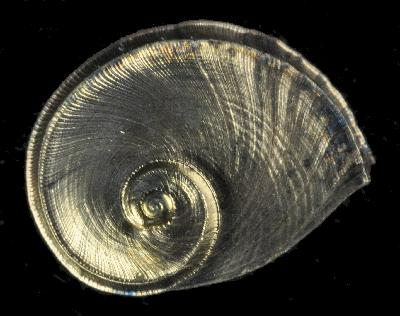
- Shell of Zygoceras tropidophorum

Scientific classification
- Kingdom: Animalia
- Phylum: Mollusca
- Class: Gastropoda
- Order: Stylommatophora
- Infraorder: Limacoidei
- Superfamily: Gastrodontoidea
- Family: Gastrodontidae
- Genus: Zonitoides; Warén & Bouchet, 1991

Type species
- Zygoceras tropidophorum Warén & Bouchet, 1991

= Zygoceras =

Genus of gastropods

Zygoceras is a genus of sea snail, a cowry, a marine gastropod mollusk in the family Haloceratidae.

== Species ==
- Zygoceras aqabaense Bandel, 2007
- Zygoceras biocalae Warén & Bouchet, 1991
- Zygoceras okutanii Poppe & Tagaro, 2010
- Zygoceras tropidophorum Warén & Bouchet, 1991

Synonyms

- Zygoceras aqabaensis Bandel, 2007: synonym of Zygoceras aqabaense Bandel, 2007 (incorrect gender agreement of specific epithet)
- Zygoceras tropidophora Warén & Bouchet, 1991: synonym of Zygoceras tropidophorum Warén & Bouchet, 1991 (incorrect gender agreement of specific epithet)
