= Zelippistes =

Scientific classification
- Kingdom: Animalia
- Phylum: Mollusca
- Class: Gastropoda
- Subclass: Caenogastropoda
- Order: Littorinimorpha
- Family: Capulidae
- Genus: Zelippistes; Finlay, 1927

Species
- See text

Genus of gastropods

Zelippistes is a genus of small sea snails, marine gastropod molluscs in the family Capulidae, the cap snails. This genus was previously placed in the family Trichotropidae.

== Species ==
Species within the genus Zelippistes include:

- Zelippistes benhami (Suter, 1902)
- Zelippistes excentricus Petuch, 1979
