= Torellia antarctica =

Scientific classification
- Kingdom: Animalia
- Phylum: Mollusca
- Class: Gastropoda
- Subclass: Caenogastropoda
- Order: Littorinimorpha
- Family: Capulidae
- Genus: Torellia
- Species: T. antarctica

Binomial name
- Torellia antarctica (Thiele, 1912)

Synonyms
- Antitrichotropis antarctica (Thiele, 1912); Trichotropis antarctica Thiele, 1912

Species of gastropod

Torellia antarctica is a species of small sea snail, a marine gastropod mollusk in the family Capulidae, the cap snails.

== Description ==
The maximum recorded shell length is 4.6 mm.

== Habitat ==
Minimum recorded depth is 300 m. Maximum recorded depth is 300 m.
