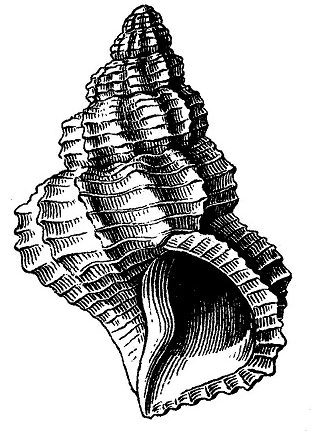
- Original image of a shell of Verticosta migrans

Scientific classification
- Kingdom: Animalia
- Phylum: Mollusca
- Class: Gastropoda
- Subclass: Caenogastropoda
- Order: Littorinimorpha
- Family: Capulidae
- Genus: Verticosta
- Species: V. migrans

Binomial name
- Verticosta migrans (Dall, 1881)

Synonyms
- Trichotropis migrans Dall, 1881

= Verticosta migrans =

Species of gastropod

Verticosta migrans is a species of small sea snail, a marine gastropod mollusc in the family Capulidae, the cap snails.

== Description ==
The maximum recorded shell length is 10 mm.

== Habitat ==
Minimum recorded depth is 65 m. Maximum recorded depth is 366 m.
