= Separatista flavida =

Scientific classification
- Kingdom: Animalia
- Phylum: Mollusca
- Class: Gastropoda
- Subclass: Caenogastropoda
- Order: Littorinimorpha
- Family: Capulidae
- Genus: Separatista
- Species: S. flavida

Binomial name
- Separatista flavida (Hinds, 1843)

Synonyms
- Separatista gracilenta (Brazier, 1878); Trichotropis flavida Hinds, 1843 (basionym); Trichotropis gracilenta Brazier, 1877

Species of gastropod

Separatista flavida is a species of sea snail, a marine gastropod mollusc in the family Capulidae.

== Distribution ==
This marine species occurs off the Philippines.
