= Talparia exusta =

Scientific classification
- Kingdom: Animalia
- Phylum: Mollusca
- Class: Gastropoda
- Subclass: Caenogastropoda
- Order: Littorinimorpha
- Family: Cypraeidae
- Genus: Talparia
- Species: T. exusta

Binomial name
- Talparia exusta (Sowerby, 1832)

Synonyms
- Cypraea exusta Sowerby, 1832

Species of gastropod

Talparia exusta is a species of sea snail, a cowry, a marine gastropod mollusk in the family Cypraeidae, the cowries.

== Distribution ==
This species is distributed in the Red Sea and along Eritrea and Somalia.
