= Ariadnaria hirsuta =

Scientific classification
- Kingdom: Animalia
- Phylum: Mollusca
- Class: Gastropoda
- Subclass: Caenogastropoda
- Order: Littorinimorpha
- Family: Capulidae
- Genus: Ariadnaria
- Species: A. hirsuta

Binomial name
- Ariadnaria hirsuta (A. N. Golikov & Gulbin, 1978)

Synonyms
- Trichotropis hirsutus A. N. Golikov & Gulbin, 1978 (original combination)

Species of gastropod

Ariadnaria hirsuta is a species of small sea snail, a marine gastropod mollusk in the family Capulidae, the cap snails.

== Description ==
The length of the shell attains 9.7 mm.

== Distribution ==
The holotype was found in the Sea of Okhotsk and in the Middle Kuril Islands a depths between 5 m and 285 m.
