= Torellia planispira =

Scientific classification
- Kingdom: Animalia
- Phylum: Mollusca
- Class: Gastropoda
- Subclass: Caenogastropoda
- Order: Littorinimorpha
- Family: Capulidae
- Genus: Torellia
- Species: T. planispira

Binomial name
- Torellia planispira (Smith, 1915)

Synonyms
- Trichotropis planispira E. A. Smith, 1915

Species of gastropod

Torellia planispira is a species of small sea snail, a marine gastropod mollusk in the family Capulidae, the cap snails.

== Description ==
The maximum recorded shell length is 15 mm.

== Habitat ==
Minimum recorded depth is 412 m. Maximum recorded depth is 412 m.
