= Hyalorisia galea =

Scientific classification
- Kingdom: Animalia
- Phylum: Mollusca
- Class: Gastropoda
- Subclass: Caenogastropoda
- Order: Littorinimorpha
- Family: Capulidae
- Genus: Hyalorisia
- Species: H. galea

Binomial name
- Hyalorisia galea (Dall, 1889)

Species of gastropod

Hyalorisia galea is a species of small sea snail, a marine gastropod mollusc in the family Capulidae, the cap snails.

== Description ==
The maximum recorded shell length is 18.5 mm.

== Habitat ==
Minimum recorded depth is 342 m. Maximum recorded depth is 768 m.
