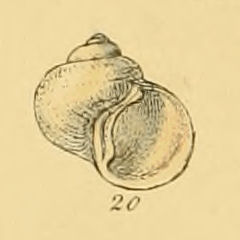
- Torellia delicata shell

Scientific classification
- Kingdom: Animalia
- Phylum: Mollusca
- Class: Gastropoda
- Subclass: Caenogastropoda
- Order: Littorinimorpha
- Family: Capulidae
- Genus: Torellia; Lovén in Jeffreys, 1867

Synonyms
- List: Antitrichotropis Powell, 1951; Neoconcha E. A. Smith, 1907; Torellia (Neoconcha) E. A. Smith, 1907; Trachysma G. O. Sars, 1878; Trichoconcha E. A. Smith, 1907

= Torellia =

Genus of gastropods

Torellia is a genus of small sea snails, marine gastropod mollusks in the family Capulidae, the cap snails.

== Species ==
The following species are recognised in the genus Torellia:

- Torellia acuta Golikov & Gulbin, 1978
- Torellia angulifera Warén, Arnaud & Cantera, 1986
- Torellia antarctica (Thiele, 1912)
- Torellia cornea Powell, 1951
- Torellia delicata (R. A. Philippi, 1844)
- Torellia didyma Bouchet & Warén, 1993
- Torellia exilis (Powell, 1958)
- Torellia insignis (E. A. Smith, 1915)
- Torellia lanata Warén, Arnaud & Cantera, 1986
- Torellia loyaute S.-I Huang & M.-H. Lin, 2021
- Torellia mirabilis (E. A. Smith, 1907)
- Torellia pacifica Okutani, 1980
- Torellia planispira (E. A. Smith, 1915)
- Torellia smithi Warén, Arnaud & Cantera, 1986
- Torellia vallonia Dall, 1919
