= Trichosirius =

Scientific classification
- Kingdom: Animalia
- Phylum: Mollusca
- Class: Gastropoda
- Subclass: Caenogastropoda
- Order: Littorinimorpha
- Family: Capulidae
- Genus: Trichosirius; Finlay, 1926

Type species
- Trichotropis inornata Hutton, 1873

Species
- See text

Synonyms
- † Trichosirius (Eosirius) Maxwell, 1966· accepted, alternate representation; Trichosirius (Miplioderma) Laws, 1940 · accepted, alternate representation; Trichosirius (Trichosirius) Finlay, 1926 · accepted, alternate representation

Genus of gastropods

Trichosirius is a genus of small sea snails, marine gastropod molluscs in the family Capulidae (previously Trichotropidae).

== Species ==
Species within the genus Trichosirius include:

- Trichosirius cavatocarinatus (Laws, 1940)
- Trichosirius inornatus (Hutton, 1873)
- Trichosirius octocarinatus (Powell, 1931)
- Trichosirius ornatus (Hutton, 1873)
- † Trichosirius (Eosirius) admeteformis (Maxwell, 1966)
- † Trichosirius (Miplioderma) finlayi Laws, 1935
- † Trichosirius (Miplioderma) mangawera (Laws, 1940)
- † Trichosirius (Miplioderma) reticulatus (Suter, 1917)
- † Trichosirius (Miplioderma) waihuanus (Marwick, 1965)
