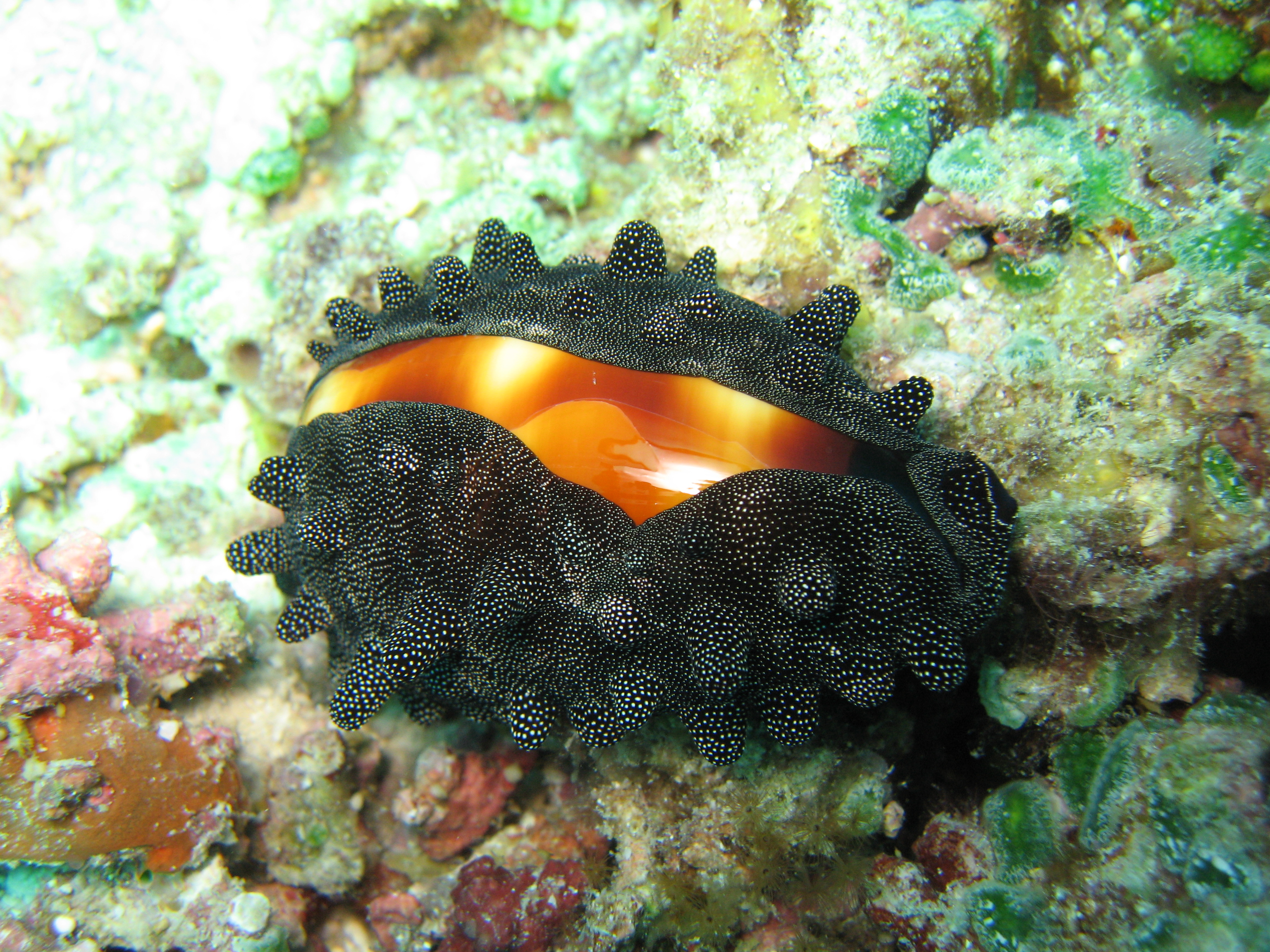
- A live Talparia talpa in situ with its mantle almost fully extended, anterior end towards the right
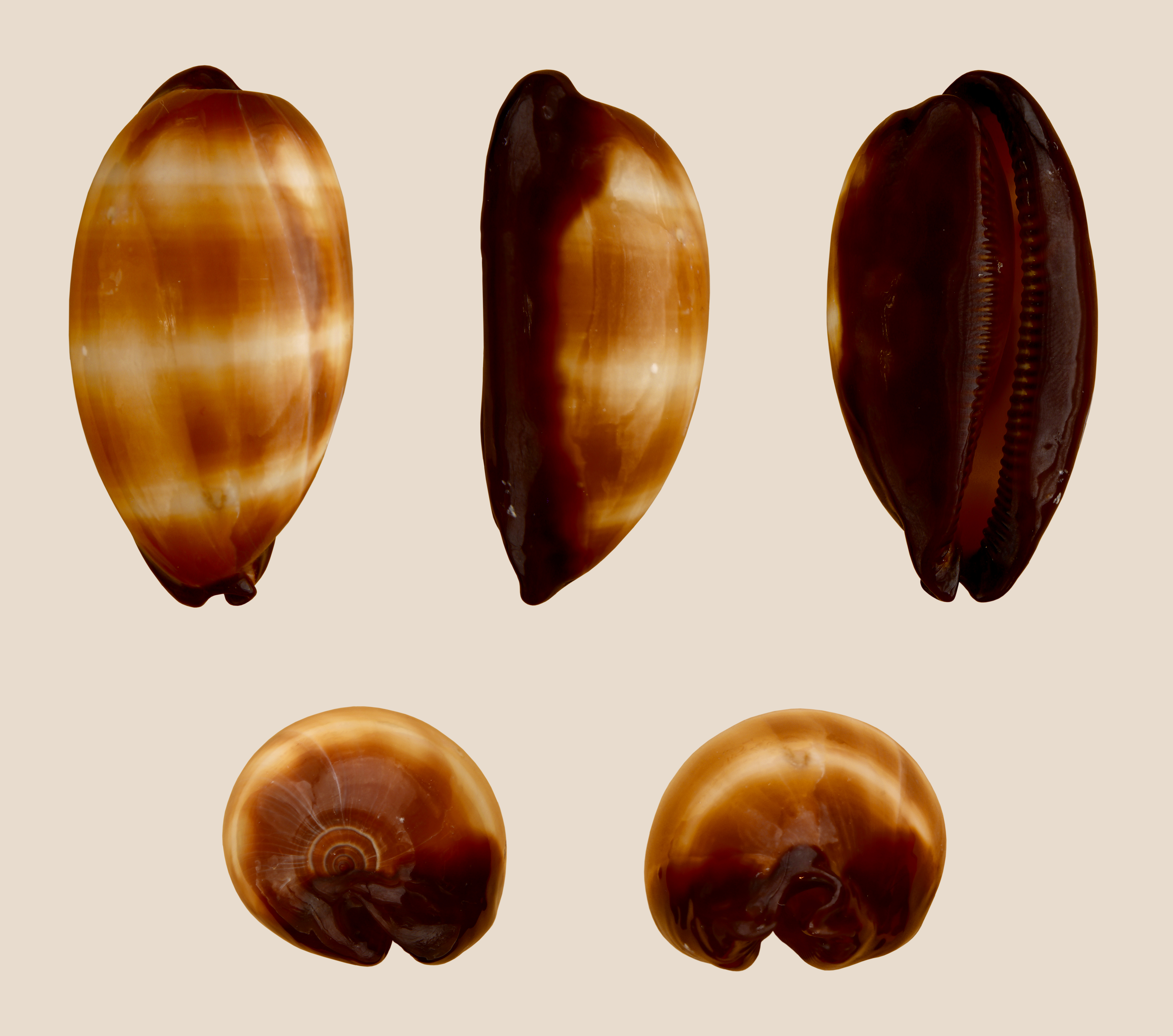
- Five views of a shell of Talaria talpa

Scientific classification
- Kingdom: Animalia
- Phylum: Mollusca
- Class: Gastropoda
- Subclass: Caenogastropoda
- Order: Littorinimorpha
- Family: Cypraeidae
- Genus: Talparia
- Species: T. talpa

Binomial name
- Talparia talpa (Linnaeus, 1758)
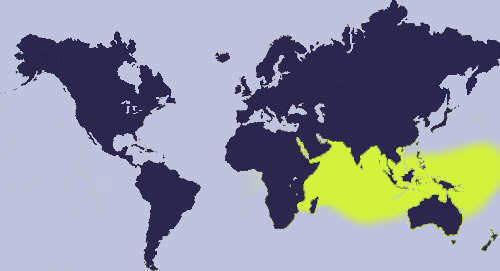
- Distribution map of Talparia talpa

Synonyms
- Cypraea talpa Linnaeus, 1758(basionym); Cypraea talpa imperialis (Schilder & Schilder, 1938); Cypraea talpa var. saturata Duatzenberg, 1903; Talparia talpa imperialis (Schilder & Schilder, 1938); Talparia talpa var. lewallorum Lorenz, 2015 (unavailable name: infrasubspecific rank)

= Talparia talpa =

Species of gastropod

Talparia talpa, common name the mole cowry or chocolate banded cowry, is a species of sea snail, a cowry, a marine gastropod mollusk in the family Cypraeidae, the cowries.

== Subspecies ==
- Talparia talpa lutani Bridges, 2015
- Talparia talpa talpa (Linnaeus, 1758)

Synonyms

- Talparia talpa imperialis Schilder, F.A. & M. Schilder, 1938: synonym of Talparia talpa (Linnaeus, 1758)
- Talparia talpa var. lewallorum Lorenz, 2015: synonym of Talparia talpa (Linnaeus, 1758) (unavailable name: infrasubspecific rank)
- Talparia talpa saturata (Dautzenberg, Ph., 1903): synonym of Talparia talpa (Linnaeus, 1758)

== Description ==
The shells of these quite uncommon cowries reach on average 50–70 millimetres (2.0–2.8 in) of length, with a minimum size of 23 millimetres (0.91 in) and a maximum size of 105 millimetres (4.1 in). They are very variable in pattern and colour. The dorsum surface is smooth and shiny, the basic color is brown or yellowish brown, with three or four yellow or light brown transversal bands. The margins, the base and the teeth are completely dark brown or black. Also the teeth are dark brown, but the teeth spacing is clearer or white. In the living cowries the mantle is greyish or black, with long cylindrical papillae. Mantle and foot are well developed, with external antennae. The lateral flaps of the mantle may hide completely the shell surface and may be quickly retracted into the shell.

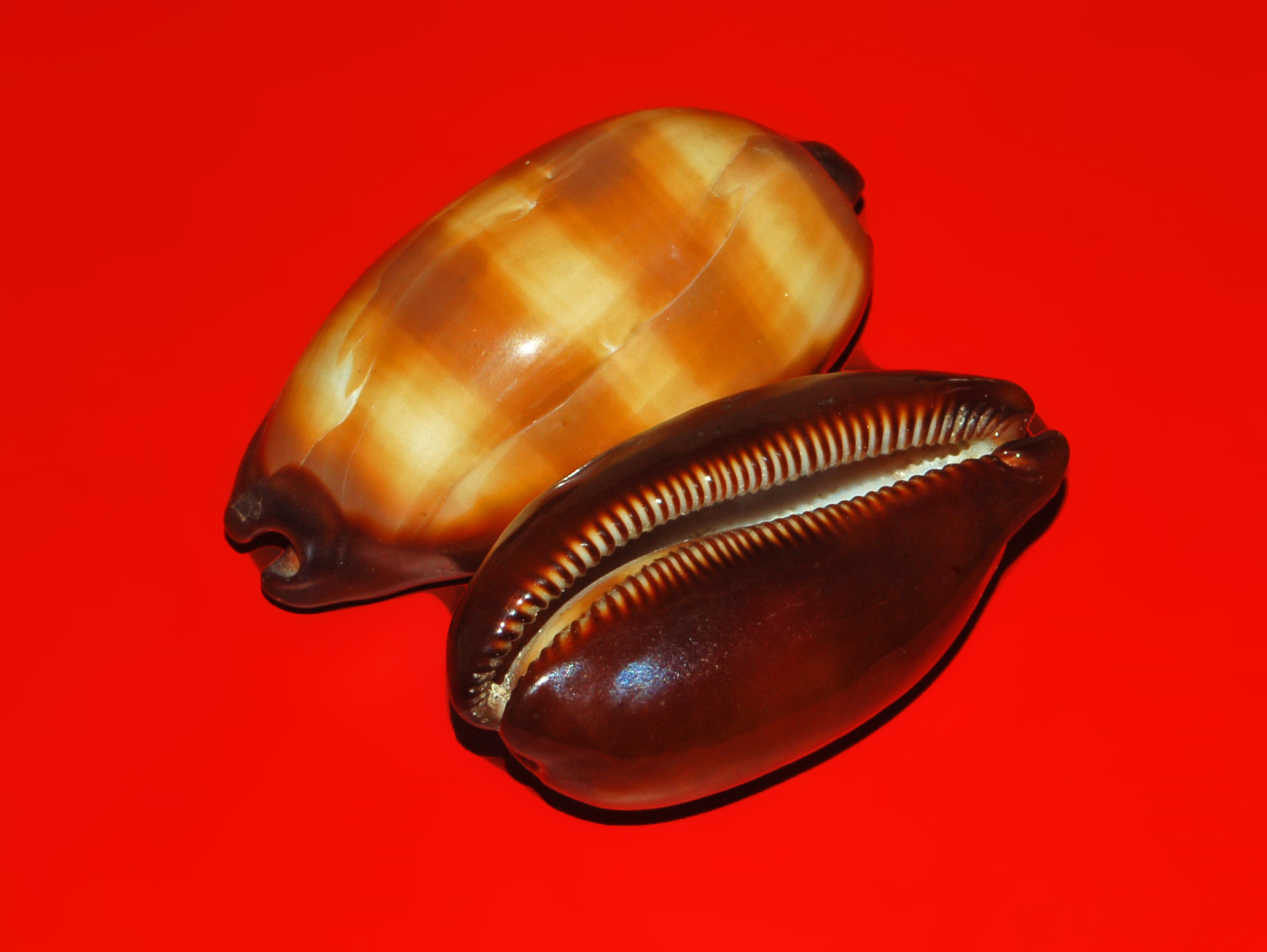
Two shells of Talparia talpa, dorsal and apertural view

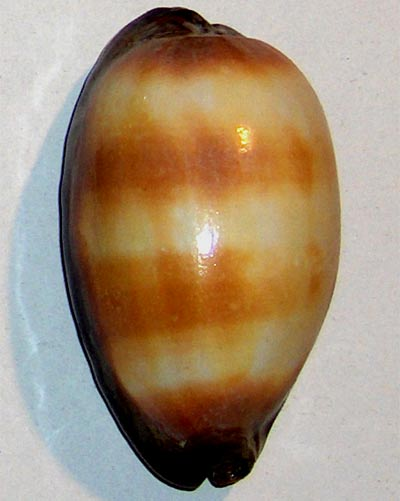
A shell of Talparia talpa, anterior end towards the bottom

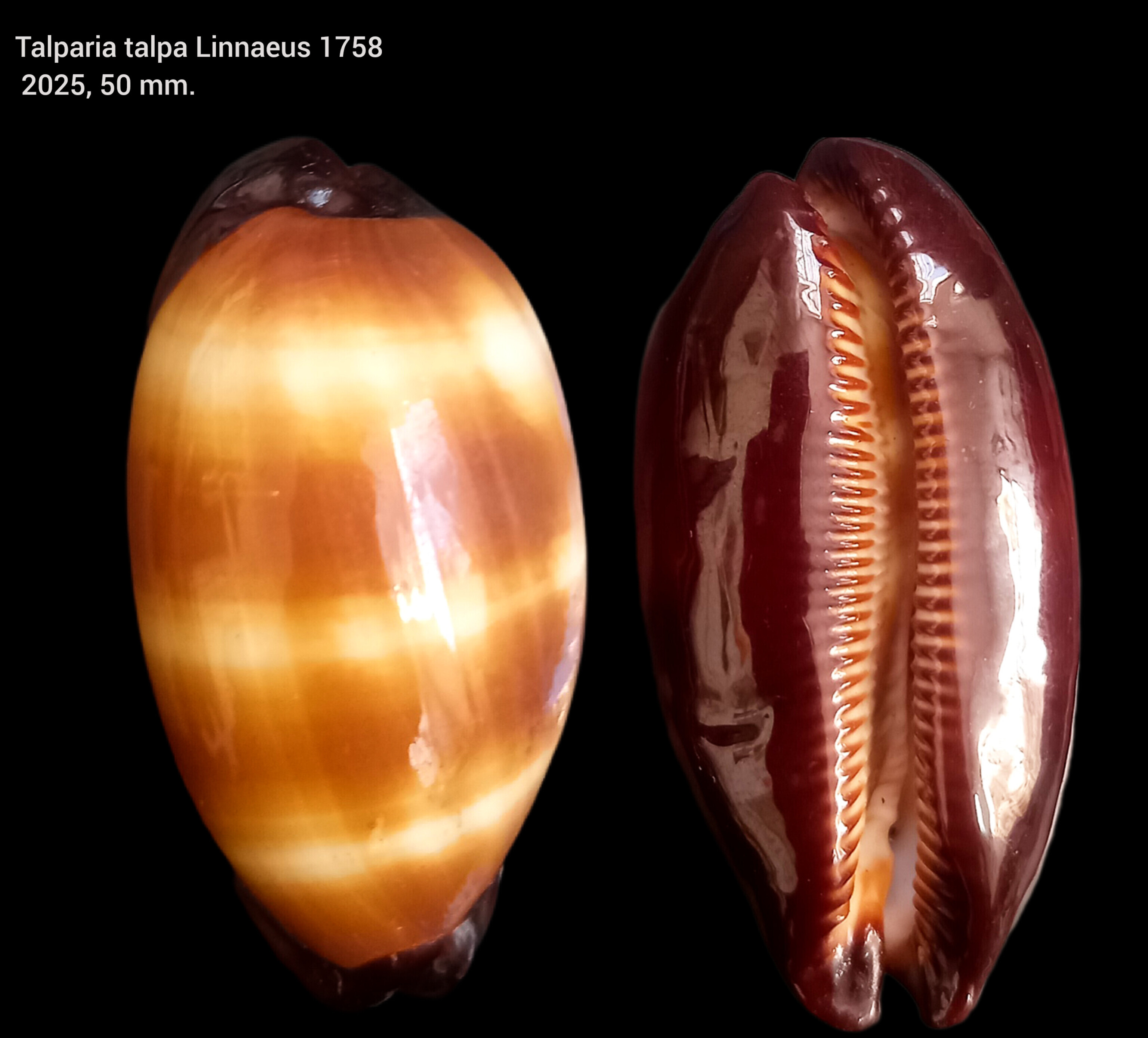
Talparia talpa Linnaeus 1758 2025, 50 mm.

== Distribution ==
This species occurs in the Red Sea and in the Indian Ocean along East Africa (Aldabra, Chagos, the Comores, Eritrea, Kenya, Madagascar, the Mascarene Basin, Mauritius, Mozambique, Réunion, the Seychelles, Somalia and Tanzania), in the western Pacific (western Australia, Philippines), in Polynesia and Hawaii.

Fossils of this species have been found in Pliocene or Pleistocene strata on Guam.

== Habitat ==
These cowries live on coral reef or in shallow lagoons in tropical intertidal and subtidal waters up to 30 m depth. They can be found under ledges and in small coral caves at night, as they start feeding at dusk.
