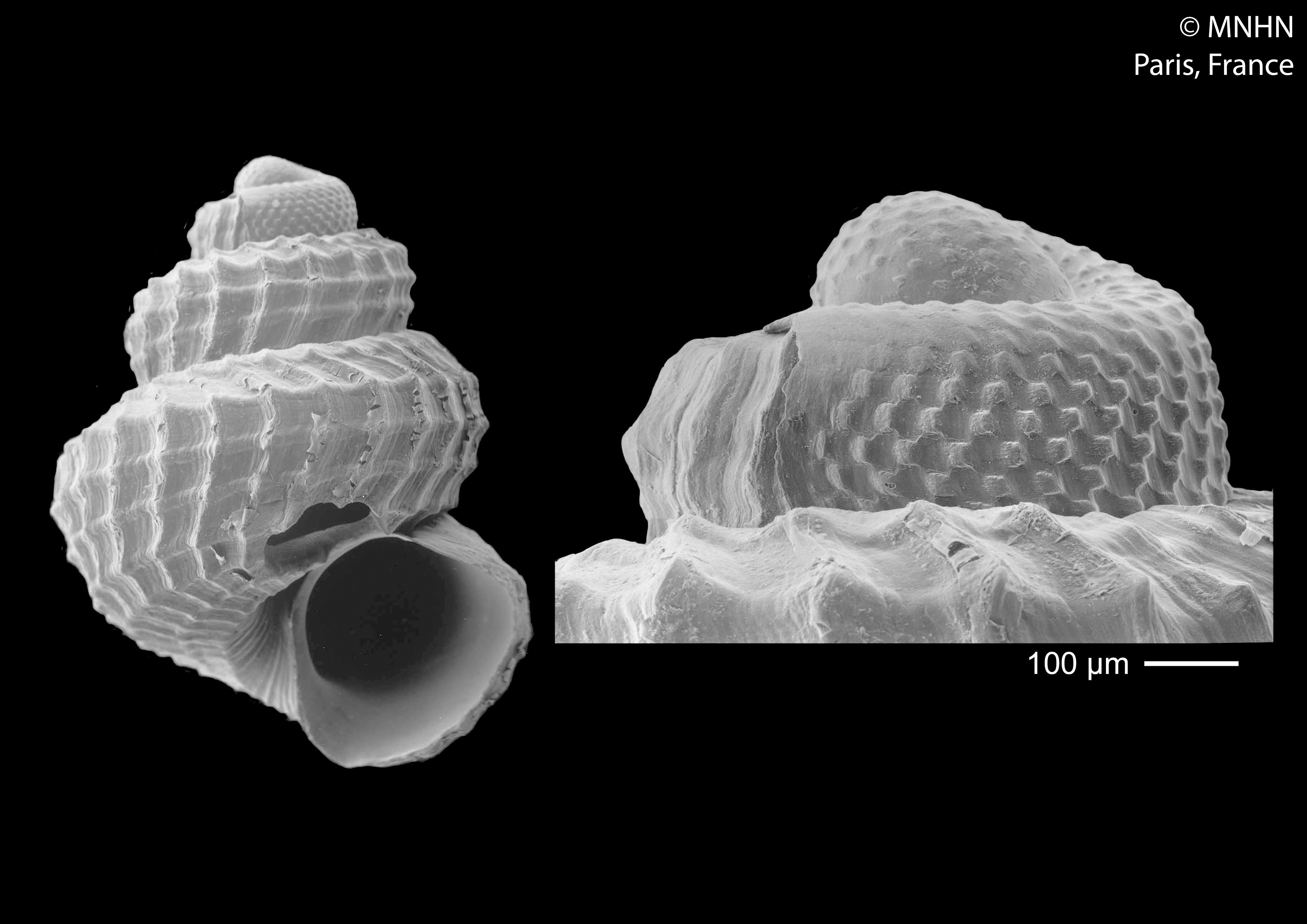
- Haloceras meteoricum

Scientific classification
- Kingdom: Animalia
- Phylum: Mollusca
- Class: Gastropoda
- Subclass: Caenogastropoda
- Order: Littorinimorpha
- Superfamily: Capuloidea
- Family: Haloceratidae; A. Warén & Bouchet, 1991

Genera
- See text

= Haloceratidae =

Family of gastropods

Haloceratidae is a family of sea snails, marine gastropod molluscs in the superfamily Capuloidea.

== Genera ==
Genera within the family Haloceratidae include:

- Haloceras Dall, 1889
- Zygoceras Warén & Bouchet, 1991
