= Capuloidea =

Scientific classification
- Kingdom: Animalia
- Phylum: Mollusca
- Class: Gastropoda
- Subclass: Caenogastropoda
- Order: Littorinimorpha
- Superfamily: Capuloidea

Families
- Capulidae; Haloceratidae

Capuloidea is a superfamily of sea snails in the clade Latrogastropoda. It consists of the families Capulidae and Haloceratidae.
