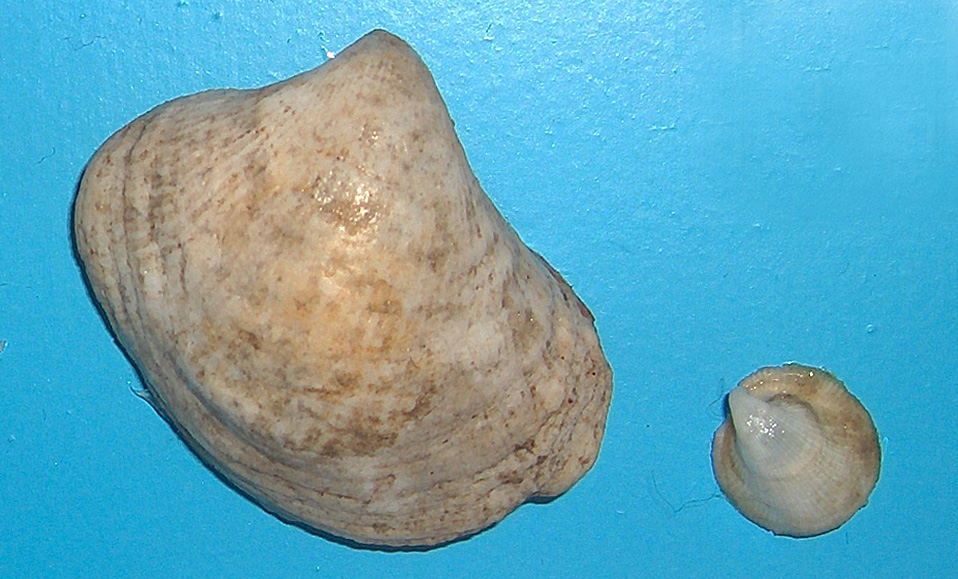
- Two shells of Capulus ungaricus with the periostracum removed

Scientific classification
- Kingdom: Animalia
- Phylum: Mollusca
- Class: Gastropoda
- Subclass: Caenogastropoda
- Order: Littorinimorpha
- Superfamily: Capuloidea
- Family: Capulidae; Fleming, 1822

Genera
- See text

Synonyms
- Trichotropidae Gray, 1850; Verenidae Gray, 1857 (inv.); Pileopsidae Chenu, 1859; Lippistidae Iredale, 1924; Siriidae Iredale, 1931; Cerithhiodermatidae Hacobjan, 1976

= Capulidae =

Family of gastropods

The Capulidae, the cap snails or cap shells, are a taxonomic family of limpet-like sea snails, marine gastropod molluscs.

Capulidae is the only family in the superfamily Capuloidea. Capulidae is assigned to the paraphyletic order Littorinimorpha, but is more closely related to neogastropods than some other littorinimorphs as it is a member of the clade Latrogastropoda.

The name Trichotropidae was previously used for this family, but this name is invalid, as it is a junior synonym.

== Characteristics ==
(Original description; described as Capulusidae) The foot is complicated on its anterior margin. The shell adheres to the animal by a circular muscle, leaving an opening in front for the issue of the head and the entrance to the branchial cavity. The gills form a single ridge across the roof. The aperture is in the form of an extended proboscis, with a deep groove above. The tentacula, which are two in number, have the eyes at their external base. The anus is on the right side of the branchial cavity.

Cup-shaped or bonnet-like, the shells of this family start with flat, tightly coiled initial whorls. From this beginning, they expand rapidly in a planospiral way, flaring out dramatically like a funnel.

The interior of the shell is porcelaneous. Some forms develop internal partitions or septa, a feature that makes them superficially resemble the Calyptraeidae (slipper limpets). Externally, the shell is covered by a thick periostracum that feels either felt-like or hairy. There is no operculum.

Species in this family are parasites, praying mostly on other molluscs. They steal the food from these animals with a long proboscis.

== Genera ==
Genera within the family Capulidae include:

Subfamily Capulinae J. Fleming, 1822

- Ariadnaria Habe, 1961
- † Armenostoma Hacobjan, 1976
- † Blackdownia Kollmann, 1976
- Capulus Montfort, 1810
- Cerithioderma Conrad, 1860 (?)
- Ciliatotropis Golikov, 1986
- Cryocapulus Schiaparelli, Bouchet, Fassio & Oliverio, 2020
- Discotrichoconcha Powell, 1951
- Echinospira Girotti, 1970
- Hyalorisia Dall, 1889
- Icuncula Iredale, 1924
- Krebsia Montfort, 1810 : synonym of Capulus Montfort, 1810
- Latticosta S.-I Huang & M.-H. Lin, 2021
- Lippistes Montfort, 1810 (?)
- Neoiphinoe Habe, 1978
- Malluvium Melvill, 1906 : belongs to the family Hipponicidae.
- † Profusinus Bandel, 2000
- Rufodardanula Ponder, 1965; synonym of Skenella Pfeffer, 1886
- Separatista Gray, 1847
- Sirius Hedley, 1900
- † Tintorium Sohl, 1961
- Torellia Lovén in Jeffreys, 1867
- Trichamathina Habe, 1962
- Trichosirius Finlay, 1926 (?)
- Trichotropis Broderip and G. B. Sowerby I, 1829
- † Turbinopsis Conrad, 1860
- Turritropis Habe, 1961
- † Vermeijia Amano, 2019
- Verticosta S.-I Huang & M.-H. Lin, 2020
- † Xuwenospira H.-J. Wang, 1982
- Zelippistes Finlay, 1927

Subfamily † Lysinae Saul & Squires, 2008

- † Garzasia Saul & Squires, 2008
- † Lysis Gabb, 1864
- † Spirogalerus H. J. Finlay & Marwick, 1937

Genera brought into synonymy

- Actita Fischer von Waldheim, 1823: synonym of Capulus Montfort, 1810
- Antitrichotropis Powell, 1951: synonym of Torellia Jeffreys, 1867
- Ariadna P. Fischer, 1864: synonym of Ariadnaria T. Habe, 1961 (junior homonym, junior homonym of Ariadna Audouin, 1826 [Arachnida]; Ariadnaria is a replacement name)
- Brocchia Bronn, 1828: synonym of Capulus Montfort, 1810
- Capulonix Iredale, 1929: synonym of Capulus Montfort, 1810
- Dolichosirius Iredale, 1931: synonym of Sirius Hedley, 1900 (junior subjective synonym)
- † Eosirius P. A. Maxwell, 1966: synonym of † Trichosirius (Eosirius) P. A. Maxwell, 1966 represented as Trichosirius H. J. Finlay, 1926
- Iphinoe H. Adams & A. Adams, 1856 : synonym of Neoiphinoe Habe, 1978
- † Mesostoma Deshayes, 1861: synonym of † Cerithioderma Conrad, 1860 (junior subjective synonym, invalid: junior homonym of Mesostoma Ehrenberg, 1836)
- Neoconcha E.A. Smith, 1907: synonym of Torellia (Neoconcha) E.A. Smith, 1907
- Opposirius Iredale, 1931: synonym of Sirius Hedley, 1900
- Ovotropis Egorov & Alexeyev, 1998: synonym of Neoiphinoe Habe, 1978
- Pileopsis Lamarck, 1822: synonym of Capulus Montfort, 1810
- Opposirius Iredale, 1931: synonym of Sirius Hedley, 1900
- Trichoconcha E.A. Smith, 1907: synonym of Torellia Jeffreys, 1867
- † Tropidothais L. R. Cox, 1925: synonym of † Lysis Gabb, 1864 (junior subjective synonym)
