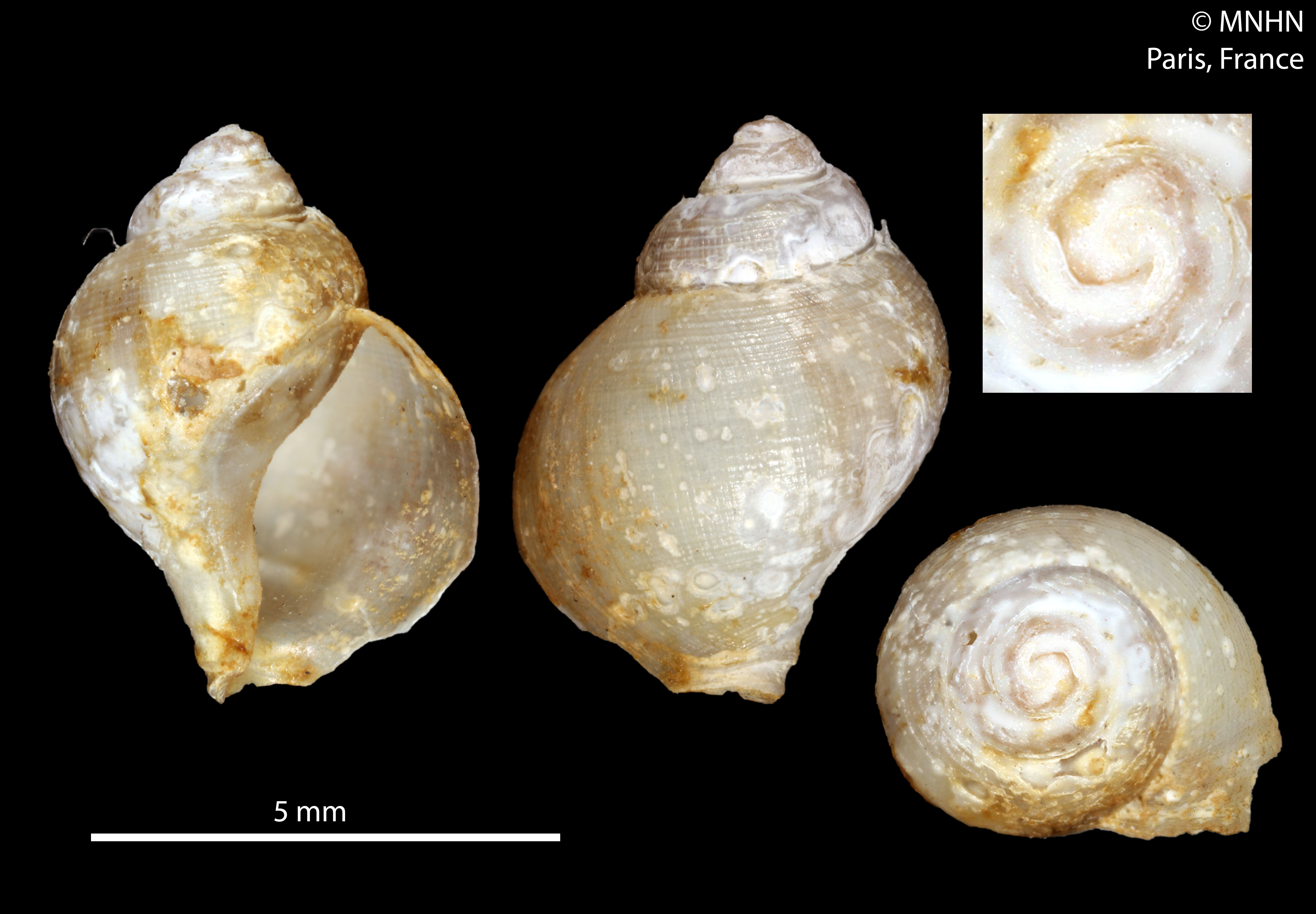
- Buccinum chinoi

Scientific classification
- Kingdom: Animalia
- Phylum: Mollusca
- Class: Gastropoda
- Subclass: Caenogastropoda
- Order: Neogastropoda
- Superfamily: Buccinoidea
- Family: Buccinidae
- Genus: Ovulatibuccinum; Golikov & Sirenko, 1989

Type species
- Buccinum ovulum Dall, 1895

= Ovulatibuccinum =

Genus of gastropods

Ovulatibuccinum is a genus of sea snails, marine gastropod mollusks in the subfamily Buccininae of the family Buccinidae, the true whelks.

This genus has become a synonym of Buccinum

== Species ==
Species brought into synonymy

- Ovulatibuccinum bombycinum (Dall, 1907): synonym of Buccinum bombycinum Dall, 1907
- Ovulatibuccinum clarki (Kantor & Harasewych, 1998): synonym of Buccinum clarki (Kantor & Harasewych, 1998)
- Ovulatibuccinum fimbriatum (Golikov & Sirenko, 1988): synonym of Buccinum fimbriatum (A. N. Golikov & Sirenko, 1988) (superseded combination)
- Ovulatibuccinum ovulum (Dall, 1895): synonym of Buccinum ovulum Dall, 1895
- Ovulatibuccinum perlatum Fraussen & Chino, 2009: synonym of Buccinum chinoi Kantor, Sirenko, Zvonareva & Fedosov, 2022 (junior secondary homonym of Buccinum perlatum Conrad, 1833, and B. perlatum Kuster,1858; Buccinum chinoi is a replacement name)
