= Scabrotrophon hawaiiensis =

Scientific classification
- Kingdom: Animalia
- Phylum: Mollusca
- Class: Gastropoda
- Subclass: Caenogastropoda
- Order: Neogastropoda
- Superfamily: Muricoidea
- Family: Muricidae
- Subfamily: Trophoninae
- Genus: Scabrotrophon
- Species: S. hawaiiensis

Binomial name
- Scabrotrophon hawaiiensis Houart & Moffitt, 2010

Species of gastropod

Scabrotrophon hawaiiensis is a species of sea snail, a marine gastropod mollusk, in the family Muricidae, the murex snails or rock snails.
