= Scabrotrophon nodulosus =

Scientific classification
- Kingdom: Animalia
- Phylum: Mollusca
- Class: Gastropoda
- Subclass: Caenogastropoda
- Order: Neogastropoda
- Family: Muricidae
- Genus: Scabrotrophon
- Species: S. nodulosus

Binomial name
- Scabrotrophon nodulosus (Golikov, in Golikov & Scarlato, 1985)

Synonyms
- Trophonopsis nodulosa Golikov, 1985

Species of gastropod

Scabrotrophon nodulosus is a species of sea snail, a marine gastropod mollusk in the family Muricidae, the murex snails or rock snails.
