= Scabrotrophon densicostatus =

Scientific classification
- Kingdom: Animalia
- Phylum: Mollusca
- Class: Gastropoda
- Subclass: Caenogastropoda
- Order: Neogastropoda
- Family: Muricidae
- Genus: Scabrotrophon
- Species: S. densicostatus

Binomial name
- Scabrotrophon densicostatus (Golikov in Golikov & Scarlato, 1985)

Synonyms
- Trophonopsis densicostata Golikov in Golikov & Scarlato, 1985

Species of gastropod

Scabrotrophon densicostatus is a species of sea snail, a marine gastropod mollusk in the family Muricidae, the murex snails or rock snails.
