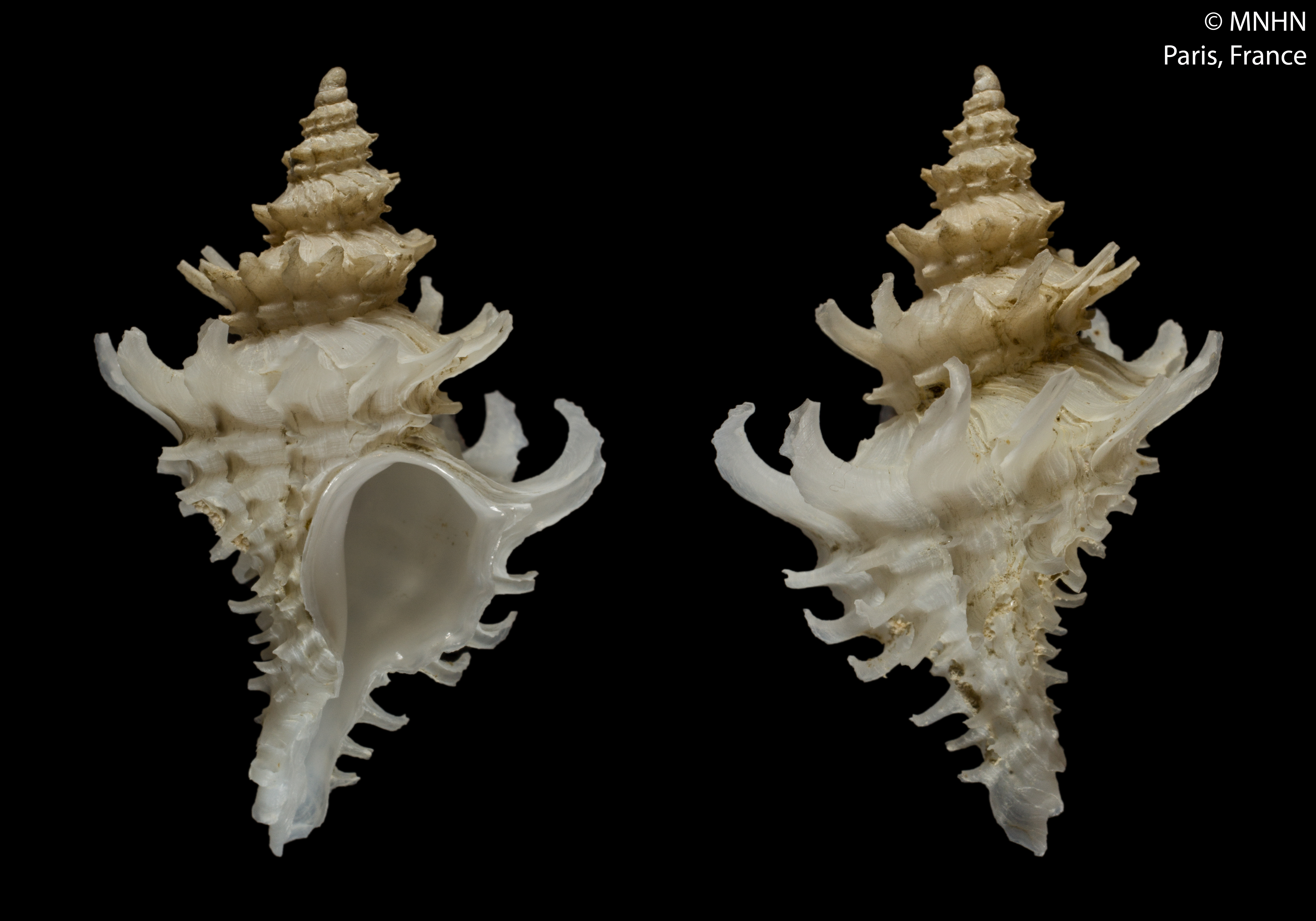
- Shell of Scabrotrophon manai (holotype at MNHN, Paris)

Scientific classification
- Kingdom: Animalia
- Phylum: Mollusca
- Class: Gastropoda
- Subclass: Caenogastropoda
- Order: Neogastropoda
- Family: Muricidae
- Subfamily: Trophoninae
- Genus: Scabrotrophon
- Species: S. manai

Binomial name
- Scabrotrophon manai Houart & Héros, 2016

= Scabrotrophon manai =

Species of gastropod

Scabrotrophon manai is a species of sea snail, a marine gastropod mollusk, in the family Muricidae, the murex snails or rock snails.

== Description ==
The length of the shell attains 31.4 mm.

== Distribution ==
This snail lives in water off Papua New Guinea.
