= Scabrotrophon tegularis =

Scientific classification
- Kingdom: Animalia
- Phylum: Mollusca
- Class: Gastropoda
- Subclass: Caenogastropoda
- Order: Neogastropoda
- Family: Muricidae
- Genus: Scabrotrophon
- Species: S. tegularis

Binomial name
- Scabrotrophon tegularis (Golikov & Gulbin, 1977)

Synonyms
- Trophon concinnum A. Adams, 1862; Trophonopsis tegularis Golikov & Gulbin, 1977

Species of gastropod

Scabrotrophon tegularis is a species of sea snail, a marine gastropod mollusk in the family Muricidae, the murex snails or rock snails.
