= Scabrotrophon undocostatus =

Scientific classification
- Kingdom: Animalia
- Phylum: Mollusca
- Class: Gastropoda
- Subclass: Caenogastropoda
- Order: Neogastropoda
- Family: Muricidae
- Genus: Scabrotrophon
- Species: S. undocostatus

Binomial name
- Scabrotrophon undocostatus (Golikov & Sirenko, 1992)

Synonyms
- Trophonopsis undocostata Golikov & Sirenko, 1992

Species of gastropod

Scabrotrophon undocostatus is a species of sea snail, a marine gastropod mollusk in the family Muricidae, the murex snails or rock snails.
