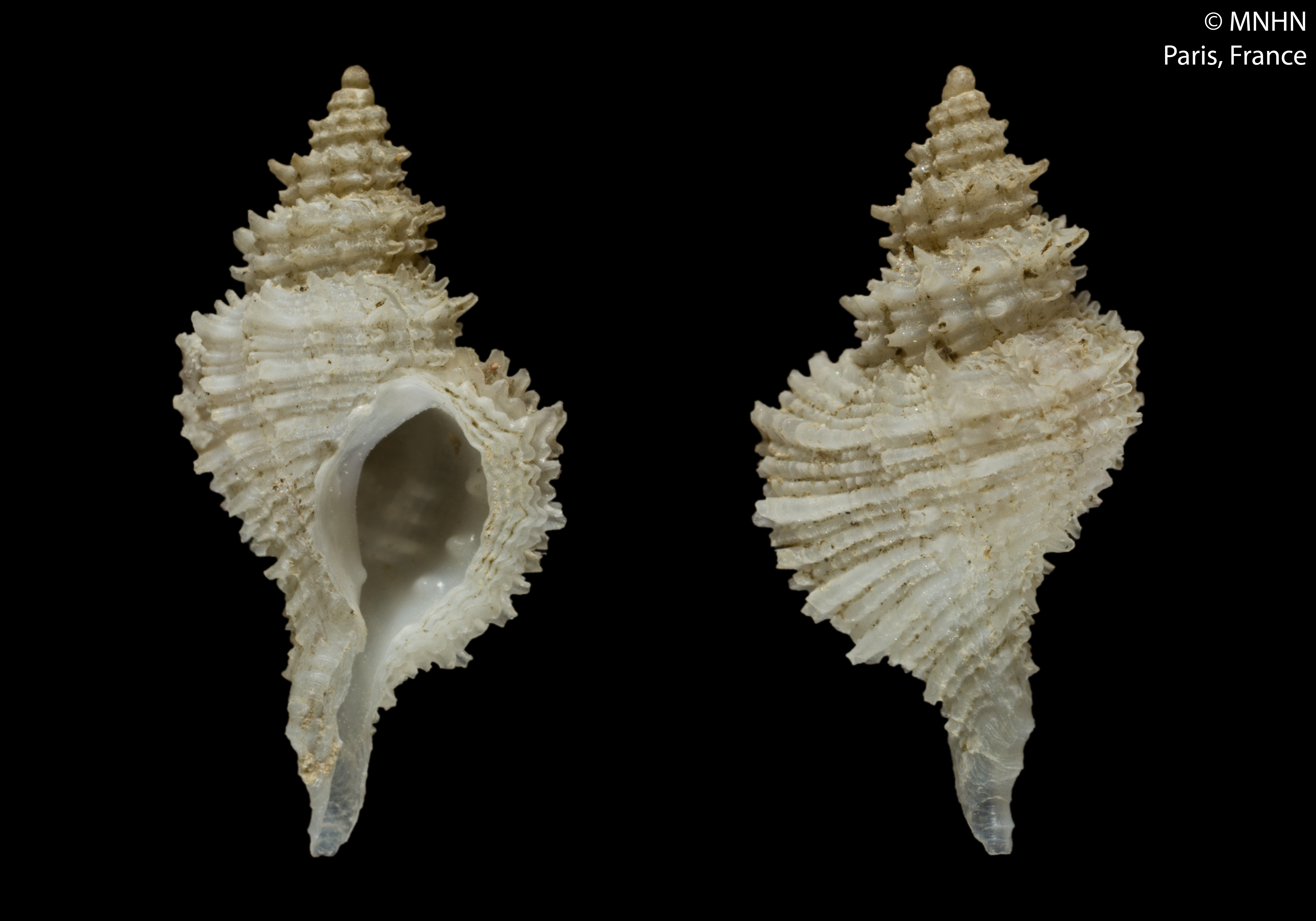
- Shell of Scabrotrophon maestratii (holotype at MNHN, Paris)

Scientific classification
- Kingdom: Animalia
- Phylum: Mollusca
- Class: Gastropoda
- Subclass: Caenogastropoda
- Order: Neogastropoda
- Family: Muricidae
- Subfamily: Trophoninae
- Genus: Scabrotrophon
- Species: S. maestratii

Binomial name
- Scabrotrophon maestratii Houart & Héros, 2016

= Scabrotrophon maestratii =

Species of gastropod

Scabrotrophon maestratii is a species of sea snail, a marine gastropod mollusk, in the family Muricidae, the murex snails or rock snails.

== Description ==
The length of the shell attains 14.9 mm.

== Distribution ==
This marine species occurs off Papua New Guinea.
