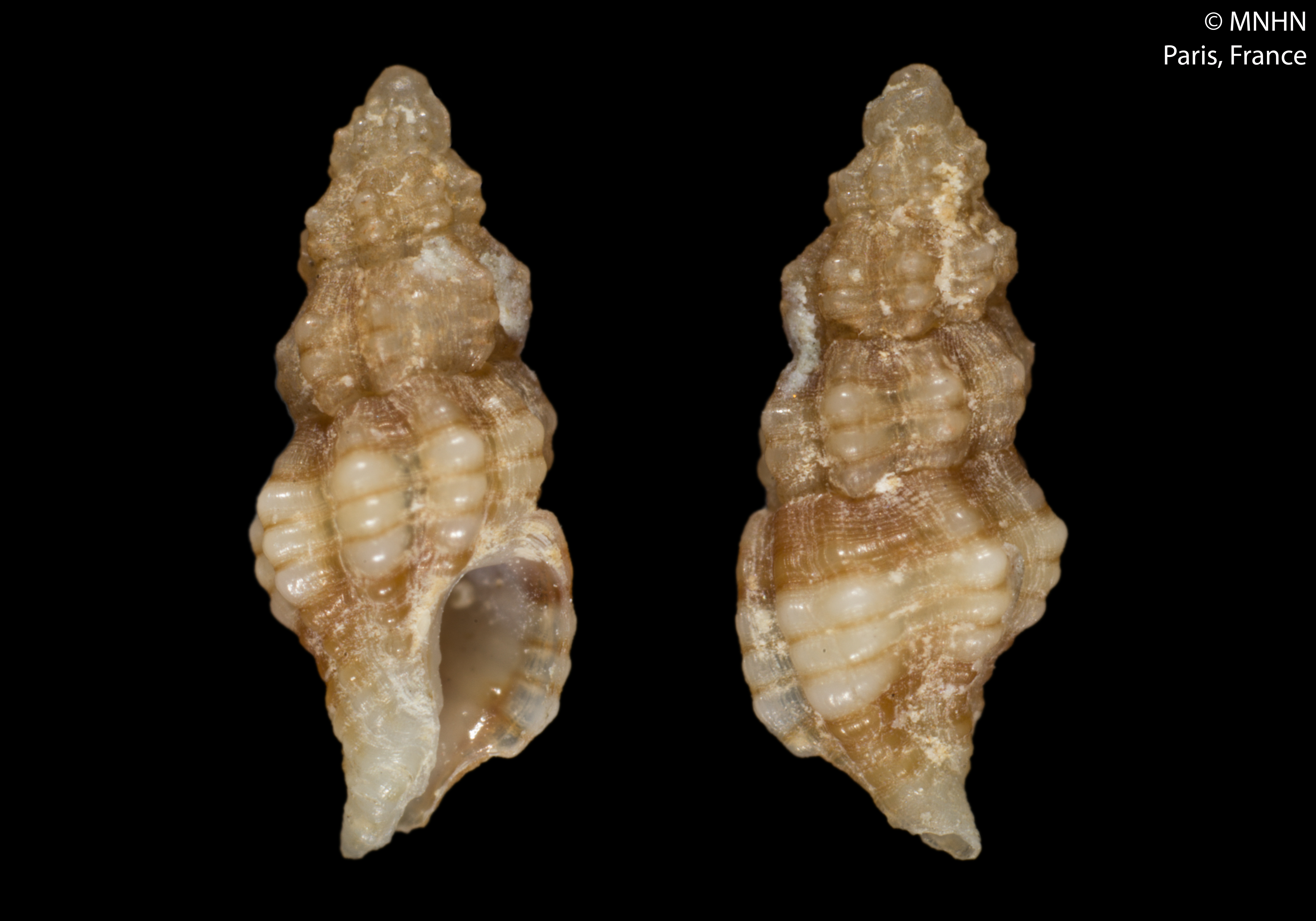

Scientific classification
- Kingdom: Animalia
- Phylum: Mollusca
- Class: Gastropoda
- Subclass: Caenogastropoda
- Order: Neogastropoda
- Superfamily: Muricoidea
- Family: Muricidae
- Subfamily: Trophoninae
- Genus: Litozamia
- Species: L. acares

Binomial name
- Litozamia acares Houart, 2013

= Litozamia acares =

Species of gastropod

Litozamia acares is a species of sea snail, a marine gastropod mollusk, in the family Muricidae, the murex snails or rock snails.

== Description ==
The length of the shell attains 4 mm.

== Distribution ==
This marine species occurs off New Caledonia.
