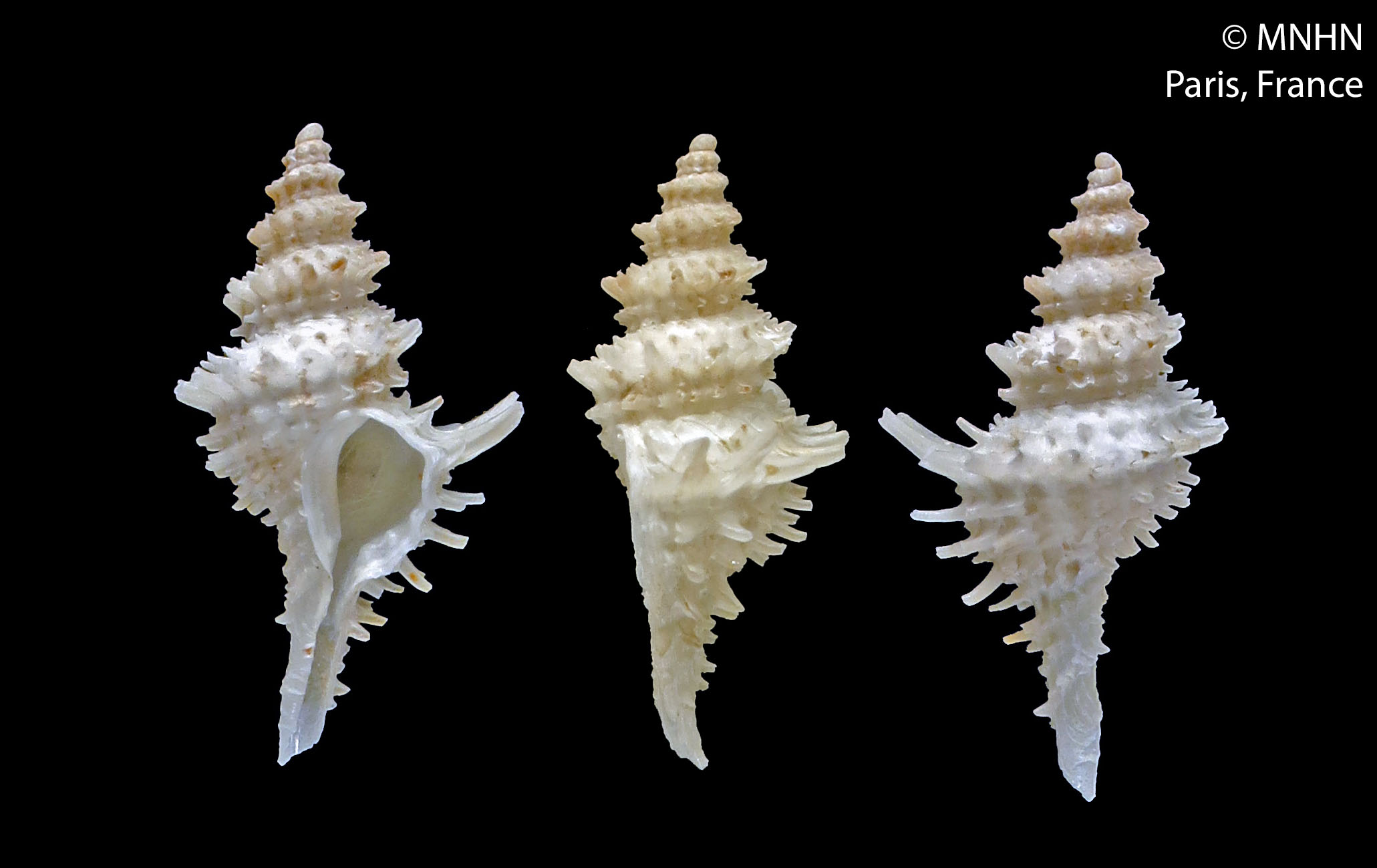
- Shell of Scabrotrophon puillandrei (paratype at MNHN, Paris)

Scientific classification
- Kingdom: Animalia
- Phylum: Mollusca
- Class: Gastropoda
- Subclass: Caenogastropoda
- Order: Neogastropoda
- Superfamily: Muricoidea
- Family: Muricidae
- Subfamily: Trophoninae
- Genus: Scabrotrophon
- Species: S. puillandrei

Binomial name
- Scabrotrophon puillandrei Houart & Héros, 2016

= Scabrotrophon puillandrei =

Species of gastropod

Scabrotrophon puillandrei is a species of sea snail, a marine gastropod mollusk, in the family Muricidae, the murex snails or rock snails.

== Distribution ==
This marine species occurs off Papua New Guinea.
