= Scabrotrophon scitulus =

Scientific classification
- Kingdom: Animalia
- Phylum: Mollusca
- Class: Gastropoda
- Subclass: Caenogastropoda
- Order: Neogastropoda
- Family: Muricidae
- Genus: Scabrotrophon
- Species: S. scitulus

Binomial name
- Scabrotrophon scitulus (Dall, 1891)

Synonyms
- Nipponotrophon scitulus (Dall, 1891); Trophon (Boreotrophon) scitulus Dall, 1891; Trophon scitulus Dall, 1891 (basionym)

Species of gastropod

Scabrotrophon scitulus is a species of sea snail, a marine gastropod mollusk in the family Muricidae, the murex snails or rock snails.
