= Buccinum fimbriatum =

Scientific classification
- Kingdom: Animalia
- Phylum: Mollusca
- Class: Gastropoda
- Subclass: Caenogastropoda
- Order: Neogastropoda
- Family: Buccinidae
- Genus: Buccinum
- Species: B. fimbriatum

Binomial name
- Buccinum fimbriatum (Golikov & Sirenko, 1988)

Synonyms
- Bathybuccinum (Ovulatibuccinum) fimbriatum A. N. Golikov & Sirenko, 1988 · unaccepted (basionym); Bathybuccinum fimbriatum A. N. Golikov & Sirenko, 1988; Ovulatibuccinum fimbriatum (A. N. Golikov & Sirenko, 1988) superseded combination

Species of gastropod

Buccinum fimbriatum is a species of sea snail, a marine gastropod mollusc in the family Buccinidae, the true whelks.

== Description ==
The length of the shell attains 14.2 mm.

== Distribution ==
This marine species occurs off Japan.
