= Scabrotrophon emphaticus =

Scientific classification
- Kingdom: Animalia
- Phylum: Mollusca
- Class: Gastropoda
- Subclass: Caenogastropoda
- Order: Neogastropoda
- Family: Muricidae
- Genus: Scabrotrophon
- Species: S. emphaticus

Binomial name
- Scabrotrophon emphaticus (Habe & Ito, 1965)

Synonyms
- Trophon scitula emphaticus Habe & Ito, 1965

Species of gastropod

Scabrotrophon emphaticus is a species of sea snail, a marine gastropod mollusk in the family Muricidae, the murex snails or rock snails.
