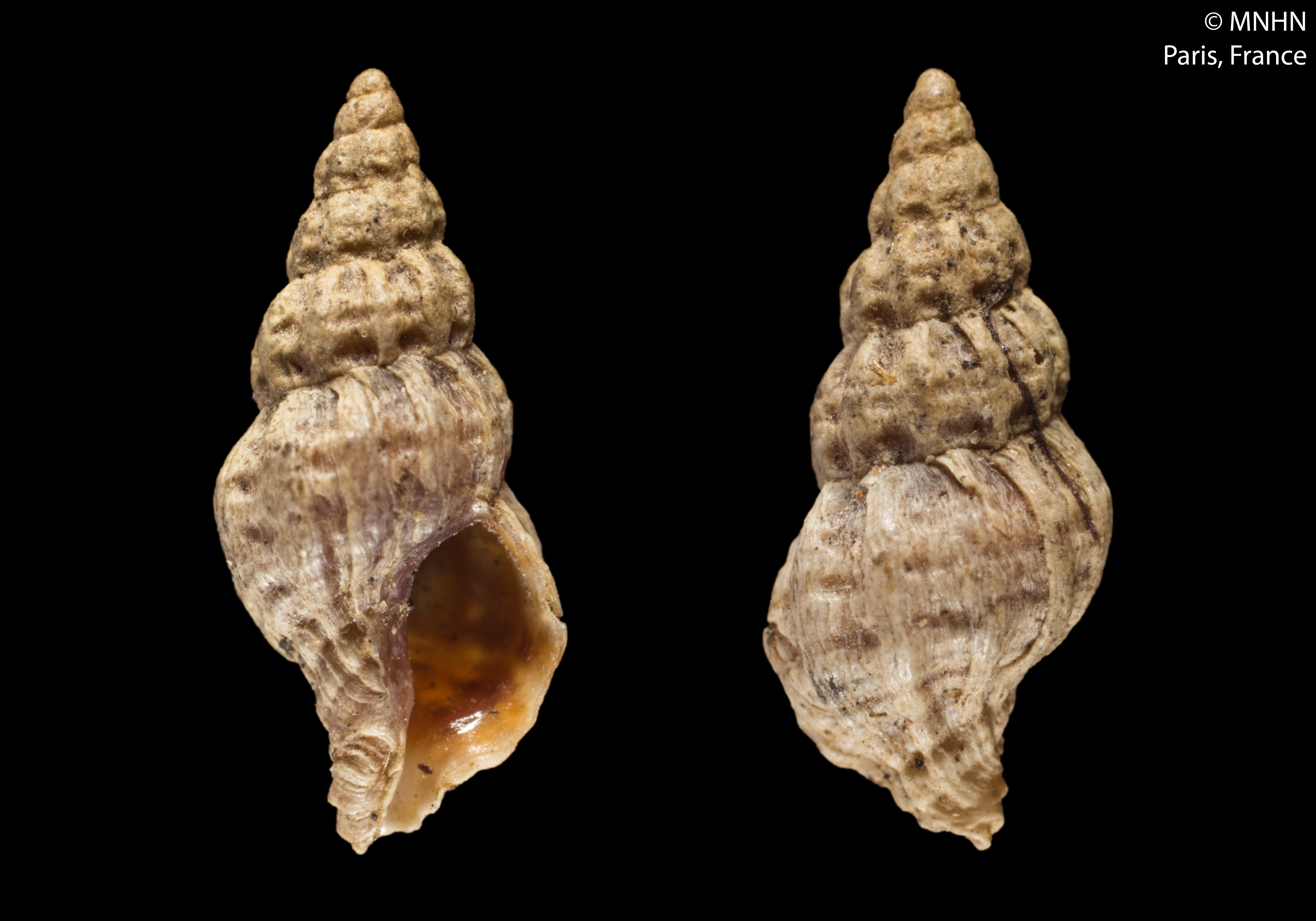

Scientific classification
- Kingdom: Animalia
- Phylum: Mollusca
- Class: Gastropoda
- Subclass: Caenogastropoda
- Order: Neogastropoda
- Family: Muricidae
- Genus: Benthoxystus
- Species: B. petterdi

Binomial name
- Benthoxystus petterdi (Brazier in Crosse, 1870)

Synonyms
- Trophon clathratus Tenison Woods, 1876; Trophon petterdi Brazier in Crosse, 1870

= Benthoxystus petterdi =

Species of gastropod

Benthoxystus petterdi is a species of sea snail, a marine gastropod mollusc in the family Muricidae, the murex snails or rock snails.

== Distribution ==
This marine species occurs off Tasmania, Australia.
