= Scabrotrophon cerritensis =

Scientific classification
- Kingdom: Animalia
- Phylum: Mollusca
- Class: Gastropoda
- Subclass: Caenogastropoda
- Order: Neogastropoda
- Family: Muricidae
- Genus: Scabrotrophon
- Species: S. cerritensis

Binomial name
- Scabrotrophon cerritensis (Arnold, 1903)

Synonyms
- Trophon (Boreotrophon) cerritensis Arnold, 1903

Species of gastropod

Scabrotrophon cerritensis is a species of sea snail, a marine gastropod mollusk in the family Muricidae, the murex snails or rock snails.
