= Enatimene bassetti =

Scientific classification
- Kingdom: Animalia
- Phylum: Mollusca
- Class: Gastropoda
- Subclass: Caenogastropoda
- Order: Neogastropoda
- Family: Muricidae
- Genus: Enatimene
- Species: E. bassetti

Binomial name
- Enatimene bassetti (Houart, 1998)

Synonyms
- Trophonopsis bassetti Houart, 1998

Species of gastropod

Enatimene bassetti is a species of sea snail, a marine gastropod mollusk in the family Muricidae, the murex snails or rock snails.
