= Scabrotrophon grovesi =

Scientific classification
- Kingdom: Animalia
- Phylum: Mollusca
- Class: Gastropoda
- Subclass: Caenogastropoda
- Order: Neogastropoda
- Family: Muricidae
- Genus: Scabrotrophon
- Species: S. grovesi

Binomial name
- Scabrotrophon grovesi McLean, 1996

Species of gastropod

Scabrotrophon grovesi is a species of sea snail, a marine gastropod mollusk in the family Muricidae, the murex snails or rock snails.
