= Litozamia rudolphi =

Scientific classification
- Kingdom: Animalia
- Phylum: Mollusca
- Class: Gastropoda
- Subclass: Caenogastropoda
- Order: Neogastropoda
- Family: Muricidae
- Genus: Litozamia
- Species: L. rudolphi

Binomial name
- Litozamia rudolphi (Brazier, 1894)

Synonyms
- Peristernia rudolphi Brazier, 1894; Trophon longior Verco, 1909

Species of gastropod

Litozamia rudolphi is a species of sea snail, a marine gastropod mollusk in the family Muricidae, the murex snails or rock snails.
