= Xenotrophon euschema =

Scientific classification
- Kingdom: Animalia
- Phylum: Mollusca
- Class: Gastropoda
- Subclass: Caenogastropoda
- Order: Neogastropoda
- Family: Muricidae
- Genus: Xenotrophon
- Species: X. euschema

Binomial name
- Xenotrophon euschema (Iredale, 1929)

Synonyms
- Trophon euschema Iredale, 1929

Species of gastropod

Xenotrophon euschema is a species of sea snail, a marine gastropod mollusk in the family Muricidae, the murex snails or rock snails.
