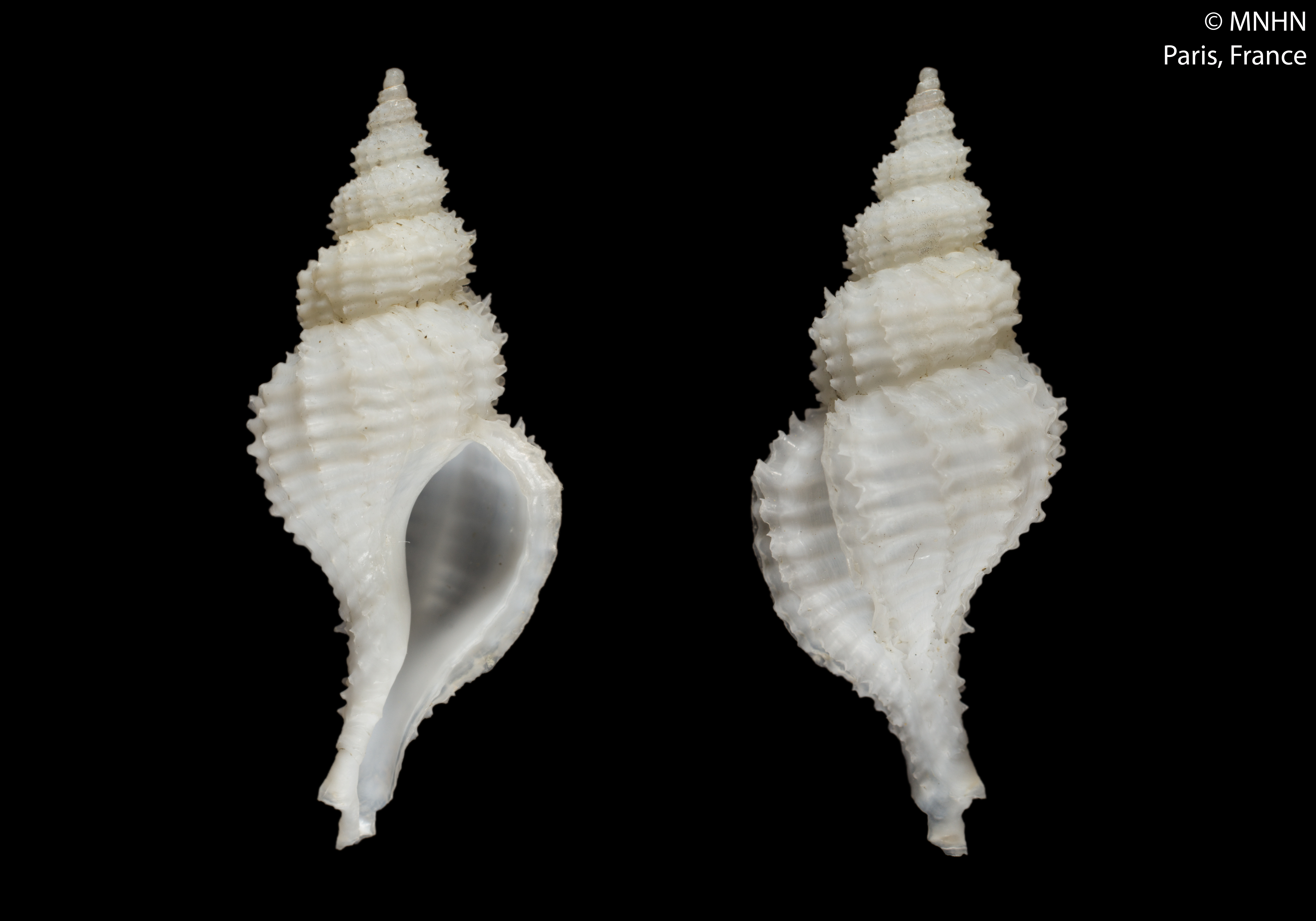
- Shell of Scabrotrophon chunfui (holotype at MNHN, Paris)

Scientific classification
- Kingdom: Animalia
- Phylum: Mollusca
- Class: Gastropoda
- Subclass: Caenogastropoda
- Order: Neogastropoda
- Superfamily: Muricoidea
- Family: Muricidae
- Subfamily: Trophoninae
- Genus: Scabrotrophon; Scabrotrophon maltzani Kobelt, W. & H.C. Küster, 1878

Type species
- Trophon maltzani Kobelt, 1878

= Scabrotrophon =

Genus of gastropods

Scabrotrophon is a genus of sea snails, marine gastropod molluscs in the subfamily Trophoninae ( of the family Muricidae, the murex snails or rock snails.

== Species ==
Species within the genus Scabrotrophon include:

- Scabrotrophon bondarevi (Houart, 1995)
- Scabrotrophon buldirensis Houart, Vermeij & Wiedrick, 2019
- Scabrotrophon callosus (Nomura & Hatai, 1940)
- Scabrotrophon cerritensis (Arnold, 1903)
- Scabrotrophon chunfui Houart & Lan, 2001
- Scabrotrophon clarki McLean, 1996
- Scabrotrophon densicostatus (Golikov in Golikov & Scarlato, 1985)
- Scabrotrophon densilamellatus (Golikov & Gulbin, 1977)
- Scabrotrophon emphaticus (Habe & Ito, 1965)
- Scabrotrophon fabricii (Møller, 1842)
- Scabrotrophon grovesi McLean, 1996
- Scabrotrophon hawaiiensis Houart & Moffitt, 2010
- Scabrotrophon inspiratus Houart, 2003
- Scabrotrophon kantori Houart, Vermeij & Wiedrick, 2019
- Scabrotrophon lani Houart & Liang, 2004
- Scabrotrophon lasius (Dall, 1919)
- Scabrotrophon lima Houart, Vermeij & Wiedrick, 2019
- Scabrotrophon macleani Houart, Vermeij & Wiedrick, 2019
- Scabrotrophon maestratii Houart & Héros, 2016
- Scabrotrophon maltzani (Kobelt,1878)
- Scabrotrophon manai Houart & Héros, 2016
- Scabrotrophon maranii Houart & Héros, 2016
- Scabrotrophon moresbyensis Houart, Vermeij & Wiedrick, 2019
- Scabrotrophon nodulosus (Golikov, in Golikov & Scarlato, 1985)
- Scabrotrophon norafosterae Houart, Vermeij & Wiedrick, 2019
- Scabrotrophon puillandrei Houart & Héros, 2016
- Scabrotrophon regina (Houart, 1985)
- Scabrotrophon rossicus (Egorov, 1993)
- Scabrotrophon scarlatoi (Golikov & Sirenko, 1992)
- Scabrotrophon scitulus (Dall, 1891)
- Scabrotrophon stuarti (E. A. Smith, 1880)
- Scabrotrophon tegularis (Golikov & Gulbin, 1977)
- Scabrotrophon trifidus Houart, Vermeij & Wiedrick, 2019
- Scabrotrophon undocostatus (Golikov & Sirenko, 1992)
- Scabrotrophon yurii (Egorov, 1994)

Species brought into synonymy

- Scabrotrophon kamchatkanus (Dall, 1902): synonym of Boreotrophon kamchatkanus Dall, 1902
