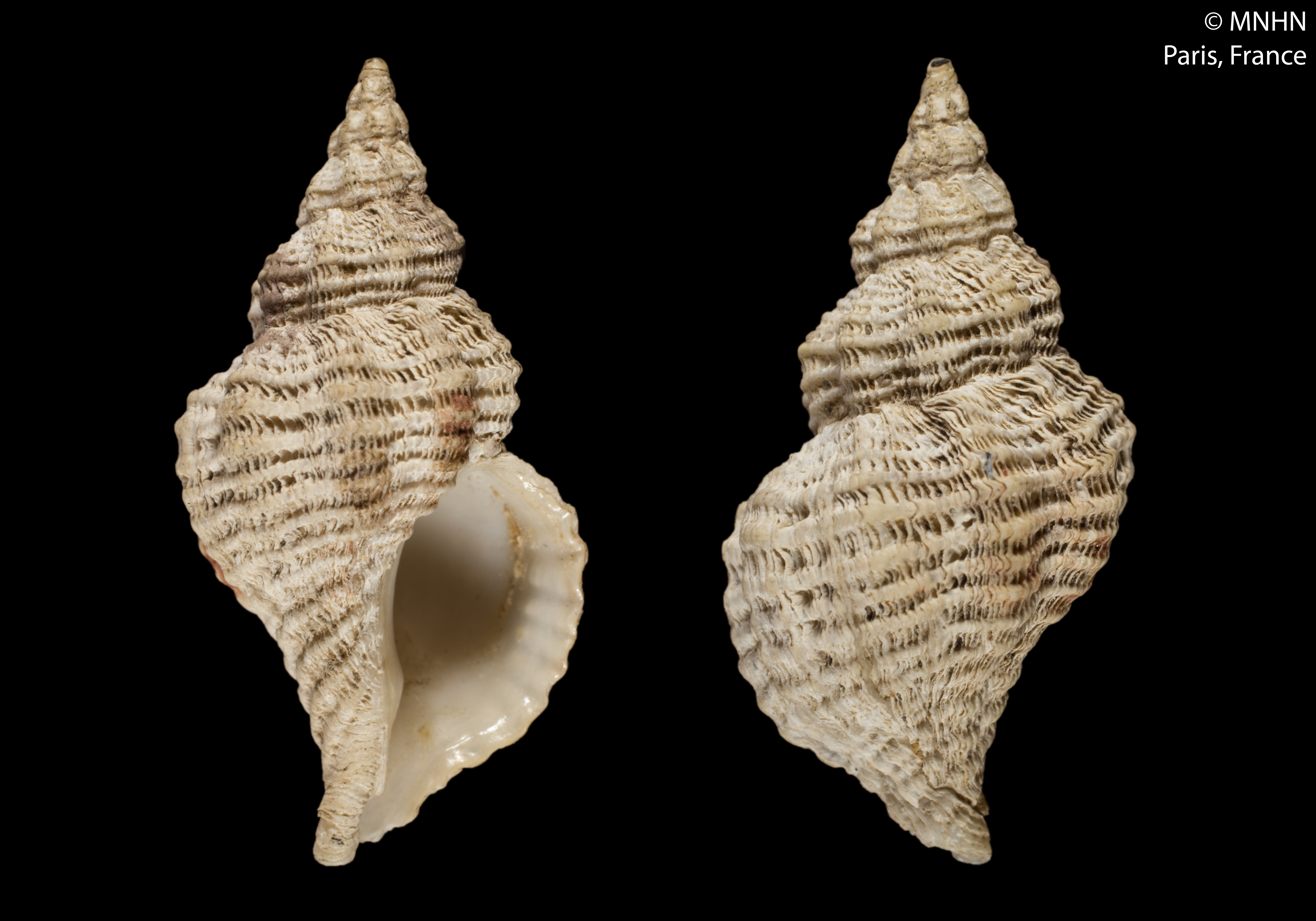
- Shell of Fuegotrophon pallidus (holotype at MNHN, Paris)

Scientific classification
- Kingdom: Animalia
- Phylum: Mollusca
- Class: Gastropoda
- Subclass: Caenogastropoda
- Order: Neogastropoda
- Family: Muricidae
- Genus: Fuegotrophon
- Species: F. pallidus

Binomial name
- Fuegotrophon pallidus (Broderip, 1833)

Synonyms
- Fusus (Trophon) crispus Gould, 1849; Fusus crispus Gould, 1849; Fusus fasciculatus Hombron & Jacquinot, 1854; Fusus fimbriatus Hupé in Gay, 1854; Murex pallidus Broderip, 1833 (original combination); Trophon (Fuegotrophon) pallidus (Broderip, 1833); Trophon crispus Gould, 1849; Trophon crispus var. burdwoodianum Strebel, 1908; Trophon gouldi Cossmann, 1903; Trophon pallidus (Broderip, 1833); Urosalpinx hupeanus Ihering, 1907; Xymene gouldi (Cossmann, 1903)

= Fuegotrophon pallidus =

Species of gastropod

Fuegotrophon pallidus is a species of sea snail, a marine gastropod mollusc in the family Muricidae, the murex snails or rock snails.

== Description ==
The length of the shell attains 21.9 mm.

== Distribution ==
This marine species was found at the Strait of Magellan off Chile.
