= Benthoxystus =

Scientific classification
- Kingdom: Animalia
- Phylum: Mollusca
- Class: Gastropoda
- Subclass: Caenogastropoda
- Order: Neogastropoda
- Superfamily: Muricoidea
- Family: Muricidae
- Subfamily: Trophoninae
- Genus: Benthoxystus; Iredale, 1929

Type species
- Trophon columnarius Hedley & May, 1908

Genus of gastropods

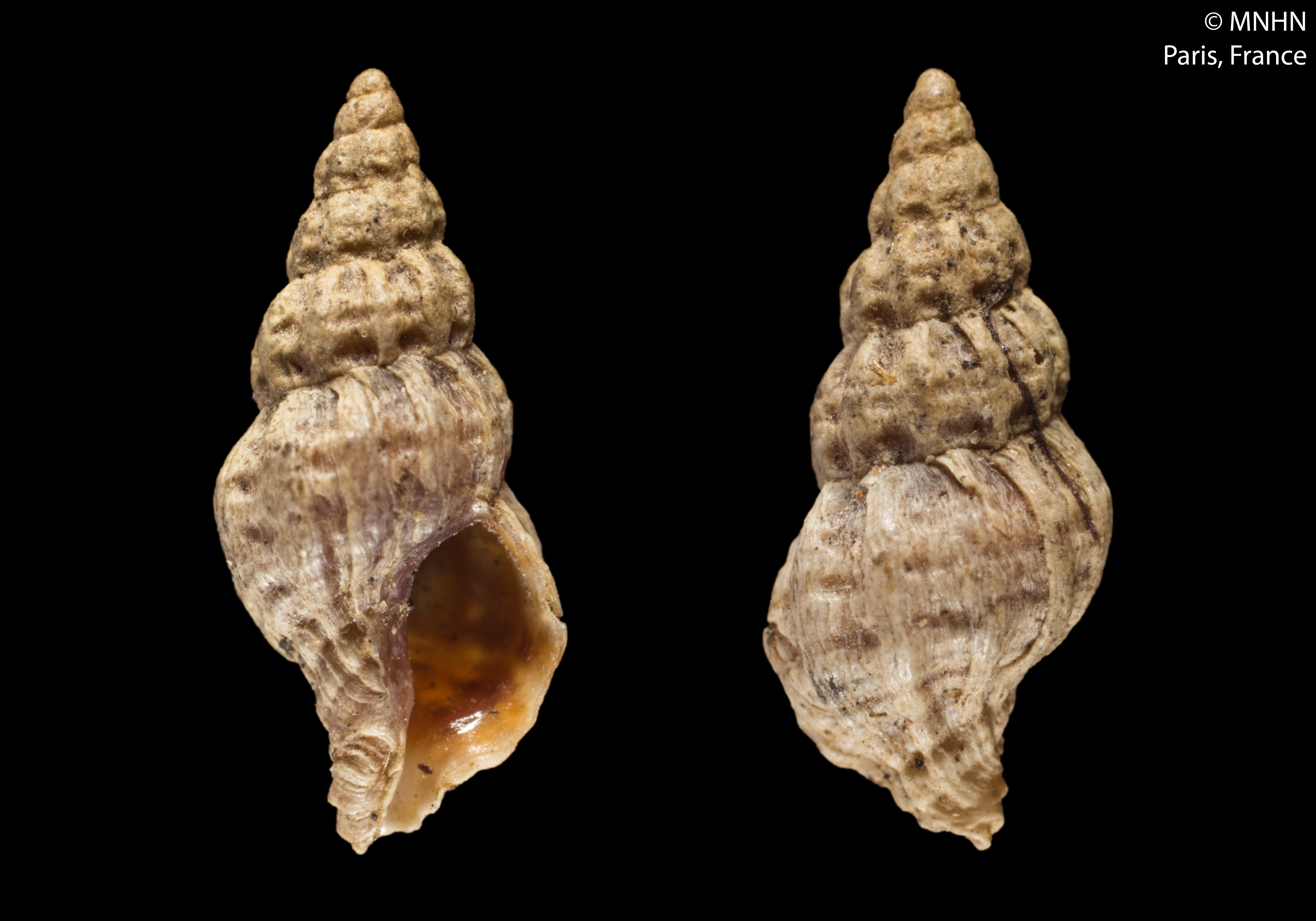
Benthoxystus petterdi

Benthoxystus is a genus of sea snails, marine gastropod mollusks in the family Muricidae, the murex snails or rock snails.

== Species ==
Species within the genus Benthoxystus include:

- Benthoxystus columnarius (Hedley & May, 1908)
- Benthoxystus petterdi (Brazier in Crosse, 1870)
