= Conchatalos lacrima =

Scientific classification
- Kingdom: Animalia
- Phylum: Mollusca
- Class: Gastropoda
- Subclass: Caenogastropoda
- Order: Neogastropoda
- Family: Muricidae
- Genus: Conchatalos
- Species: C. lacrima

Binomial name
- Conchatalos lacrima (Houart, 1991)

Synonyms
- Trophon lacrima Houart, 1991

Species of gastropod

Conchatalos lacrima is a species of sea snail, a marine gastropod mollusk in the family Muricidae, the murex snails or rock snails.
