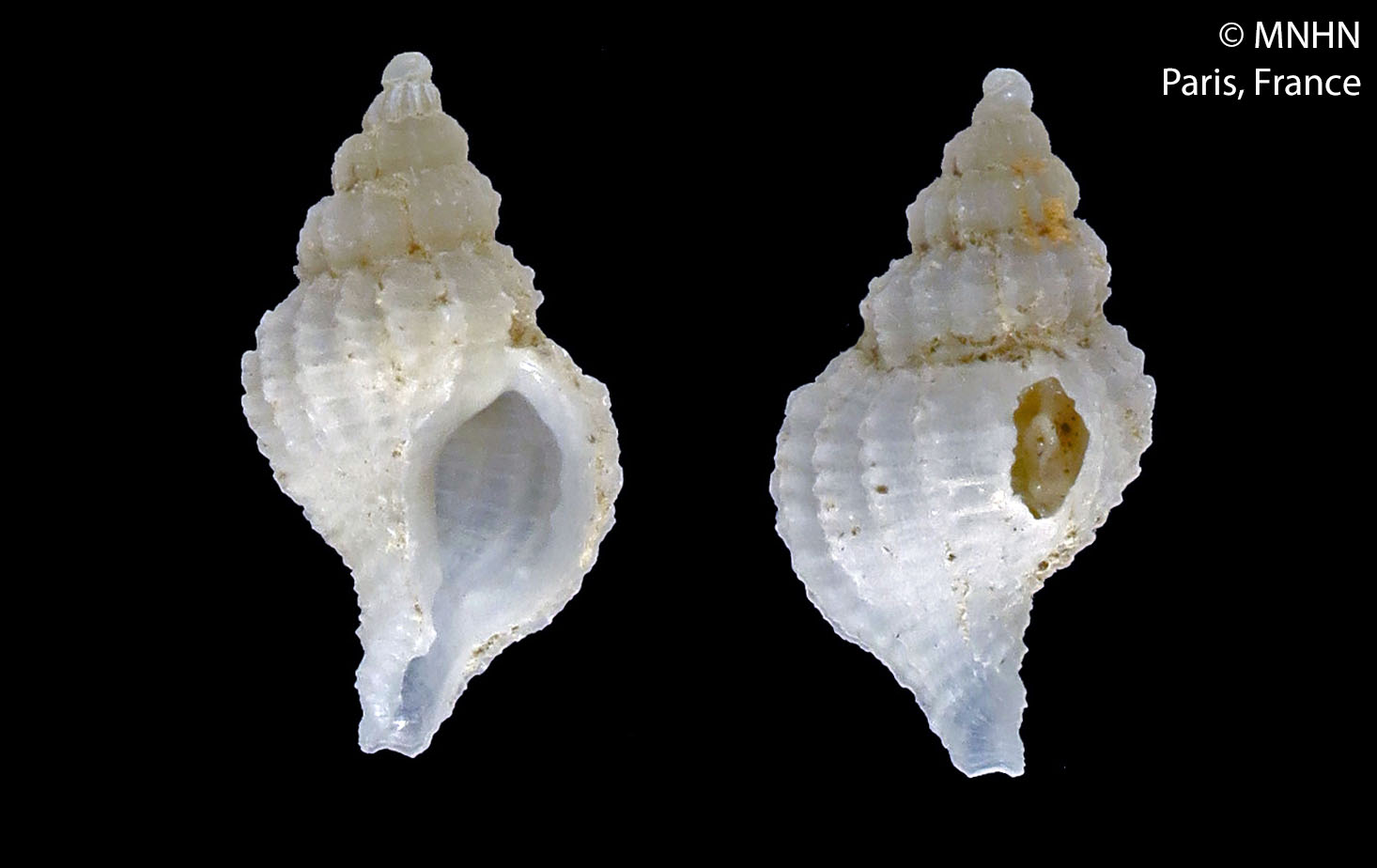
- Shell of Conchatalos samadiae (specimen at MNHN, Paris)

Scientific classification
- Kingdom: Animalia
- Phylum: Mollusca
- Class: Gastropoda
- Subclass: Caenogastropoda
- Order: Neogastropoda
- Family: Muricidae
- Genus: Conchatalos
- Species: C. samadiae

Binomial name
- Conchatalos samadiae Houart & Héros, 2016

= Conchatalos samadiae =

Species of gastropod

Conchatalos samadiae is a species of sea snail, a marine gastropod mollusk, in the family Muricidae, the murex snails or rock snails.

== Distribution ==
This species occurs in the Solomon Sea, Papua New Guinea.
