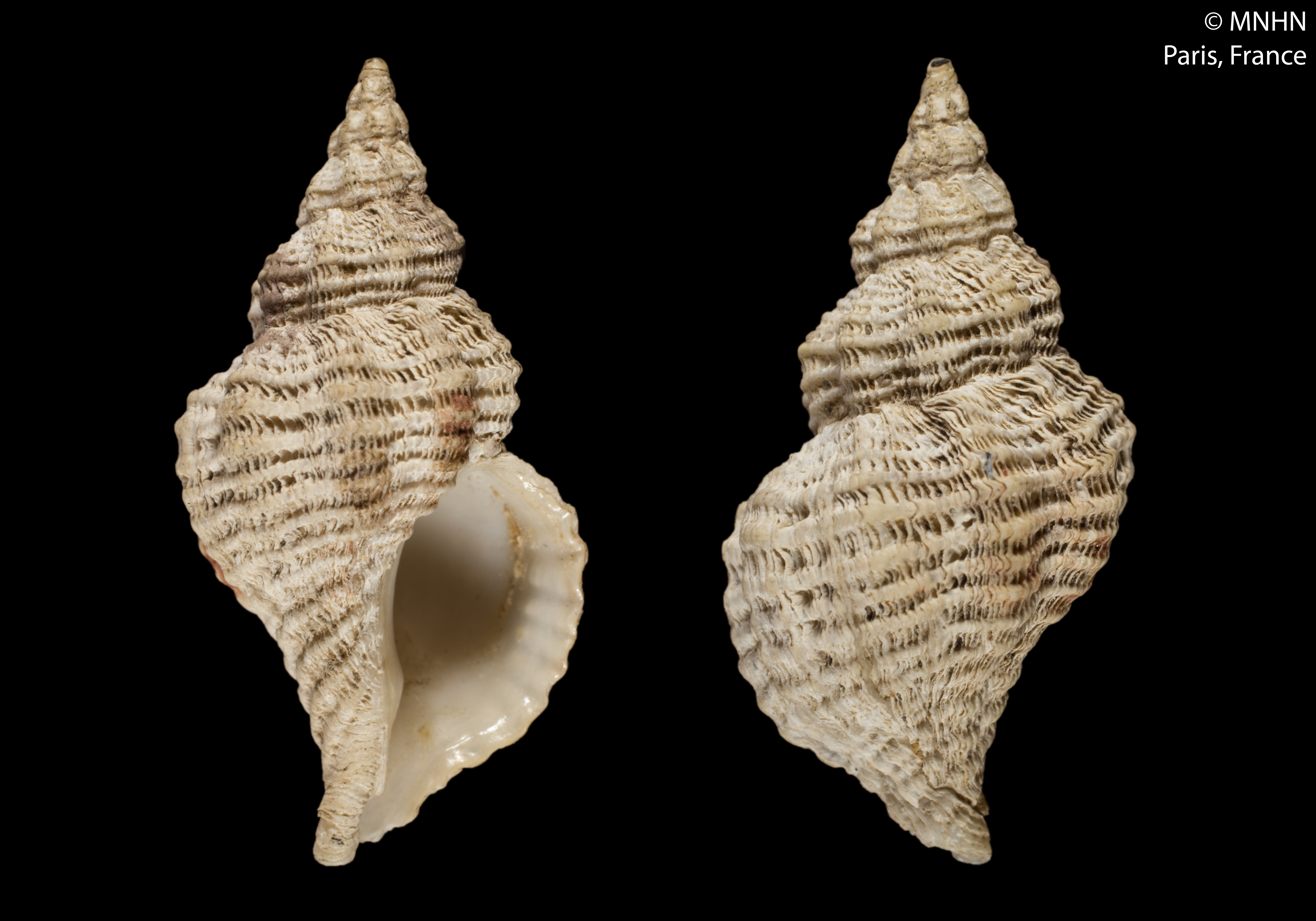
- Shell of Fuegotrophon pallidus

Scientific classification
- Kingdom: Animalia
- Phylum: Mollusca
- Class: Gastropoda
- Subclass: Caenogastropoda
- Order: Neogastropoda
- Superfamily: Muricoidea
- Family: Muricidae
- Subfamily: Trophoninae
- Genus: Fuegotrophon; Powell, 1951

Type species
- Fusus crispus Gould, 1849

Synonyms
- Trophon (Fuegotrophon) Powell, 1951

= Fuegotrophon =

Genus of gastropods

Fuegotrophon is a genus of sea snails, marine gastropod mollusks in the family Muricidae, the murex snails or rock snails.

== Species ==
Species within the genus Fuegotrophon include:

- Fuegotrophon amettei (Carcelles, 1946)
- Fuegotrophon malvinarum (Strebel, 1908)
- Fuegotrophon pallidus (Broderip, 1833)
