= Afritrophon =

Scientific classification
- Kingdom: Animalia
- Phylum: Mollusca
- Class: Gastropoda
- Subclass: Caenogastropoda
- Order: Neogastropoda
- Family: Muricidae
- Subfamily: Trophoninae
- Genus: Afritrophon; Tomlin, 1947

Genus of gastropods

Afritrophon is a genus of sea snails, marine gastropod mollusks in the family Muricidae, the murex snails or rock snails.

== Species ==
Species within the genus Afritrophon include:

- Afritrophon agulhasensis (Thiele, 1925)
- Afritrophon inglorius Houart, 1987
- Afritrophon insignis (Sowerby III, 1900)
- Afritrophon kowieensis (Sowerby III, 1901)
