= Scabrotrophon callosus =

Scientific classification
- Kingdom: Animalia
- Phylum: Mollusca
- Class: Gastropoda
- Subclass: Caenogastropoda
- Order: Neogastropoda
- Family: Muricidae
- Genus: Scabrotrophon
- Species: S. callosus

Binomial name
- Scabrotrophon callosus (Nomura & Hatai, 1940)

Synonyms
- Trophon (Trophonopsis) callosus Nomura & Hatai, 1940

Species of gastropod

Scabrotrophon callosus is a species of sea snail, a marine gastropod mollusk in the family Muricidae, the murex snails or rock snails.
