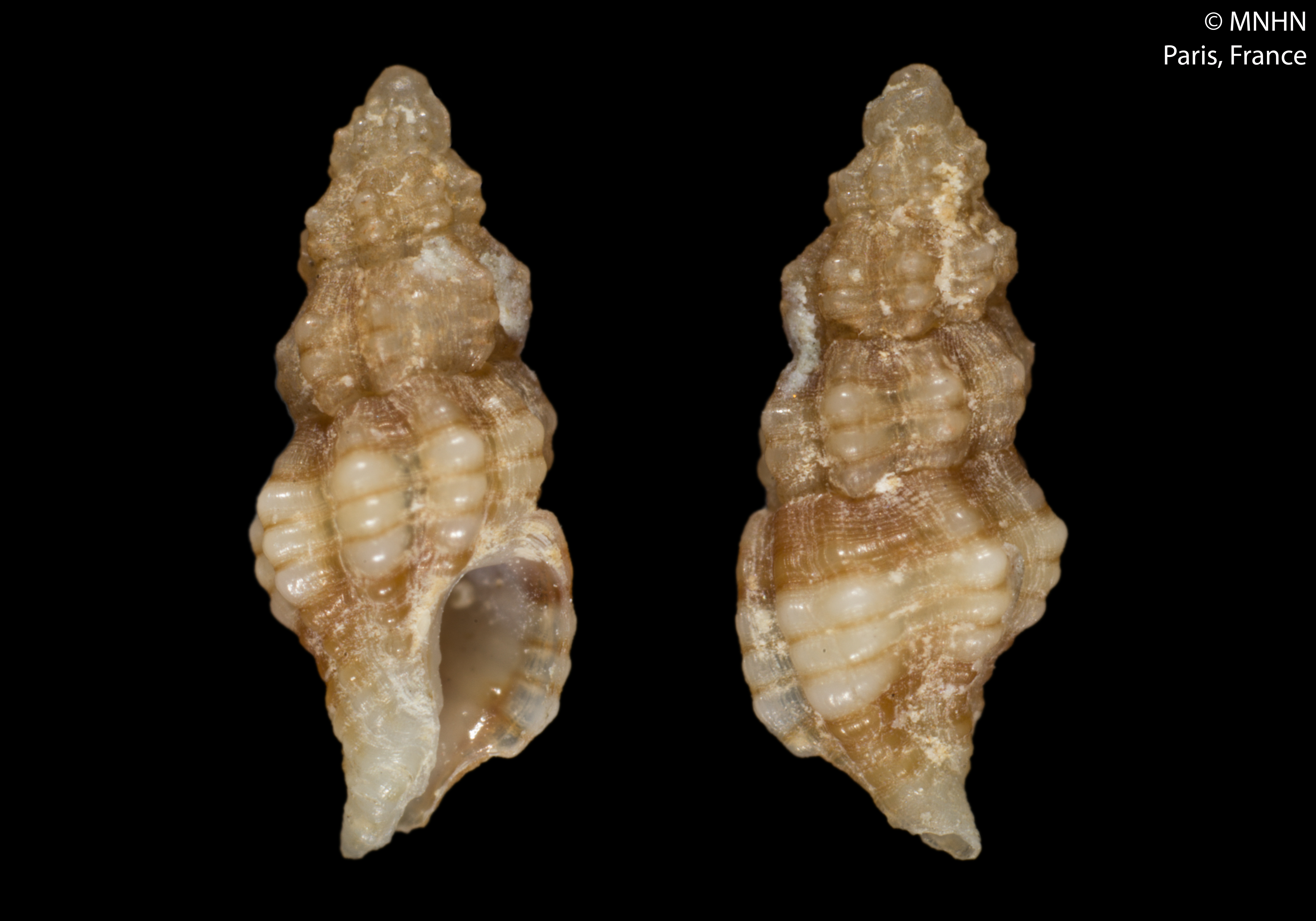
- Shell of Litozamia acares (holotype at MNHN, Paris)

Scientific classification
- Kingdom: Animalia
- Phylum: Mollusca
- Class: Gastropoda
- Subclass: Caenogastropoda
- Order: Neogastropoda
- Superfamily: Muricoidea
- Family: Muricidae
- Subfamily: Trophoninae
- Genus: Litozamia; Iredale, 1929

Type species
- Peristernia rudolphi Brazier, 1894

= Litozamia =

Genus of gastropods

Litozamia is a genus of sea snails, marine gastropod mollusks in the subfamily Trophoninae of the family Muricidae, the murex snails or rock snails.

== Species ==
Species within the genus Litozamia include:

- Litozamia acares Houart, 2013
- Litozamia brazieri (Tenison Woods, 1876)
- Litozamia latior (Verco, 1909)
- Litozamia longior (Verco, 1909)
- Litozamia rudolphi (Brazier, 1894)
- Litozamia subtropicalis (Iredale, 1913)
- Litozamia tropis Houart, 1995
