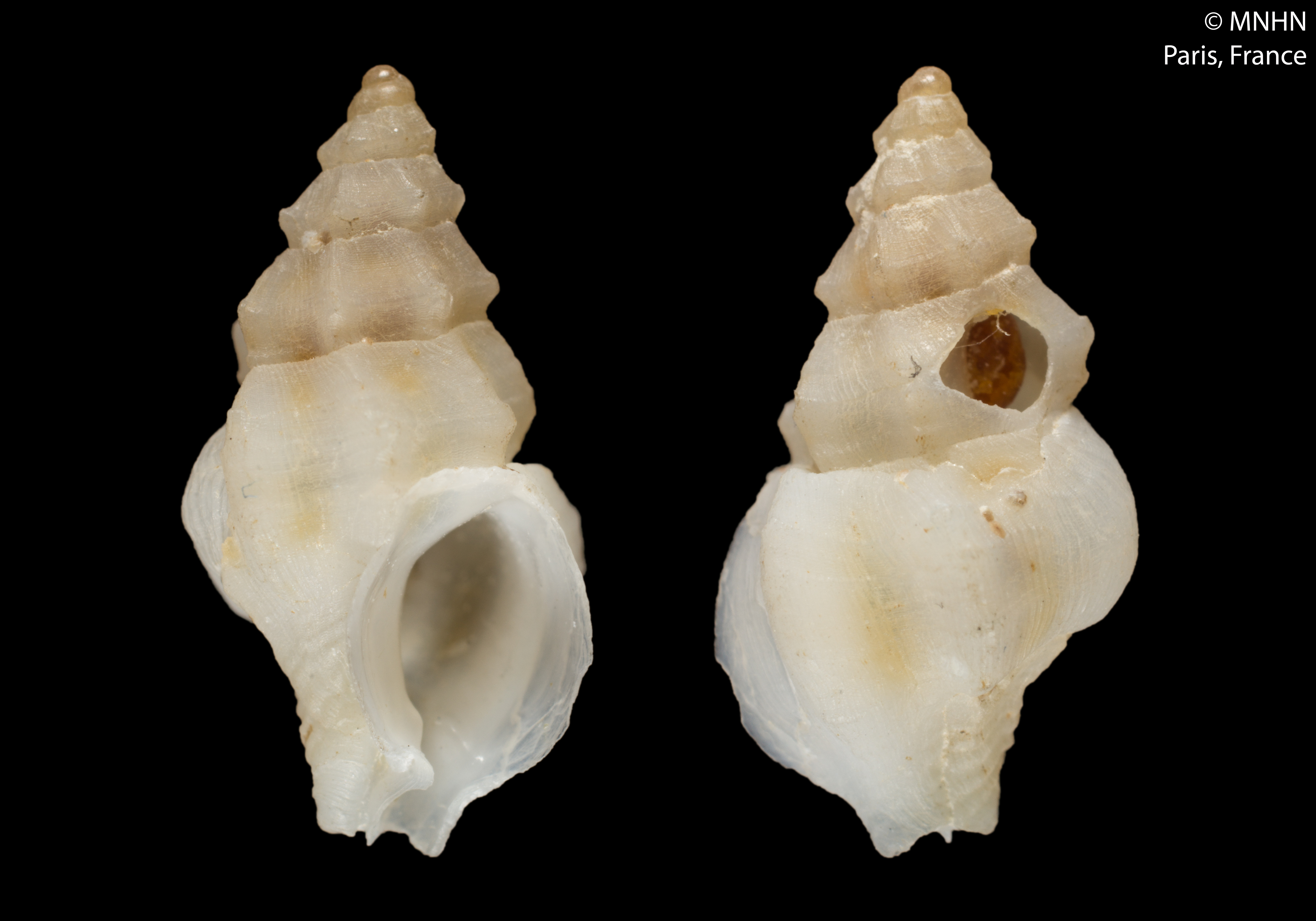
- Shell of Conchatalos vaubani (specimen at MNHN, Paris)

Scientific classification
- Kingdom: Animalia
- Phylum: Mollusca
- Class: Gastropoda
- Subclass: Caenogastropoda
- Order: Neogastropoda
- Family: Muricidae
- Genus: Conchatalos
- Species: C. vaubani

Binomial name
- Conchatalos vaubani Houart, 1995

= Conchatalos vaubani =

Species of gastropod

Conchatalos vaubani is a species of sea snail, a marine gastropod mollusk in the family Muricidae, the murex snails or rock snails.

== Distribution ==
This marine species occurs off New Caledonia.
