= Minortrophon =

Scientific classification
- Kingdom: Animalia
- Phylum: Mollusca
- Class: Gastropoda
- Subclass: Caenogastropoda
- Order: Neogastropoda
- Family: Muricidae
- Subfamily: Trophoninae
- Genus: Minortrophon; Finlay, 1926

Genus of gastropods

Minortrophon is a genus of sea snails, marine gastropod molluscs in the family Muricidae, the murex snails or rock snails.

== Species ==
Species within the genus Minortrophon include:

- Minortrophon crassiliratus (Suter, 1908)
- Minortrophon priestleyi (Hedley, 1916)
