= Xenotrophon =

Scientific classification
- Kingdom: Animalia
- Phylum: Mollusca
- Class: Gastropoda
- Subclass: Caenogastropoda
- Order: Neogastropoda
- Family: Muricidae
- Subfamily: Trophoninae
- Genus: Xenotrophon; Iredale, 1929

Genus of gastropods

Xenotrophon is a genus of sea snails, marine gastropod mollusks in the family Muricidae, the murex snails or rock snails.

== Species ==
Species within the genus Xenotrophon include:

- Xenotrophon euschema (Iredale, 1929)
