= Anatrophon sarmentosus =

Scientific classification
- Kingdom: Animalia
- Phylum: Mollusca
- Class: Gastropoda
- Subclass: Caenogastropoda
- Order: Neogastropoda
- Family: Muricidae
- Genus: Anatrophon
- Species: A. sarmentosus

Binomial name
- Anatrophon sarmentosus (Hedley & May, 1908)

Synonyms
- Trophon sarmentosus Hedley & May, 1908

Species of gastropod

Anatrophon sarmentosus is a species of sea snail, a marine gastropod mollusk in the family Muricidae, the murex snails or rock snails.
