= Afritrophon inglorius =

Scientific classification
- Kingdom: Animalia
- Phylum: Mollusca
- Class: Gastropoda
- Subclass: Caenogastropoda
- Order: Neogastropoda
- Family: Muricidae
- Genus: Afritrophon
- Species: A. inglorius

Binomial name
- Afritrophon inglorius Houart, 1987

Species of gastropod

Afritrophon inglorius is a species of sea snail, a marine gastropod mollusc in the family Muricidae, the murex snails or rock snails.
