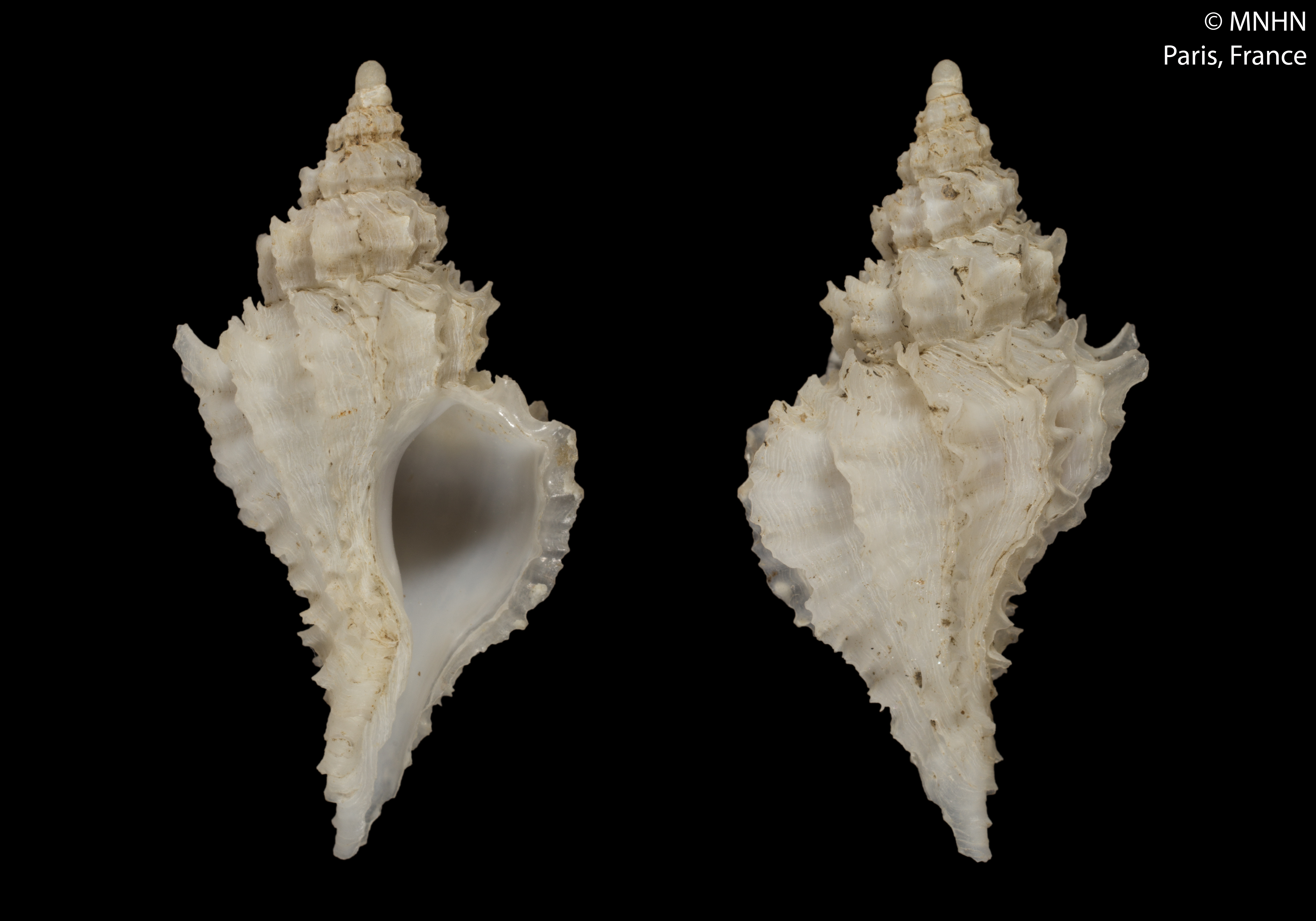
- Shell of Scabrotrophon regina (paratype at MNHN, Paris)

Scientific classification
- Kingdom: Animalia
- Phylum: Mollusca
- Class: Gastropoda
- Subclass: Caenogastropoda
- Order: Neogastropoda
- Family: Muricidae
- Genus: Scabrotrophon
- Species: S. regina

Binomial name
- Scabrotrophon regina (Houart, 1985)

Synonyms
- Nipponotrophon regina Houart, 1985

= Scabrotrophon regina =

Species of gastropod

Scabrotrophon regina is a species of sea snail, a marine gastropod mollusk in the family Muricidae, the murex snails or rock snails.

== Distribution ==
This marine species occurs off the Philippines.
