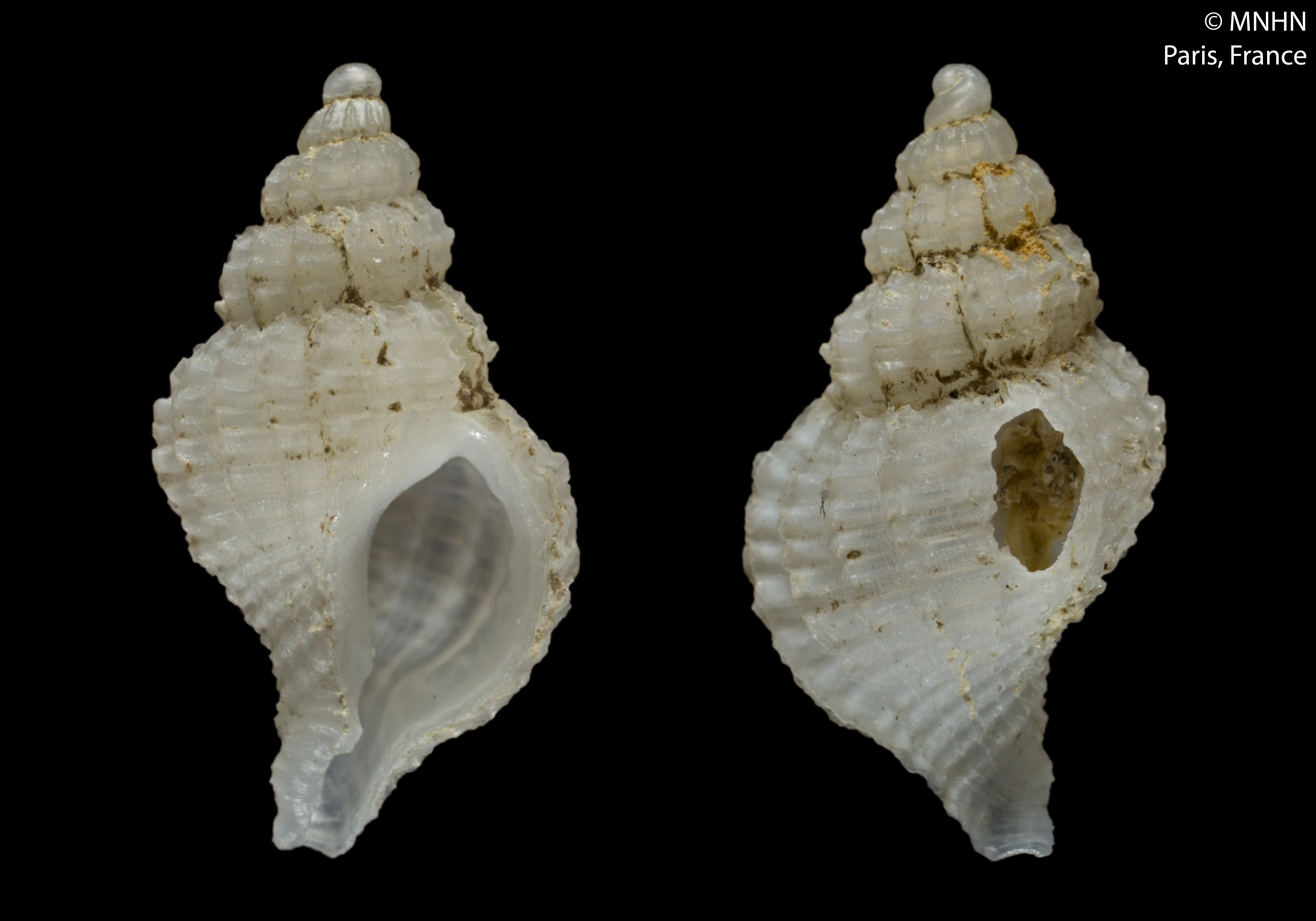
- Shell of Conchatalos samadiae

Scientific classification
- Kingdom: Animalia
- Phylum: Mollusca
- Class: Gastropoda
- Subclass: Caenogastropoda
- Order: Neogastropoda
- Superfamily: Muricoidea
- Family: Muricidae
- Subfamily: Trophoninae
- Genus: Conchatalos; Houart, 1995

Type species
- Trophon lacrima Houart, 1991

= Conchatalos =

Genus of gastropods

Conchatalos is a genus of sea snails, marine gastropod mollusks in the family Muricidae, the murex snails or rock snails.

== Species ==
Species within the genus Conchatalos include:

- Conchatalos canalibrevis Houart, 1995
- Conchatalos lacrima (Houart, 1991)
- Conchatalos samadiae Houart & Héros, 2016
- Conchatalos spinula Houart & Héros, 2008
- Conchatalos tirardi (Houart, 1991)
- Conchatalos vaubani Houart, 1995
