= Scabrotrophon lasius =

Scientific classification
- Kingdom: Animalia
- Phylum: Mollusca
- Class: Gastropoda
- Subclass: Caenogastropoda
- Order: Neogastropoda
- Family: Muricidae
- Genus: Scabrotrophon
- Species: S. lasius

Binomial name
- Scabrotrophon lasius (Dall, 1919)

Synonyms
- Neptunea (Trophonopsis) lasia Dall, 1919

Species of gastropod

Scabrotrophon lasius is a species of sea snail, a marine gastropod mollusk in the family Muricidae, the murex snails or rock snails.
