= Litozamia subtropicalis =

Scientific classification
- Kingdom: Animalia
- Phylum: Mollusca
- Class: Gastropoda
- Subclass: Caenogastropoda
- Order: Neogastropoda
- Family: Muricidae
- Genus: Litozamia
- Species: L. subtropicalis

Binomial name
- Litozamia subtropicalis (Iredale, 1913)

Synonyms
- Trophon subtropicalis Iredale, 1913

Species of gastropod

Litozamia subtropicalis is a species of sea snail, a marine gastropod mollusk in the family Muricidae, the murex snails or rock snails.
