= Litozamia longior =

Scientific classification
- Kingdom: Animalia
- Phylum: Mollusca
- Class: Gastropoda
- Subclass: Caenogastropoda
- Order: Neogastropoda
- Family: Muricidae
- Genus: Litozamia
- Species: L. longior

Binomial name
- Litozamia longior (Verco, 1909)

Synonyms
- Trophon longior Verco, 1909

Species of gastropod

Litozamia longior is a species of sea snail, a marine gastropod mollusk, in the family Muricidae, the murex snails or rock snails.
