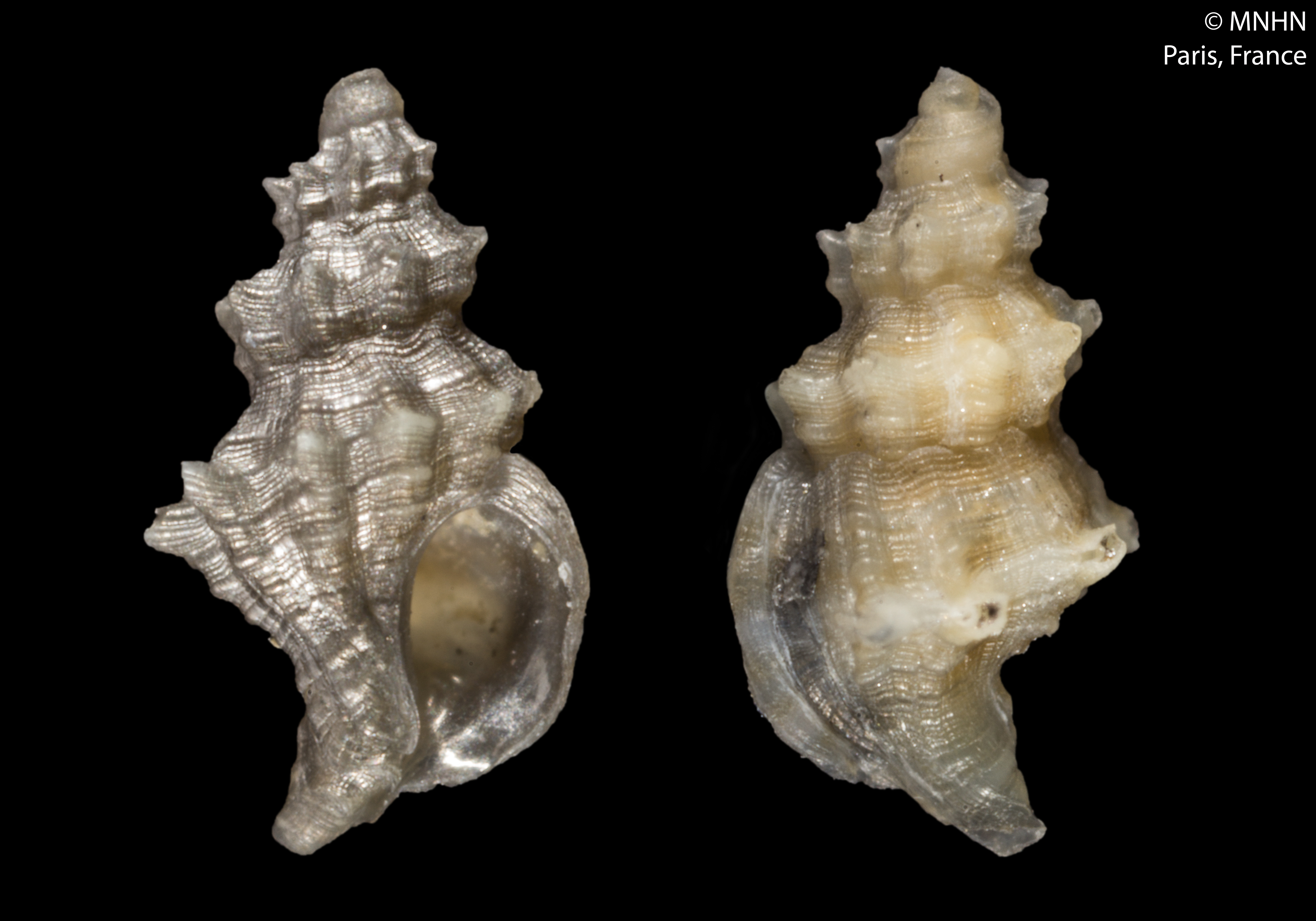
- Shell of Litozamia tropis (holotype at MNHN, Paris)

Scientific classification
- Kingdom: Animalia
- Phylum: Mollusca
- Class: Gastropoda
- Subclass: Caenogastropoda
- Order: Neogastropoda
- Family: Muricidae
- Genus: Litozamia
- Species: L. tropis

Binomial name
- Litozamia tropis Houart, 1995

= Litozamia tropis =

Species of gastropod

Litozamia tropis is a species of sea snail, a marine gastropod mollusk in the family Muricidae, the murex snails or rock snails.

== Description ==
The length of the shell attains 4.2 mm.

== Distribution ==
This marine species occurs off New Caledonia in the New Caledonian Exclusive Economic Zone at a depth of 110 m.
