= Tromina dispectata =

Scientific classification
- Kingdom: Animalia
- Phylum: Mollusca
- Class: Gastropoda
- Subclass: Caenogastropoda
- Order: Neogastropoda
- Family: Muricidae
- Genus: Tromina
- Species: T. dispectata

Binomial name
- Tromina dispectata Dell, 1990

Synonyms
- Fusus unicarinatus Philippi, 1868

Species of gastropod

Tromina dispectata is a species of sea snail, a marine gastropod mollusk in the family Muricidae, the murex snails or rock snails.
