= Scabrotrophon yurii =

Scientific classification
- Kingdom: Animalia
- Phylum: Mollusca
- Class: Gastropoda
- Subclass: Caenogastropoda
- Order: Neogastropoda
- Family: Muricidae
- Genus: Scabrotrophon
- Species: S. yurii

Binomial name
- Scabrotrophon yurii (Egorov, 1994)

Synonyms
- Trophonopsis yurii Egorov, 1994

Species of gastropod

Scabrotrophon yurii is a species of sea snail, a marine gastropod mollusk in the family Muricidae, the murex snails or rock snails.
