= Tromina =

Scientific classification
- Kingdom: Animalia
- Phylum: Mollusca
- Class: Gastropoda
- Subclass: Caenogastropoda
- Order: Neogastropoda
- Family: Muricidae
- Subfamily: Trophoninae
- Genus: Tromina; Dall, 1918

Genus of gastropods

Tromina is a genus of sea snails, marine gastropod mollusks in the family Muricidae, the murex snails or rock snails.

== Species ==
Species within the genus Tromina include:

- Tromina dispectata Dell, 1990
- Tromina traverseensis Clarke, 1961: synonym of Lusitromina traverseensis (A.H. Clarke, 1961)
