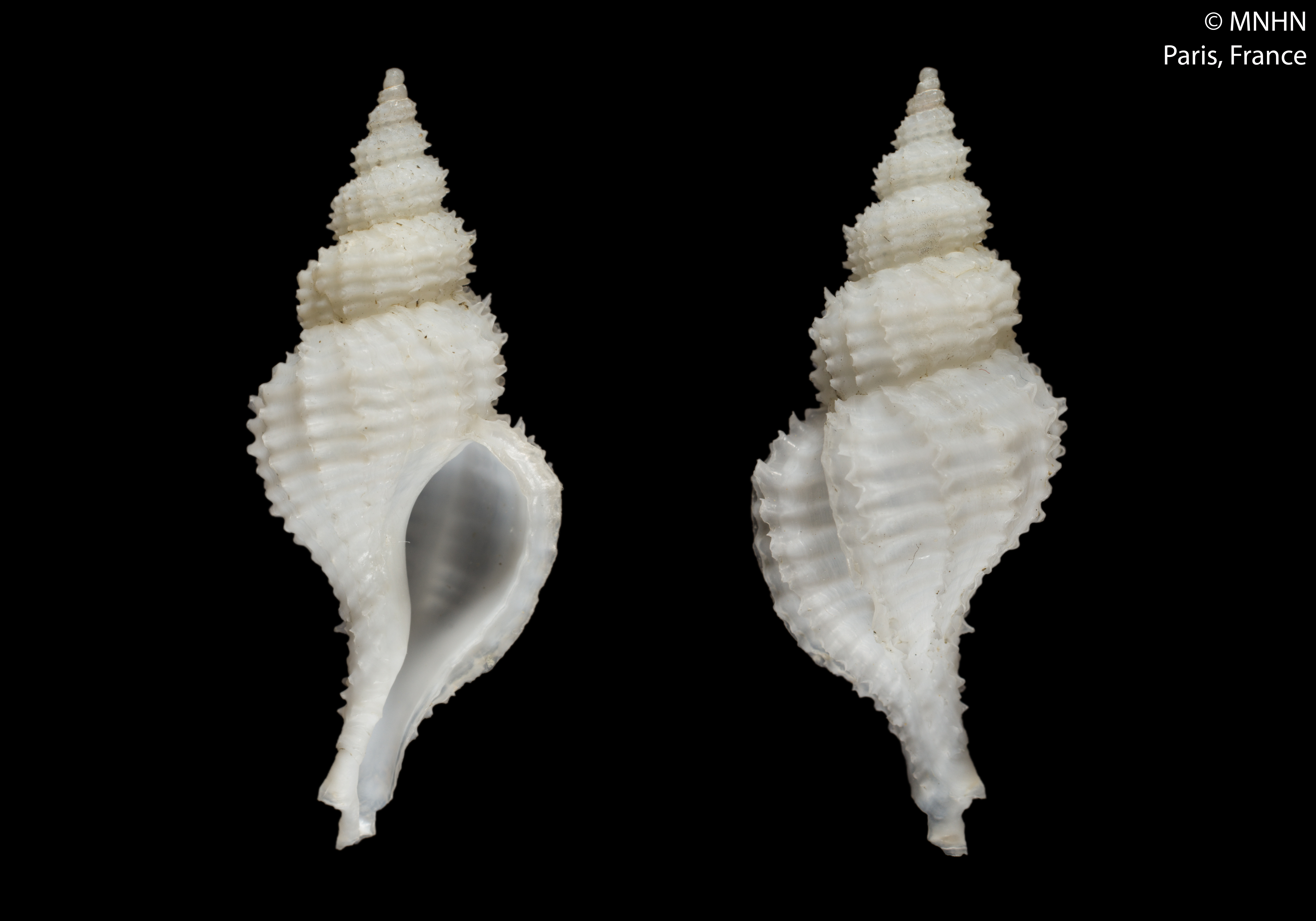
- Shell of Scabrotrophon chunfui (holotype at MNHN, Paris)

Scientific classification
- Kingdom: Animalia
- Phylum: Mollusca
- Class: Gastropoda
- Subclass: Caenogastropoda
- Order: Neogastropoda
- Family: Muricidae
- Genus: Scabrotrophon
- Species: S. chunfui

Binomial name
- Scabrotrophon chunfui Houart & Lan, 2001

Synonyms
- Nipponotrophon jungi Kin-Yang Lai, 2001

= Scabrotrophon chunfui =

Species of gastropod

Scabrotrophon chunfui is a species of sea snail, a marine gastropod mollusc in the family Muricidae, the murex snails or rock snails.

== Distribution ==
This marine species occurs off Taiwan.
