= Afritrophon agulhasensis =

Scientific classification
- Kingdom: Animalia
- Phylum: Mollusca
- Class: Gastropoda
- Subclass: Caenogastropoda
- Order: Neogastropoda
- Family: Muricidae
- Genus: Afritrophon
- Species: A. agulhasensis

Binomial name
- Afritrophon agulhasensis (Thiele, 1925)

Synonyms
- Trophon agulhasensis Thiele, 1925

Species of gastropod

Afritrophon agulhasensis is a species of sea snail, a marine gastropod mollusc in the family Muricidae, the murex snails or rock snails.
