= Minortrophon crassiliratus =

Scientific classification
- Kingdom: Animalia
- Phylum: Mollusca
- Class: Gastropoda
- Subclass: Caenogastropoda
- Order: Neogastropoda
- Family: Muricidae
- Genus: Minortrophon
- Species: M. crassiliratus

Binomial name
- Minortrophon crassiliratus (Suter, 1908)

Synonyms
- Daphnella crassilirata Suter, 1908

Species of gastropod

Minortrophon crassiliratus is a species of sea snail, a marine gastropod mollusc in the family Muricidae, the murex snails or rock snails.
