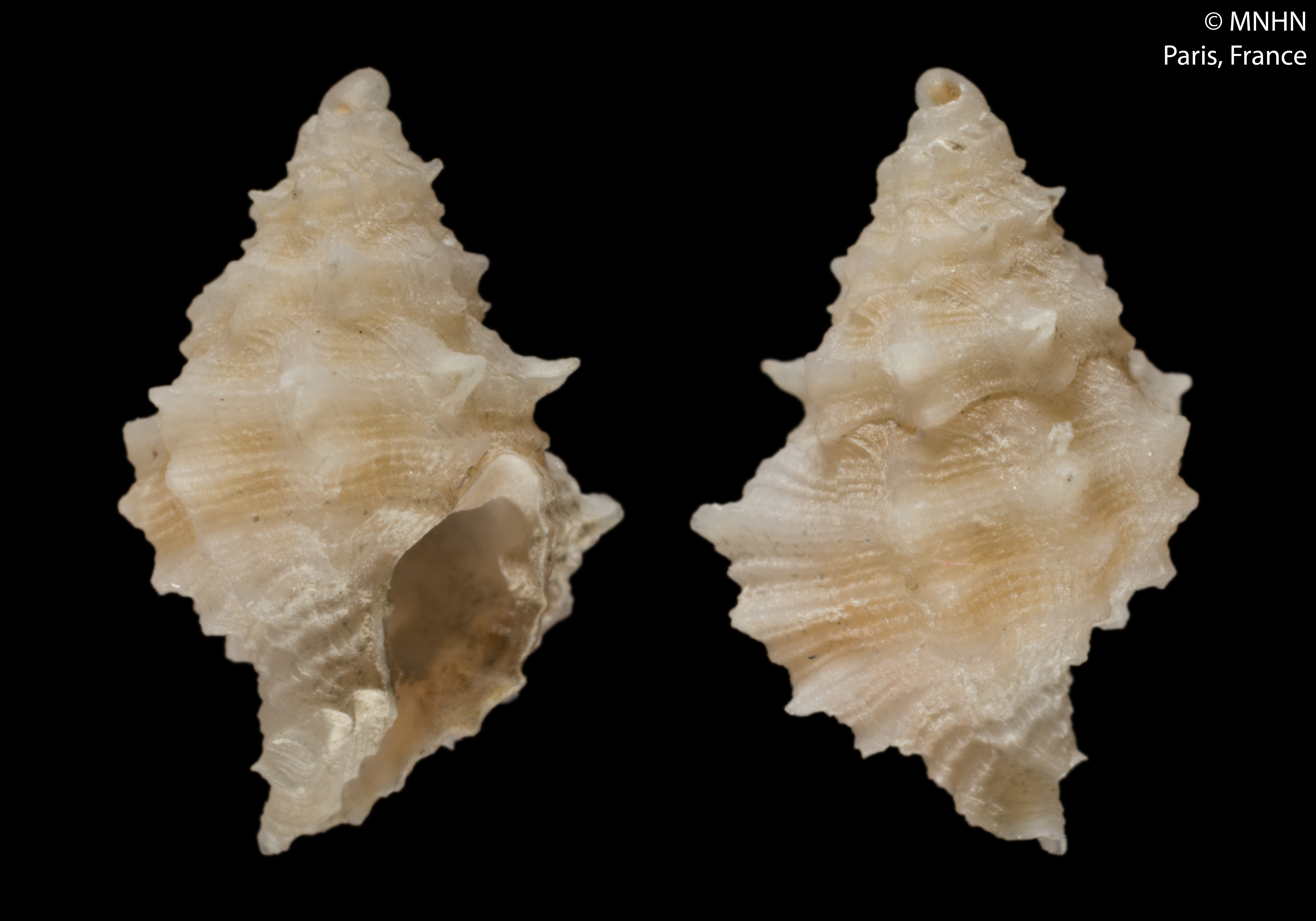
- Shell of Conchatalos spinula (holotype at MNHN, Paris)

Scientific classification
- Kingdom: Animalia
- Phylum: Mollusca
- Class: Gastropoda
- Subclass: Caenogastropoda
- Order: Neogastropoda
- Family: Muricidae
- Genus: Conchatalos
- Species: C. spinula

Binomial name
- Conchatalos spinula Houart & Héros, 2008

= Conchatalos spinula =

Species of gastropod

Conchatalos spinula is a species of sea snail, a marine gastropod mollusk in the family Muricidae, the murex snails or rock snails.

== Description ==
The length of the shell attains 6.7 mm.

== Distribution ==
This marine species occurs off the Fidji Islands.
