= Minortrophon priestleyi =

Scientific classification
- Kingdom: Animalia
- Phylum: Mollusca
- Class: Gastropoda
- Subclass: Caenogastropoda
- Order: Neogastropoda
- Family: Muricidae
- Genus: Minortrophon
- Species: M. priestleyi

Binomial name
- Minortrophon priestleyi (Hedley, 1916)

Synonyms
- Trophon priestleyi Hedley, 1916

Species of gastropod

Minortrophon priestleyi is a species of sea snail, a marine gastropod mollusc in the family Muricidae, the murex snails or rock snails.
