= Scabrotrophon maltzani =

Scientific classification
- Kingdom: Animalia
- Phylum: Mollusca
- Class: Gastropoda
- Subclass: Caenogastropoda
- Order: Neogastropoda
- Family: Muricidae
- Genus: Scabrotrophon
- Species: S. maltzani

Binomial name
- Scabrotrophon maltzani (Kobelt,1878)

Synonyms
- Trophon maltzani Kobelt,1878; Trophon subserratus Sowerby, 1880

Species of gastropod

Scabrotrophon maltzani is a species of sea snail, a marine gastropod mollusk in the family Muricidae, the murex snails or rock snails.
