= Afritrophon kowieensis =

Scientific classification
- Kingdom: Animalia
- Phylum: Mollusca
- Class: Gastropoda
- Subclass: Caenogastropoda
- Order: Neogastropoda
- Family: Muricidae
- Genus: Afritrophon
- Species: A. kowieensis

Binomial name
- Afritrophon kowieensis (Sowerby III, 1901)

Synonyms
- Trophon kowieensis Sowerby III, 1901

Species of gastropod

Afritrophon kowieensis is a species of sea snail, a marine gastropod mollusc in the family Muricidae, the murex snails or rock snails.

== Description ==
Small snail (6mm) typically found in waters around South Africa.
