= Fuegotrophon amettei =

Scientific classification
- Kingdom: Animalia
- Phylum: Mollusca
- Class: Gastropoda
- Subclass: Caenogastropoda
- Order: Neogastropoda
- Family: Muricidae
- Genus: Fuegotrophon
- Species: F. amettei

Binomial name
- Fuegotrophon amettei (Carcelles, 1946)

Synonyms
- Trophon amettei Carcelles, 1946

Species of gastropod

Fuegotrophon amettei is a species of sea snail, a marine gastropod mollusc in the family Muricidae, the murex snails or rock snails.
