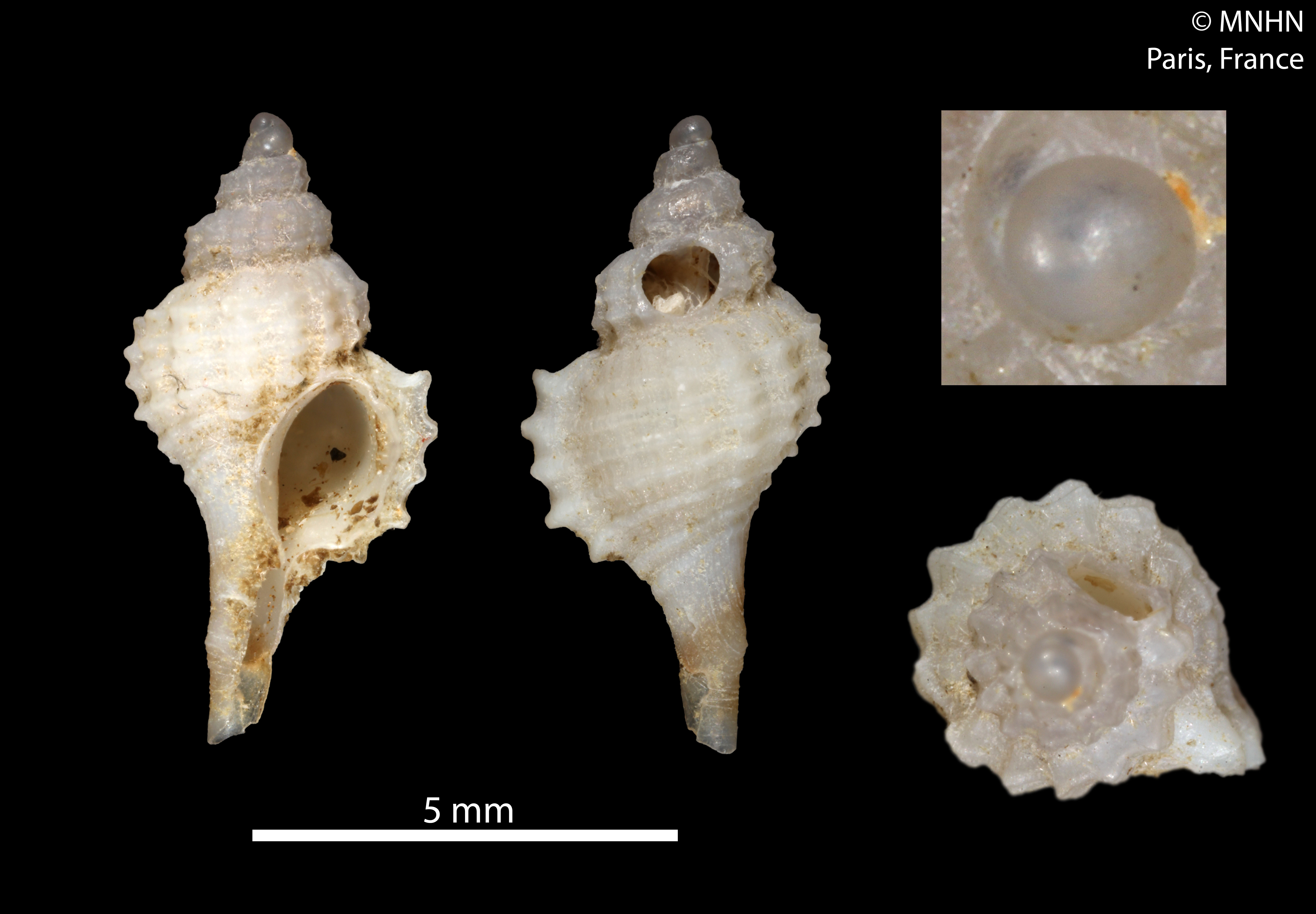
- Shell of Enatimene lanceolatus (paratype at MNHN, Paris)

Scientific classification
- Kingdom: Animalia
- Phylum: Mollusca
- Class: Gastropoda
- Subclass: Caenogastropoda
- Order: Neogastropoda
- Family: Muricidae
- Genus: Enatimene
- Species: E. lanceolatus

Binomial name
- Enatimene lanceolatus Houart, 2004

= Enatimene lanceolatus =

Species of gastropod

Enatimene lanceolatus is a species of sea snail, a marine gastropod mollusk in the family Muricidae, the murex snails or rock snails.

== Distribution ==
This marine species is endemic to Australia and occurs off Queensland.
