= Benthoxystus columnarius =

Scientific classification
- Kingdom: Animalia
- Phylum: Mollusca
- Class: Gastropoda
- Subclass: Caenogastropoda
- Order: Neogastropoda
- Family: Muricidae
- Genus: Benthoxystus
- Species: B. columnarius

Binomial name
- Benthoxystus columnarius (Hedley & May 1908)

Synonyms
- Trophon columnarius Hedley & May 1908

Species of gastropod

Benthoxystus columnarius is a species of sea snail, a marine gastropod mollusc in the family Muricidae, the murex snails or rock snails.
