= Litozamia brazieri =

Scientific classification
- Kingdom: Animalia
- Phylum: Mollusca
- Class: Gastropoda
- Subclass: Caenogastropoda
- Order: Neogastropoda
- Family: Muricidae
- Genus: Litozamia
- Species: L. brazieri

Binomial name
- Litozamia brazieri (Tenison Woods, 1876)

Synonyms
- Trophon brazieri Tenison Woods, 1876

Species of gastropod

Litozamia brazieri is a species of sea snail, a marine gastropod mollusk in the family Muricidae, the murex snails or rock snails.
