= Afritrophon insignis =

Scientific classification
- Kingdom: Animalia
- Phylum: Mollusca
- Class: Gastropoda
- Subclass: Caenogastropoda
- Order: Neogastropoda
- Family: Muricidae
- Genus: Afritrophon
- Species: A. insignis

Binomial name
- Afritrophon insignis (Sowerby III, 1900)

Synonyms
- Trophon insignis Sowerby III, 1900

Species of gastropod

Afritrophon insignis is a species of sea snail, a marine gastropod mollusc in the family Muricidae, the murex snails or rock snails.
