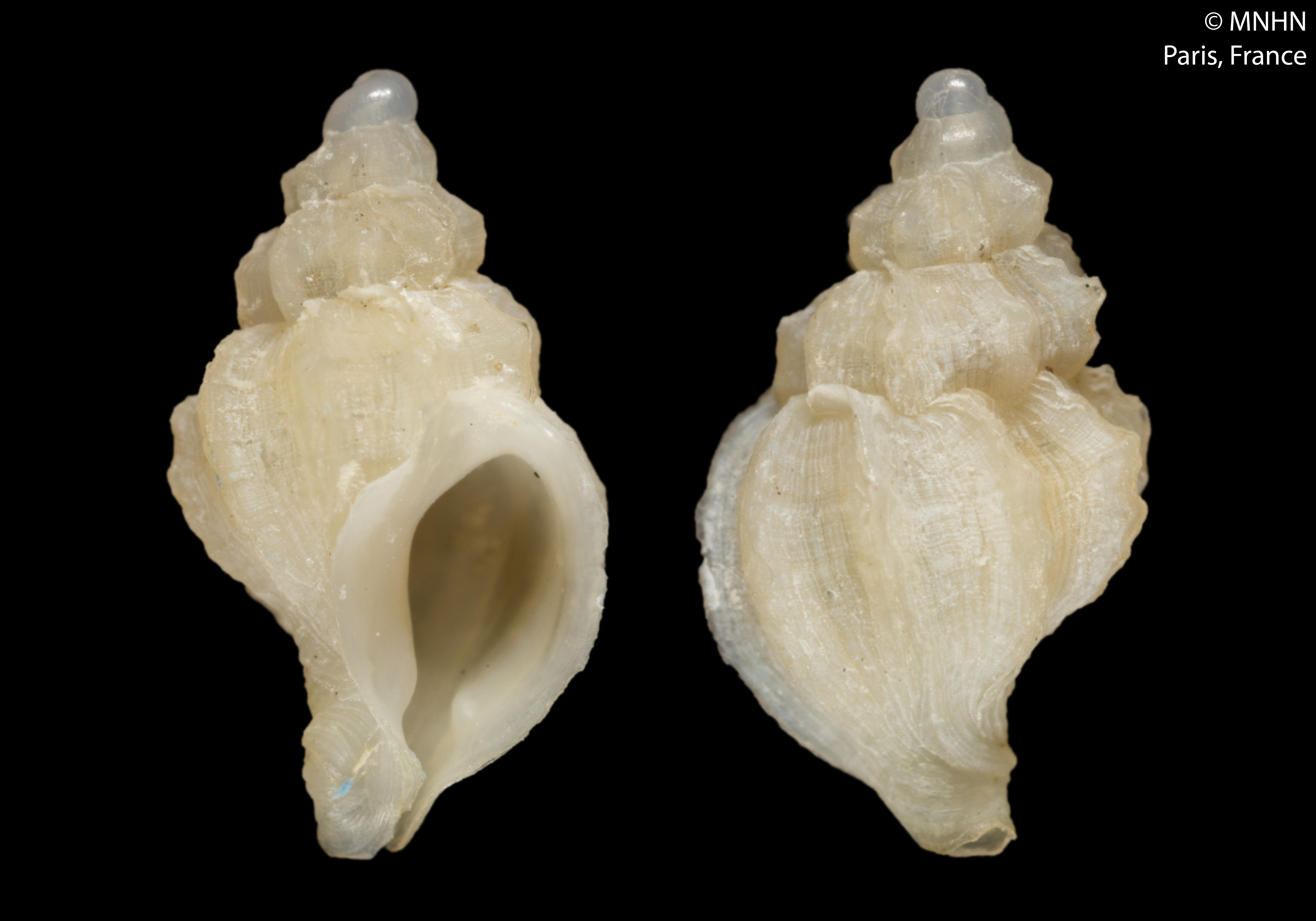

Scientific classification
- Kingdom: Animalia
- Phylum: Mollusca
- Class: Gastropoda
- Subclass: Caenogastropoda
- Order: Neogastropoda
- Family: Muricidae
- Genus: Conchatalos
- Species: C. canalibrevis

Binomial name
- Conchatalos canalibrevis Houart, 1995

= Conchatalos canalibrevis =

Species of gastropod

Conchatalos canalibrevis is a species of sea snail, a marine gastropod mollusk in the family Muricidae, the murex snails or rock snails.
