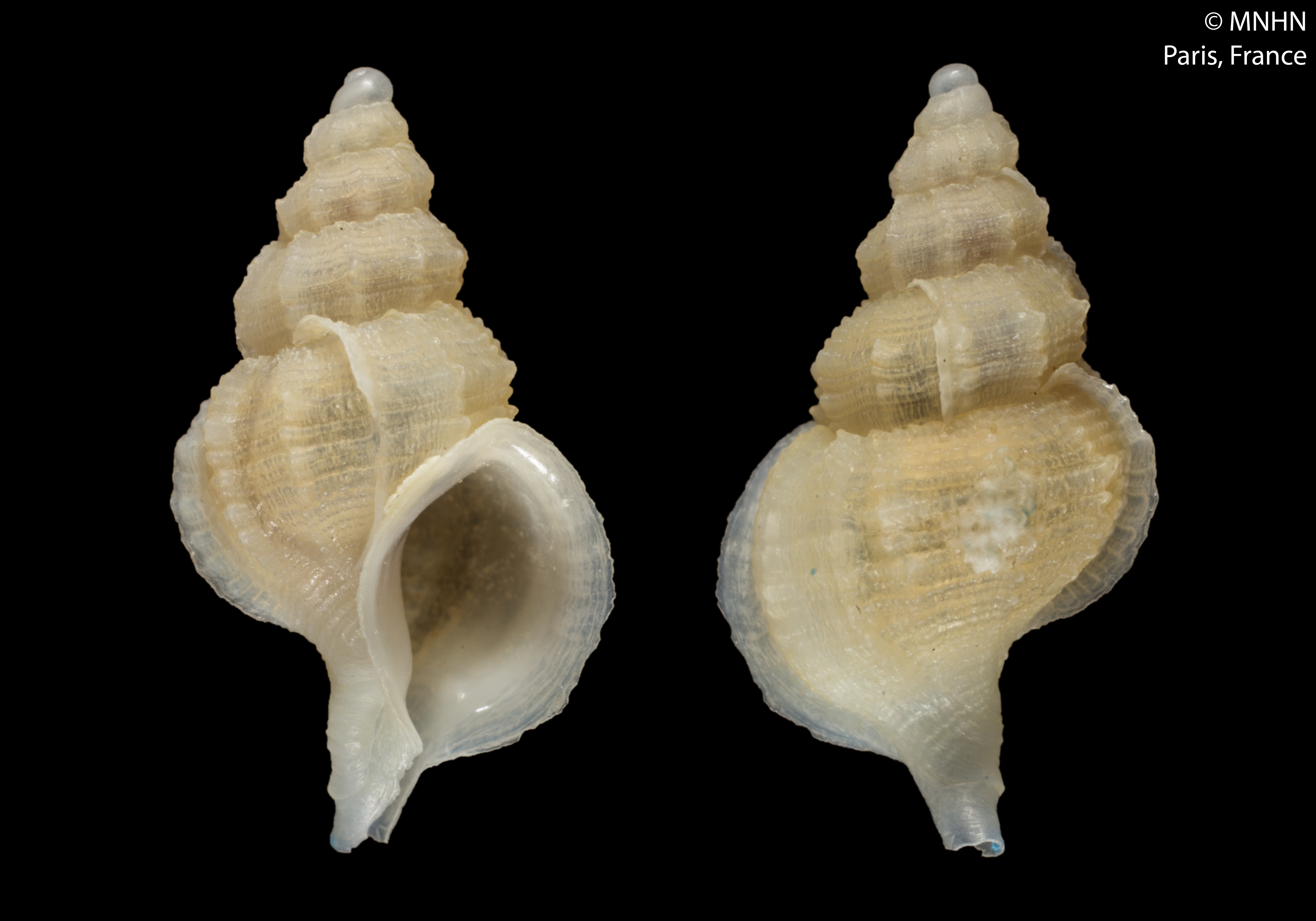
- Shell of Conchatalos tirardi (paratype at MNHN, Paris)

Scientific classification
- Kingdom: Animalia
- Phylum: Mollusca
- Class: Gastropoda
- Subclass: Caenogastropoda
- Order: Neogastropoda
- Family: Muricidae
- Genus: Conchatalos
- Species: C. tirardi

Binomial name
- Conchatalos tirardi (Houart, 1991)

Synonyms
- Trophon tirardi Houart, 1991

= Conchatalos tirardi =

Species of gastropod

Conchatalos tirardi is a species of sea snail, a marine gastropod mollusc in the family Muricidae, the murex snails or rock snails.

== Description ==
This marine species occurs off New Caledonia.
