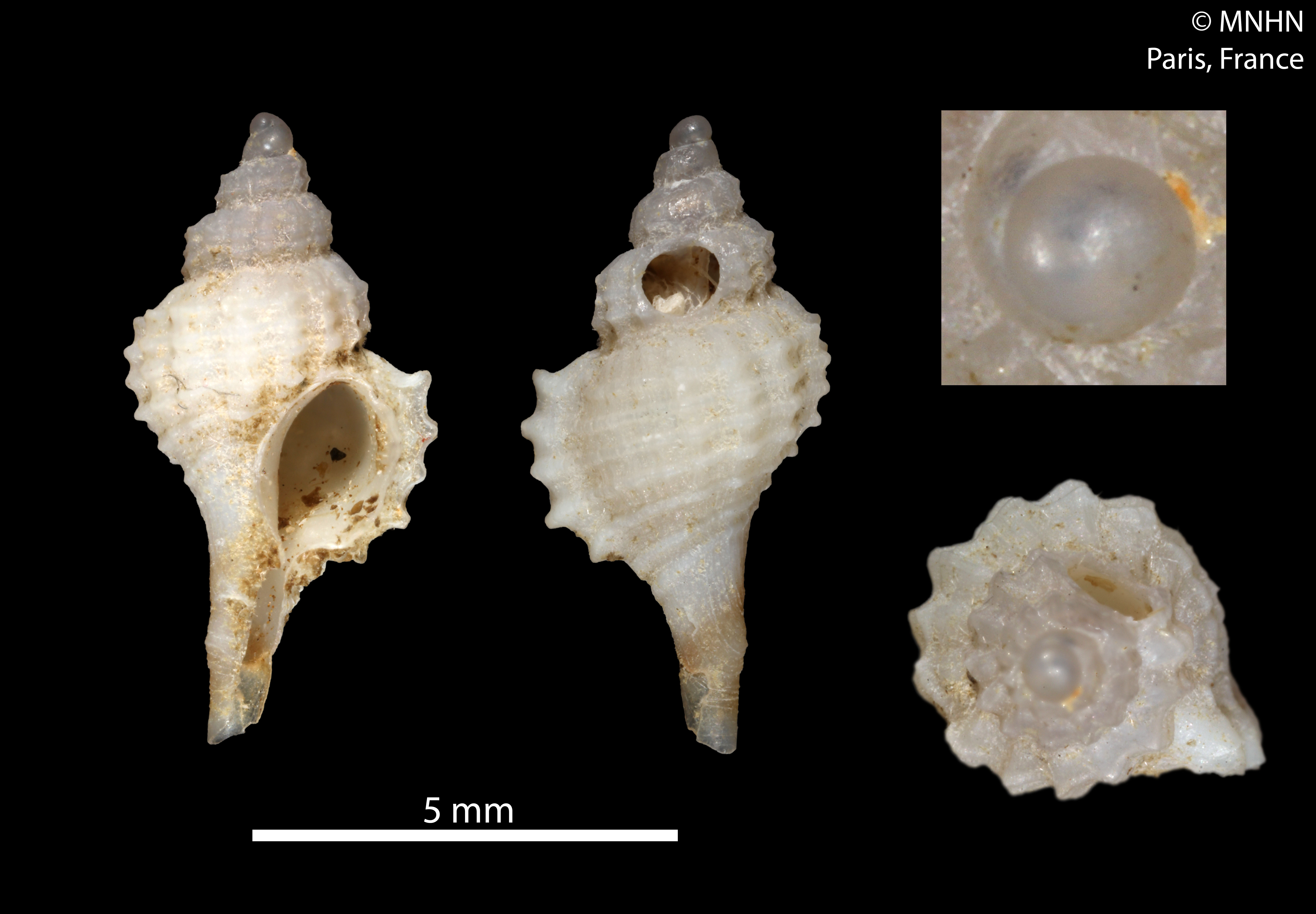
- Shell of Enatimene lanceolatus

Scientific classification
- Kingdom: Animalia
- Phylum: Mollusca
- Class: Gastropoda
- Subclass: Caenogastropoda
- Order: Neogastropoda
- Superfamily: Muricoidea
- Family: Muricidae
- Subfamily: Trophoninae
- Genus: Enatimene; Iredale, 1929

Type species
- Trophon simplex Hedley, 1903

= Enatimene =

Genus of gastropods

Enatimene is a genus of sea snails, marine gastropod mollusks in the family Muricidae, the murex snails or rock snails.

== Species ==
Species within the genus Enatimene include:

- Enatimene bassetti (Houart, 1998)
- Enatimene lanceolatus Houart, 2004
- Enatimene simplex (Hedley, 1903)
