= Scabrotrophon bondarevi =

Scientific classification
- Kingdom: Animalia
- Phylum: Mollusca
- Class: Gastropoda
- Subclass: Caenogastropoda
- Order: Neogastropoda
- Family: Muricidae
- Genus: Scabrotrophon
- Species: S. bondarevi

Binomial name
- Scabrotrophon bondarevi (Houart, 1995)

Synonyms
- Nipponotrophon bondarevi Houart, 1995

Species of gastropod

Scabrotrophon bondarevi is a species of sea snail, a marine gastropod mollusk in the family Muricidae, the murex snails or rock snails.
