= Marine Biology (journal) =

Peer-reviewed scientific journal

- Discipline: Marine biology
- Language: English
- Edited by: Ulrich Sommer

Publication details
- History: 1967–present
- Publisher: Springer Science+Business Media
- Frequency: Monthly
- Open access: Hybrid
- Impact factor: 2.391 (2014)

Standard abbreviations
- ISO 4: Mar. Biol.

Indexing
- CODEN: MBIOAJ
- ISSN: 0025-3162 (print); 1432-1793 (web)
- LCCN: 70011281
- OCLC no.: 299662112

Links
- Journal homepage

Marine Biology is a peer-reviewed scientific journal covering research on all aspects of marine biology. The journal was established in 1967 and is published monthly by Springer Science+Business Media. The editor-in-chief is Ulrich Sommer (Helmholtz Centre for Ocean Research). According to the Journal Citation Reports, the journal has a 2014 impact factor of 2.391.
