= Aleksandr Nikolaevich Golikov =

Aleksandr Nikolayevich Golikov
- Born: 29 December 1931; Leningrad, Soviet Union
- Died: 18 January 2010 (aged 78); Saint Petersburg, Russia
- Citizenship: Soviet Union → Russia
- Education: Leningrad State University
- Known for: Malacology, oceanography
- Scientific career
- Fields: Zoology, biogeography
- Workplaces: Zoological Institute of the Academy of Sciences of the USSR
- Thesis: (1963)
- Academic advisors: Vladimir Ivanovich Zhadin

Aleksandr Nikolayevich Golikov (29 December 1931 – 18 January 2010) was a Soviet and Russian malacologist and hydrobiologist. He was an expert in the taxonomy and ecology of molluscs and developed an original method for quantitatively surveying benthic fauna using lightweight diving equipment. He worked at the Zoological Institute of the Academy of Sciences of the USSR (now the Russian Academy of Sciences), where he headed the Laboratory of Marine Research from 1965 to 1992. He received a Doctor of Sciences degree in biological sciences in 1981 and became a professor in 1984.

== Biography ==
Golikov was born in 1931 in Leningrad to physiologist and Leningrad State University lecturer Nikolai Vasilyevich Golikov (1905–1988) and Elena Aleksandrovna Golikova (née Kirchner; 1909–1942), who died during the Siege of Leningrad. In 1942, he was evacuated to Saratov with his father and elder sister Margarita. The family returned to Leningrad in spring 1944. Golikov graduated from secondary school No. 232 in 1950 and entered the biology and soil science faculty of Leningrad State University. During his school years he practiced boxing and became Leningrad junior champion in 1949–1950.

From his second year at the biology and soil science faculty, he specialized in the Department of Ichthyology and Hydrobiology. During the summers of 1953 and the winter of 1954, he undertook practical training at the Murmansk Biological Station in Dalnie Zelentsy, studying adaptations of gastropods of the intertidal zone of the Barents Sea. In summer 1954, he participated in an expedition of the Knipovich Polar Research Institute of Marine Fisheries and Oceanography to the Norwegian Sea to study the Faroe–Shetland Channel. The material collected from the area formed the basis of his diploma thesis, which he defended in 1955; its subject was "Fauna of the southwestern coast of Iceland, the Faroe Islands and the Shetland Islands".

After graduating from university, Golikov entered postgraduate study at the Zoological Institute of the Academy of Sciences of the USSR, where he continued to work until his retirement. He became a staff member in 1959. During his postgraduate years he practiced weightlifting and trained in diving. In 1963 he obtained professional diver certification. He personally carried out underwater fieldwork beginning with the Zoological Institute's first lightweight-diving expedition, to Posyet Bay, in 1962. He received the degree of Candidate of Biological Sciences in 1963 for his dissertation "Gastropods of the genus Neptunea Bolten".

From December 1965, Golikov headed the Laboratory of Marine Research. In 1992 he became a chief research scientist, a position he held until 2003. He received the degree of Doctor of Biological Sciences in 1981 for his dissertation "Molluscs of Buccininae of the World Ocean".

Golikov also taught at the Department of Ichthyology and Hydrobiology of Leningrad State University and at other institutions of higher education. He supervised 15 Candidate of Sciences dissertations. He was a member of the National Committee of Soviet Biologists for thalassobiology and of the Central Council of the All-Union Hydrobiological Society of the Academy of Sciences of the USSR. He also served on the editorial board of the international journal Malacologia.

=== Family ===
His wife was Nina Liverievna Tsvetkova (1932–2010), a researcher at the Laboratory of Marine Research of the Zoological Institute of the Academy of Sciences of the USSR (RAS) and a specialist in amphipods. Their son, Alexey Aleksandrovich Golikov (1959–2017), worked at the Zoological Institute and specialized in amphipods.

=== Death ===
Golikov died at the age of 78 after a serious illness. He was buried at the Northern Cemetery in Saint Petersburg.

== Scientific work ==
Golikov was best known as a malacological systematist and researcher of benthic faunal complexes in the seas of the Soviet Union. He authored two monographs on gastropods of the family Buccinidae. Together with Yaroslav Igorevich Starobogatov, he worked on a classification of prosobranch gastropods, which they published in 1975. He described 146 new species of molluscs from Russian seas, out of approximately 1,000 known species, as well as several dozen taxa at the generic, familial and ordinal levels.

Together with Orest Aleksandrovich Scarlato, Golikov developed a method for quantitative surveys of benthic fauna using lightweight diving equipment. The method was based on a hierarchical sampling scheme in which large and rare species were surveyed over larger areas, while small and abundant species were surveyed using smaller samples. This became known as the "pyramidal system".

During the 1960s–1980s, Golikov organized and participated in numerous expeditions to the seas of the Russian Far East and Siberia, as well as to the Barents Sea and White Sea. He participated in Pacific expeditions aboard research and fisheries research vessels, including the sixth voyage of the research vessel Dmitri Mendeleev to the southern Pacific Ocean. He led studies of seasonal changes in benthic fauna in Posyet Bay in the Sea of Japan, Yaryshnaya Bay in the Barents Sea, and various areas of the White Sea. Research in Posyet Bay and the White Sea included long-term monitoring. The expedition material was compiled and published under his editorship in ten thematic volumes in the series Researches of the Fauna of the Seas, as well as in articles in English-language journals including Marine Biology and Marine Ecology Progress Series.

He also studied speciation and biogeography, particularly the reconstruction of the stages in the formation of the Arctic fauna.

=== Publications ===
Golikov authored more than 260 publications, including several monographs.

- Golikov, A. N. (1963). Gastropods of the genus Neptunea Bolten. Fauna of the USSR, Molluscs, vol. 5, no. 2. Moscow–Leningrad: Academy of Sciences of the USSR. p. 217.
- Golikov, A. N.; Starobogatov, Y. I. (1975). "Systematics of prosobranch gastopods". Malacologia. 15: 185–232.
- Golikov, A. N.; Kusakin, O. G. (1978). Shell-bearing gastropods of the littoral zone of the seas of the USSR. Keys to the Fauna of the USSR, published by the Zoological Institute of the Academy of Sciences of the USSR. Leningrad: Nauka. p. 292.
- Volova, G. N.; Golikov, A. N.; Kusakin, O. G. (1979). Shell-bearing gastropods of Peter the Great Bay. Vladivostok: Academy of Sciences of the USSR. p. 170.
- Golikov, A. N. (1980). Molluscs of Buccininae of the World Ocean. Fauna of the USSR, Molluscs, vol. 5, no. 2. Leningrad: Nauka.
- Babkov, A. I.; Golikov, A. N. (1984). Hydrobiocomplexes of the White Sea. Leningrad: Zoological Institute of the Russian Academy of Sciences. p. 104.
- Golikov, A. N. (1987). "Class Gastropoda". In Starobogatov, Y. I.; Naumov, A. D. (eds.). Molluscs of the White Sea. Keys to the Fauna of the USSR. Leningrad: Nauka. pp. 41–204.
- Golikov, A. N. (1995). Gastropods of the Arctic Basin. Moscow: Colus.

== Legacy ==
Twenty species of invertebrates and one genus of gastropods, Golikovia, were named in honour of Golikov. The genus is currently considered a synonym of the genus Neptunea.

The Department of Animal Physiology at the Faculty of Veterinary Medicine of the Moscow State Academy of Veterinary Medicine and Biotechnology is named after him.

== Awards ==
- Medal "In Commemoration of the 250th Anniversary of Leningrad" (1957)
- Medal "For Valiant Labour, in Commemoration of the 100th Anniversary of the Birth of Vladimir Lenin" (1970)
- Medal "For Labour Distinction" (1982)
