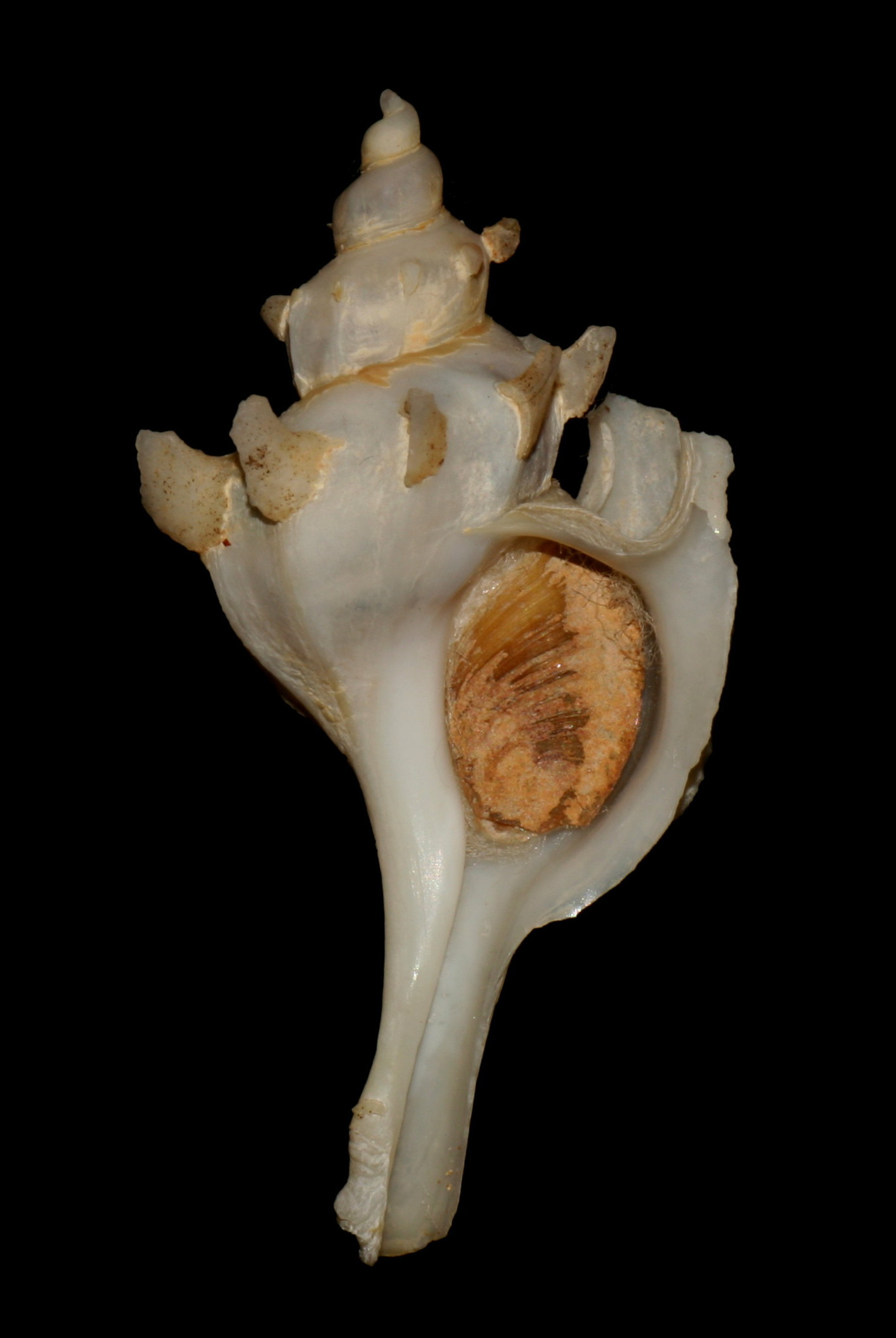

Scientific classification
- Kingdom: Animalia
- Phylum: Mollusca
- Class: Gastropoda
- Subclass: Caenogastropoda
- Order: Neogastropoda
- Superfamily: Muricoidea
- Family: Muricidae
- Subfamily: Trophoninae; Cossmann, 1903

Genera
- See text

= Trophoninae =

Subfamily of gastropods

Trophoninae is a subfamily of predatory sea snails, marine gastropod mollusks in the family Muricidae, the rock snails and their allies.

== Genera ==
According to the World Register of Marine Species, genera within the subfamily Trophoninae include:

- Afritrophon Tomlin, 1947
- Anatrophon Iredale, 1929
- Benthoxystus Iredale, 1929
- Conchatalos Houart, 1995
- Coronium Simone, 1996
- Enatimene Iredale, 1929
- Fuegotrophon Powell, 1951
- Gemixystus Iredale, 1929
- Leptotrophon Houart, 1995
- Litozamia Iredale, 1929
- Minortrophon Finlay, 1926
- Nipponotrophon Kuroda & Habe, 1971
- Nodulotrophon Habe & Ito, 1965
- Scabrotrophon McLean, 1996
- Tromina Dall, 1918
- Trophon Montfort, 1810
- Warenia Houart, Vermeij & Wiedrick, 2019
- Xenotrophon Iredale, 1929
