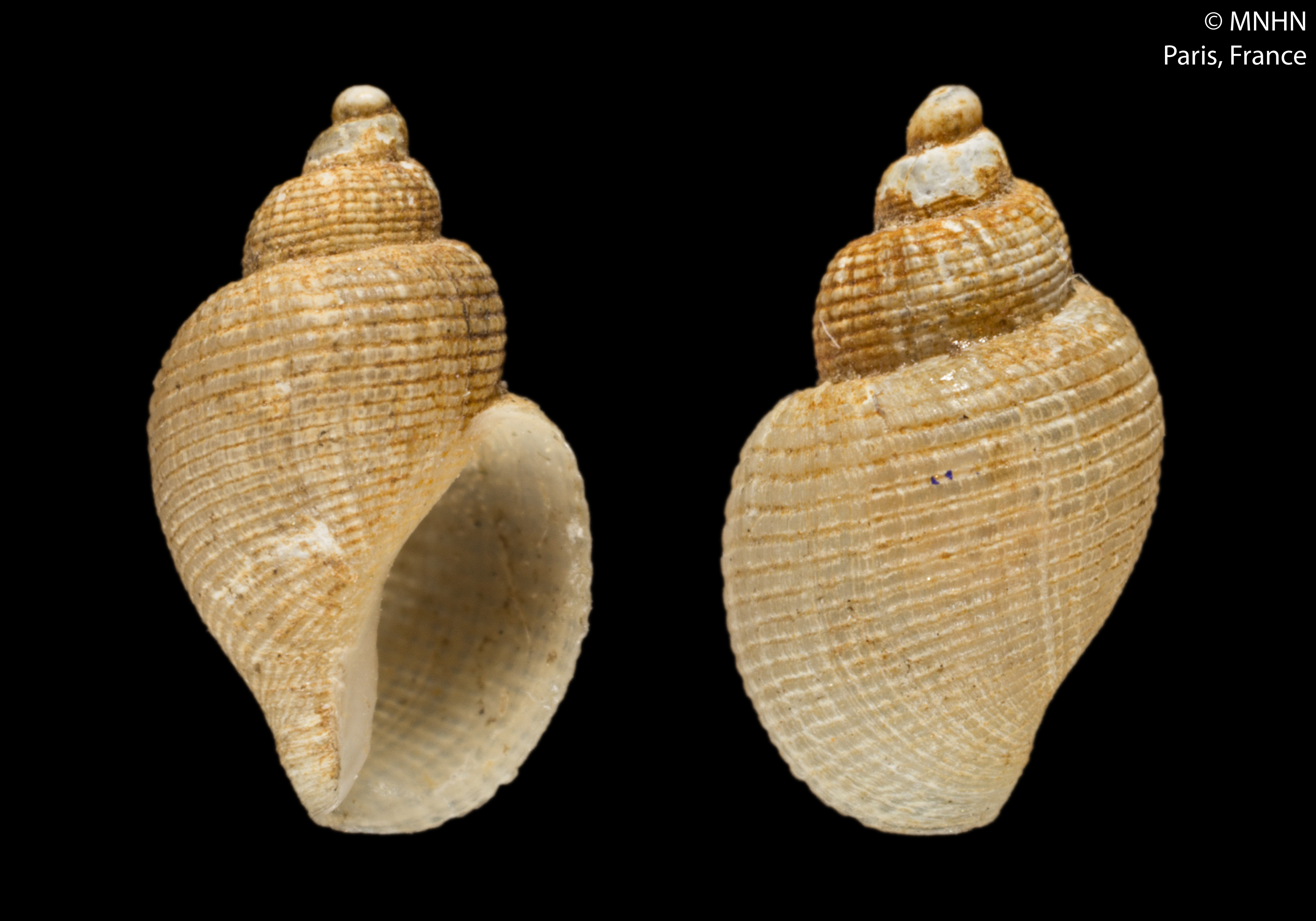
- Shell of Admete frigida

Scientific classification
- Kingdom: Animalia
- Phylum: Mollusca
- Class: Gastropoda
- Subclass: Caenogastropoda
- Order: Neogastropoda
- Superfamily: Volutoidea
- Family: Cancellariidae
- Subfamily: Admetinae
- Genus: Admete; Krøyer, 1842

Type species
- Admete crispa Möller, H.P.C., 1842

Species
- See text

Synonyms
- Cancellaria (Admete) Krøyer, 1842

= Admete (gastropod) =

Genus of gastropods

Admete is a genus of medium-sized sea snails, marine gastropod molluscs in the subfamily Admetinae of the family Cancellariidae, the nutmeg snails.

== Characteristics ==
The shell is oval, thin, diaphanous and is covered by an epidermis. Its spire is sharp. The body whorl exhibits a slight ventricose shape. The aperture is oval, with a gentle sinuation at the front. The columella is obliquely truncate, with slight plications in the front. The outer lip is sharp.

== Species ==
According to the World Register of Marine Species (WoRMS), the following species with valid names are within the genus Admete :

- Admete bruuni Knudsen, 1964
- Admete californica (Dall, 1908) - California admete
- Admete choshiensis Shikama, 1962
- Admete clivicola Høisæter, 2011
- Admete contabulata Friele, 1879
- Admete enderbyensis Powell, 1958
- Admete frigida Rochebrune & Mabille, 1885
- Admete gracilior (Carpenter, 1869) - slender admete
- Admete haini Numanami, 1996
- Admete hukuiensis Nomura, 1940
- Admete magellanica (Strebel, 1905)
- Admete microsoma (Dall, 1908)
- Admete ovata E.A. Smith, 1875
- Admete philippii Ihering, 1907
- Admete sadko Gorbunov, 1946
- Admete schythei (Philippi, 1855)
- Admete solida (Aurivillius, 1885)
- Admete specularis (Watson, 1882)
- Admete tabulata Sowerby III, 1875
- Admete tenuissima Okutani & Fujikura, 2002
- Admete verenae Harasewych & Petit, 2011
- Admete viridula (Fabricius, 1780) - northern admete)
- Admete watanabei Shikama, 1962

Names that have become synonyms

- Admete aethiopica Thiele, 1925: synonym of Cancellicula aethiopica (Thiele, 1925)
- Admete ambigua Hutton, 1885: synonym of Leucotina casta (A. Adams, 1853)
- Admete antarctica (Strebel, 1908): synonym of Nothoadmete antarctica (Strebel, 1908)
- Admete arctica (Middendorff, 1849): synonym of Neoiphinoe arctica (Middendorff, 1849)
- Admete azorica Bouchet & Warén, 1985: synonym of Brocchinia azorica (Bouchet & Warén, 1985)
- Admete borealis A. Adams, 1855: synonym of Admete viridula (Fabricius, 1780)
- Admete cancellata Kobelt, 1887: synonym of Neadmete cancellata (Kobelt, 1887)
- Admete carinata (R. B. Watson, 1882): synonym of Zeadmete watsoni Petit, 1970
- Admete circumcincta (Dall, 1873): synonym of Neadmete circumcincta (Dall, 1873)
- Admete consobrina Powell, 1951: synonym of Nothoadmete consobrina (Powell, 1951)
- Admete cornidei Altimira, 1978: synonym of Bonellitia cornidei (Altimira, 1978)
- Admete couthouyi (Jay, 1839) - northern admete: synonym of Admete viridula (Fabricius, 1780)
- Admete crispa Møller, 1842: synonym of Admete viridula (Fabricius, 1780)
- Admete decapensis Barnard, 1960: synonym of Brocchinia decapensis (Barnard, 1960)
- Admete delicatula E.A. Smith, 1907: synonym of Nothoadmete delicatula (E.A. Smith, 1907)
- Admete distincta Leche, 1878: synonym of Admete viridula (Fabricius, 1780)
- Admete finlayi (Powell, 1940): synonym of Zeadmete finlayi Powell, 1940
- Admete globularis E.A. Smith, 1875: synonym of Microglyphis globularis (E. A. Smith, 1875) (original combination)
- Admete grandis Mørch, 1869: synonym of Admete viridula (Fabricius, 1780)
- Admete harpovoluta Powell, 1957: synonym of Nothoadmete harpovoluta (Powell, 1957) (original combination)
- Admete laevior Leche, 1878: synonym of Admete viridula (Fabricius, 1780)
- Admete limnaeaeformis E.A. Smith, 1879: synonym of Toledonia limnaeaeformis (E.A. Smith, 1879)
- Admete microscopica Dall, 1889: synonym of Microcancilla microscopica (Dall, 1889)
- Admete middendorffiana Dall, 1885 accepted as Admete viridula (Fabricius, 1780)
- Admete modesta (Carpenter, 1864): synonym of Neadmete modesta (Carpenter, 1864)
- Admete nodosa Verrill and Smith, 1885: synonym of Brocchinia nodosa (Verrill & S. Smith, 1885)
- Admete philippii Carcelles, 1950 accepted as Admete philippii Ihering, 1907
- Admete producta Sars, 1878: synonym of Admete viridula (Fabricius, 1780)
- Admete regina Dall, 1911 - noble admete: synonym of Admete solida (Aurivillius, 1885)
- Admete rhyssa Dall, 1919: synonym of Admete gracilior (Carpenter in Gabb, 1869)
- Admete seftoni Berry, 1956: synonym of Admete gracilior (Carpenter in Gabb, 1869)
- Admete stricta Hedley, 1907: synonym of Pepta stricta (Hedley, 1907)
- Admete unalashkensis (Dall, 1873): synonym of Neadmete unalashkensis (Dall, 1873)
- Admete undata Leche, 1878: synonym of Admete viridula (Fabricius, 1780)
- Admete undatocostata Verkrüzen, 1875: synonym of Admete viridula (Fabricius, 1780)
- Admete woodworthi Dall, 1905: synonym of Admete gracilior (Carpenter in Gabb, 1869)
