= I. alba =

I. alba may refer to:

- Ipomoea alba, the moonflower or moon vine, a flowering plant species native to tropical and subtropical regions of the New World, from northern Argentina to Mexico and Florida.
- Iphinopsis alba, a sea snail species

== See also ==
- Alba (disambiguation)
