= A. californica =

A. californica may refer to:

An abbreviation of a species name. In binomial nomenclature the name of a species is always the name of the genus to which the species belongs, followed by the species name (also called the species epithet). In A. californica the genus name has been abbreviated to A. and the species has been spelled out in full. In a document that uses this abbreviation it should always be clear from the context which genus name has been abbreviated.

Some of the most common uses of A. californica are:

- Acalypha californica, the California copperleaf or pringle three-seeded mercury, a flowering shrub species native to California
- Achlys californica, a plant species native to western North America
- Adelpha californica, the California sister, a butterfly species found in much of California and western Oregon to extreme southern Washington
- Admete californica, a sea snail species
- Adolphia californica, the California prickbush or spineshrub, a flowering shrub species native to Baja California and California
- Aesculus californica, the California buckeye or California horse-chestnut, a tree species endemic to California
- Amara californica, a beetle species
- Amorpha californica, the California false indigo, a flowering plant species native to California, Arizona and northern Baja California
- Anemopsis californica, the yerba mansa or lizard tail, a perennial flowering plant species native to southwestern North America
- Angelica californica, the California angelica, a plant species found in northern California
- Aphelocoma californica, the Western scrub-jay, a bird species native to western North America
- Aplysia californica, the California sea slug or California sea hare, a sea slug species
- Aralia californica, the elk clover, a large herb species native to California and southwestern Oregon
- Arctomecon californica, the California bearpoppy, Las Vegas bearpoppy, golden bearpoppy or yellow-flowered desert poppy, a plant species native to Nevada and in northwestern Arizona
- Aristida californica, the California threeawn and Mojave threeawn, a grass species native to the Sonoran and Mojave Deserts of northern Mexico and California and Arizona
- Aristolochia californica, the California pipevine or California Dutchman's-pipe, a plant species endemic to California
- Armina californica, a sea slug species found in the Eastern Pacific Ocean from Vancouver Island to Panama
- Artemisia californica, the California sagebrush, a shrub species native to California and Baja California
- Asclepias californica, the common name California milkweed, a plant species native to California and northern Baja California
- Aspidotis californica, the California lacefern, a fern species native to California and Baja California
- Atriplex californica, the California saltbush or California orache, a plant species native to coastal California and Baja California
- Autographa californica, the alfalfa looper, a moth species found from Southern British Columbia to Baja California and to Manitoba, South Dakota, Colorado and New Mexico

== See also ==
- List of Latin and Greek words commonly used in systematic names § C
