= Iphinopsis =

Scientific classification
- Kingdom: Animalia
- Phylum: Mollusca
- Class: Gastropoda
- Subclass: Caenogastropoda
- Order: Neogastropoda
- Superfamily: Volutoidea
- Family: Cancellariidae
- Genus: Iphinopsis; Dall, 1924

Type species
- Odostomia densestriata Garrett, 1873

Genus of gastropods

Iphinopsis is a genus of sea snails, marine gastropod mollusks in the family Cancellariidae, the nutmeg snails.

== Species ==
Species within the genus Iphinopsis include:

- Iphinopsis alba Bouchet & Warén, 1985
- Iphinopsis bathyalis (Okutani, 1964)
- Iphinopsis boucheti Okutani, Hashimoto & Sasaki, 2004
- Iphinopsis choshiensis (Habe, 1958)
- Iphinopsis fuscoapicata Bouchet & Warén, 1985
- Iphinopsis inflata (Friele, 1879)
- Iphinopsis kelseyi (Dall, 1908)
- Iphinopsis kulanda (Garrard, 1975)
- Iphinopsis nuda Dall, 1927
- Iphinopsis splendens Simone & Birman, 2006
- Iphinopsis traverseensis (A.H. Clarke, 1961)

Species brought into synonymy

- Iphinopsis euthymei (Barnard, 1960): synonym of Nothoadmete euthymei (Barnard, 1960)
- Iphinopsis kroyeri (Philippi, 1849): synonym of Neoiphinoe kroeyeri (Philippi, 1849)
