= N. japonica =

N. japonica may refer to:

- Neadmete japonica, a sea snail species
- Neoshirakia japonica, a plant species found in Japan and East Asian countries
- Nerita japonica, a sea snail species
- Ninox japonica, the Northern boobook, a bird species found in eastern Russia, North Korea, South Korea, northern and central China and Japan
- Nordstromia japonica, a moth species found in Japan and China
- Nuphar japonica, an aquatic plant species found in Japan

== See also ==
- Japonica (disambiguation)
