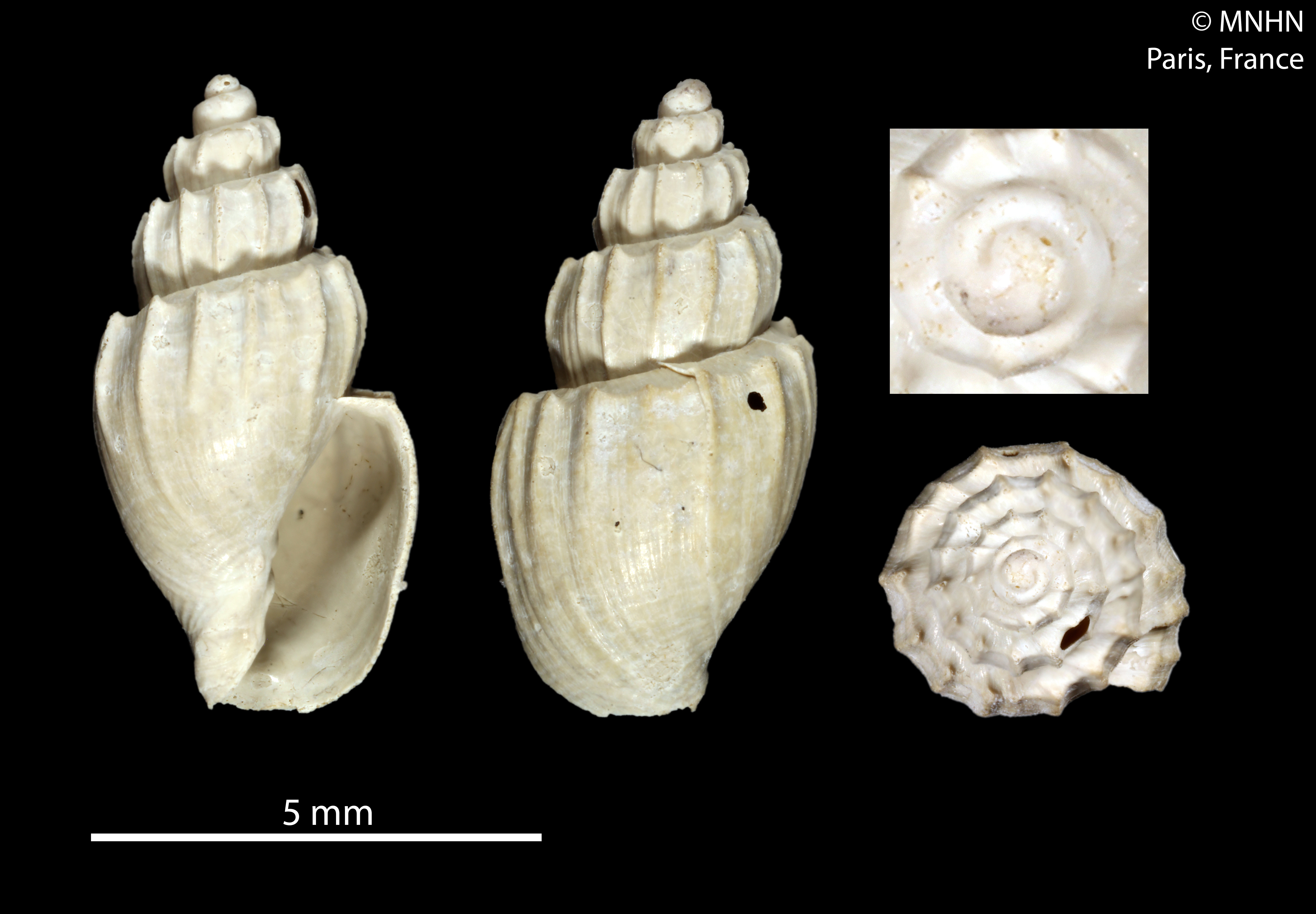
- Shell of Zeadmete apoensis

Scientific classification
- Kingdom: Animalia
- Phylum: Mollusca
- Class: Gastropoda
- Subclass: Caenogastropoda
- Order: Neogastropoda
- Superfamily: Volutoidea
- Family: Cancellariidae
- Genus: Zeadmete; Finlay, 1926

Type species
- Cancellaria trailli F. W. Hutton, 1873

Synonyms
- Oamaruia (Zeadmete) Finlay, 1926; Vercomaris Garrard, 1975

= Zeadmete =

Genus of gastropods

Zeadmete is a genus of sea snails, marine gastropod mollusks in the family Cancellariidae, the nutmeg snails.

== Species ==
Species within the genus Zeadmete include:

- Zeadmete apoensis Verhecken, 2011
- † Zeadmete araeostyla (P. A. Maxwell, 1988)
- Zeadmete atlantica Petit, L.D. Campbell & S.C. Campbell, 2010
- Zeadmete aupouria Powell, 1940
- Zeadmete barkeri Powell, 1952
- Zeadmete bathyomon Bouchet & Petit, 2008
- Zeadmete bilix Bouchet & Petit, 2008
- † Zeadmete concava (Marwick, 1931)
- † Zeadmete elegantula (Beu, 1970)
- Zeadmete finlayi Powell, 1940
- † Zeadmete gibbera (Marwick, 1931)
- † Zeadmete kumeroa C. A. Fleming, 1943
- † Zeadmete major (Marwick, 1965)
- † Zeadmete miocenica Finlay, 1930
- † Zeadmete nodus (Finlay, 1930)
- Zeadmete otagoensis Dell, 1956
- Zeadmete ovalis Dell, 1956
- Zeadmete pergradata (Verco, 1904)
- Zeadmete physomon Bouchet & Petit, 2008
- † Zeadmete pliocenica Finlay, 1930
- Zeadmete sikatunai Verhecken, 2011
- Zeadmete subantarctica Powell, 1933
- † Zeadmete teres Laws, 1940
- Zeadmete trailli (Hutton, 1873)
- Zeadmete verheckeni Petit & Harasewych, 2000
- Zeadmete watsoni Petit, 1970

Species brought into synonymy

- Zeadmete kulanda Garrard, 1975: synonym of Iphinopsis kulanda (Garrard, 1975)
