= Nothoadmete =

Scientific classification
- Kingdom: Animalia
- Phylum: Mollusca
- Class: Gastropoda
- Subclass: Caenogastropoda
- Order: Neogastropoda
- Superfamily: Volutoidea
- Family: Cancellariidae
- Genus: Nothoadmete; Oliver, 1982

Type species
- Nothoadmete tumida Oliver, 1982

Genus of gastropods

Nothoadmete is a genus of sea snails, marine gastropod mollusks in the family Cancellariidae, the nutmeg snails.

== Species ==
Species within the genus Nothoadmete include:

- Nothoadmete antarctica (Strebel, 1908)
- Nothoadmete consobrina (Powell, 1951)
- Nothoadmete delicatula (E.A. Smith, 1907)
- Nothoadmete euthymei (Barnard, 1960)
- Nothoadmete harpovoluta (Powell, 1957)
- Nothoadmete tumida Oliver, 1982
