= Iphinopsis kelseyi =

Scientific classification
- Kingdom: Animalia
- Phylum: Mollusca
- Class: Gastropoda
- Subclass: Caenogastropoda
- Order: Neogastropoda
- Family: Cancellariidae
- Genus: Iphinopsis
- Species: I. kelseyi

Binomial name
- Iphinopsis kelseyi (Dall, 1908)

Synonyms
- Trichotropis kelseyi Dall, 1908

Species of gastropod

Iphinopsis kelseyi is a species of sea snail, a marine gastropod mollusk in the family Cancellariidae, the nutmeg snails.
