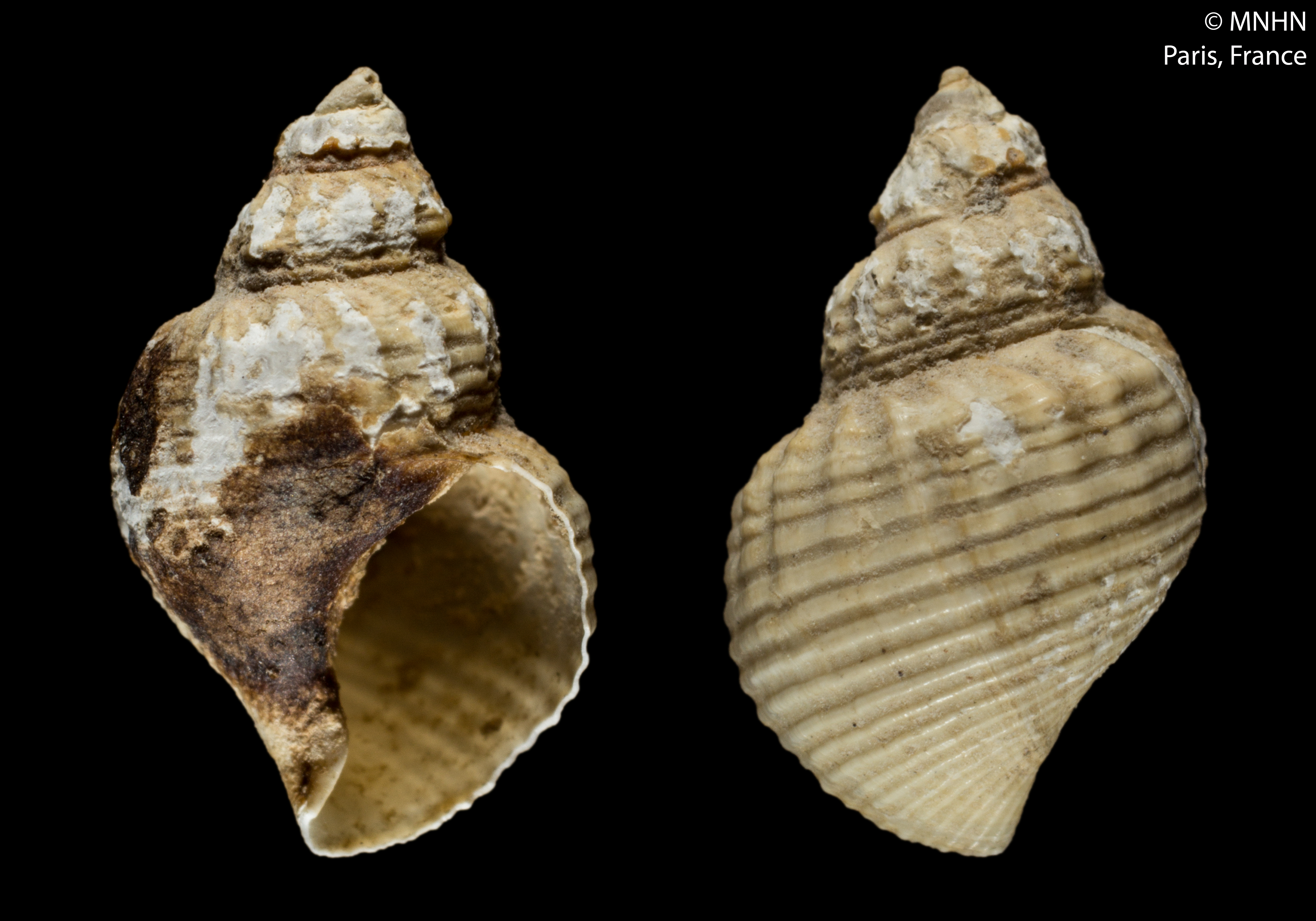
- Shell of Admete viridula undata (syntype at MNHN, Paris)

Scientific classification
- Kingdom: Animalia
- Phylum: Mollusca
- Class: Gastropoda
- Subclass: Caenogastropoda
- Order: Neogastropoda
- Family: Cancellariidae
- Subfamily: Admetinae
- Genus: Admete
- Species: A. viridula

Binomial name
- Admete viridula (Fabricius, 1780)
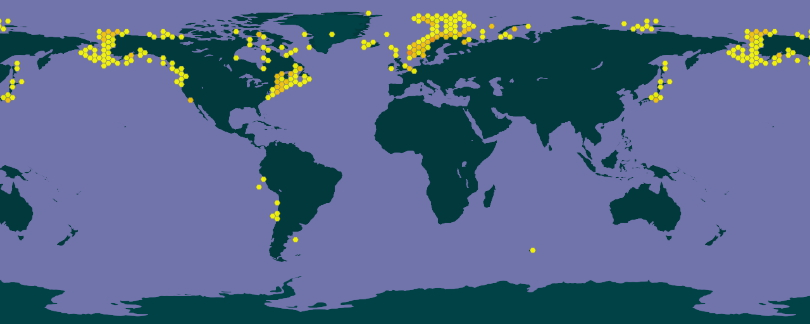

Synonyms
- Admete abnormis Harmer, 1918; Admete borealis A. Adams, 1855, Admete couthouyi (Jay, 1839); Admete crispa Møller, 1842; Admete distincta Leche, 1878; Admete grandis Mörch, 1869; Admete laevior Leche, 1878; Admete middendorffiana Dall, 1885; Admete producta Sars, 1878; Admete undata Leche, 1878; Admete undatocostata Verkrüzen, 1875 (dubious synonym); Admete viridula var. distincta Leche, 1878; Admete viridula var. elongata Leche, 1878; Admete viridula var. grandis Mörch, 1869; Admete viridula var. laevior Leche, 1878; Admete viridula var. producta (Fabricius, 1780); Admete viridula var. producta Sars G.O., 1878; Admete viridula var. undata Leche, 1878; Admete viridula var. ventricosa Friele, 1879; Cancellaria buccinoides Couthouy, 1838 (non-Sowerby, 1832) Invalid: junior homonym of Cancellaria buccinoides Sowerby, 1832); Cancellaria couthouyi Jay, 1839 (dubious synonym); Murex costellifer Sowerby J. de C., 1832 (dubious synonym); † Nematoma tomiyaensis iiokaensis Ozaki, 1958; Propebela viridula (Fabricius, 1780); Tritonium viridulum Fabricius, 1780 (basionym)

= Admete viridula =

Species of sea snail

Admete viridula is a species of sea snail, a marine gastropod mollusk in the family Cancellariidae, the nutmeg snails.

== Description ==
The shell size varies between 9 mm and 27 mm

(Described as Admete borealis; originally in Latin) The shell has an ovate-oblong shape. It is whitish, covered with a brownish-horn epidermis. It contains six convex whorls, the upper ones obscurely longitudinally plicated. The body whorl is ventricose, transversely grooved with somewhat distant grooves. The sutures are impressed. The aperture is oval, with a thin expanded outer lip. The simple columella is arcuate, slightly truncated anteriorly. The outer lip has a sharp margin and is internally simple.

== Distribution ==
This species is found in circumarctic waters (Greenland, Norway, Novaya Zemlya, Russia; Bering Strait, Alaska), in the northwest Atlantic Ocean and in the Gulf of Maine.
