= Neadmete nakayamai =

Scientific classification
- Kingdom: Animalia
- Phylum: Mollusca
- Class: Gastropoda
- Subclass: Caenogastropoda
- Order: Neogastropoda
- Family: Cancellariidae
- Genus: Neadmete
- Species: N. nakayamai

Binomial name
- Neadmete nakayamai Habe, 1961

Species of gastropod

Neadmete nakayamai is a species of sea snail, a marine gastropod mollusk in the family Cancellariidae, the nutmeg snails.
