= Iphinopsis boucheti =

Conservation status
- Critically Endangered (IUCN 3.1)

Scientific classification
- Kingdom: Animalia
- Phylum: Mollusca
- Class: Gastropoda
- Subclass: Caenogastropoda
- Order: Neogastropoda
- Family: Cancellariidae
- Genus: Iphinopsis
- Species: I. boucheti

Binomial name
- Iphinopsis boucheti Okutani, Hashimoto & Sasaki, 2004

Species of gastropod

Iphinopsis boucheti is a species of sea snail, a marine gastropod mollusk in the family Cancellariidae, the nutmeg snails.

The specific name boucheti is in honor of French malacologist Philippe Bouchet.

== Distribution ==
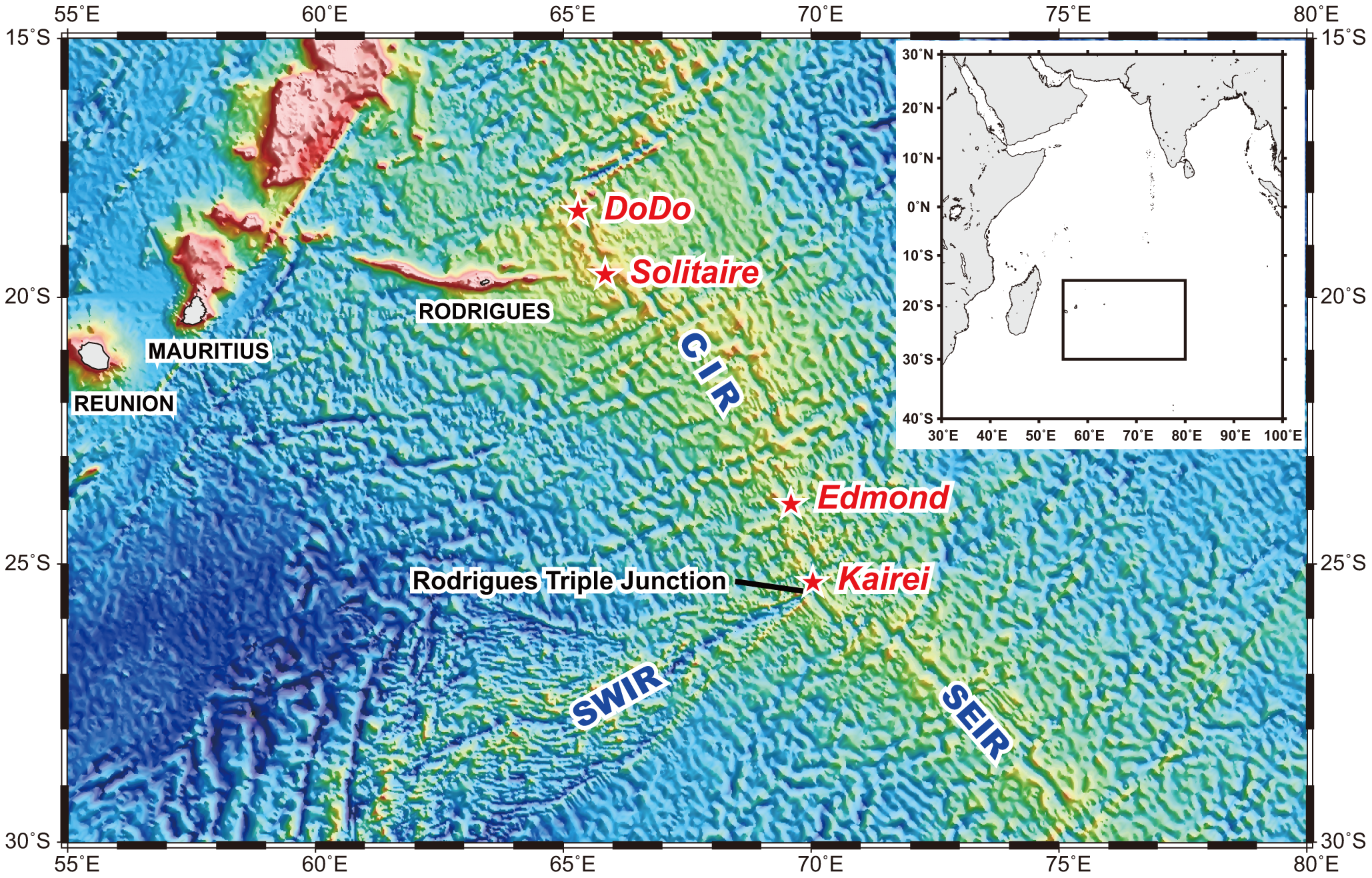
Map of southern part of the Central Indian Ridge (CIR) showing location of the Kairei hydrothermal vent site.

The type locality is the Kairei hydrothermal vent site on the Central Indian Ridge, just north of the Rodrigues Triple Point. It occurs in a distinct microhabitat of black smokers and sites of diffuse venting at a depth of 2424 to 2443 meters.

== Threats ==
Vent fields in the Indian Ocean seabed are of particular interest for exploration of polymetallic sulfide mineral resources. An exploration-phase license for the Triple Point region was granted by the International Seabed Authority (ISA) to the Federal Institute for Geosciences and Natural Resources of Germany under a 15-year contract, expiring in 2030. The license permits the extraction of mineral resources for technological and geological exploration purposes, yet even such restricted disturbances possess direct and indirect concerns to subpopulations of Iphinopsis boucheti. Habitat destruction through mineral extraction and the spread of sediment plumes from the agitation of vent fields and adjacent deposits have been cited as potential threats to this species.
