= Admete sadko =

Scientific classification
- Kingdom: Animalia
- Phylum: Mollusca
- Class: Gastropoda
- Subclass: Caenogastropoda
- Order: Neogastropoda
- Family: Cancellariidae
- Genus: Admete
- Species: A. sadko

Binomial name
- Admete sadko Gorbunov, 1946

Species of gastropod

Admete sadko is a species of sea snail, a marine gastropod mollusk in the family Cancellariidae, the nutmeg snails.

== Description ==
The length of the shell varies between 7 mm and 9 mm.

== Distribution ==
This species occurs in the Laptev Sea, Arctic Ocean.
