= Admete enderbyensis =

Scientific classification
- Kingdom: Animalia
- Phylum: Mollusca
- Class: Gastropoda
- Subclass: Caenogastropoda
- Order: Neogastropoda
- Family: Cancellariidae
- Subfamily: Admetinae
- Genus: Admete
- Species: A. enderbyensis

Binomial name
- Admete enderbyensis Powell, 1958
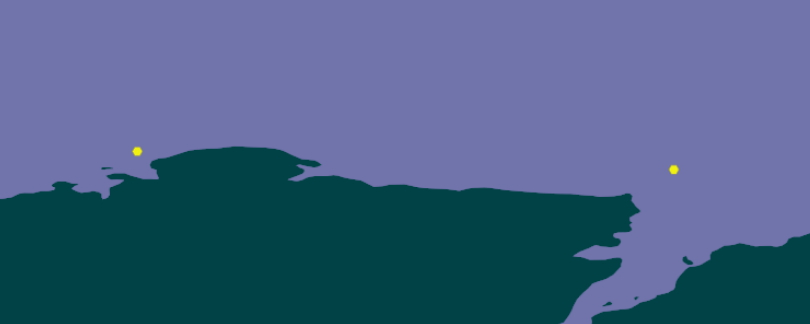

Species of gastropod

Admete enderbyensis is a species of sea snail, a marine gastropod mollusk in the family Cancellariidae, the nutmeg snails.

== Description ==
The shell grows to a length of 20 mm.

== Distribution ==
This marine species occurs off Enderby Land, Antarctica.
