= Iphinopsis bathyalis =

Scientific classification
- Kingdom: Animalia
- Phylum: Mollusca
- Class: Gastropoda
- Subclass: Caenogastropoda
- Order: Neogastropoda
- Family: Cancellariidae
- Genus: Iphinopsis
- Species: I. bathyalis

Binomial name
- Iphinopsis bathyalis (Okutani, 1964)

Synonyms
- Palaeadmete bathyalis Okutani, 1964

Species of gastropod

Iphinopsis bathyalis is a species of sea snail, a marine gastropod mollusk in the family Cancellariidae, the nutmeg snails.
