= Iphinopsis fuscoapicata =

Scientific classification
- Kingdom: Animalia
- Phylum: Mollusca
- Class: Gastropoda
- Subclass: Caenogastropoda
- Order: Neogastropoda
- Family: Cancellariidae
- Genus: Iphinopsis
- Species: I. fuscoapicata

Binomial name
- Iphinopsis fuscoapicata Bouchet & Warén, 1985

Species of gastropod

Iphinopsis fuscoapicata is a species of sea snail, a marine gastropod mollusk in the family Cancellariidae, the nutmeg snails.

== Description ==
Iphinopsis fuscoapicata is characterized by its slender, elongated shell, which is typically light in color with a brownish or dark apex. The shell often has a series of tightly coiled whorls, giving it a characteristic shape. It features distinct axial ribs that extend from the base to the apex, giving the shell a somewhat ridged texture. The length of the shell attains 8.9 mm.

== Distribution ==
This species occurs in the North Atlantic Ocean.
