= Iphinopsis choshiensis =

Scientific classification
- Kingdom: Animalia
- Phylum: Mollusca
- Class: Gastropoda
- Subclass: Caenogastropoda
- Order: Neogastropoda
- Family: Cancellariidae
- Genus: Iphinopsis
- Species: I. choshiensis

Binomial name
- Iphinopsis choshiensis (Habe, 1958)

Synonyms
- Iphinoella choshiensis Habe, 1958

Species of gastropod

Iphinopsis choshiensis is a species of sea snail, a marine gastropod mollusk in the family Cancellariidae, the nutmeg snails.

== Description ==
The shell size varies between 3 mm and 5 mm.

== Distribution ==
This species occurs in the seas off Japan.
