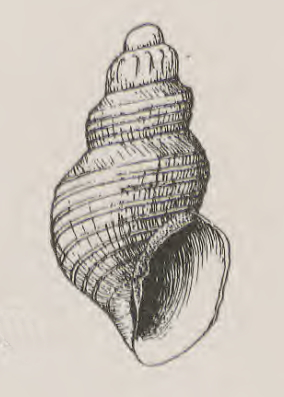
- Shell of Admete microsoma (holotype)

Scientific classification
- Kingdom: Animalia
- Phylum: Mollusca
- Class: Gastropoda
- Subclass: Caenogastropoda
- Order: Neogastropoda
- Family: Cancellariidae
- Subfamily: Admetinae
- Genus: Admete
- Species: A. microsoma

Binomial name
- Admete microsoma (Dall, 1908)
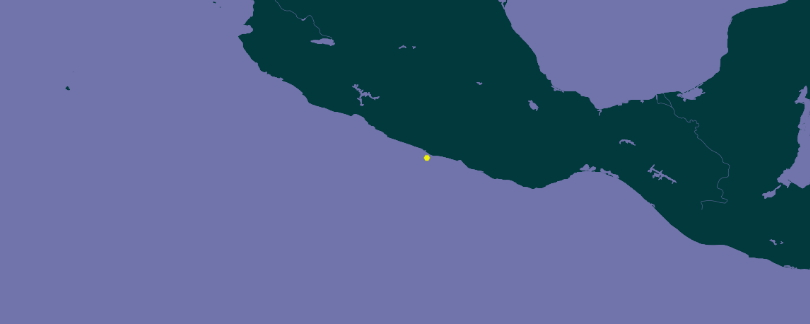

Synonyms
- Cancellaria (Merica) microsoma Dall, 1908; Cancellaria microsoma Dall, 1908

= Admete microsoma =

Species of gastropod

Admete microsoma is a species of sea snail, a marine gastropod mollusk in the family Cancellariidae, the nutmeg snails.

== Description ==
The shell grows to a length of 3.5 mm, the maximum diameter 1.8 mm.

(Original description) The small, thin shell is covered with a pale brownish periostracum. It contains about five tabulate whorls beside the (lost) protoconch. The suture is distinct and not channelled. The whorl in front of it is flattened and beyond the keel at the shoulder moderately rounded.

The axial sculpture consists of lines of growth which are at intervals so prominent as to suggest faint ribs. The spiral sculpture comprises a marked keel at the shoulder, minutely undulate by the axial riblets, and followed by a wide interval. There are about eight less prominent spiral threads, separated by successively narrower intervals with microscopic intercalary threads, covering the whole base.

The aperture is ovate. The outer lip is thin, simple and sharp. The body of the shell is smooth. The columella is straight, short, thin and contains two plaits, the anterior of which forms the edge of the columella. The anterior part of the aperture shows a distinct, but not deep, rounded notch.

== Distribution ==
This marine species occurs off Pacific Mexico.
