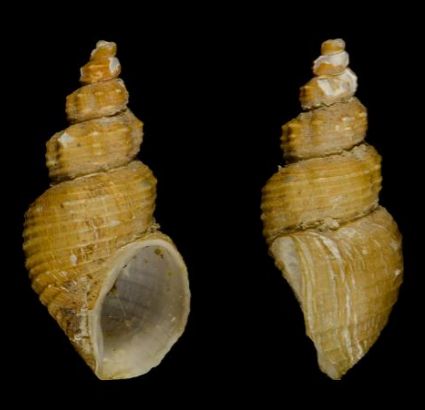
- Shell of Admete gracilior (specimen at the Smithsonian Institution)

Scientific classification
- Kingdom: Animalia
- Phylum: Mollusca
- Class: Gastropoda
- Subclass: Caenogastropoda
- Order: Neogastropoda
- Family: Cancellariidae
- Subfamily: Admetinae
- Genus: Admete
- Species: A. gracilior

Binomial name
- Admete gracilior (Carpenter in Gabb, 1869)
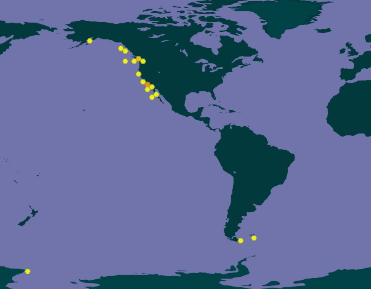

Synonyms
- Admete rhyssa Dall, 1919; Admete seftoni Berry, 1956; Admete woodworthi Dall, 1905; Cancellaria gracilior Carpenter in Gabb, 1869 (original combination)

= Admete gracilior =

Species of gastropod

Admete gracilior, common name the slender admete, is a species of sea snail, a marine gastropod mollusk in the family Cancellariidae, the nutmeg snails.

== Description ==
The length of the shell varies between 7 mm and 12 mm.

(Described as Admete rhyssa) The small, white shell features an olive-colored outer layer called the periostracum, a loosely coiled (decorticated) protoconch, followed by approximately four distinct whorls separated by a distinct suture.

The axial sculpture consists of (on the body whorl a dozen) rather narrow, nearly vertical ribs, which extend from suture to suture along the spire and from the suture to the margin of the base in the body whorl, with wider spaces between. The incremental lines are rather marked. The spiral sculpture consists of (on the spire four, on the body whorl eight) prominent threads with wider interspaces, overriding the ribs and forming nodes where they intersect them. The base of the shell is nearly smooth except for one or two minor threads near the siphonal canal.

The aperture has a semilunate shape. The outer lip is thin. The body of the shell is covered with a thin layer of enamel. The columella shows three oblique plaits. The siphonal canal is shallow, short and contains a faint fasciole.

== Distribution ==
This species occurs in the Pacific Ocean from the Aleutians to California, USA; also off Tierra del Fuego, Argentina and in the Ross Sea, Antarctica.
