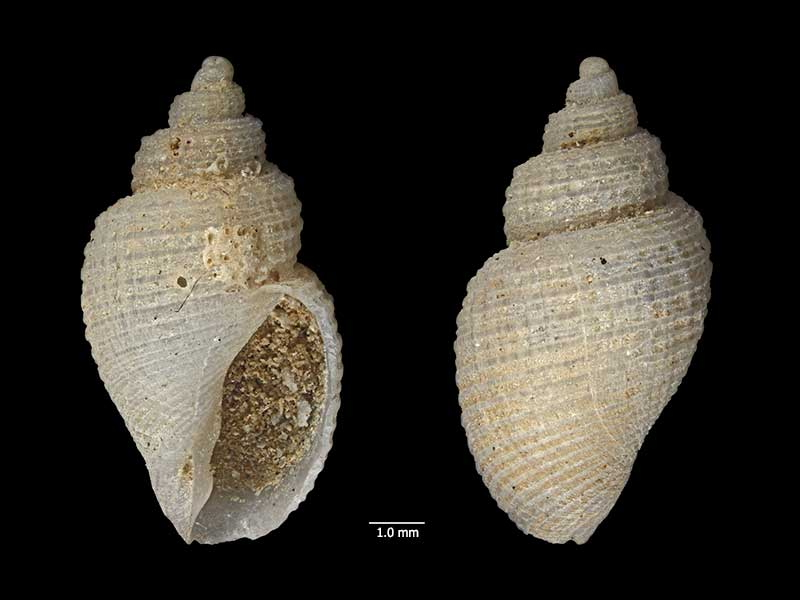
- Shell of Zeadmete barkeri (holotype at the Auckland Museum)

Scientific classification
- Kingdom: Animalia
- Phylum: Mollusca
- Class: Gastropoda
- Subclass: Caenogastropoda
- Order: Neogastropoda
- Family: Cancellariidae
- Genus: Zeadmete
- Species: Z. barkeri

Binomial name
- Zeadmete barkeri Powell, 1952

= Zeadmete barkeri =

Species of gastropod

Zeadmete barkeri is a species of sea snail, a marine gastropod mollusk in the family Cancellariidae, the nutmeg snails.

== Description ==
The length of the shell attains 8.8 mm, its diameter 4.75 mm. The shell is very light coloured cream-white and coils 4 times to a point at the opposite end of the opening of the shell. Each coil is smaller than the previous.

The shell is not smooth, with consistent bumps around the outside.

The shell has one imperfect Stadium (geometry) shaped opening.

== Distribution ==
This marine species is endemic to New Zealand. It can be found off Mayor Island, the Bay of Plenty, and the North Island.
