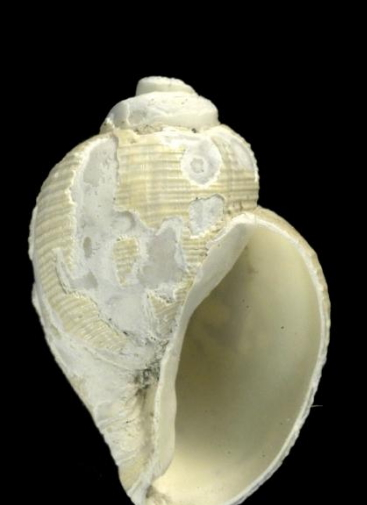
- Shell of Admete schythei (specimen at the Smithsonian Institution)

Scientific classification
- Kingdom: Animalia
- Phylum: Mollusca
- Class: Gastropoda
- Subclass: Caenogastropoda
- Order: Neogastropoda
- Family: Cancellariidae
- Genus: Admete
- Species: A. schythei

Binomial name
- Admete schythei (Philippi, 1855)
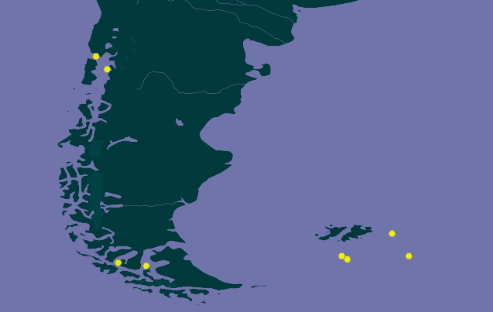

Synonyms
- Cancellaria schythei Philippi, 1855

= Admete schythei =

Species of gastropod

Admete schythei is a species of sea snail, a marine gastropod mollusk in the family Cancellariidae, the nutmeg snails.

== Description ==
The shell grows to a length of 16 mm in a spiral shape a trait shared by others of its genus.

== Distribution ==
This marine species occurs off the Magellanic Straits and the Falkland Islands.
