= Admete watanabei =

Scientific classification
- Kingdom: Animalia
- Phylum: Mollusca
- Class: Gastropoda
- Subclass: Caenogastropoda
- Order: Neogastropoda
- Family: Cancellariidae
- Genus: Admete
- Species: A. watanabei

Binomial name
- Admete watanabei Shikama, 1962

Species of gastropod

Admete watanabei is a species of sea snail, a marine gastropod mollusk in the family Cancellariidae, the nutmeg snails.

== Description ==
The shell grows to a length of 18 mm.

== Distribution ==
This marine species occurs off Japan.
