= Admete clivicola =

Scientific classification
- Kingdom: Animalia
- Phylum: Mollusca
- Class: Gastropoda
- Subclass: Caenogastropoda
- Order: Neogastropoda
- Family: Cancellariidae
- Genus: Admete
- Species: A. clivicola

Binomial name
- Admete clivicola Høisæter, 2011

Species of gastropod

Admete clivicola is a species of marine gastropod mollusk in the family Cancellariidae, the nutmeg snails.

== Distribution ==
This species occurs in the Norwegian Sea off the west coast of Norway. Specimens tentatively assigned to this species are also known from south of Spitsbergen and from the Iceland–Faroe Ridge. It occurs in deep waters (267–2000 m) where the temperature is around 0°C. It is also reported from the Russian Arctic coast.

== Description ==
The shell is oblong and semi-transparent. Most individuals measure no more than 6.25 mm (0.246 in) in length, but they can potentially reach about 10 mm (0.39 in) in length.
