= Admete bruuni =

Scientific classification
- Kingdom: Animalia
- Phylum: Mollusca
- Class: Gastropoda
- Subclass: Caenogastropoda
- Order: Neogastropoda
- Family: Cancellariidae
- Genus: Admete
- Species: A. bruuni

Binomial name
- Admete bruuni Knudsen, 1964

Species of gastropod

Admete bruuni is a species of sea snail, a marine gastropod mollusk in the subfamily Admetinae of the family Cancellariidae, the nutmeg snails.

== Description ==
The shell grows to a length of 22 mm.

== Distribution ==
This marine species occurs in the South Pacific in the Kermadec Trench off the Kermadec Islands.
