= Admete verenae =

Scientific classification
- Kingdom: Animalia
- Phylum: Mollusca
- Class: Gastropoda
- Subclass: Caenogastropoda
- Order: Neogastropoda
- Family: Cancellariidae
- Genus: Admete
- Species: A. verenae

Binomial name
- Admete verenae Harasewych & Petit, 2011

Species of gastropod

Admete verenae is a species of sea snail, a marine gastropod mollusc in the family Cancellariidae, the nutmeg snails.

== Distribution ==
This marine species occurs in the northeast Pacific Ocean.
