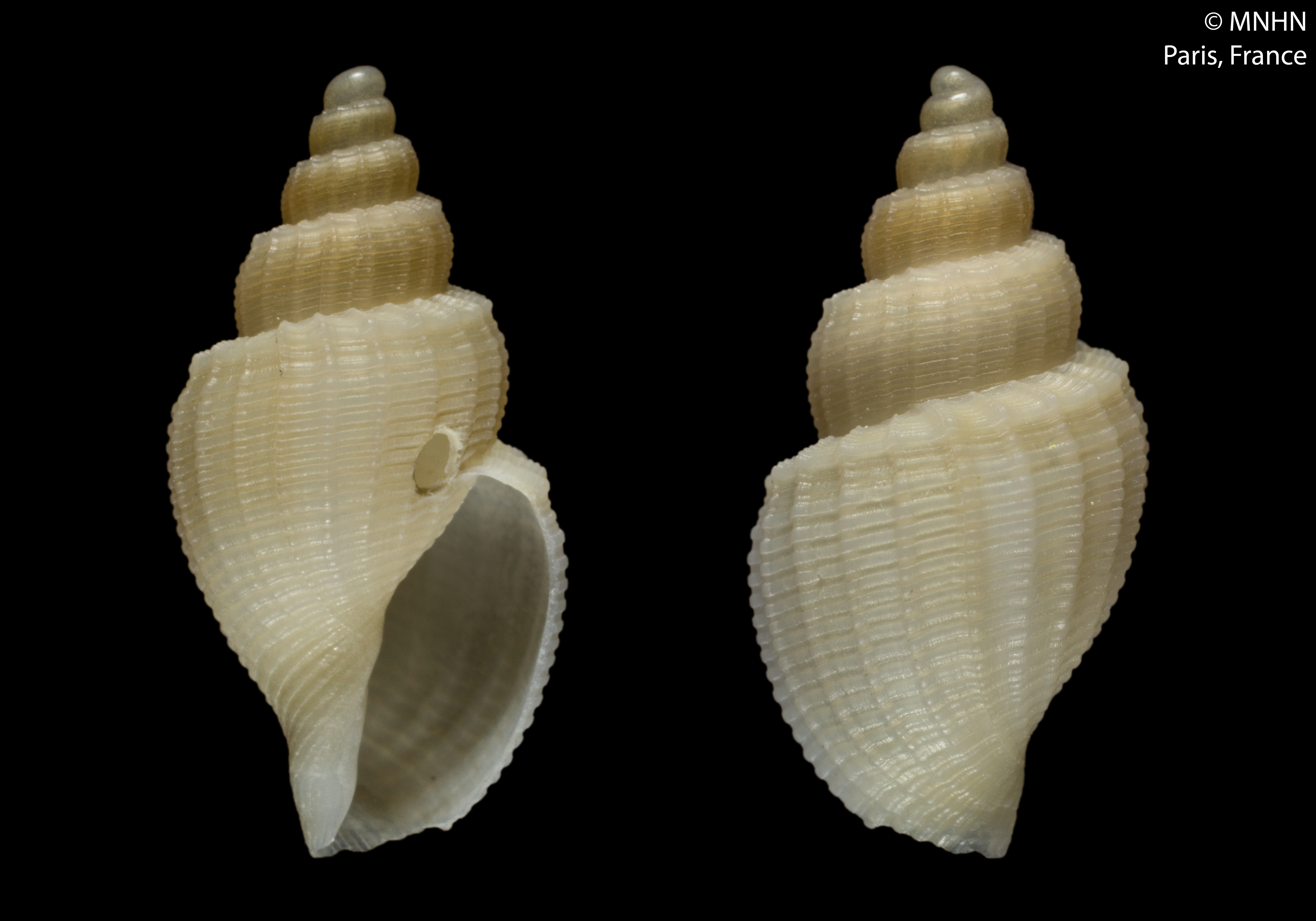
- Shell of Zeadmete physomon (holotype at MNHN, Paris)

Scientific classification
- Kingdom: Animalia
- Phylum: Mollusca
- Class: Gastropoda
- Subclass: Caenogastropoda
- Order: Neogastropoda
- Family: Cancellariidae
- Genus: Zeadmete
- Species: Z. physomon

Binomial name
- Zeadmete physomon Bouchet & Petit, 2008

= Zeadmete physomon =

Species of gastropod

Zeadmete physomon is a species of sea snail, a marine gastropod mollusk in the family Cancellariidae, the nutmeg snails.

== Description ==
The length of the shell attains 13.1 mm.

== Distribution ==
This marine species occurs off Fiji.
