= Zeadmete otagoensis =

Scientific classification
- Kingdom: Animalia
- Phylum: Mollusca
- Class: Gastropoda
- Subclass: Caenogastropoda
- Order: Neogastropoda
- Family: Cancellariidae
- Genus: Zeadmete
- Species: Z. otagoensis

Binomial name
- Zeadmete otagoensis Dell, 1956

Species of gastropod

Zeadmete otagoensis is a species of sea snail, a marine gastropod mollusk in the family Cancellariidae, the nutmeg snails.

== Description ==
The length of the shell attains 6 mm, its diameter 3.5 mm.

== Distribution ==
This marine species is endemic to New Zealand and occurs off South Island.
