= Iphinopsis inflata =

Scientific classification
- Kingdom: Animalia
- Phylum: Mollusca
- Class: Gastropoda
- Subclass: Caenogastropoda
- Order: Neogastropoda
- Family: Cancellariidae
- Genus: Iphinopsis
- Species: I. inflata

Binomial name
- Iphinopsis inflata (Friele, 1879)

Synonyms
- Trichotropis inflata Friele, 1879

Species of gastropod

Iphinopsis inflata is a species of sea snail, a marine gastropod mollusk in the family Cancellariidae, the nutmeg snails.
