= Pepta simplex =

Scientific classification
- Kingdom: Animalia
- Phylum: Mollusca
- Class: Gastropoda
- Subclass: Caenogastropoda
- Order: Neogastropoda
- Family: Cancellariidae
- Genus: Pepta
- Species: P. simplex

Binomial name
- Pepta simplex (Laseron, 1955)

Synonyms
- Pallidonia simplex Laseron, 1955

Species of gastropod

Pepta simplex is a species of sea snail, a marine gastropod mollusk in the family Cancellariidae, the nutmeg snails.
