= Iphinopsis traverseensis =

Scientific classification
- Kingdom: Animalia
- Phylum: Mollusca
- Class: Gastropoda
- Subclass: Caenogastropoda
- Order: Neogastropoda
- Family: Cancellariidae
- Genus: Iphinopsis
- Species: I. traverseensis

Binomial name
- Iphinopsis traverseensis (A.H. Clarke, 1961)

Synonyms
- Lusitromina traverseensis (A.H. Clarke, 1961); Tromina traverseensis A.H. Clarke, 1961

Species of gastropod

Iphinopsis traverseensis is a species of sea snail, a marine gastropod mollusk in the family Cancellariidae, the nutmeg snails.
