= Admete ovata =

Scientific classification
- Kingdom: Animalia
- Phylum: Mollusca
- Class: Gastropoda
- Subclass: Caenogastropoda
- Order: Neogastropoda
- Family: Cancellariidae
- Genus: Admete
- Species: A. ovata

Binomial name
- Admete ovata E.A. Smith, 1875

Species of gastropod

Admete ovata is a species of sea snail, a marine gastropod mollusk in the family Cancellariidae, the nutmeg snails.

== Description ==
The shell grows to a length of 6 mm, its diameter 3.5 mm.

== Distribution ==
This marine species occurs off Japan.
