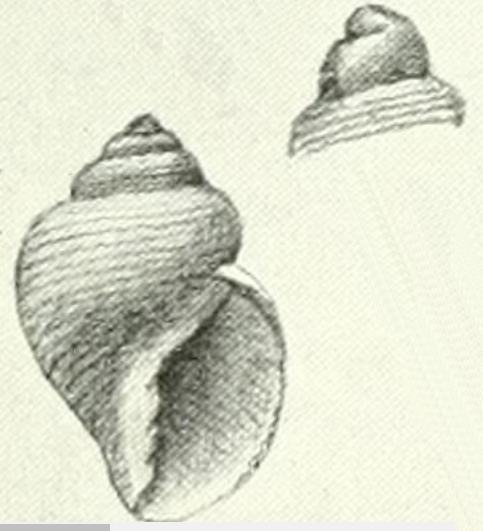
- Shell of Admete magellanica (holotype)

Scientific classification
- Kingdom: Animalia
- Phylum: Mollusca
- Class: Gastropoda
- Subclass: Caenogastropoda
- Order: Neogastropoda
- Family: Cancellariidae
- Genus: Admete
- Species: A. magellanica

Binomial name
- Admete magellanica (Strebel, 1905)
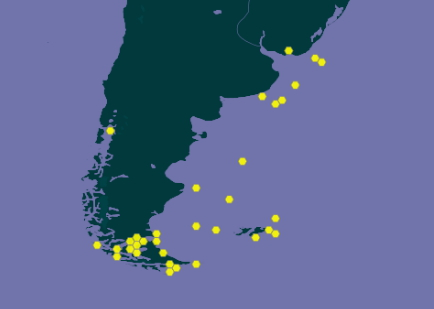

Synonyms
- Cancellaria (Admete) magellanica Strebel, 1905 (basionym); Cancellaria magellanica Strebel, 1905

= Admete magellanica =

Species of gastropod

Admete magellanica is a species of sea snails, a marine gastropod mollusc in the family Cancellariidae, the nutmeg snails.

== Description ==
The length of the shell varies between 8 mm and 25 mm.

(Original description in German) The shell has a conical-ovate shape. It is thin but quite firm. It is white, somewhat translucent, and covered with a yellowish cuticle.

The spire is sometimes more, sometimes less low, as can be seen from the illustrations, but always lower than the body whorl. The protoconch, which is often nibbled or damaged, has a slightly protruding nucleus. The suture of the first whorl is slightly more oblique than in the following whorls, of which there are in total 4½, separated by a slightly deeper lying suture. They depart from the suture somewhat flattened or slightly arched or shallowly inclined in a roof-like manner, then turn steeply and become slightly arched downwards, creating a more or less distinct blunt or sharp edge, which is sometimes emphasized by a stronger spiral thread running there.

The body whorl is weakly constricted on the spindle side, its aperture edge, slightly angular at the top, slopes diagonally downwards into the basal rim, so that there is no siphonal canal. The protruding spire end is fairly perpendicular, it is coiled, so that the basal bulge becomes visible next to the spire coating at the bottom. The base of the shell is obliquely truncated, somewhat bulging, and in addition, there are two not very strong plaits above it, slanting inward.

The sculpture consists of very fine growth lines, occasionally interspersed with coarser ones, and flatly arched spiral threads, which may be more or less broad and more or less densely arranged, but usually, the separating furrows are wide enough to still discern the fine growth lines within them under a magnifying glass. Sometimes these threads are broader towards the top, and it also happens that a stronger one coincides with the upper blunt edge of the whorl.

== Distribution ==
This species occurs in the Southern Atlantic Ocean off Argentina, Tierra del Fuego, the Falkland Islands, and the South Georgia and the South Sandwich Islands.
