= Zeadmete subantarctica =

Scientific classification
- Kingdom: Animalia
- Phylum: Mollusca
- Class: Gastropoda
- Subclass: Caenogastropoda
- Order: Neogastropoda
- Family: Cancellariidae
- Genus: Zeadmete
- Species: Z. subantarctica

Binomial name
- Zeadmete subantarctica Powell, 1933

Species of gastropod

Zeadmete subantarctica is a species of sea snail, a marine gastropod mollusk in the family Cancellariidae, the nutmeg snails.

== Description ==
The length of the shell attains 4.5 mm, its diameter 2.5 mm, with an ovate-cylindrical shape, it is thin, cancellated, and the color is dull-white, aside from the protoconch, which is ochreous buff. The whorls are 4.5mm, including the protoconch, with 1.5mm of smooth, globose whorls.

== Distribution ==
This marine species is endemic to New Zealand and occurs off Snares Island.
