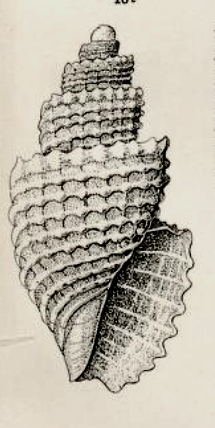
- Shell of Zeadmete pergradata (holotype)

Scientific classification
- Kingdom: Animalia
- Phylum: Mollusca
- Class: Gastropoda
- Subclass: Caenogastropoda
- Order: Neogastropoda
- Superfamily: Volutoidea
- Family: Cancellariidae
- Genus: Zeadmete
- Species: Z. pergradata

Binomial name
- Zeadmete pergradata (Verco, 1904)

Synonyms
- Cancellaria pergradata Verco, 1904 (original combination); Oamaruia pergradata (Verco, 1904); Oamaruia pergradata profundior Cotton & Godfrey, 1932; Oamaruia profundior Cotton & Godfrey, 1932; Vercomaris profundior (J.C. Verco, 1904); Vercomaris pergradata (Verco, 1904)

= Zeadmete pergradata =

Species of gastropod

Zeadmete pergradata is a species of sea snail, a marine gastropod mollusk in the family Cancellariidae, the nutmeg snails.

== Description ==
The length of the shell attains 10 mm, its diameter 5 mm.

(Original description) The small, solid, brown shell is fusiform. The 1½ protoconch is prominent with the apex imbedded. It is smooth and has a light horn colour. The spire contains 3½ whorls, sharply angled. Behind the angle tabulate there is one tuberculate spiral lira. At the angle there is a stout spiral cord, coronate with about 25 sharp tubercles. The penultimate whorl contains four very valid spiral ribs, not quite equal in width to the interspaces (which are as deep as wide), validly tuberculate, by narrow axial striae, running from suture to suture, very obliquely from posterior suture to angle.

The body whorl is obliquely roundly pyramidal, with ten spiral cords rounded, about half as wide as the interspaces, crossed by 26 axial lamellae, which form rounded tubercles at the junction, and coronate the stouter cord at the angle. Finer microscopic axial striae cross the interspaces between the lamellae.

The aperture is obliquely oblong, narrowed and deviated to the left anteriorly, where it ends in a moderate-sized notch. Posteriorly square, the external lip is simple, thin, corrugated by the spiral ribs and uniformly slightly curved. The columella is nearly straight, with two oblique anterior plates. The inner lip is as a thin glaze, not obliterating the spiral ribs on the base of the whorl.

The colour of the shell is uniform dark chestnut-brown.

== Distribution ==
This marine species is endemic to Australia and occurs off South Australia.
