= Zeadmete verheckeni =

Scientific classification
- Kingdom: Animalia
- Phylum: Mollusca
- Class: Gastropoda
- Subclass: Caenogastropoda
- Order: Neogastropoda
- Family: Cancellariidae
- Genus: Zeadmete
- Species: Z. verheckeni

Binomial name
- Zeadmete verheckeni Petit & Harasewych, 2000

Species of gastropod

Zeadmete verheckeni is a species of sea snail, a marine gastropod mollusk in the family Cancellariidae, the nutmeg snails.

The specific name verheckeni is in honor of Belgian malacologist André Verhecken.

== Description ==
Z. Verheckeni is described as a small (6-8mm long), thin-shelled cancellarid snail with an ovate outline and stepped spire, which gives it a turreted appearance. Shells have a rounded anterior end. The shoulder of each whorl is sharply tabulate (flattened).

The protoconch is erect, smooth, and consists of about one and a half whorls; it passes directly into the teleconch, where fine, closely spaced axial ribs appear first and then strengthen as low spiral cords develop within a quarter of a whorl.

The soft body of specimens is white. The animal has a short, narrow foot rounded posteriorly, tubular symmetrical tentacles with large black eyes at their bases, and a long, dorsoventrally flattened penis ending in a small papilla.

== Distribution ==
Natal, South Africa
