= Neadmete =

Scientific classification
- Kingdom: Animalia
- Phylum: Mollusca
- Class: Gastropoda
- Subclass: Caenogastropoda
- Order: Neogastropoda
- Family: Cancellariidae
- Genus: Neadmete; Habe, 1961

Type species
- Neadmete okutanii Petit, 1974

Genus of gastropods

Neadmete is a genus of sea snails, marine gastropod mollusks in the family Cancellariidae, the nutmeg snails.

== Species ==
Species within the genus Neadmete include:

- Neadmete ahoi Harasewych & Petit, 2011
- Neadmete cancellata (Kobelt, 1887a)
- Neadmete circumcincta (Dall, 1873)
- Neadmete japonica (E.A. Smith, 1879b)
- Neadmete modesta (Carpenter, 1864)
- Neadmete nakayamai Habe, 1961
- Neadmete okutanii Petit, 1974
- Neadmete profundicola Okutani, 1964
- Neadmete unalashkensis (Dall, 1873)

Species brought into synonymy

- Neadmete sagamiensis Kuroda & Habe, 1971: synonym of Microsveltia sagamiensis (Kuroda & Habe, 1971)
