= Iphinopsis nuda =

Scientific classification
- Kingdom: Animalia
- Phylum: Mollusca
- Class: Gastropoda
- Subclass: Caenogastropoda
- Order: Neogastropoda
- Family: Cancellariidae
- Genus: Iphinopsis
- Species: I. nuda

Binomial name
- Iphinopsis nuda Dall, 1927

Synonyms
- Trichotropis nuda Dall, 1927

Species of gastropod

Iphinopsis nuda is a species of sea snail, a marine gastropod mollusk in the family Cancellariidae, the nutmeg snails.
