= Neadmete okutanii =

Scientific classification
- Kingdom: Animalia
- Phylum: Mollusca
- Class: Gastropoda
- Subclass: Caenogastropoda
- Order: Neogastropoda
- Family: Cancellariidae
- Genus: Neadmete
- Species: N. okutanii

Binomial name
- Neadmete okutanii Petit, 1974

Species of gastropod

Neadmete okutanii is a species of sea snail, a marine gastropod mollusk in the family Cancellariidae, the nutmeg snails.

== Distribution ==
Specimens of Neadmete okutanii have been recorded in Indonesia and Japan.
