= Zeadmete trailli =

Scientific classification
- Kingdom: Animalia
- Phylum: Mollusca
- Class: Gastropoda
- Subclass: Caenogastropoda
- Order: Neogastropoda
- Family: Cancellariidae
- Genus: Zeadmete
- Species: Z. trailli

Binomial name
- Zeadmete trailli (Hutton, 1873)

Synonyms
- Cancellaria trailli Hutton, 1873

Species of gastropod

Zeadmete trailli is a species of sea snail, a marine gastropod mollusk in the family Cancellariidae, the nutmeg snails.

== Description ==
The length of the shell attains 8.5 mm, its diameter 5 mm.

(Original description) The small, thin, oval shell is white. The spire is short. The whorls are angled. The entire shell is very finely cancellated. The columella contains three oblique folds. The outer lip is slightly crenate.

== Distribution ==
This marine species is endemic to New Zealand and occurs off South Island to Stewart Island.
