= Admete tenuissima =

Scientific classification
- Kingdom: Animalia
- Phylum: Mollusca
- Class: Gastropoda
- Subclass: Caenogastropoda
- Order: Neogastropoda
- Family: Cancellariidae
- Genus: Admete
- Species: A. tenuissima

Binomial name
- Admete tenuissima Okutani & Fujikura, 2002

Species of gastropod

Admete tenuissima is a species of sea snail, a marine gastropod mollusc in the family Cancellariidae, the nutmeg snails.

== Description ==
The length of the shell varies between 16 mm and 20 mm.

== Distribution ==
This marine species occurs off Japan.
