= Admete choshiensis =

Scientific classification
- Kingdom: Animalia
- Phylum: Mollusca
- Class: Gastropoda
- Subclass: Caenogastropoda
- Order: Neogastropoda
- Family: Cancellariidae
- Subfamily: Admetinae
- Genus: Admete
- Species: A. choshiensis

Binomial name
- Admete choshiensis Shikama, 1962
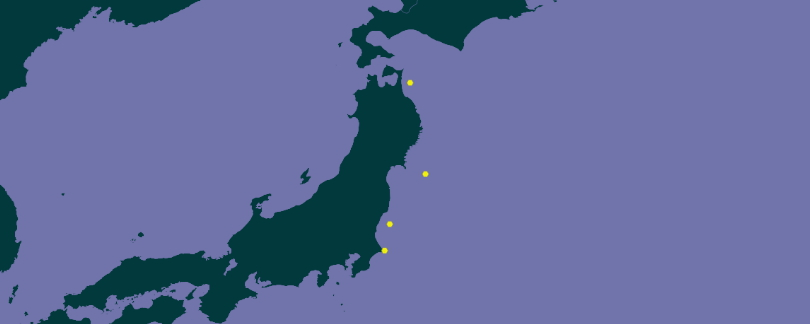

Species of gastropod

Admete choshiensis is a species of sea snail, a marine gastropod mollusk in the family Cancellariidae, the nutmeg snails.

== Description ==
The shell grows to a length of 25 mm.

== Distribution ==
This species occurs in the Pacific Ocean off Japan.
