= Nothoadmete tumida =

Scientific classification
- Kingdom: Animalia
- Phylum: Mollusca
- Class: Gastropoda
- Subclass: Caenogastropoda
- Order: Neogastropoda
- Family: Cancellariidae
- Genus: Nothoadmete
- Species: N. tumida

Binomial name
- Nothoadmete tumida Oliver, 1982

Species of gastropod

Nothoadmete tumida is a species of sea snail, a marine gastropod mollusk in the family Cancellariidae, the nutmeg snails.
