= Zeadmete ovalis =

Scientific classification
- Kingdom: Animalia
- Phylum: Mollusca
- Class: Gastropoda
- Subclass: Caenogastropoda
- Order: Neogastropoda
- Family: Cancellariidae
- Genus: Zeadmete
- Species: Z. ovalis

Binomial name
- Zeadmete ovalis Dell, 1956

Species of gastropod

Zeadmete ovalis is a species of sea snail, a marine gastropod mollusk in the family Cancellariidae, the nutmeg snails.

== Description ==
The length of the shell attains 4.8 mm, its diameter 2.02 mm.

== Distribution ==
This marine species is endemic to New Zealand and occurs off South Island and the Chatham Islands.
