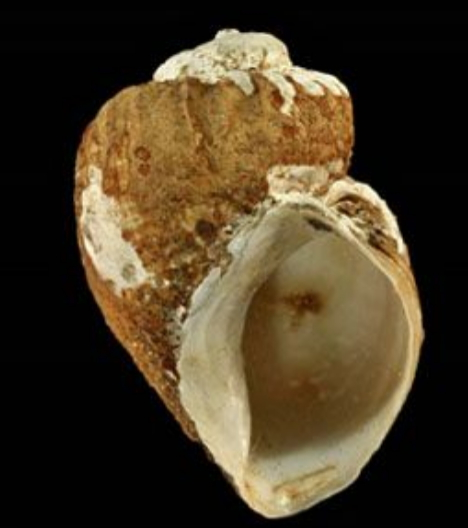
- Shell of Admete contabulata (specimen at the Natural History Museum, Rotterdam)

Scientific classification
- Kingdom: Animalia
- Phylum: Mollusca
- Class: Gastropoda
- Subclass: Caenogastropoda
- Order: Neogastropoda
- Family: Cancellariidae
- Genus: Admete
- Species: A. contabulata

Binomial name
- Admete contabulata Friele, 1879
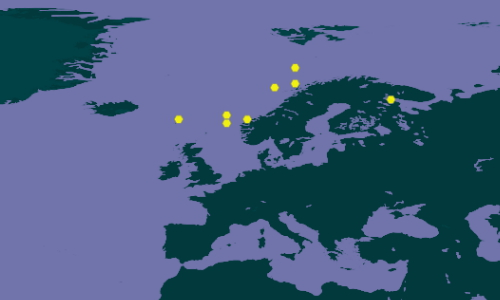

= Admete contabulata =

Species of gastropod

Admete contabulata is a species of sea snail, a marine gastropod mollusk in the family Cancellariidae, the nutmeg snails.

== Description ==
The length of the shell attains 12 mm, its diameter 4.5 mm.

(Original description in Latin) The shell is whitish, turrito-fusiform (tower-shaped and spindle-shaped). It has five whorls, which are angulated above, slightly swollen, and tabulated. The suture is slightly impressed. The spire is elongated, with an apex that is obtuse (blunt) and almost mammillary (nipple-shaped).

The aperture is oval, expanded, sharply rounded below, and it is equal to half the length of the shell. The columella is straight, with two slightly conspicuous folds (plicae). The siphonal canal is very short.

The sculpture is spirally costulate (having small spiral ribs). These ribs, which number 16 on the body whorl, extend to the keel that encircles the uppermost part of the whorls. Above, the surface is now smooth, now furnished with one or two inconspicuous ribs.

On the two middle whorls, there are oblique longitudinal folds, which are nodose (knobbed) around the keel, but these vanish on the body whorl. The primary whorls are convex, smooth, and shining.

(A later description)The shell is conical with 4-5 whorls on the shoulder with a deep suture. Spiral sculpture has frequent cords which are narrow. There can be 20 cords beneath the shoulder.

== Distribution ==
This marine species occurs off Svalbard, Norway and off Murmansk, Russian Federation.
