= Cancellicula =

Scientific classification
- Domain: Eukaryota
- Kingdom: Animalia
- Phylum: Mollusca
- Class: Gastropoda
- Subclass: Caenogastropoda
- Order: Neogastropoda
- Family: Cancellariidae
- Genus: Cancellicula; Tabanelli, 2008

Type species
- † Cancellaria (Narona) dregeri R. Hoernes & Auinger, 1890

Species
- See text

Genus of gastropods

Cancellicula is a genus of medium-sized sea snails, marine gastropod molluscs in the family Cancellariidae, the nutmeg snails.

== Species ==
According to the World Register of Marine Species (WoRMS), the following species with valid names are within the genus Cancellicula :

- Cancellicula aethiopica (Thiele, 1925)
- Cancellicula jonasi (de Barros & Petit, 2007)
- Cancellicula microscopica (Dall, 1889)
