= Zeadmete atlantica =

Scientific classification
- Kingdom: Animalia
- Phylum: Mollusca
- Class: Gastropoda
- Subclass: Caenogastropoda
- Order: Neogastropoda
- Superfamily: Volutoidea
- Family: Cancellariidae
- Genus: Zeadmete
- Species: Z. atlantica

Binomial name
- Zeadmete atlantica Petit, L. D. Campbell & S. C. Campbell, 2010

Species of gastropod

Zeadmete atlantica is a species of sea snail, a marine gastropod mollusk in the family Cancellariidae, the nutmeg snails.

== Description ==
The shell of Zeadmete atlantica is small and slender, with a length of up to 3.76 mm and a diameter of up to 1.96 mm. It is white or pale yellow in color, with spiral ribs and axial folds. The aperture is narrow and oval-shaped.

Zeadmete atlantica was first described in 2010 by Petit, Campbell, and Campbell. It is the only known species of Zeadmete in the Atlantic Ocean.

== Distribution ==
This rare deep-sea species occurs in the Atlantic Ocean off South Carolina, USA.
