= Iphinopsis splendens =

Scientific classification
- Kingdom: Animalia
- Phylum: Mollusca
- Class: Gastropoda
- Subclass: Caenogastropoda
- Order: Neogastropoda
- Family: Cancellariidae
- Genus: Iphinopsis
- Species: I. splendens

Binomial name
- Iphinopsis splendens Simone & Birman, 2006

Species of gastropod

Iphinopsis splendens is a species of sea snail, a marine gastropod mollusk in the family Cancellariidae, the nutmeg snails.
