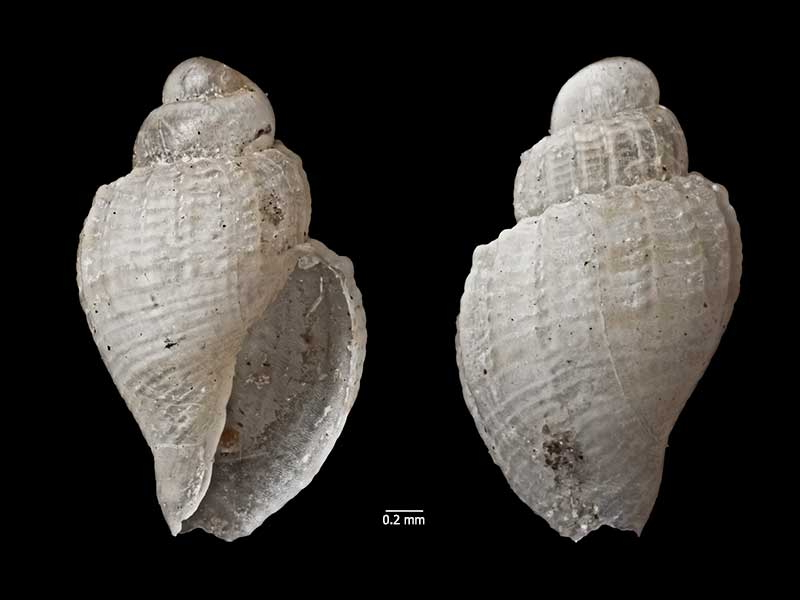
- Shell of Zeadmete aupouria (holotype in the Auckland Museum)

Scientific classification
- Kingdom: Animalia
- Phylum: Mollusca
- Class: Gastropoda
- Subclass: Caenogastropoda
- Order: Neogastropoda
- Superfamily: Volutoidea
- Family: Cancellariidae
- Genus: Zeadmete
- Species: Z. aupouria

Binomial name
- Zeadmete aupouria Powell, 1940

= Zeadmete aupouria =

Species of gastropod

Zeadmete aupouria is a species of sea snail, a marine gastropod mollusk in the family Cancellariidae, the nutmeg snails.

== Description ==
The length of the shell attains 2.6 mm, its diameter 1.6 mm.

== Distribution ==
This marine species occurs off New Zealand.
