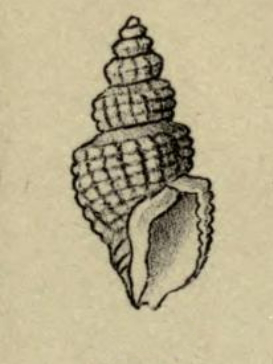
- Drawing of a shell of Admete tabulata

Scientific classification
- Kingdom: Animalia
- Phylum: Mollusca
- Class: Gastropoda
- Subclass: Caenogastropoda
- Order: Neogastropoda
- Family: Cancellariidae
- Genus: Admete
- Species: A. tabulata

Binomial name
- Admete tabulata G.B. Sowerby III, 1875

= Admete tabulata =

Species of gastropod

Admete tabulata is a species of sea snail, a marine gastropod mollusk in the family Cancellariidae, the nutmeg snails.

== Description ==
The shell grows to a length of 22 mm.

The whorls exhibit a narrow tabulate structure, characterized by granular texture resulting from intersecting ribs. The shell, predominantly white, is covered by a brownish epidermis. The columella displays minute plications.

== Distribution ==
This species occurs in Arctic waters.
