= Pepta =

Scientific classification
- Kingdom: Animalia
- Phylum: Mollusca
- Class: Gastropoda
- Subclass: Caenogastropoda
- Order: Neogastropoda
- Family: Cancellariidae
- Genus: Pepta; Iredale, 1925

Genus of gastropods

Pepta is a genus of sea snails, marine gastropod mollusks in the family Cancellariidae, the nutmeg snails.

== Species ==
Species within the genus Pepta include:

- Pepta simplex (Laseron, 1955)
- Pepta stricta (Hedley, 1907)
