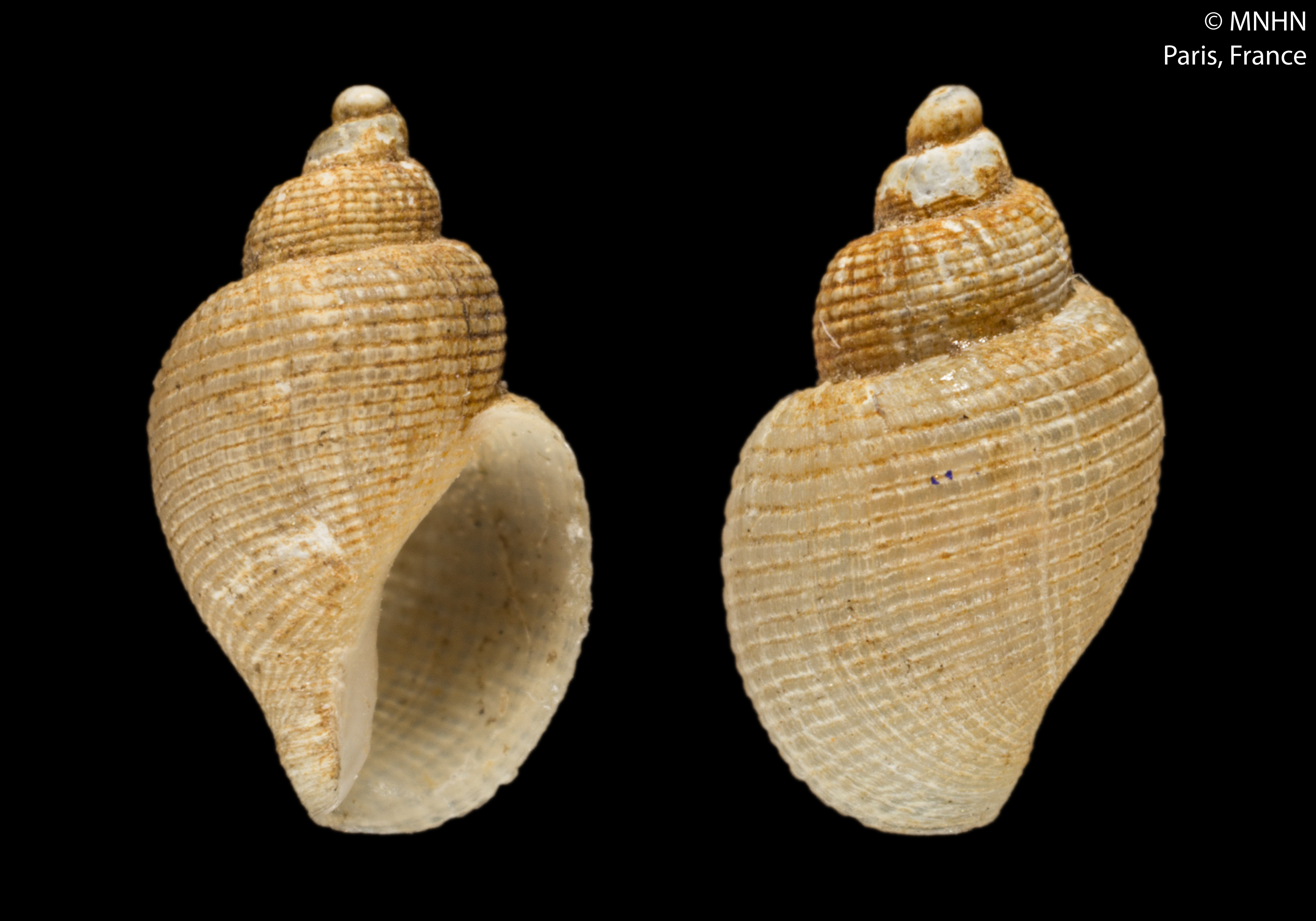
- Shell of Admete frigida (syntype at MNHN, Paris)

Scientific classification
- Kingdom: Animalia
- Phylum: Mollusca
- Class: Gastropoda
- Subclass: Caenogastropoda
- Order: Neogastropoda
- Family: Cancellariidae
- Genus: Admete
- Species: A. frigida

Binomial name
- Admete frigida Rochebrune & Mabille, 1885

= Admete frigida =

Species of gastropod

Admete frigida is a species of sea snail, a marine gastropod mollusk in the family Cancellariidae, the nutmeg snails.

== Description ==
The shell grows to a length of 7 mm; its diameter is 4 mm.

== Distribution ==
This marine species occurs in the Magellanic Straits.
