= Admete specularis =

Scientific classification
- Kingdom: Animalia
- Phylum: Mollusca
- Class: Gastropoda
- Subclass: Caenogastropoda
- Order: Neogastropoda
- Family: Cancellariidae
- Genus: Admete
- Species: A. specularis

Binomial name
- Admete specularis (Watson, 1882)
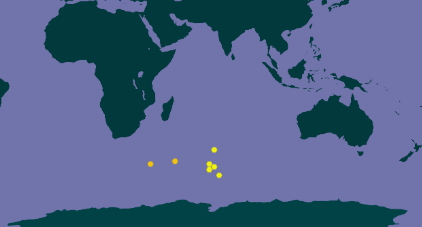

Synonyms
- Cancellaria specularis Watson, 1882a; Cancellaria (Admete) specularis R. B. Watson, 1882 ·

Species of gastropod

Admete specularis is a species of sea snail, a marine gastropod mollusk in the family Cancellariidae, the nutmeg snails.

== Description ==
The shell grows to a length of 10 mm.

(Original description) The small, ovate shell displays distinct striations. It features a short, scalar apex that tapers bluntly. The base of the shell is rounded. It has a very small snout, and a semicircular aperture.

Sculpture. Longitudinals - The numerous hair-like lines of growth are notably strong. Spirals — below the suture a shoulder is marked by an angulation carrying a thread. The shoulder is faintly scored with spiral threads. From the angulation to the snout there are several well-marked threads parted by shallow broader furrows. Toward the tip of the snout is a twisted scar. The whole surface is scored by fine, almost microscopic lines.

Colour: The shell is porcellaneous white beneath the thin dirtyish yellow epidermis.

The scalar spire is rather short and broad and is conical in shape. The apex is blunt, round, a slightly bent inwards at the tip. The shell contains 5½ rounded whorls with a slight angulation near the top and with a slight shoulder above the angle. They exhibit regular increase. T body whorl has a somewhat extended base and a very small snout. The suture is impressively deep. The aperture is rather large and semicircular. The outer lip is regularly rounded and open. It is seamed within by the spirals of the surface. The inner lip is well defined, narrow, displaying a talc-like iridescence, particularly straight on the columella, on the front of which the glaze turns sharply over to the inner side, and leaves there a very slight chink in front. At the point of the columella, the edge is twisted and is bluntly prominent with one or two faint folds above.

== Distribution ==
This species occurs in subantarctic waters off the Crozet Islands and Kerguelen Islands
