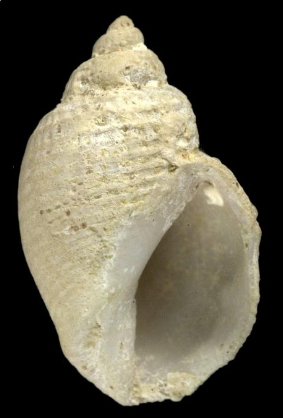
- Shell of Admete philippii (specimen at the Smithsonian Institution)

Scientific classification
- Kingdom: Animalia
- Phylum: Mollusca
- Class: Gastropoda
- Subclass: Caenogastropoda
- Order: Neogastropoda
- Family: Cancellariidae
- Genus: Admete
- Species: A. philippii

Binomial name
- Admete philippii Ihering, 1907
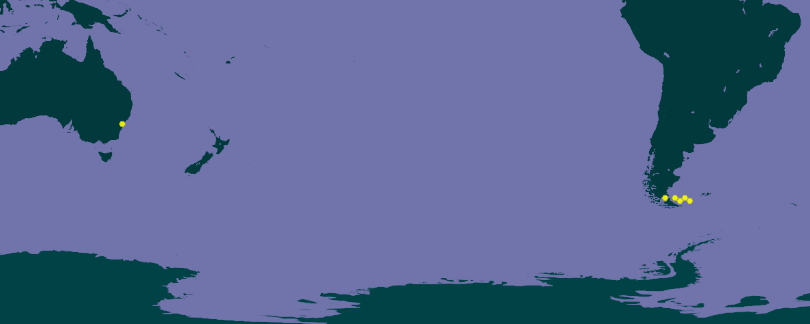

Synonyms
- Admete philippii Carcelles, 1950; Cancellaria australis Philippi, 1855 (non-Sowerby, 1832)

= Admete philippii =

Species of gastropod

Admete philippii is a species of sea snail, a marine gastropod mollusk in the family Cancellariidae, the nutmeg snails.

== Description ==
The shell grows to a length of 13 mm.

== Distribution ==
This marine species occurs in the Magellanic Straits. There is also one mentioning off New South Wales, Australia.
