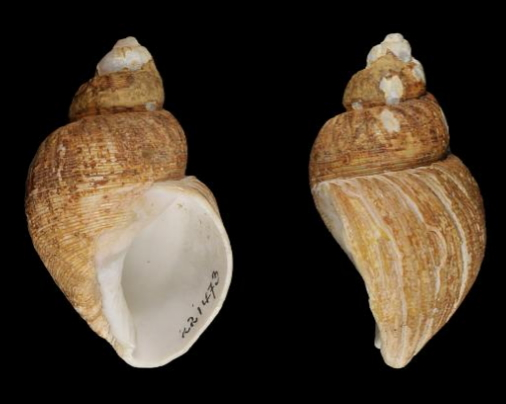
- Shell of Admete solida (specimen at the Smithsonian Institution)

Scientific classification
- Kingdom: Animalia
- Phylum: Mollusca
- Class: Gastropoda
- Subclass: Caenogastropoda
- Order: Neogastropoda
- Family: Cancellariidae
- Genus: Admete
- Species: A. solida

Binomial name
- Admete solida (Aurivillius, 1885)
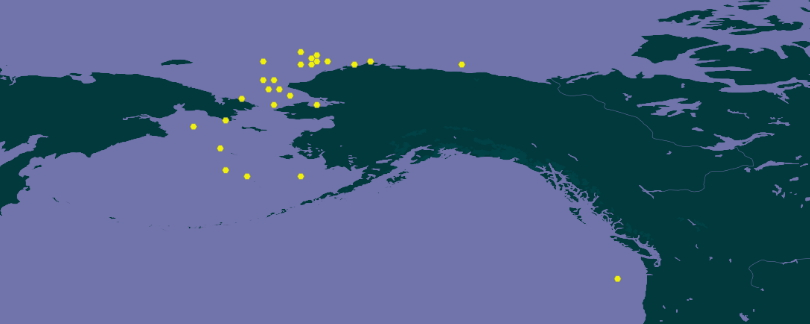

Synonyms
- Admete regina Dall, 1911; Trichotropis solida Aurivillius, 1885 (original combination)

= Admete solida =

Species of gastropod

Admete solida is a species of sea snail, a marine gastropod mollusk in the family Cancellariidae, the nutmeg snails.

== Description ==
The shell grows to a length of 36 mm, its diameter 22 mm.

(Described as Admete regina) The large, solid shell is white, with a coffee-colored periostracum. It typically comprises five or more whorls, the apex in every case being more or less eroded.

The spiral sculpture consists of fine, evenly channeled grooves with flattened or even slightly concave wider interspaces. These grooves cover the whole shell except a narrow gap between the suture and the shoulder of the whorls. Approximately two grooves, along with an interspace, span a single millimeter. The axial sculpture consists of a few faint often more or less obsolete, irregular, low plications, not quite reaching the middle of the whorl.

The suture is very deep but not channeled The whorls themselves possess a moderate curvature. The base of the shell is attenuated, with a narrow, deep umbilical perforation. The outer lip remains simple with minimal thickening. The aperture is white and smooth. The body of the shell is smooth and coated with a smooth layer of white callus. The columella is concavely arcuate and exhibits six or more feeble plaits with the anterior end of the columella projecting over a deep notch.

== Distribution ==
This species occurs in Arctic waters and the Bering Sea.
