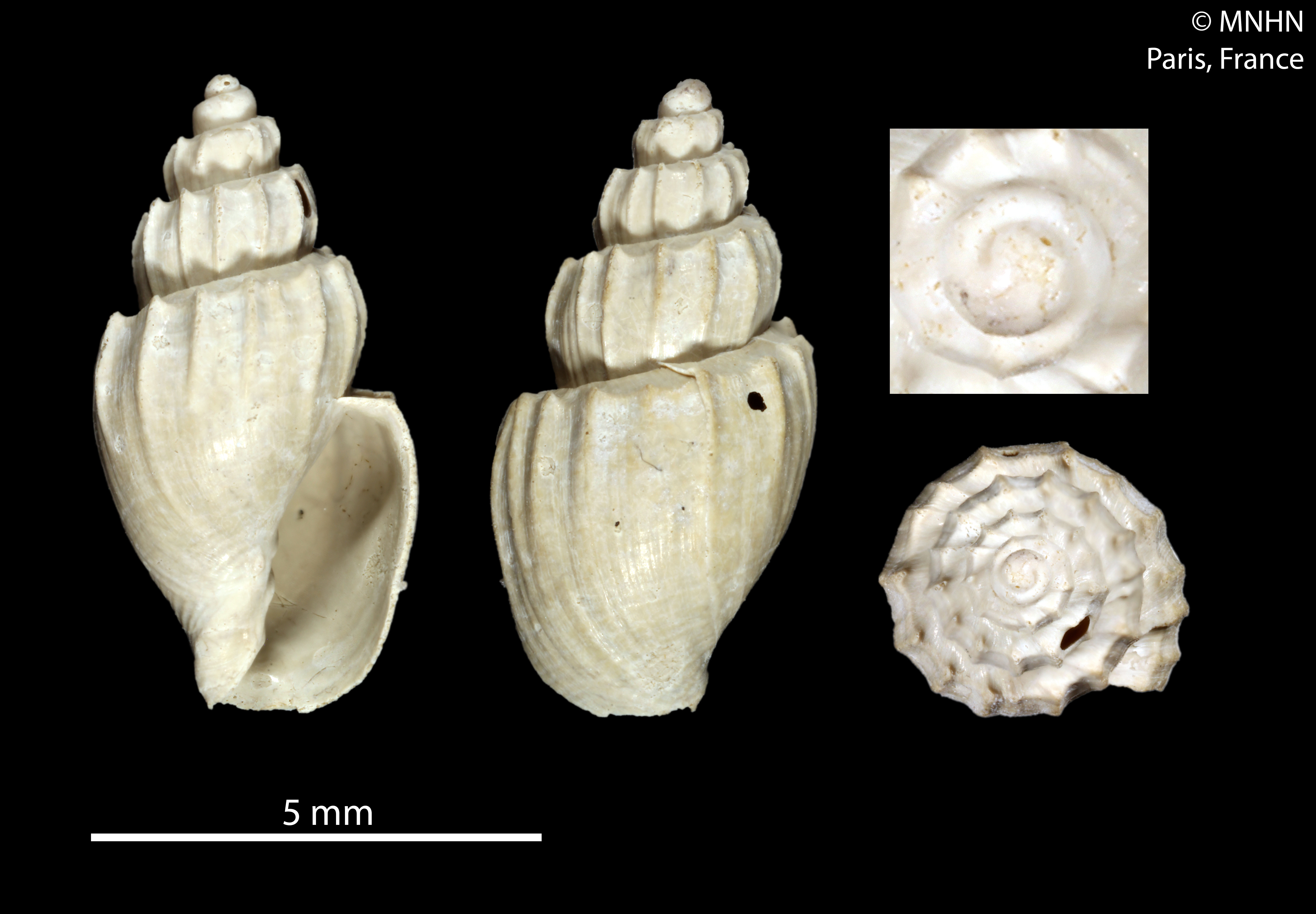
- Shell of Zeadmete apoensis (paratype in the MNHN, Paris))

Scientific classification
- Kingdom: Animalia
- Phylum: Mollusca
- Class: Gastropoda
- Subclass: Caenogastropoda
- Order: Neogastropoda
- Superfamily: Volutoidea
- Family: Cancellariidae
- Genus: Zeadmete
- Species: Z. apoensis

Binomial name
- Zeadmete apoensis Verhecken, 2011

= Zeadmete apoensis =

Species of gastropod

Zeadmete apoensis is a species of sea snail, a marine gastropod mollusk in the family Cancellariidae, the nutmeg snails.

== Description ==
The length of the shell attains 7.5 mm.

== Distribution ==
This marine species occurs off the Philippines
