= Pepta stricta =

Scientific classification
- Kingdom: Animalia
- Phylum: Mollusca
- Class: Gastropoda
- Subclass: Caenogastropoda
- Order: Neogastropoda
- Family: Cancellariidae
- Genus: Pepta
- Species: P. stricta

Binomial name
- Pepta stricta (Hedley, 1907)

Synonyms
- Admete stricta Hedley, 1907

Species of gastropod

Pepta stricta is a species of sea snail, a marine gastropod mollusk in the family Cancellariidae, the nutmeg snails.
