= Neadmete circumcincta =

Scientific classification
- Kingdom: Animalia
- Phylum: Mollusca
- Class: Gastropoda
- Subclass: Caenogastropoda
- Order: Neogastropoda
- Family: Cancellariidae
- Genus: Neadmete
- Species: N. circumcincta

Binomial name
- Neadmete circumcincta (Dall, 1873)

Synonyms
- Admete circumcincta (Dall, 1873); Cancellaria circumcincta Dall, 1873

Species of gastropod

Neadmete circumcincta is a species of sea snail, a marine gastropod mollusk in the family Cancellariidae, the nutmeg snails.

== Description ==
The shell grows to a length of 22 mm.

== Distribution ==
This species occurs in the Pacific Ocean from Alaska to British Columbia, Canada
