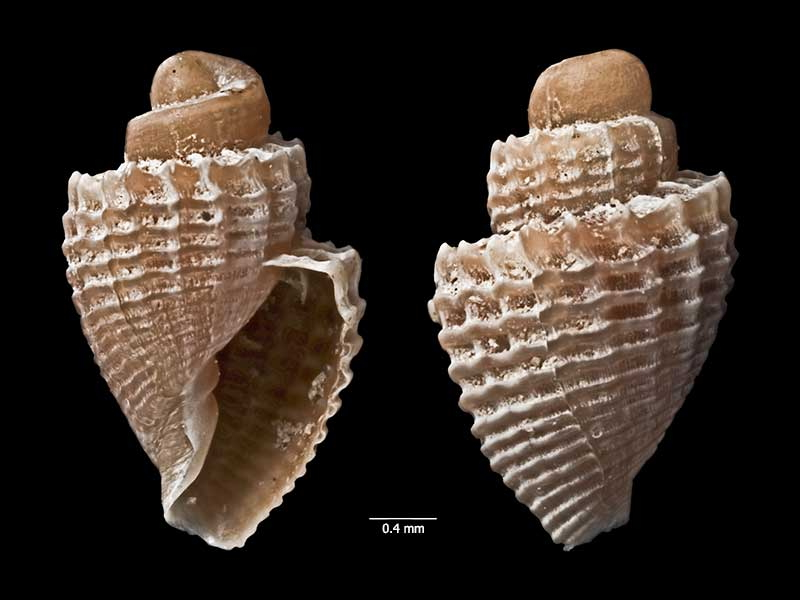
- Shell of Zeadmete finlayi (holotype at Auckland Museum)

Scientific classification
- Kingdom: Animalia
- Phylum: Mollusca
- Class: Gastropoda
- Subclass: Caenogastropoda
- Order: Neogastropoda
- Family: Cancellariidae
- Genus: Zeadmete
- Species: Z. finlayi

Binomial name
- Zeadmete finlayi Powell, 1940

Synonyms
- Admete finlayi (Powell, 1940)

= Zeadmete finlayi =

Species of gastropod

Zeadmete finlayi is a species of sea snail, a marine gastropod mollusk in the family Cancellariidae, the nutmeg snails.

== Description ==
The length of the shell attains 3 mm and a diameter of 1.8 mm.

== Distribution ==
This marine species is endemic to New Zealand and occurs off North Island.
