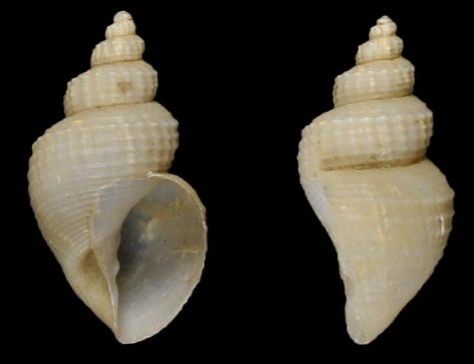
- Shell of Admete californica (holotype at the Smithsonian Institution)

Scientific classification
- Kingdom: Animalia
- Phylum: Mollusca
- Class: Gastropoda
- Subclass: Caenogastropoda
- Order: Neogastropoda
- Family: Cancellariidae
- Subfamily: Admetinae
- Genus: Admete
- Species: A. californica

Binomial name
- Admete californica (Dall, 1908)
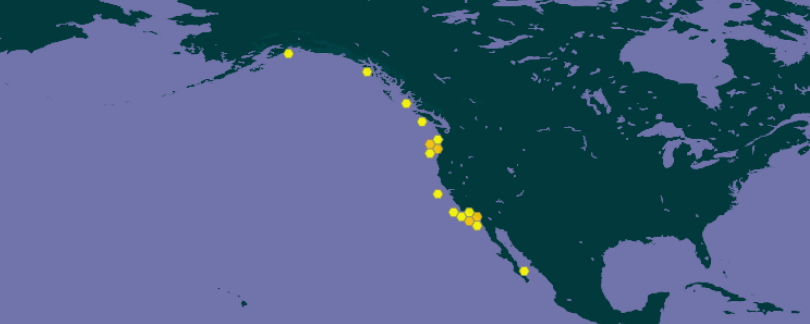

Synonyms
- Cancellaria (Admete) californica Dall, 1908 (superseded combination); Cancellaria californica Dall, 1908

= Admete californica =

Species of mollusc

Admete californica is a species of sea snail, a marine gastropod mollusk in the family Cancellariidae, the nutmeg snails.

== Description ==
The shell grows to a length of 16 mm, the maximum diameter 8.3 mm.

(Original description) The thin shell has a turret shape and contains five whorls beside the protoconch. The shell is white, with a pale, olive-colored outermost layer (periostracum).

The protoconch is blunt, slightly swollen, measures about a whorl and a half, and while smooth, it lacks a polished appearance. The subsequent whorls show a prominent angular shoulder, above which the whorl flattens out, with the angle becoming obsolete in the body whorl of the adult shell. Initially, the space between the angle and the suture behind it is nearly smooth and flat, but later it develops faint spiral threads and becomes more convex.

The axial sculpture consists of numerous (on the penultimate whorl about twenty) low rounded ribs, with shallow, evenly interspaces, most prominent at the angle, but fading on the flattened portion and on the body whorl, extending on the spire to the next suture. The incremental lines are also rather conspicuous. The spiral sculpture in front of the angle of (on the spire about four, on the body whorl about twenty) low rounded subequal spiral threads with wider spaces between them. These threads are slightly swollen where they intersect the ribs, especially on the spire, and are more closely packed on the body whorl, anteriorly, where they extend towards the umbilicus.

The aperture is somewhat triangular. The outer lip is thin and is not reflected. The body is covered with a thin wash of callus. The columella is thin, straight and shows three folds, with the middle one being the most prominent. The siphonal canal is either very small or absent. The umbilicus is relatively large, funnel-shaped with vertically striped walls, the opening partially hidden by the columellar lip. In young shells the umbilicus is relatively much smaller. The operculum is absent.

== Distribution ==
This species occurs in the Pacific Ocean from Alaska to Baja California peninsula, Mexico
