= Neadmete japonica =

Scientific classification
- Kingdom: Animalia
- Phylum: Mollusca
- Class: Gastropoda
- Subclass: Caenogastropoda
- Order: Neogastropoda
- Family: Cancellariidae
- Genus: Neadmete
- Species: N. japonica

Binomial name
- Neadmete japonica (E.A. Smith, 1879b)

Synonyms
- Cancellaria japonica E.A. Smith, 1879b

Species of gastropod

Neadmete japonica is a species of sea snail, a marine gastropod mollusk in the family Cancellariidae, the nutmeg snails.
