= Nothoadmete delicatula =

Scientific classification
- Kingdom: Animalia
- Phylum: Mollusca
- Class: Gastropoda
- Subclass: Caenogastropoda
- Order: Neogastropoda
- Family: Cancellariidae
- Genus: Nothoadmete
- Species: N. delicatula

Binomial name
- Nothoadmete delicatula (E.A. Smith, 1907)

Synonyms
- Admete delicatula E.A. Smith, 1907

Species of gastropod

Nothoadmete delicatula is a species of sea snail, a marine gastropod mollusk in the family Cancellariidae, the nutmeg snails.

Nothaodmete delicatula has a pale, grayish-white spiral shell approximately 5mm in length.

Specimens of this species have been collected in the Ross Sea, off the coast of Antarctica, as well as off of that part of the Antarctic coast that faces Australia.
