= Nothoadmete antarctica =

Scientific classification
- Kingdom: Animalia
- Phylum: Mollusca
- Class: Gastropoda
- Subclass: Caenogastropoda
- Order: Neogastropoda
- Family: Cancellariidae
- Genus: Nothoadmete
- Species: N. antarctica

Binomial name
- Nothoadmete antarctica (Strebel, 1908)

Synonyms
- Admete antarctica (Strebel, 1908); Cancellaria antarctica Strebel, 1908 (basionym)

Species of gastropod

Nothoadmete antarctica is a species of sea snail, a marine gastropod mollusk in the family Cancellariidae, the nutmeg snails.

== Description ==
The shell grows to a length of 12 mm (0.472441 inches). Their habitat is benthic in water seafloors.

== Distribution ==
This species occurs in Antarctic waters off South Georgia Islands, the South Orkneys and the South Shetlands. It is a benthic animal. With a depth range from 73 to 659 meters. It is a subtropical animal, from 54°S - 65°S, 180°E - 36°E.
