= Nothoadmete euthymei =

Scientific classification
- Kingdom: Animalia
- Phylum: Mollusca
- Class: Gastropoda
- Subclass: Caenogastropoda
- Order: Neogastropoda
- Family: Cancellariidae
- Genus: Nothoadmete
- Species: N. euthymei

Binomial name
- Nothoadmete euthymei (Barnard, 1960)

Synonyms
- Cancellaria euthymei Barnard, 1960; Iphinopsis euthymei (Barnard, 1960)

Species of gastropod

Nothoadmete euthymei is a species of sea snail, a marine gastropod mollusk in the family Cancellariidae, the nutmeg snails.

== Description ==
The maximum shell size is 9.5 mm.

== Distribution ==
This marine species is found off South East Africa.
