= Iphinopsis kulanda =

Scientific classification
- Kingdom: Animalia
- Phylum: Mollusca
- Class: Gastropoda
- Subclass: Caenogastropoda
- Order: Neogastropoda
- Family: Cancellariidae
- Genus: Iphinopsis
- Species: I. kulanda

Binomial name
- Iphinopsis kulanda (Garrard, 1975)

Synonyms
- Zeadmete kulanda Garrard, 1975

Species of gastropod

Iphinopsis kulanda is a species of sea snail, a marine gastropod mollusk in the family Cancellariidae, the nutmeg snails.
