= Neadmete unalashkensis =

Scientific classification
- Kingdom: Animalia
- Phylum: Mollusca
- Class: Gastropoda
- Subclass: Caenogastropoda
- Order: Neogastropoda
- Family: Cancellariidae
- Genus: Neadmete
- Species: N. unalashkensis

Binomial name
- Neadmete unalashkensis (Dall, 1873)

Synonyms
- Admete unalashkensis (Dall, 1873); Cancellaria unalashkensis Dall, 1873 (basionym)

Species of gastropod

Neadmete unalashkensis is a species of sea snail, a marine gastropod mollusk in the family Cancellariidae, the nutmeg snails.

== Description ==
The shell grows to a length of 18 mm.

== Distribution ==
This species occurs in the Pacific Ocean from Alaska to Oregon, USA.
