= Iphinopsis alba =

- Iphinopsis alba shell

Scientific classification
- Kingdom: Animalia
- Phylum: Mollusca
- Class: Gastropoda
- Subclass: Caenogastropoda
- Order: Neogastropoda
- Family: Cancellariidae
- Genus: Iphinopsis
- Species: I. alba

Binomial name
- Iphinopsis alba Bouchet & Warén, 1985

Species of gastropod

Iphinopsis alba is a species of sea snail, a marine gastropod mollusk in the family Cancellariidae, the nutmeg snails.
