= Cancellicula aethiopica =

Scientific classification
- Kingdom: Animalia
- Phylum: Mollusca
- Class: Gastropoda
- Subclass: Caenogastropoda
- Order: Neogastropoda
- Family: Cancellariidae
- Genus: Cancellicula
- Species: C. aethiopica

Binomial name
- Cancellicula aethiopica (Thiele, 1925)

Synonyms
- Admete aethiopica Thiele, 1925 (basionym)

Species of gastropod

Cancellicula aethiopica is a species of sea snail, a marine gastropod mollusk in the family Cancellariidae, the nutmeg snails.

== Description ==
The shell grows to a length of 4 mm.

== Distribution ==
This species occurs in the Indian Ocean off Somalia.
