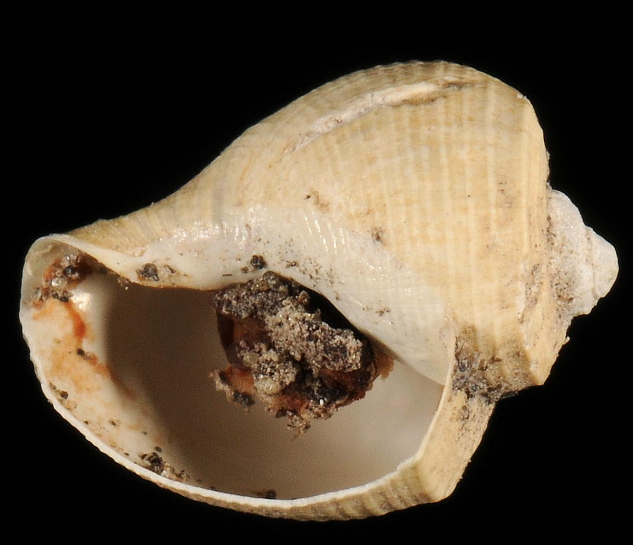
- Shell of Zeadmete watsoni (specimen at the Smithsonian Institution)

Scientific classification
- Kingdom: Animalia
- Phylum: Mollusca
- Class: Gastropoda
- Subclass: Caenogastropoda
- Order: Neogastropoda
- Family: Cancellariidae
- Genus: Zeadmete
- Species: Z. watsoni

Binomial name
- Zeadmete watsoni Petit, 1970

Synonyms
- Admete carinata (R. B. Watson, 1882) ·; Cancellaria (Admete) carinata Watson, 1882 (non Briart & Cornet, 1877); Cancellaria carinata R. B. Watson, 1882 (invalid: junior homonym of Cancellaria carinata Briart & Cornet, 1877; Zeadmete watsoni is a replacement name)

= Zeadmete watsoni =

Species of gastropod

Zeadmete watsoni is a species of sea snail, a marine gastropod mollusk in the family Cancellariidae, the nutmeg snails.

== Description ==
(Original description) The white shell is broadly ovate, carinate, spiralled, with a very short, blunt, scalar spire.

Sculpture. Longitudinals—there are only fine, sharp, unequal puckerings on the lines of growth. Spirals— a sharp flanged keel lies about the middle of the whorls. Above this is the horizontal, slightly concave shoulder, on which are no spirals. Below the keel the whole surface is scored with fine prominent rounded unequal threads, parted by broader intervals. Those on the aperture are feeble.

The spire is very short and depressed, but rising in broad shallow steps. The apex is small and raised. The shell contains five whorls, flattened or even slightly concave above, strongly keeled and angulated in the middle, of regular increase. The body whorl is very large and ventricose, with an elongated but convex base and a very small aperture. The suture is impressed and very horizontal.

The oval aperture is fully half the size of the shell. It is angulated at the keel and at the base of the columella. The outer lip is rounded and open, advancing a little in front of the point of the columella. The inner lip is thinly spread on the body, with a small chink in front behind the columella, the edge of which is narrow and twisted, with two indistinct folds above it.

== Distribution ==
This species occurs in the Scotia Sea and the Kerguelen Islands.
