= Neadmete modesta =

Scientific classification
- Kingdom: Animalia
- Phylum: Mollusca
- Class: Gastropoda
- Subclass: Caenogastropoda
- Order: Neogastropoda
- Family: Cancellariidae
- Genus: Neadmete
- Species: N. modesta

Binomial name
- Neadmete modesta (Carpenter, 1864)

Synonyms
- Admete modesta (Carpenter, 1864); Cancellaria modesta Carpenter, 1864 (basionym)

Species of gastropod

Neadmete modesta, common name the modest admete, is a species of sea snail, a marine gastropod mollusk in the family Cancellariidae, the nutmeg snails.

== Description ==
The snail Neadmete modesta has a strongly tabulated spire profile with a broadly channelled sutural ramp. This means that the spire (the top of the shell) is flat and has a wide channel at the suture (where the whorls of the shell meet). The aperture (the opening of the shell) of Neadmete modesta is narrower than that of other snails in the same genus, and it tapers anteriorly (towards the front of the shell). The shell grows to a length of 16 mm.

== Distribution ==
This species occurs in the demersal zone of the Pacific Ocean from the Aleutians to Baja California, Mexico, at depths between 1 m and 20 m.
