= Nothoadmete harpovoluta =

Scientific classification
- Kingdom: Animalia
- Phylum: Mollusca
- Class: Gastropoda
- Subclass: Caenogastropoda
- Order: Neogastropoda
- Family: Cancellariidae
- Genus: Nothoadmete
- Species: N. harpovoluta

Binomial name
- Nothoadmete harpovoluta (Powell, 1957)

Synonyms
- Admete harpovoluta Powell, 1957 (original combination); Toledonia globosa Tomlin, 1948 (non-Hedley, 1916)

Species of gastropod

Nothoadmete harpovoluta is a species of sea snail, a marine gastropod mollusk in the family Cancellariidae, the nutmeg snails.

== Description ==
The shell grows to a length of 3.8 mm.

== Distribution ==
This marine species occurs off New South Wales -to Victoria, Australia.
