= Inglisella =

Scientific classification
- Kingdom: Animalia
- Phylum: Mollusca
- Class: Gastropoda
- Subclass: Caenogastropoda
- Order: Neogastropoda
- Family: Cancellariidae
- Genus: Inglisella; Finlay, 1924

Type species
- Inglisella pukeuriensis Suter, H.

Genus of gastropods

Inglisella is a genus of sea snails, marine gastropod mollusks in the family Cancellariidae, the nutmeg snails.

== Species ==
Species within the genus Inglisella include:

- Inglisella etheridgei (Johnston, 1880)
- Inglisella marwicki (Dell, 1956)

Species brought into synonymy

- Inglisella nympha Garrard, 1975: synonym of Brocchinia exigua (E.A. Smith, 1891)
- Inglisella septentrionalis Finlay, 1930: synonym of Brocchinia septentrionalis (Finlay, 1930)
