= Waipaoa =

Scientific classification
- Kingdom: Animalia
- Phylum: Mollusca
- Class: Gastropoda
- Subclass: Caenogastropoda
- Order: Neogastropoda
- Family: Cancellariidae
- Genus: Waipaoa; Marwick, 1931

Genus of gastropods

Waipaoa is a genus of sea snails, marine gastropod mollusks in the family Cancellariidae, the nutmeg snails.

== Species ==
Species within the genus Waipaoa include:

- Waipaoa marwicki Dell, 1956
