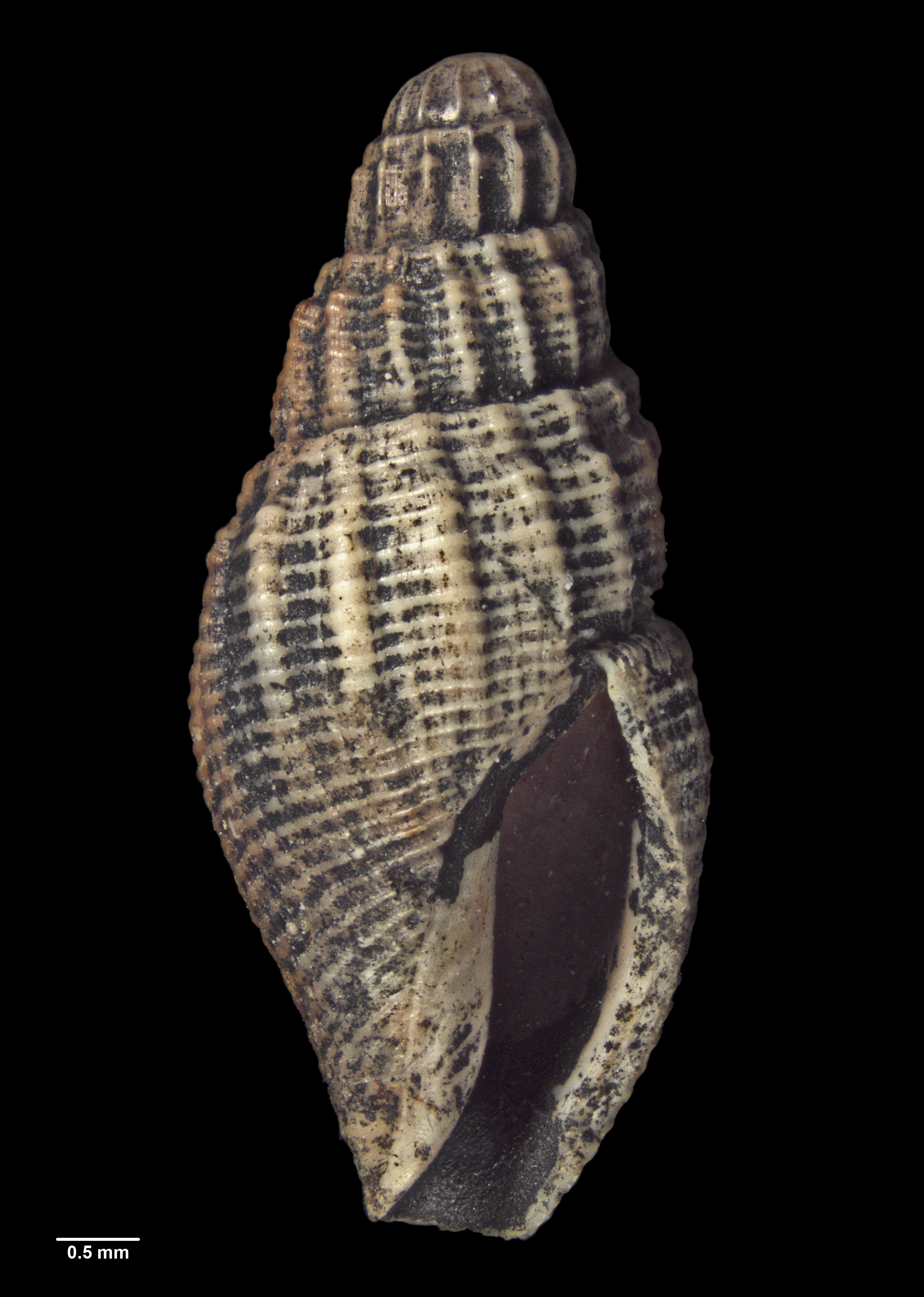
- Holotype of Syngenochilus radiapex

Scientific classification
- Kingdom: Animalia
- Phylum: Mollusca
- Class: Gastropoda
- Subclass: Caenogastropoda
- Order: Neogastropoda
- Superfamily: Conoidea
- Genus: †Syngenochilus; Powell, 1944

Type species
- Syngenochilus radiapex

= Syngenochilus =

Genus of gastropods

Syngenochilus is a genus of minute gastropod molluscs belonging to the superfamily Conoidea, currently unassigned to a family. The genus is a fossil taxon, known to occur between the late Eocene to the early Miocene, and has been found in fossil beds in Victoria, Australia.

== Description ==
In the original description, Powell described the genus as below:

This genus resembles the Cancellarid Inglisella, but is actually a small, heavily sculptured Daphnellid close to Teleochilus, but differing from that genus in having an axially ridged protoconch instead of spiral cords.

Members of the genus have a small ovate or ovate-fusiform shell measuring up to 7.25 mm (0.285 in), with a bluntly rounded apex. Syngenochilus has a small, flattened protoconch, that has a half whorl with a flattened tip. The following whorl has axial ribs that merge into its teleoconch.

The genus is visually similar to Parasyngenochilus, but can be differentiated due to Syngenochilus having a flat smooth portion of the protonch, compared to the dome-shape typical of Parasyngenochilus, and differentiated from Teleochilus due to the shorter and smaller aperture seen in Syngenochilus. S. johannaensis can be differentiated from S. radiapex due to having widely spaced and persistent axial ribbing.

== Taxonomy ==
The genus was first described by A. W. B. Powell in 1944, naming S. radiapex as the type species. The genus was monotypic until 1981, when D. C. Long described S. johannaensis. The holotype of S. radiapex is held by the Auckland War Memorial Museum, and S. johannaensis by the National Museum of Victoria. The genus was placed in the superfamily Conoidea but excluded from the family Turridae by Yu I Kantor et al. in 2024.

== Distribution ==
Syngenochilus fossils have been found in the Jan Juc Formation, Puebla Formation and Glen Aire Clay of the Port Phillip Basin, Torquay, Victoria, Australia, and the Browns Creek Formation of the Otway Basin, Australia. Fossils have been dated to between the late Eocene to the early Miocene.

== Species ==
Species within the genus Syngenochilus include:

- † Syngenochilus johannaensis D. C. Long, 1981
- † Syngenochilus radiapex A. W. B. Powell, 1944

== See also ==
- Conoidea
- Gastropoda
- Inglisella
- Teleochilus
- Paleomalacology
