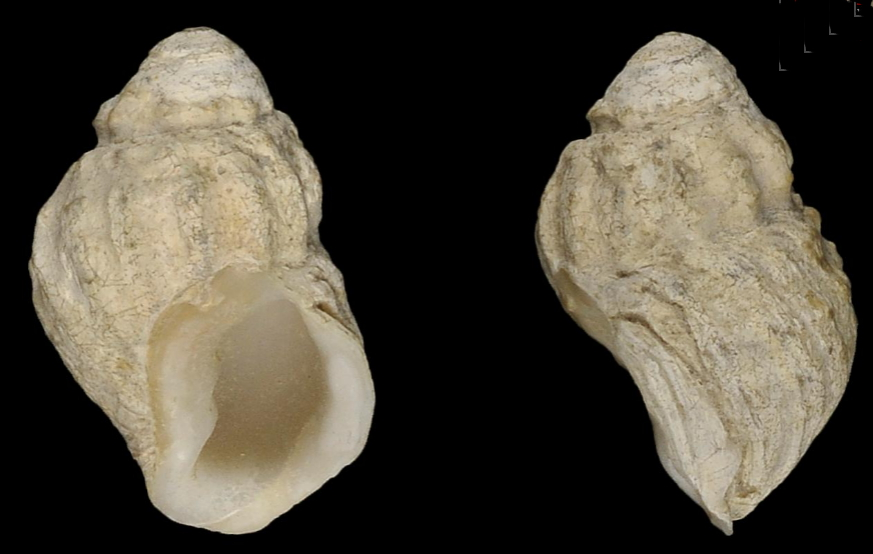
- Shell of Brocchinia nodosa (holotype at the Smithsonian Institution)

Scientific classification
- Kingdom: Animalia
- Phylum: Mollusca
- Class: Gastropoda
- Subclass: Caenogastropoda
- Order: Neogastropoda
- Family: Cancellariidae
- Genus: Brocchinia
- Species: B. nodosa

Binomial name
- Brocchinia nodosa (A. E. Verrill & S. Smith, 1885)

Synonyms
- Admete nodosa Verrill & Smith, 1885

= Brocchinia nodosa =

Species of gastropod

Brocchinia nodosa is a species of sea snail, a marine gastropod mollusk in the family Cancellariidae, the nutmeg snails.
