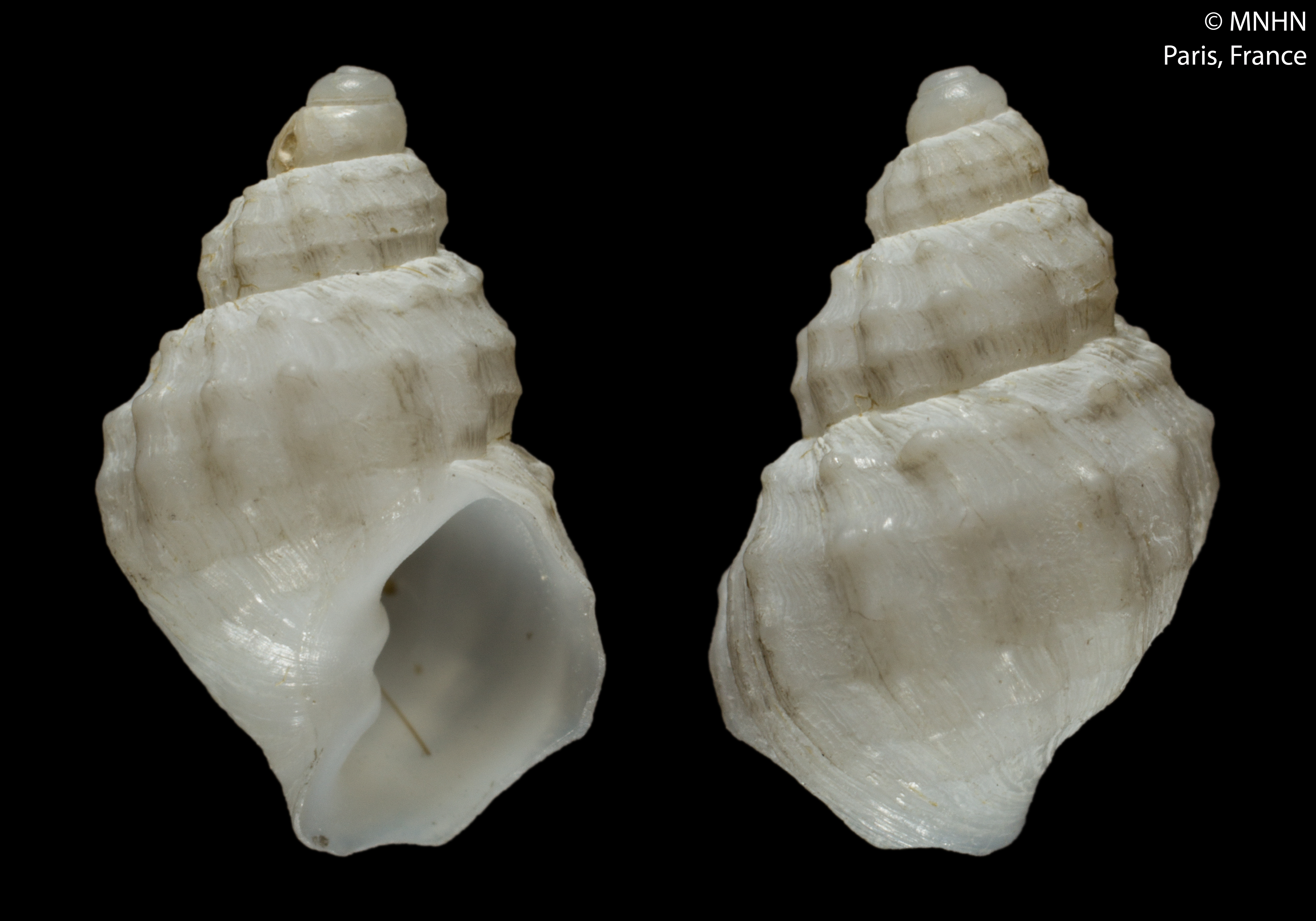

Scientific classification
- Kingdom: Animalia
- Phylum: Mollusca
- Class: Gastropoda
- Subclass: Caenogastropoda
- Order: Neogastropoda
- Family: Cancellariidae
- Genus: Brocchinia
- Species: B. azorica

Binomial name
- Brocchinia azorica (Bouchet & Warén, 1985)

Synonyms
- Admete azorica Bouchet & Warén, 1985

= Brocchinia azorica =

Species of gastropod

Brocchinia azorica is a species of sea snail, a marine gastropod mollusk in the family Cancellariidae, the nutmeg snails.

== Distribution ==
This marine species occurs off the Azores.
