= Brocchinia decapensis =

Scientific classification
- Kingdom: Animalia
- Phylum: Mollusca
- Class: Gastropoda
- Subclass: Caenogastropoda
- Order: Neogastropoda
- Family: Cancellariidae
- Genus: Brocchinia
- Species: B. decapensis

Binomial name
- Brocchinia decapensis (Barnard, 1960)

Synonyms
- Admete decapensis Barnard, 1960

Species of gastropod

Brocchinia decapensis is a species of sea snail, a marine gastropod mollusk in the family Cancellariidae, the nutmeg snails.
