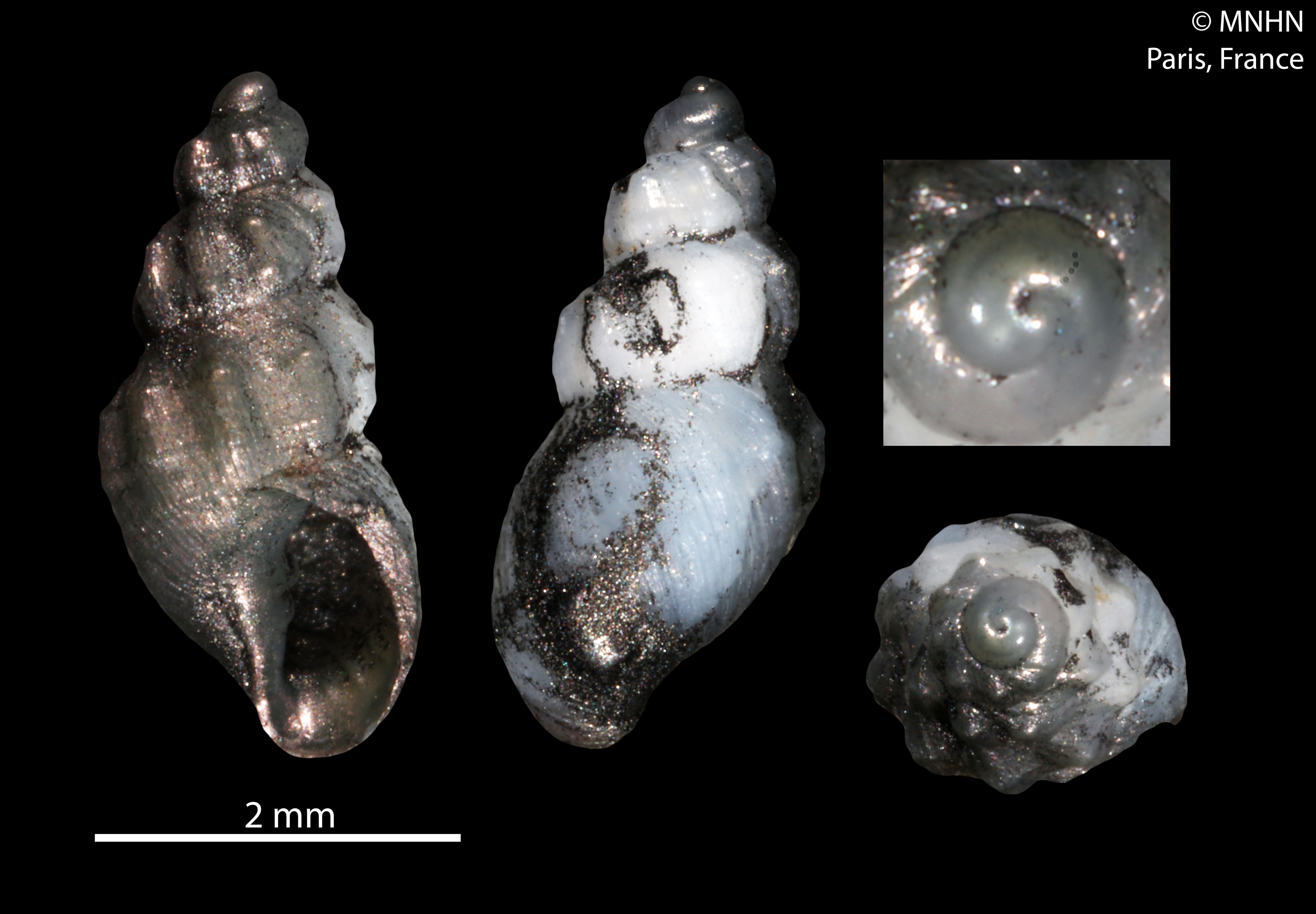
- Shell of Brocchinia canariensis

Scientific classification
- Kingdom: Animalia
- Phylum: Mollusca
- Class: Gastropoda
- Subclass: Caenogastropoda
- Order: Neogastropoda
- Superfamily: Volutoidea
- Family: Cancellariidae
- Genus: Brocchinia; Jousseaume, 1887{

Type species
- †Voluta mitraeformis Brocchi, 1814

Synonyms
- Anapepta Finlay, 1930; Solutosveltia Habe, 1961

= Brocchinia (gastropod) =

Genus of gastropods

Brocchinia is a genus of sea snails, marine gastropod mollusks in the family Cancellariidae, the nutmeg snails.

== Species ==
According to the World Register of Marine Species (WoRMS) the following species with a valid name are included within the genus Brocchinia :

- † Brocchinia anomala (P. Marshall & Murdoch, 1920)
- Brocchinia azorica (Bouchet & Warén, 1985)
- † Brocchinia bicarinata (Hoernes & Auinger, 1890)
- Brocchinia canariensis Rolán & Hernández, 2009
- Brocchinia clenchi Petit, 1986
- † Brocchinia culminata (Beu, 1970)
- Brocchinia decapensis (Barnard, 1960)
- Brocchinia exigua (E.A. Smith, 1891)
- † Brocchinia explicata (Laws, 1935)
- † Brocchinia finlayi (Marwick, 1931)
- Brocchinia fischeri (A. Adams, 1860)
- Brocchinia harasewychi de Barros & de Lima, 2007
- Brocchinia kaiensis Verhecken, 1997
- † Brocchinia lamellifera P. A. Maxwell, 1992
- † Brocchinia lestellensis Lozouet, 1999
- Brocchinia nodosa (Verrill & S. Smith, 1885)
- † Brocchinia nucleosa (Marwick, 1931)
- † Brocchinia petiti P. A. Maxwell, 1992
- Brocchinia pustulosa Verhecken, 1991
- Brocchinia septentrionalis (Finlay, 1930)
- † Brocchinia serrata (Laws, 1935)
- Brocchinia tanimbarensis Verhecken, 1997
- † Brocchinia tauroparva (Sacco, 1894)
- † Brocchinia tuberculifera (Laws, 1935)
- Brocchinia verheckeni de Barros & de Lima, 2007

Species brought into synonymy

- Brocchinia cornidei (Altimira, 1978) : synonym of Admetula cornidei (Altimira, 1978)
- Brocchinia pusilla (H. Adams, 1869) : synonym of Brocchinia clenchi Petit, 1986
