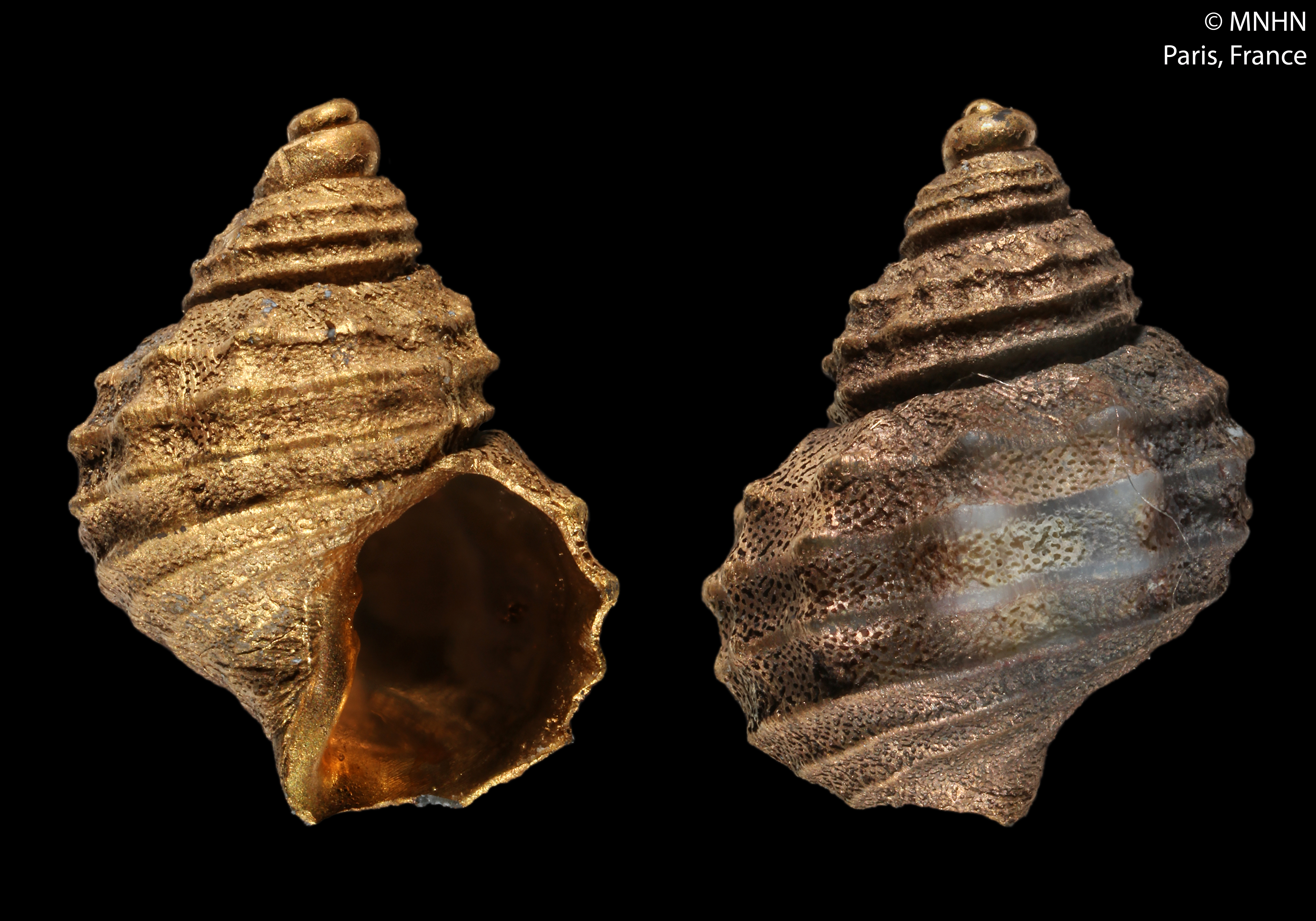

Scientific classification
- Kingdom: Animalia
- Phylum: Mollusca
- Class: Gastropoda
- Subclass: Caenogastropoda
- Order: Neogastropoda
- Family: Cancellariidae
- Genus: Brocchinia
- Species: B. kaiensis

Binomial name
- Brocchinia kaiensis Verhecken, 1997

= Brocchinia kaiensis =

Species of gastropod

Brocchinia kaiensis is a species of sea snail, a marine gastropod mollusk in the family Cancellariidae, the nutmeg snails.

== Distribution ==
This marine species occurs in the Arafura Sea, off Indonesia.
