= Brocchinia harasewychi =

Scientific classification
- Kingdom: Animalia
- Phylum: Mollusca
- Class: Gastropoda
- Subclass: Caenogastropoda
- Order: Neogastropoda
- Family: Cancellariidae
- Genus: Brocchinia
- Species: B. harasewychi

Binomial name
- Brocchinia harasewychi de Barros & de Lima, 2007

Species of gastropod

Brocchinia harasewychi is a species of sea snail, a marine gastropod mollusk in the family Cancellariidae, the nutmeg snails.
