= Brocchinia clenchi =

Scientific classification
- Kingdom: Animalia
- Phylum: Mollusca
- Class: Gastropoda
- Subclass: Caenogastropoda
- Order: Neogastropoda
- Family: Cancellariidae
- Genus: Brocchinia
- Species: B. clenchi

Binomial name
- Brocchinia clenchi Petit, 1986

Synonyms
- Cancellaria mitraeformis auct. non Brocchi, 1814; Brocchinia pusilla (Adams H., 1869) (preoccupied name); Cancellaria pusilla H. Adams, 1869 (non Sowerby, 1832)

Species of gastropod

Brocchinia clenchi is a species of sea snail, a marine gastropod mollusk in the family Cancellariidae, the nutmeg snails.
