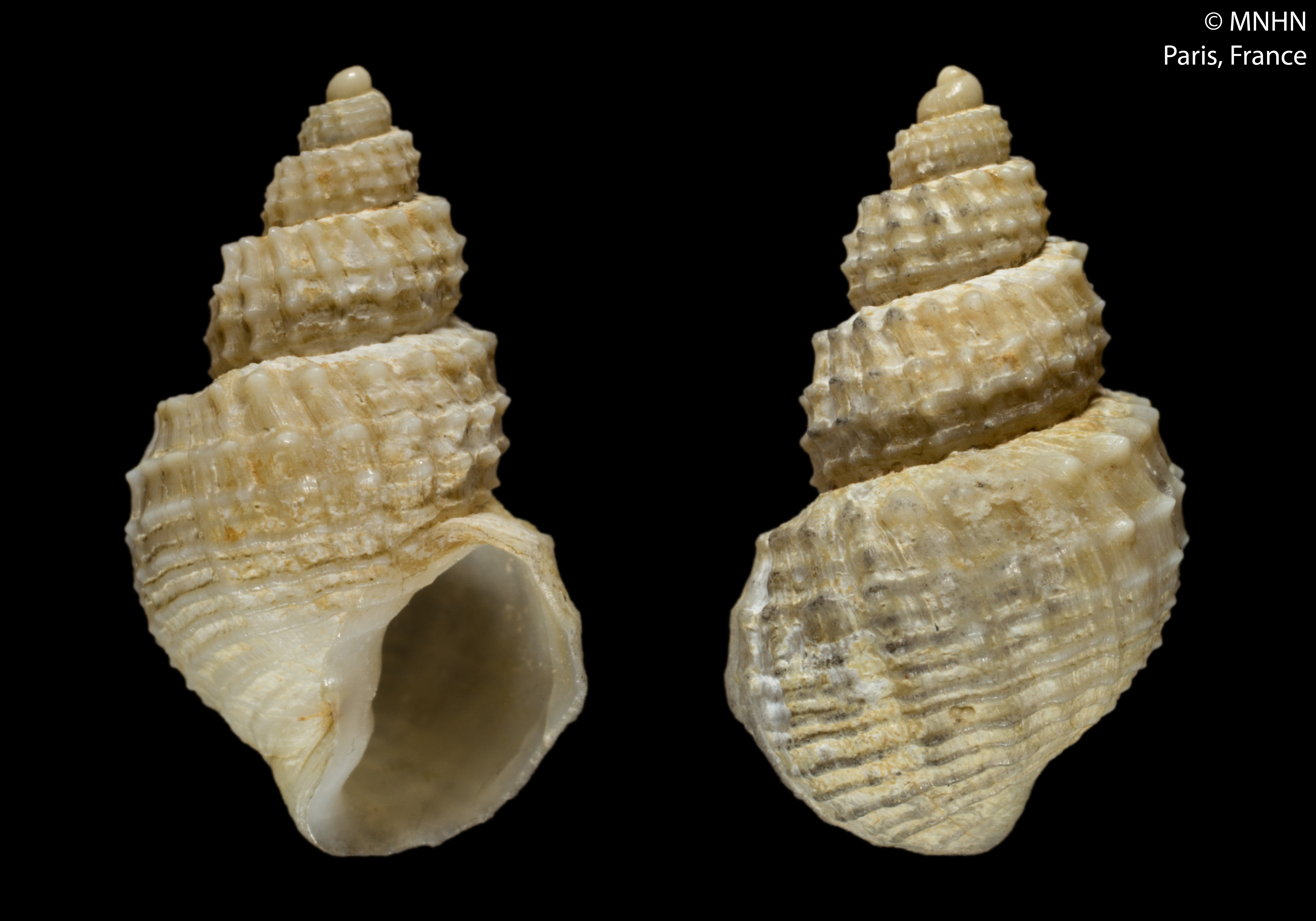

Scientific classification
- Kingdom: Animalia
- Phylum: Mollusca
- Class: Gastropoda
- Subclass: Caenogastropoda
- Order: Neogastropoda
- Family: Cancellariidae
- Genus: Brocchinia
- Species: B. pustulosa

Binomial name
- Brocchinia pustulosa Verhecken, 1991

= Brocchinia pustulosa =

Species of gastropod

Brocchinia pustulosa is a species of sea snail, a marine gastropod mollusk in the family Cancellariidae, the nutmeg snails.

== Distribution ==
This marine species occurs off Southeast Brazil.
