= Inglisella etheridgei =

Scientific classification
- Kingdom: Animalia
- Phylum: Mollusca
- Class: Gastropoda
- Subclass: Caenogastropoda
- Order: Neogastropoda
- Family: Cancellariidae
- Genus: Inglisella
- Species: I. etheridgei

Binomial name
- Inglisella etheridgei (Johnston, 1880)

Species of gastropod

Inglisella etheridgei is a species of sea snail, a marine gastropod mollusk in the family Cancellariidae, the nutmeg snails.

== Description ==
The shell grows to a length of 7 mm.

== Distribution ==
This marine species is found along Victoria, Australia.
