= Brocchinia tanimbarensis =

Scientific classification
- Kingdom: Animalia
- Phylum: Mollusca
- Class: Gastropoda
- Subclass: Caenogastropoda
- Order: Neogastropoda
- Family: Cancellariidae
- Genus: Brocchinia
- Species: B. tanimbarensis

Binomial name
- Brocchinia tanimbarensis Verhecken, 1997

Species of gastropod

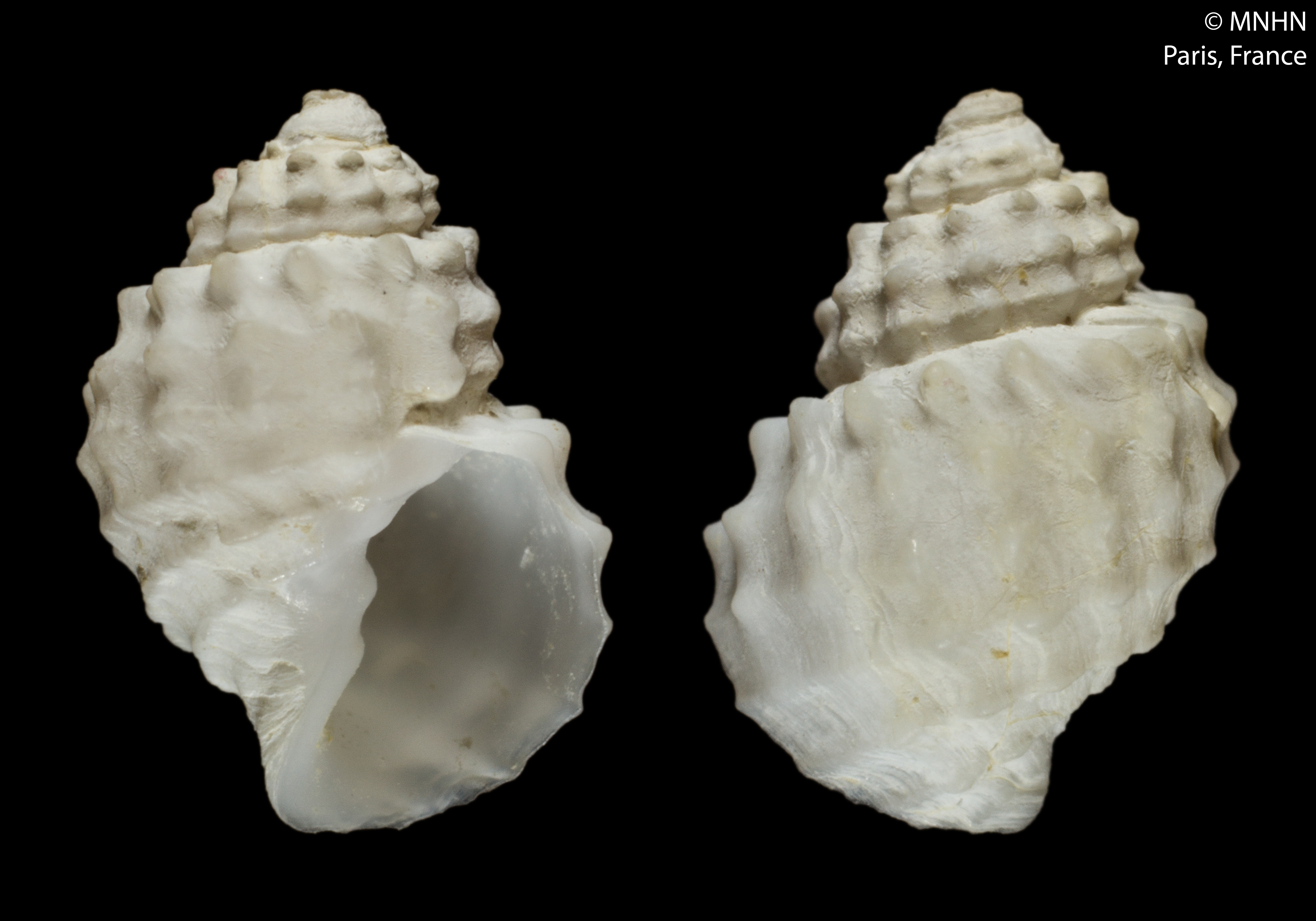
Brocchinia tanimbarensis

Brocchinia tanimbarensis is a species of sea snail, a marine gastropod mollusk in the family Cancellariidae, the nutmeg snails.

== Distribution ==
This marine species occurs off the Tanimbar Islands, Indonesia.
