= Brocchinia verheckeni =

Scientific classification
- Kingdom: Animalia
- Phylum: Mollusca
- Class: Gastropoda
- Subclass: Caenogastropoda
- Order: Neogastropoda
- Family: Cancellariidae
- Genus: Brocchinia
- Species: B. verheckeni

Binomial name
- Brocchinia verheckeni de Barros & de Lima, 2007

Species of gastropod

Brocchinia verheckeni is a species of sea snail, a marine gastropod mollusk in the family Cancellariidae, the nutmeg snails.
