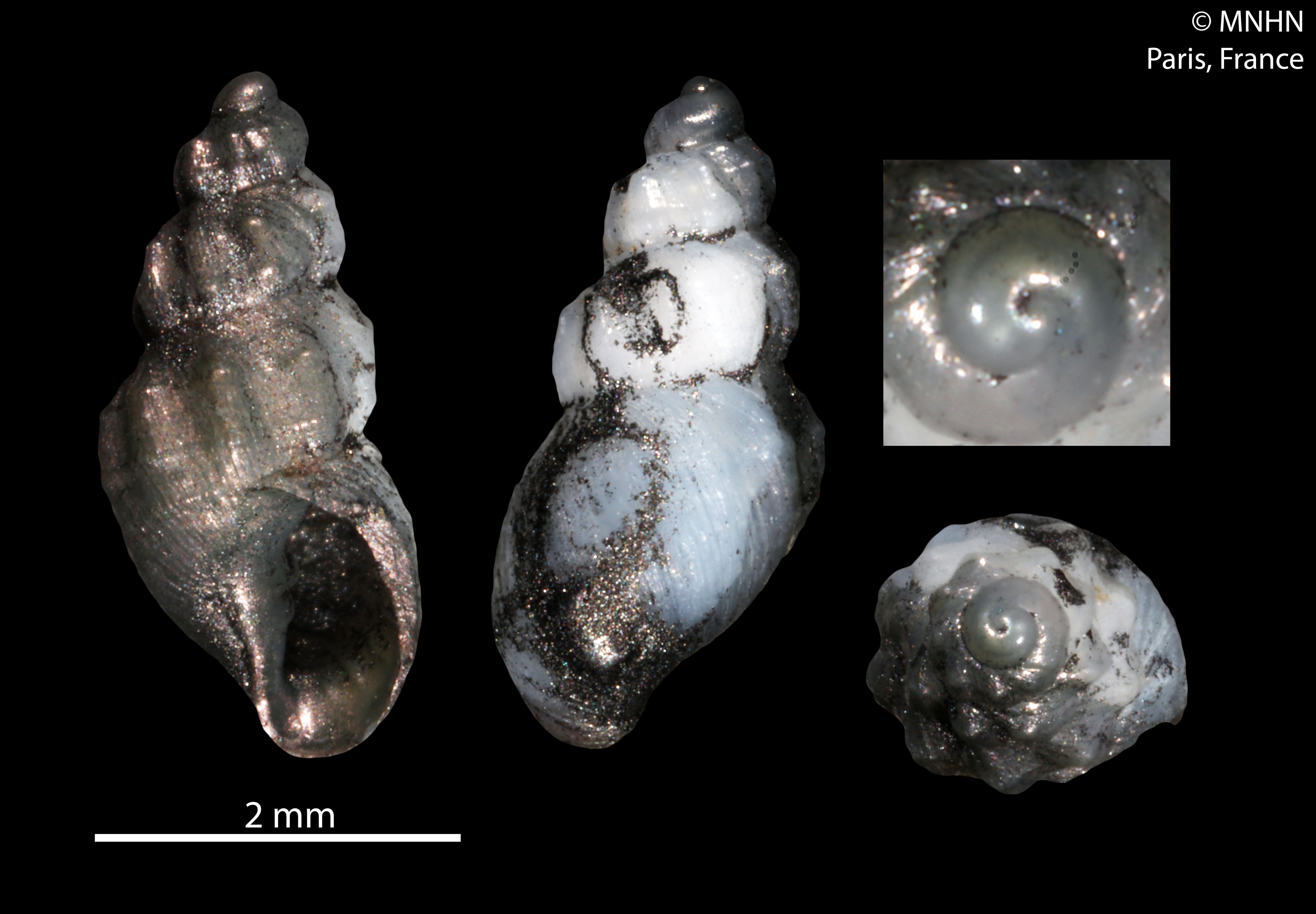
- Shell of Brocchinia canariensis (paratype at MNHN, Paris)

Scientific classification
- Kingdom: Animalia
- Phylum: Mollusca
- Class: Gastropoda
- Subclass: Caenogastropoda
- Order: Neogastropoda
- Family: Cancellariidae
- Genus: Brocchinia
- Species: B. canariensis

Binomial name
- Brocchinia canariensis Rolan & Hernandez, 2009

= Brocchinia canariensis =

Species of gastropod

Brocchinia canariensis is a species of sea snail, a marine gastropod mollusk in the family Cancellariidae, the nutmeg snails.

== Distribution ==
This marine species occurs off the Canary Islands.
