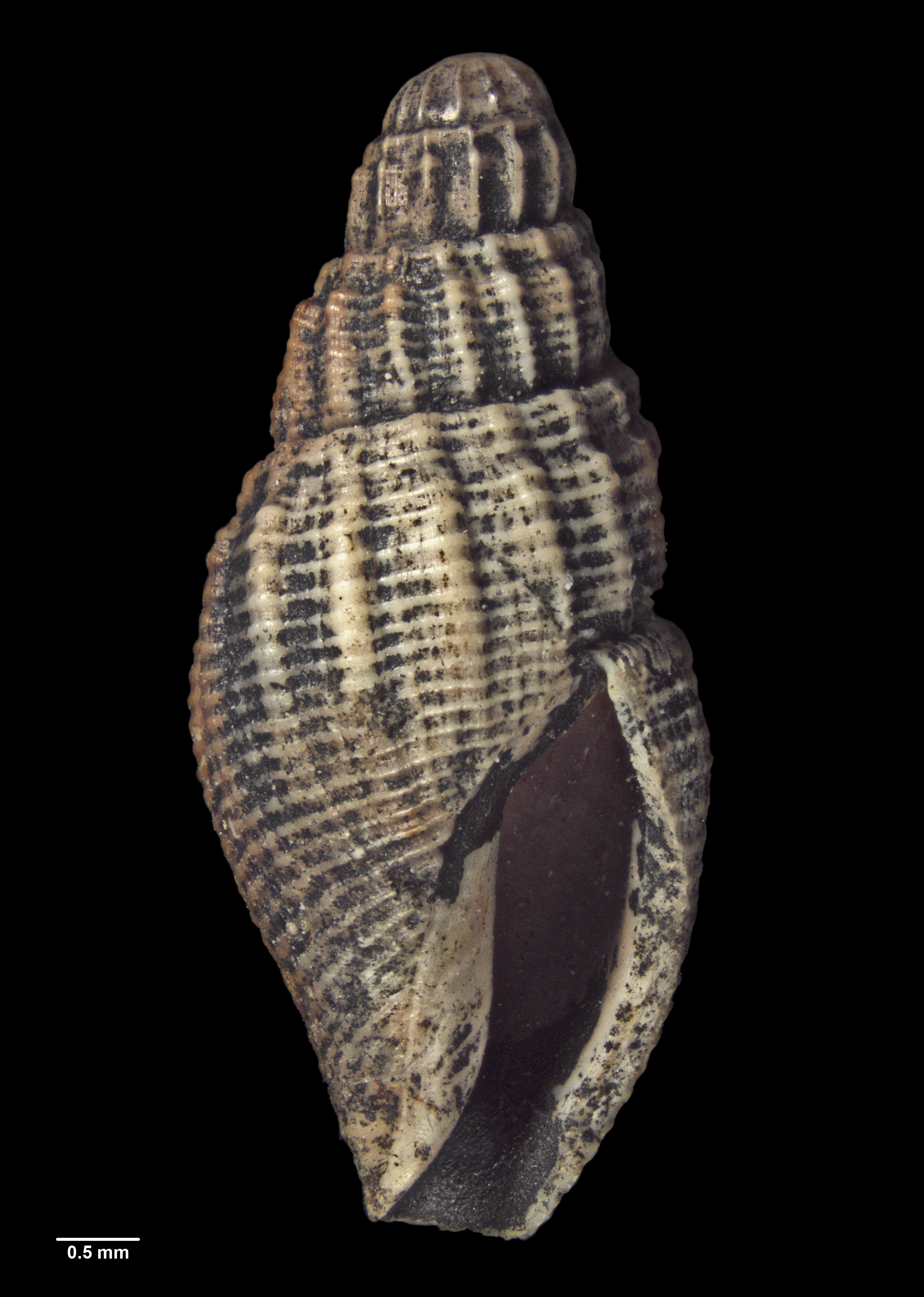
- Holotype

Scientific classification
- Kingdom: Animalia
- Phylum: Mollusca
- Class: Gastropoda
- Subclass: Caenogastropoda
- Order: Neogastropoda
- Superfamily: Conoidea
- Genus: †Syngenochilus
- Species: †S. radiapex

Binomial name
- †Syngenochilus radiapex A. W. B. Powell, 1944

= Syngenochilus radiapex =

Extinct species of gastropod

Syngenochilus radiapex is an extinct species of sea snail, a marine gastropod mollusc, in the superfamily Conoidea, currently unassigned to a family. Dating to the early Oligocene to the early Miocene, fossils of the species have been found in the Otway Basin and Port Phillip Basin of Victoria, Australia.

== Description ==
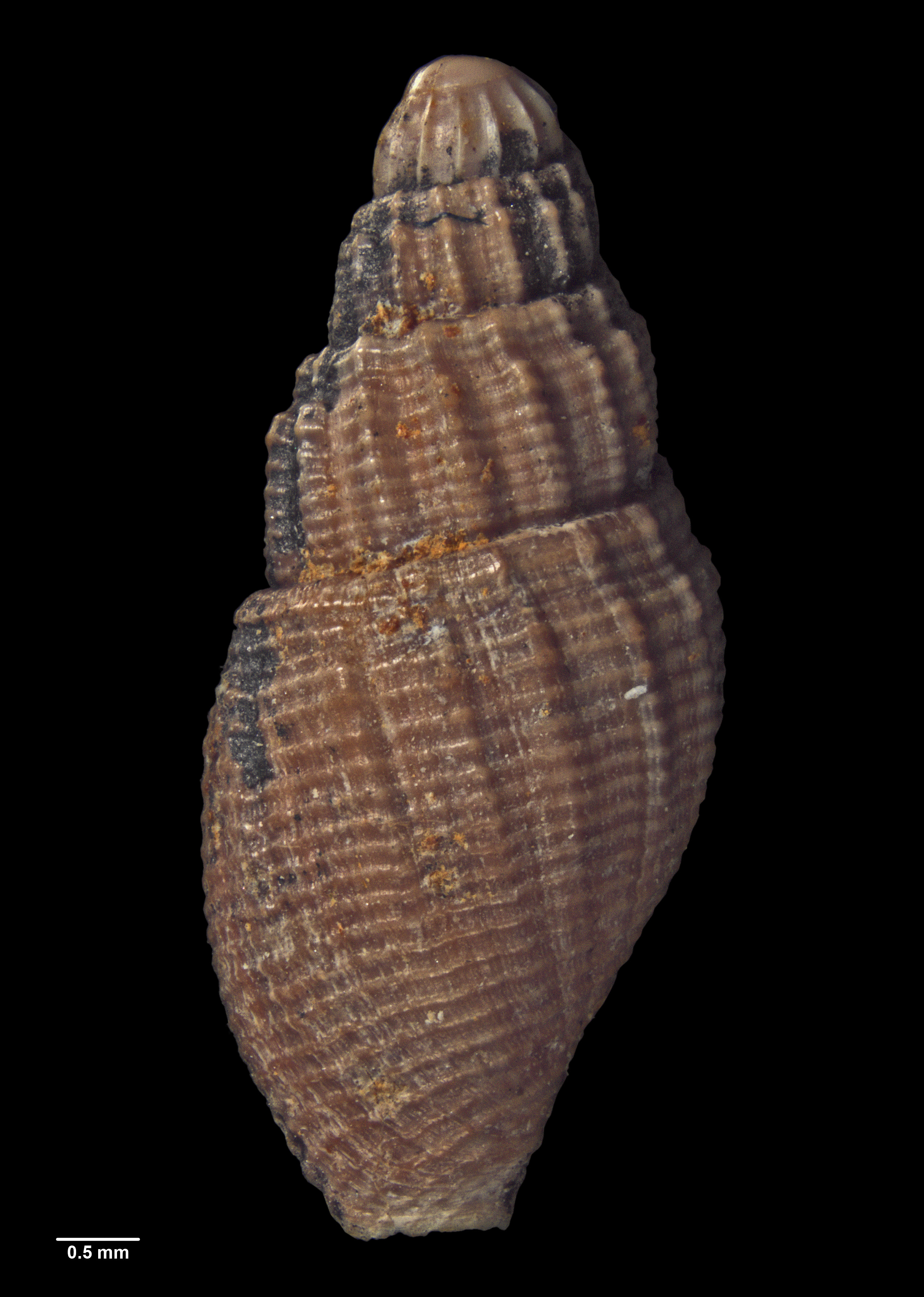
Reverse view of holotype

In the original description, Powell described the species as follows:

Shell small, robust, ovate, with bluntly rounded apex. The sculpture consists of heavy rounded axials crossed by narrow spiral cords. The outline of the spire-whorls is stepped at the subsutural sulcus, below which it is straight and vertical. Aperture narrow, about half height of shell. Protoconch large, broad, dome-shaped, flattened on top, of two whorls, first smooth, second with 14 strong, regularly spaced axial ribs. Post-nuclear whorls sculptured with 14 strong rounded axials, vertical to slightly recurrently oblique, extending from suture to suture, but rapidly fading out on base. All post-nuclear whorls crossed by crisp, narrow spiral cords, 10 on spire-whorls and 28 on body-whorl. There are four or five characteristic weak Daphnellid plications on the inner side of the pillar.

The species has a protoconch with a flat first whorl, and the axial sculpture noted by Powell appears to disappear with age. The holotype measured 7.25 mm (0.285 in) in height and 3.25 mm (0.128 in) in diameter, but likely is of a specimen that had not fully grown. Other specimens have been identified with heights ranging between 6–14.5 mm (0.24–0.57 in), and diameters of between 3–5.5 mm (0.12–0.22 in).

== Taxonomy ==
The species was first described by A. W. B. Powell in 1944 as the type species of the genus Syngenochilus, also described in the same paper. The holotype is held by the Auckland War Memorial Museum.

== Distribution ==
S. radiapex is found in fossil beds of the Otway Basin and Port Phillip Basin in Victoria, Australia, including the Glen Aire Clay, Jan Juc formation, Puebla Formation and Bird Rock Cliffs, Torquay. Fossils of this species have been dated to between the early Oligocene to the early Miocene.
