= Brocchinia fischeri =

Scientific classification
- Kingdom: Animalia
- Phylum: Mollusca
- Class: Gastropoda
- Subclass: Caenogastropoda
- Order: Neogastropoda
- Family: Cancellariidae
- Genus: Brocchinia
- Species: B. fischeri

Binomial name
- Brocchinia fischeri (A. Adams, 1860)

Synonyms
- Cancellaria fischeri A. Adams, 1860; Solutosveltia abyssicola Habe, 1961

Species of gastropod

Brocchinia fischeri is a species of sea snail, a marine gastropod mollusk in the family Cancellariidae, the nutmeg snails.
