= Brocchinia exigua =

Scientific classification
- Kingdom: Animalia
- Phylum: Mollusca
- Class: Gastropoda
- Subclass: Caenogastropoda
- Order: Neogastropoda
- Family: Cancellariidae
- Genus: Brocchinia
- Species: B. exigua

Binomial name
- Brocchinia exigua (E.A. Smith, 1891)

Synonyms
- Cancellaria exigua E.A. Smith, 1891; Inglisella nympha Garrard, 1975

Species of gastropod

Brocchinia exigua is a species of sea snail, a marine gastropod mollusk in the family Cancellariidae, the nutmeg snails.
