= Brocchinia septentrionalis =

Scientific classification
- Kingdom: Animalia
- Phylum: Mollusca
- Class: Gastropoda
- Subclass: Caenogastropoda
- Order: Neogastropoda
- Family: Cancellariidae
- Genus: Brocchinia
- Species: B. septentrionalis

Binomial name
- Brocchinia septentrionalis (Finlay, 1930)

Synonyms
- Inglisella septentrionalis Finlay, 1930 (basionym)

Species of gastropod

Brocchinia septentrionalis is a species of sea snail, a marine gastropod mollusk in the family Cancellariidae, the nutmeg snails. the sea snail was known as Inglisella septentrionalis prior to being reclassified.

== Description ==
The shell grows to a height of 5mm, and up to a width of 2.8mm.

== Distribution ==
This Endemic marine species is found along the Eastern coast of Dunedin, New Zealand & North Cape, New Zealand and is found up to a depth of 140 meters (460ft)
