= Inglisella marwicki =

Scientific classification
- Kingdom: Animalia
- Phylum: Mollusca
- Class: Gastropoda
- Subclass: Caenogastropoda
- Order: Neogastropoda
- Family: Cancellariidae
- Genus: Inglisella
- Species: I. marwicki

Binomial name
- Inglisella marwicki Dell, 1956

Synonyms
- Waipaoa marwicki Dell, 1956

Marine gastropod

Inglisella marwicki (formerly called Waipaoa marwicki) is a species of sea snail in the family Cancellariidae, the nutmeg snails. It is found in the Exclusive economic zone of New Zealand.
