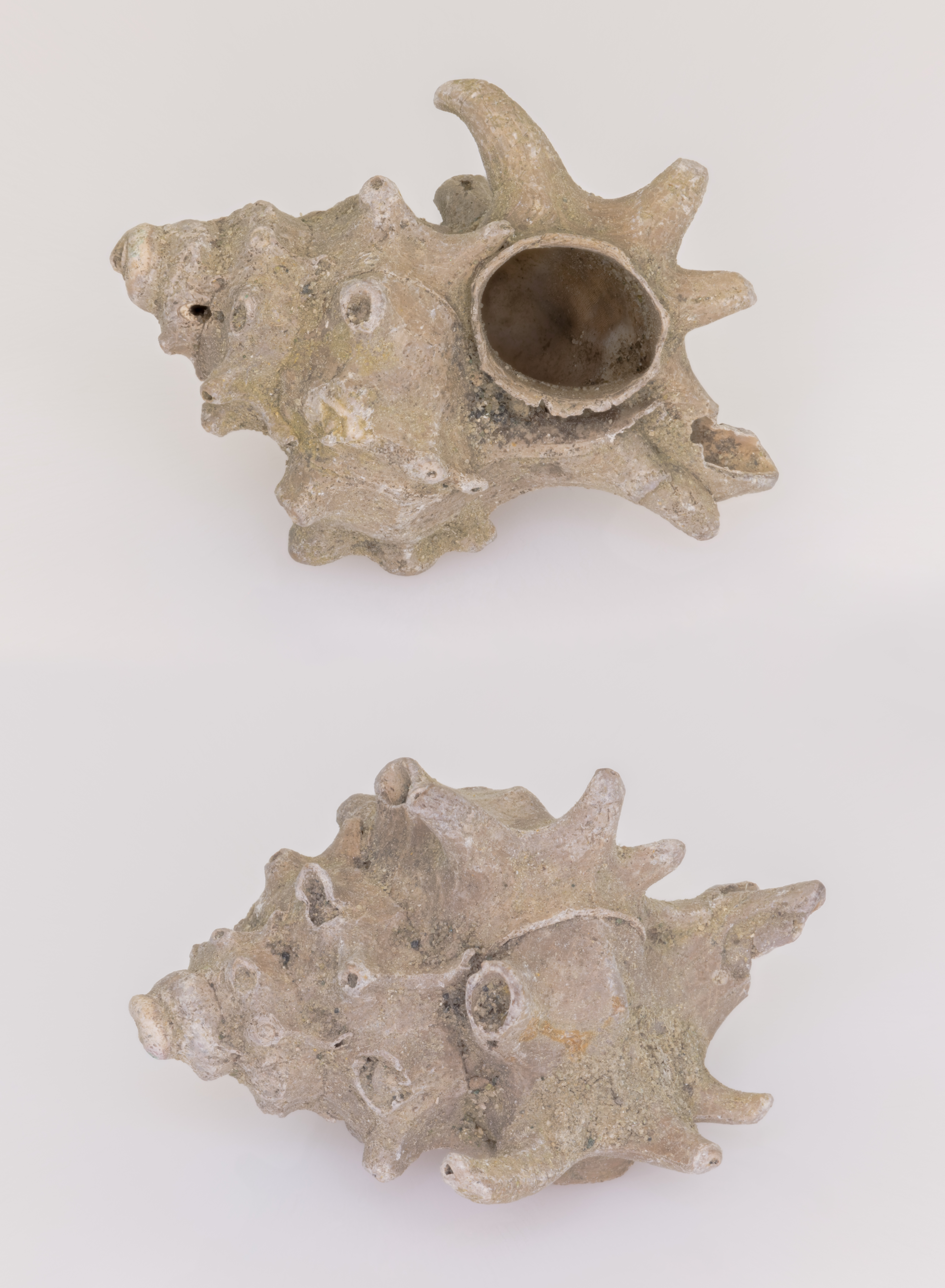
- Typhis

Scientific classification
- Kingdom: Animalia
- Phylum: Mollusca
- Class: Gastropoda
- Subclass: Caenogastropoda
- Order: Neogastropoda
- Superfamily: Muricoidea
- Family: Muricidae
- Subfamily: Typhinae
- Genus: Typhis; Montfort, 1810

Type species
- † Purpura tubifer Bruguière, 1792

Synonyms
- Murex (Typhis) Montfort, 1810; † Typhis (Neotyphis) Vella, 1961 · alternate representation; Typhis (Typhis) Montfort, 1810 · alternate representation

= Typhis =

Genus of gastropods

Typhis is a genus of sea snails, marine gastropod mollusks in the family Muricidae, the murex snails or rock snails.

== Species ==
Species within the genus Typhis include:

- † Typhis aculeatus Vella, 1961
- † Typhis adventus Vella, 1961
- † Typhis bantamensis Oostingh, 1933
- † Typhis chattonensis P. A. Maxwell, 1971
- † Typhis clifdenensis Vella, 1961
- † Typhis cuniculosus Duchâtel in Bronn, 1848
- † Typhis gabbi Brown & Pilsbry, 1911
- † Typhis hebetatus Hutton, 1877
- Typhis phillipensis Watson, 1883
- † Typhis planus Vella, 1961
- † Typhis ramosus Habe & Kosuge, 1971
- † Typhis sejunctus Semper, 1861
- † Typhis tubifer Bruguière, 1792
- Typhis wellsi Houart, 1985
- Typhis westaustralis Houart, 1991

Synonyms

- † Typhis coronarius Deshayes, 1865: synonym of †Laevityphis muticus (J. de C. Sowerby, 1835)
- † Typhis francescae Finlay, 1924: synonym of † Rugotyphis francescae (Finlay, 1924) (original combination)
- Typhis trispinosus (Houart, 1991): synonym of Hirtotyphis trispinosus Houart, 1991
- Typhis tityrus Bayer, 1971: synonym of Trubatsa tityrus (Bayer, 1971) (basionym)
- Typhis tosaensis Azuma, 1960: synonym of Monstrotyphis tosaensis (M. Azuma, 1960)
