= Typhis hebetatus =

Scientific classification
- Kingdom: Animalia
- Phylum: Mollusca
- Class: Gastropoda
- Subclass: Caenogastropoda
- Order: Neogastropoda
- Superfamily: Muricoidea
- Family: Muricidae
- Subfamily: Typhinae
- Genus: Typhis
- Species: †T. hebetatus

Binomial name
- †Typhis hebetatus Hutton, 1877

Extinct species of gastropod

Typhis hebetatus is an extinct species of sea snail, a marine gastropod mollusk, in the family Muricidae, the murex snails or rock snails. It was 25–35 mm long, and is visually similar to Typhis adventus, though is more slender and has two variceal spines.

== Distribution ==
This species occurs in New Zealand.
