= Typhina =

- Typhina belcheri

Scientific classification
- Kingdom: Animalia
- Phylum: Mollusca
- Class: Gastropoda
- Subclass: Caenogastropoda
- Order: Neogastropoda
- Superfamily: Muricoidea
- Family: Muricidae
- Subfamily: Typhinae
- Genus: Typhina; Jousseaume, 1880

Type species
- Typhis belcheri Broderip, 1833

Synonyms
- Talityphis Jousseaume, 1882 (junior synonym); Typhis (Talityphis) Jousseaume, 1881; Typhis (Typhina) Jousseaume, 1880; Typhis (Typhisopsis) Jousseaume, 1880; Typhisala Jousseaume, 1882 (junior synonym); Typhisopsis Jousseaume, 1880

Genus of gastropods

Typhina is a genus of sea snails, marine gastropod mollusks in the subfamily Typhinae of the family Muricidae, the murex snails or rock snails.

It was first described by Félix Pierre Jousseaume in 1880.

== Species ==
Species within the genus Typhina include:

- † Typhina alata (Sowerby, 1850 )
- Typhina belcheri (Broderip, 1833)
- Typhina campbelli (Radwin & D'Attilio, 1976)
- † Typhina canaliculata Landau & Houart, 2014
- Typhina carolskoglundae (Houart & Hertz, 2006)
- Typhina clarki (Keen & G. B. Campbell, 1964)
- Typhina clarksoni Houart, Buge & Zuccon, 2021
- Typhina claydoni (Houart, 1988)
- Typhina coronata (Broderip, 1833)
- † Typhina cryptica Merle & Pacaud, 2019
- Typhina expansa (G.B. Sowerby II, 1874)
- Typhina gabonensis (Garrigues, 2021)
- Typhina grandis (A. Adams, 1855)
- Typhina lamyi (Garrigues & Merle, 2014)
- Typhina latipennis (Dall, 1919)
- Typhina neocaledonica (Houart, 1987)
- Typhina nitens (Hinds, 1843)
- Typhina pallida (Garrigues, 2021)
- Typhina puertoricensis (Warmke, 1964)
- † Typhina radulfiensis Merle & Pacaud, 2019
- † Typhina rutoti (Cossmann, 1882)
- † Typhina subburdigalensis Lozouet, 1999

Synonyms

- Typhina pavlova Iredale, 1936: synonym of Choreotyphis pavlova (Iredale, 1936) (original combination)
- Typhina ramosa (Habe & Kosuge, 1971): synonym of Typhis ramosus Habe & Kosuge, 1971
- Typhina riosi Bertsch & D'Attilio, 1980: synonym of Siphonochelus riosi (Bertsch & D'Attilio, 1980) (original combination)
