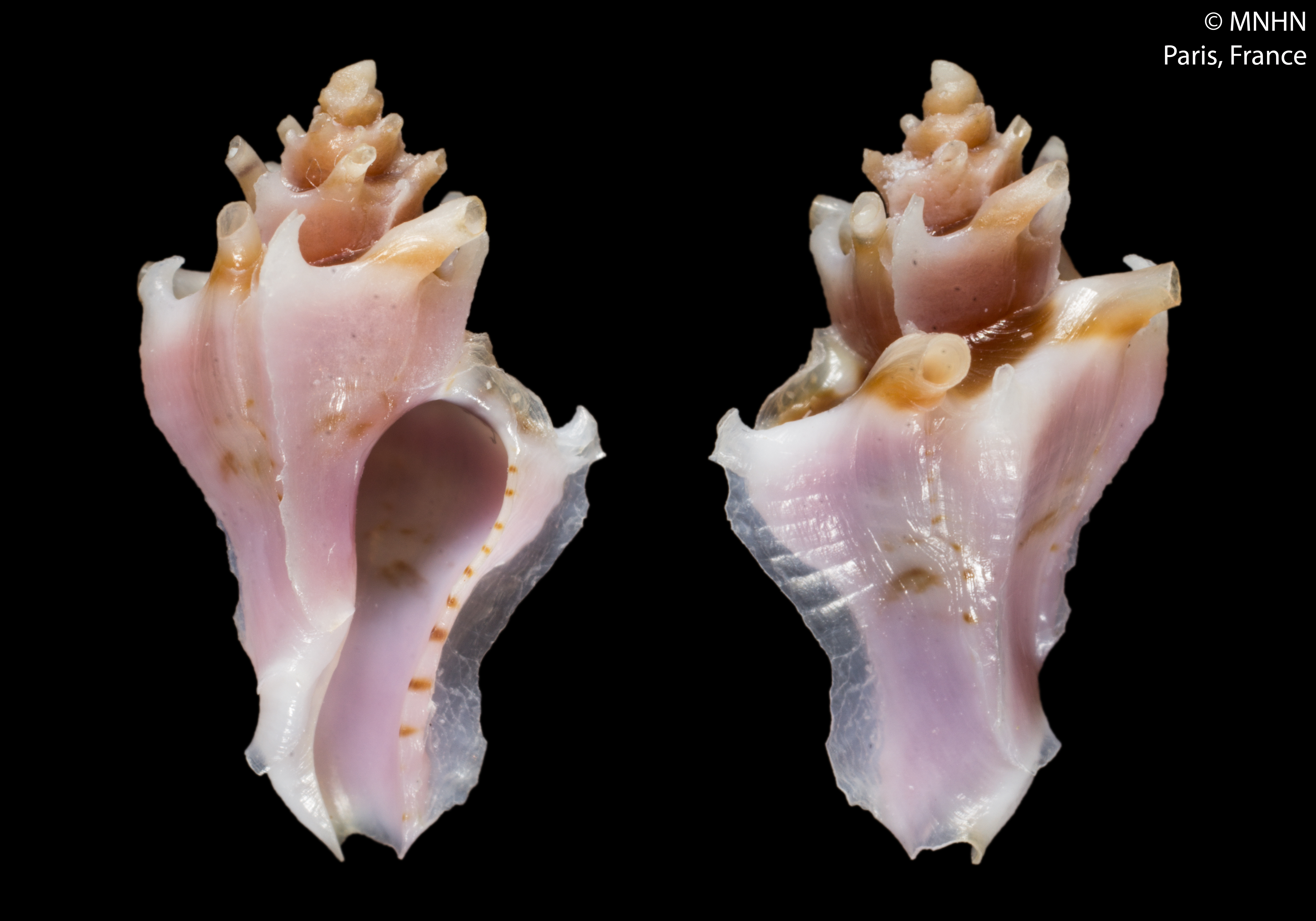
- Shell of Typhinellus mirbatensis (holotype at MNHN, Paris)

Scientific classification
- Kingdom: Animalia
- Phylum: Mollusca
- Class: Gastropoda
- Subclass: Caenogastropoda
- Order: Neogastropoda
- Family: Muricidae
- Subfamily: Typhinae
- Genus: Typhinellus
- Species: T. mirbatensis

Binomial name
- Typhinellus mirbatensis Houart, Gori & Rosado, 2015

= Typhinellus mirbatensis =

Species of gastropod

Typhinellus mirbatensis is a species of sea snail, a marine gastropod mollusk, in the family Muricidae, the murex snails or rock snails.

== Description ==
The length of the shell attains 15.7 mm at maturity. Their shell is a light pink, with a greyish white intricalax, There’s also a dark brown subsutural band and small dark brown dots on the shell. Their shell is lightly built, broadly angulate and nearly smooth.

== Distribution and habitat ==
This species occurs in Omani part of the Arabian Sea. This species lives 10 to 22 meters below and dwells on flat rocks with have a thin layer of sand and seaweed.
