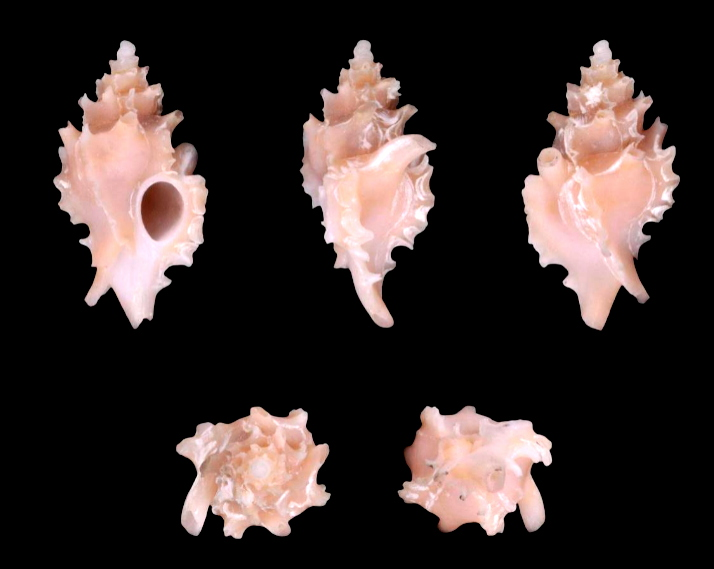
- Shell of Typhina nitens (specimen at the Smithsonian Institution)

Scientific classification
- Kingdom: Animalia
- Phylum: Mollusca
- Class: Gastropoda
- Subclass: Caenogastropoda
- Order: Neogastropoda
- Family: Muricidae
- Subfamily: Typhinae
- Genus: Typhina
- Species: T. nitens

Binomial name
- Typhina nitens (Hinds, 1843)

Synonyms
- Talityphis bengalensis Radwin & D'Attilio, 1976; Typhis (Talityphis) bengalensis (Radwin & D'Attilio, 1976) · unaccepted; Typhis bengalensis (Radwin & D'Attilio, 1976) ·; Typhis nitens Hinds, 1843

= Typhina nitens =

Species of gastropod

Typhina nitens is a species of sea snail, a marine gastropod mollusk in the family of Muricidae, the murex snails or rock snails.

== Description ==
The length of the shell attains 12 mm (0.47 in).

== Distribution ==
This marine species occurs off the Philippines, Bay of Bengal and in the Makassar Strait.

== Sources ==
- Houart, R.; Buge, B.; Zuccon, D. (2021). "A taxonomic update of the Typhinae (Gastropoda: Muricidae) with a review of New Caledonia species and the description of new species from New Caledonia, the South China Sea and Western Australia". Journal of Conchology. 44(2): 103–147.
