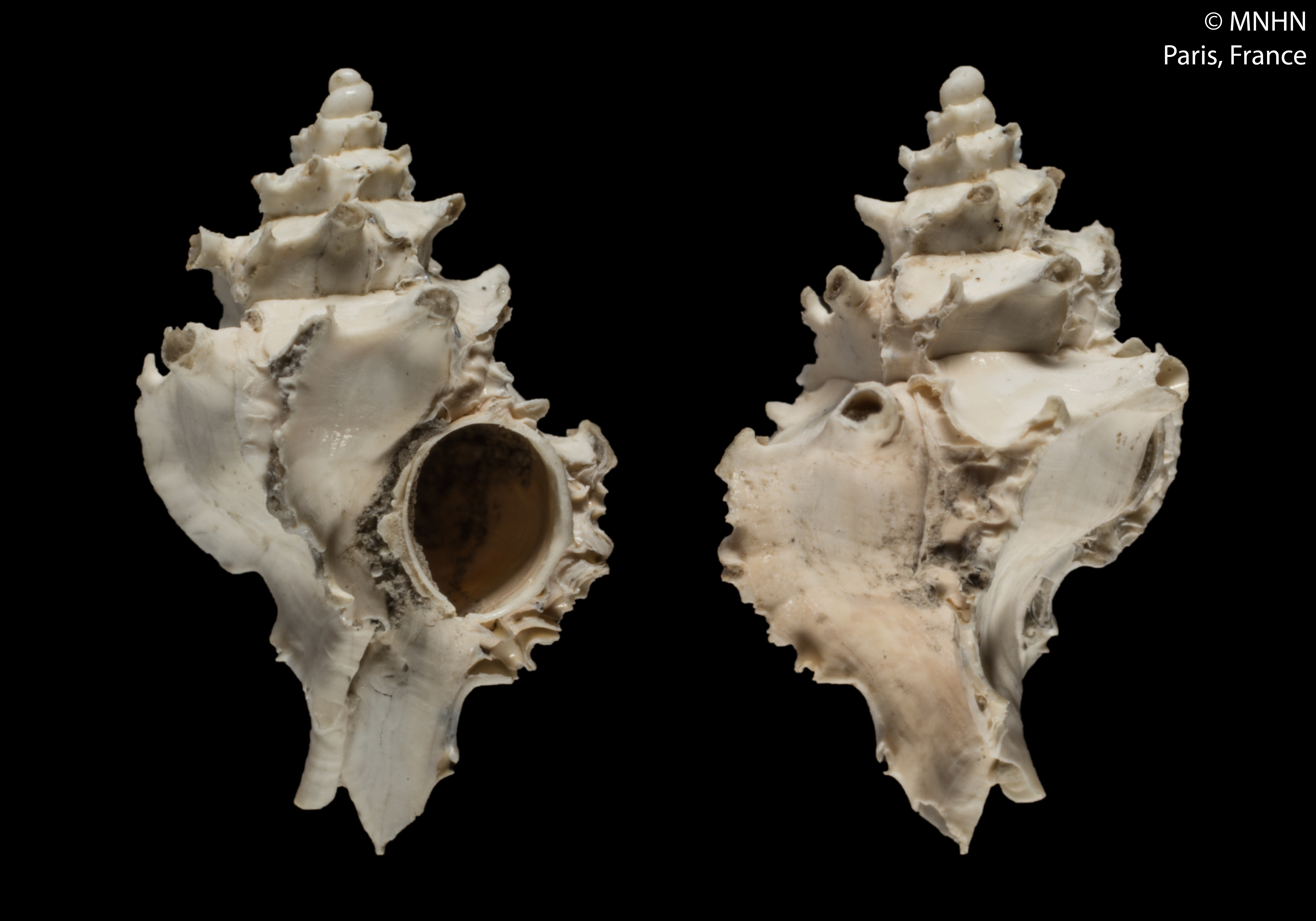
- Shell of Typhina subburdigalensis (holotype at MNHN, Paris)

Scientific classification
- Kingdom: Animalia
- Phylum: Mollusca
- Class: Gastropoda
- Subclass: Caenogastropoda
- Order: Neogastropoda
- Superfamily: Muricoidea
- Family: Muricidae
- Subfamily: Typhinae
- Genus: Typhina
- Species: †T. subburdigalensis

Binomial name
- †Typhina subburdigalensis Lozouet, 1999

= Typhina subburdigalensis =

Extinct species of gastropod

Typhina subburdigalensis is an extinct species of sea snail, a marine gastropod mollusk, in the family Muricidae, the murex snails or rock snails.

== Distribution ==
This extinct species occurs in France.
