= Laevityphis ludbrookae =

Scientific classification
- Kingdom: Animalia
- Phylum: Mollusca
- Class: Gastropoda
- Subclass: Caenogastropoda
- Order: Neogastropoda
- Superfamily: Muricoidea
- Family: Muricidae
- Subfamily: Typhinae
- Genus: Laevityphis
- Species: †L. ludbrookae

Binomial name
- †Laevityphis ludbrookae Keen & G. B. Campbell, 1964

Extinct species of gastropod

Laevityphis ludbrookae is an extinct species of sea snail, a marine gastropod mollusk, in the family Muricidae, the murex snails or rock snails.
