= Typhinellus chipolanus =

Scientific classification
- Kingdom: Animalia
- Phylum: Mollusca
- Class: Gastropoda
- Subclass: Caenogastropoda
- Order: Neogastropoda
- Superfamily: Muricoidea
- Family: Muricidae
- Subfamily: Typhinae
- Genus: Typhinellus
- Species: †T. chipolanus

Binomial name
- †Typhinellus chipolanus (Gertman, 1969)

Extinct species of gastropod

Typhinellus chipolanus is an extinct species of sea snail, a marine gastropod mollusk, in the family Muricidae, the murex snails or rock snails.
