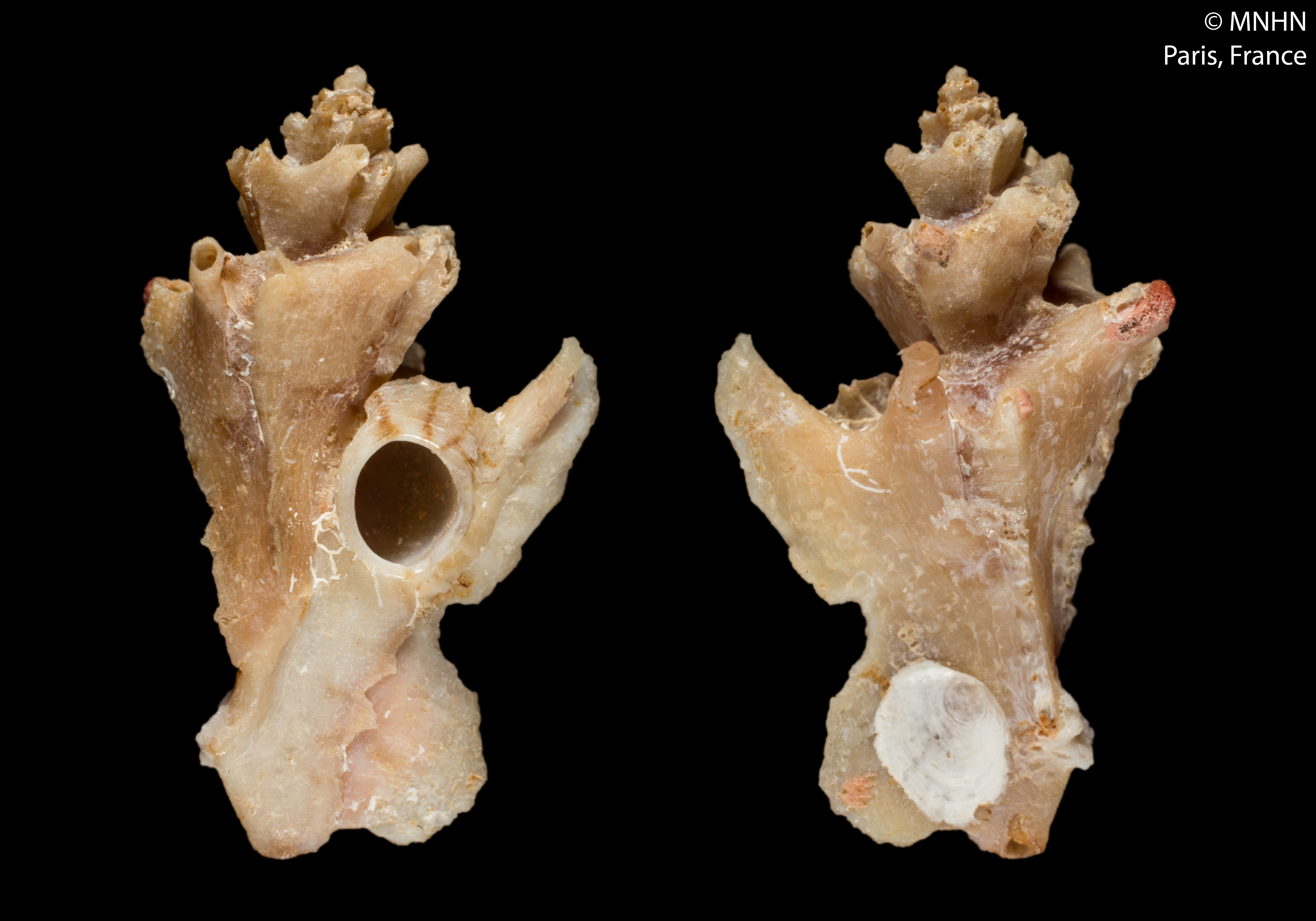
- Shell of Typhinellus constrictus (paratype at MNHN, Paris)

Scientific classification
- Kingdom: Animalia
- Phylum: Mollusca
- Class: Gastropoda
- Subclass: Caenogastropoda
- Order: Neogastropoda
- Superfamily: Muricoidea
- Family: Muricidae
- Subfamily: Typhinae
- Genus: Typhinellus
- Species: T. constrictus

Binomial name
- Typhinellus constrictus Houart & Héros, 2015

= Typhinellus constrictus =

Species of gastropod

Typhinellus constrictus is a species of sea snail, a marine gastropod mollusk, in the family Muricidae, the murex snails or rock snails.

== Distribution ==
This species occurs in Madagascar.
