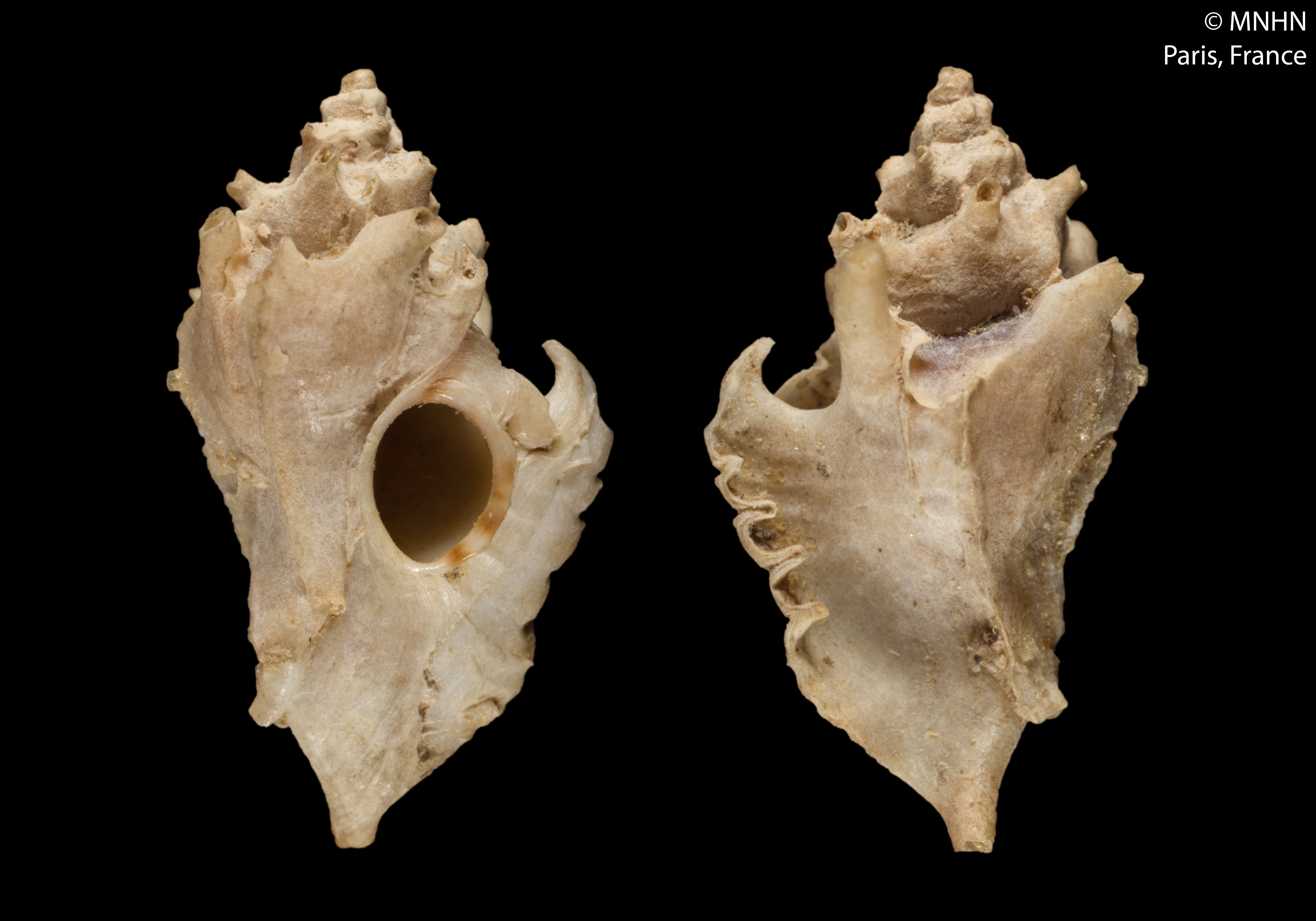
- Shell of Typhinellus labiatus (lectotype at MNHN, Paris)

Scientific classification
- Kingdom: Animalia
- Phylum: Mollusca
- Class: Gastropoda
- Subclass: Caenogastropoda
- Order: Neogastropoda
- Family: Muricidae
- Subfamily: Typhinae
- Genus: Typhinellus
- Species: T. labiatus

Binomial name
- Typhinellus labiatus (de Cristofori & Jan 1832)

Synonyms
- Murex fistulatus Risso, 1826; Murex labiatus Cristofori & Jan 1832µ; Murex syphonellus Bonelli in Bellardi & Michelloti, 1841; Murex tetrapterus Bronn, 1838; Typhinellus sowerbyi (Broderip, 1833); Typhis (Siphonochelus) recens Nordsieck, 1972; Typhis (Typhinellus) tetrapterus Bronn, 1838; Typhis (Typhinellus) tetrapterus var. protetrapterus Sacco, 1890; Typhis sowerbyi Broderip, 1833; Typhis sowerbyi elongatus Settepassi, 1977; Typhis sowerbyi var. fulva Pallary, 1906; Typhis sowerbyi var. minor Pallary, 1906

= Typhinellus labiatus =

Species of gastropod

Typhinellus labiatus is a species of sea snail, a marine gastropod mollusk in the family Muricidae, the murex snails or rock snails.

== Description ==
The length of the shell attains 21 mm.

== Distribution ==
This species occurs in the Mediterranean Sea.
