= Rugotyphis vellai =

Scientific classification
- Kingdom: Animalia
- Phylum: Mollusca
- Class: Gastropoda
- Subclass: Caenogastropoda
- Order: Neogastropoda
- Superfamily: Muricoidea
- Family: Muricidae
- Subfamily: Typhinae
- Genus: †Rugotyphis
- Species: †R. vellai

Binomial name
- †Rugotyphis vellai (Maxwell, 1971)

Extinct species of gastropod

Rugotyphis vellai is an extinct species of sea snail, a marine gastropod mollusk, in the family Muricidae, the murex snails or rock snails.

== Distribution ==
This species occurs in New Zealand.
