= Laevityphis tepungai =

Scientific classification
- Kingdom: Animalia
- Phylum: Mollusca
- Class: Gastropoda
- Subclass: Caenogastropoda
- Order: Neogastropoda
- Superfamily: Muricoidea
- Family: Muricidae
- Subfamily: Typhinae
- Genus: Laevityphis
- Species: †L. tepungai

Binomial name
- †Laevityphis tepungai (C. A. Fleming, 1943)

Synonyms
- † Typhis tepungai C. A. Fleming, 1943

Extinct species of gastropod

Laevityphis tepungai is an extinct species of sea snail, a marine gastropod mollusk, in the family Muricidae, the murex snails or rock snails.

== Distribution ==
This species occurs in New Zealand.
