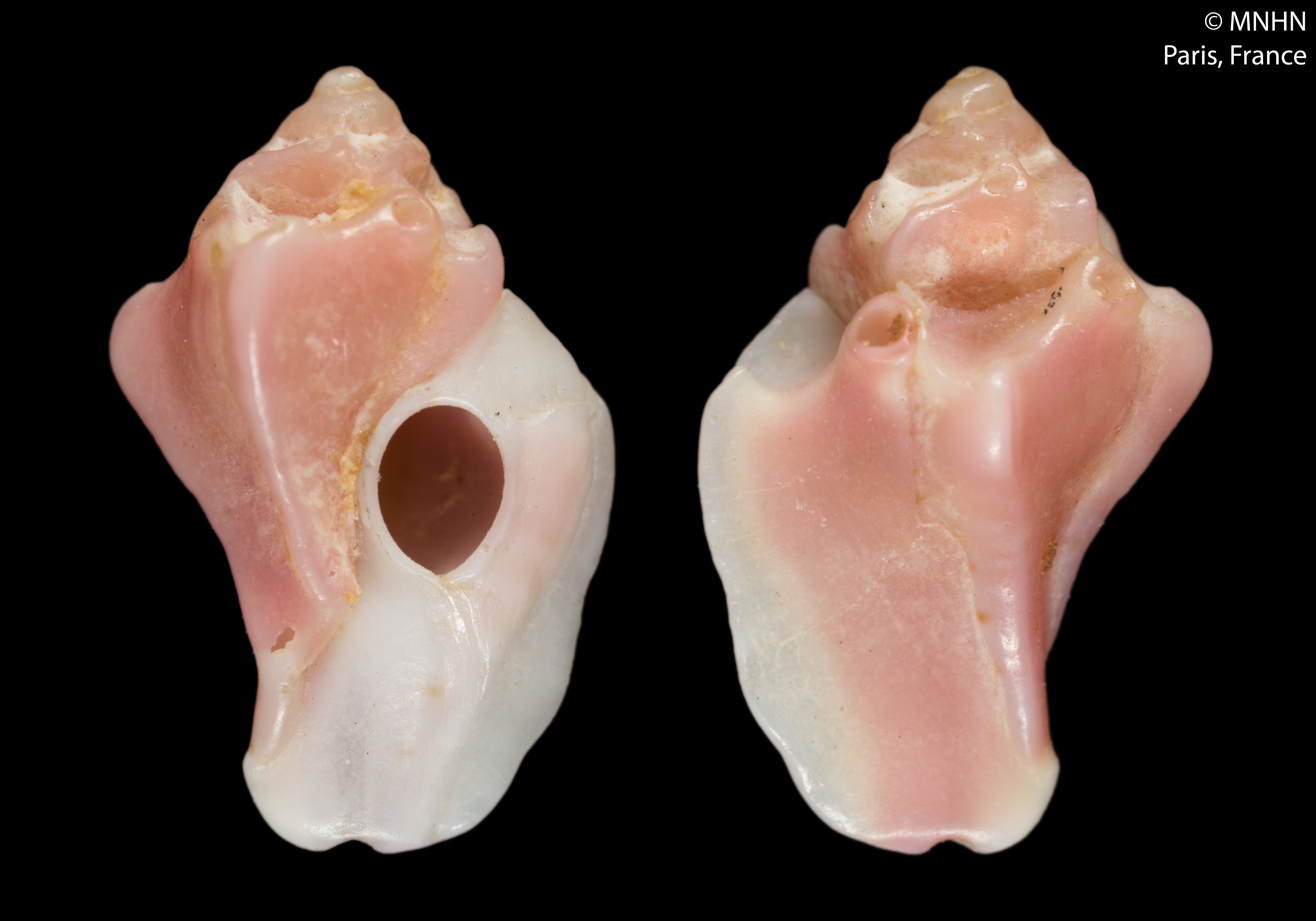
- Shell of Typhinellus androyensis (holotype at MNHN, Paris)

Scientific classification
- Kingdom: Animalia
- Phylum: Mollusca
- Class: Gastropoda
- Subclass: Caenogastropoda
- Order: Neogastropoda
- Family: Muricidae
- Subfamily: Typhinae
- Genus: Typhinellus
- Species: T. androyensis

Binomial name
- Typhinellus androyensis Bozzetti, 2007

= Typhinellus androyensis =

Species of gastropod

Typhinellus androyensis is a species of sea snail, a marine gastropod mollusk, in the family Muricidae, the murex snails or rock snails.

== Distribution ==
This species occurs in the following locations:

- Gulf of Aden
- Madagascar
