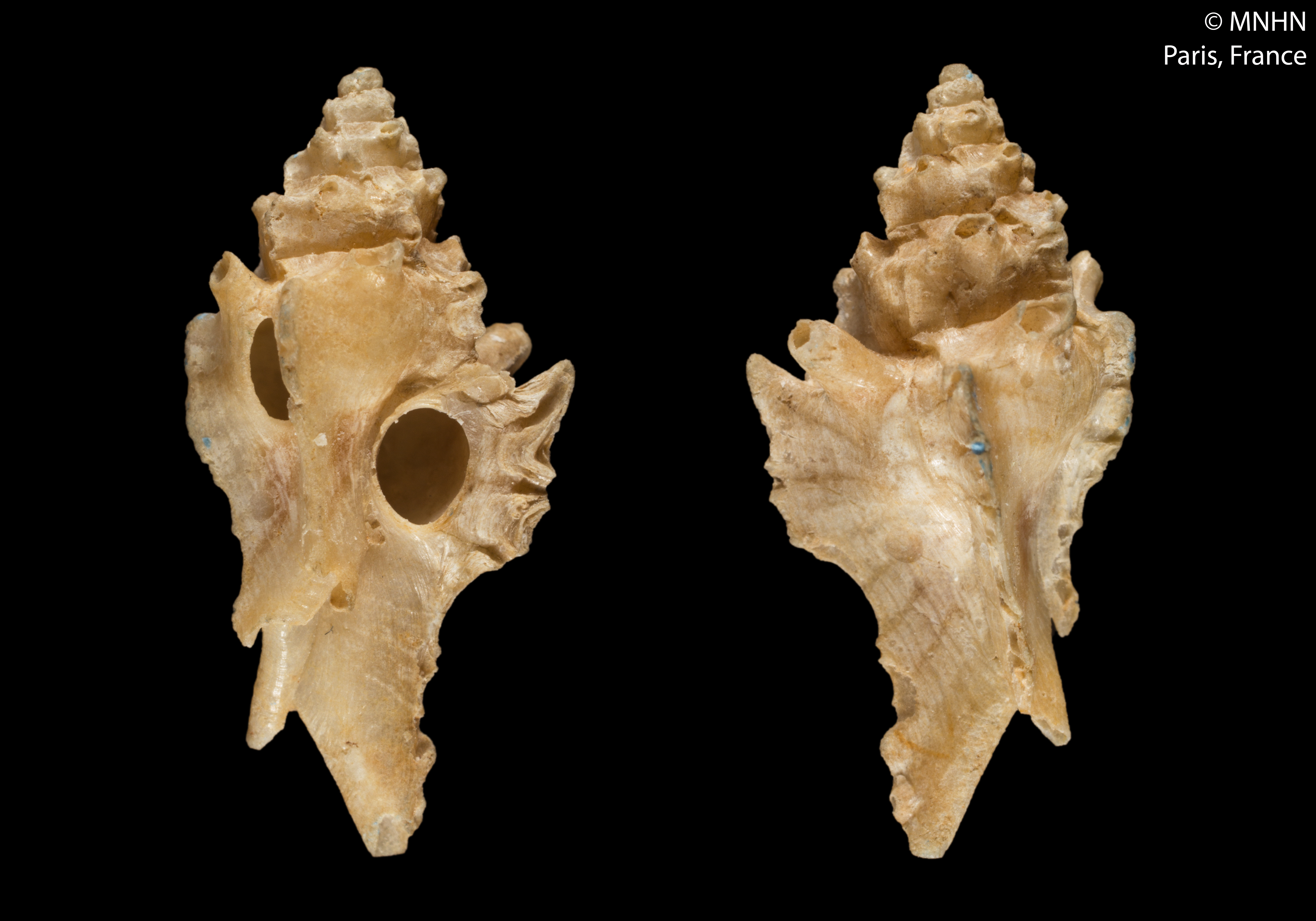
- Shell of Typhinellus insolitus (holotype at MNHN, Paris)

Scientific classification
- Kingdom: Animalia
- Phylum: Mollusca
- Class: Gastropoda
- Subclass: Caenogastropoda
- Order: Neogastropoda
- Family: Muricidae
- Subfamily: Typhinae
- Genus: Typhinellus
- Species: T. insolitus

Binomial name
- Typhinellus insolitus (Houart, 1991)

Synonyms
- Typhis (Typhinellus) insolitus Houart, 1991

= Typhinellus insolitus =

New Caledonian species of sea snails

Typhinellus insolitus is a species of sea snail, a marine gastropod mollusk in the family Muricidae, the murex snails or rock snails. The species is known only from its holotype collected off New Caledonia.

== Description ==
The shell is medium-sized for the subgenus, reaching a length of 16.9 mm at maturity. The spire is high, consisting of five teleoconch whorls; the protoconch is broken in the holotype. Sutures are impressed. Each whorl bears four varices. On the last teleoconch whorl, the varices are sharp.

== Distribution ==
Loyalty Islands, New Caledonia. The holotype was collected dead at a depth of approximately 373 m.

== Ecology ==
No information is available on the ecology or life habits of this species. No additional material has been collected since the original description.

== Etymology ==
The specific name insolitus is derived from Latin, meaning "unusual", referring to the unusual shape of the shell.
