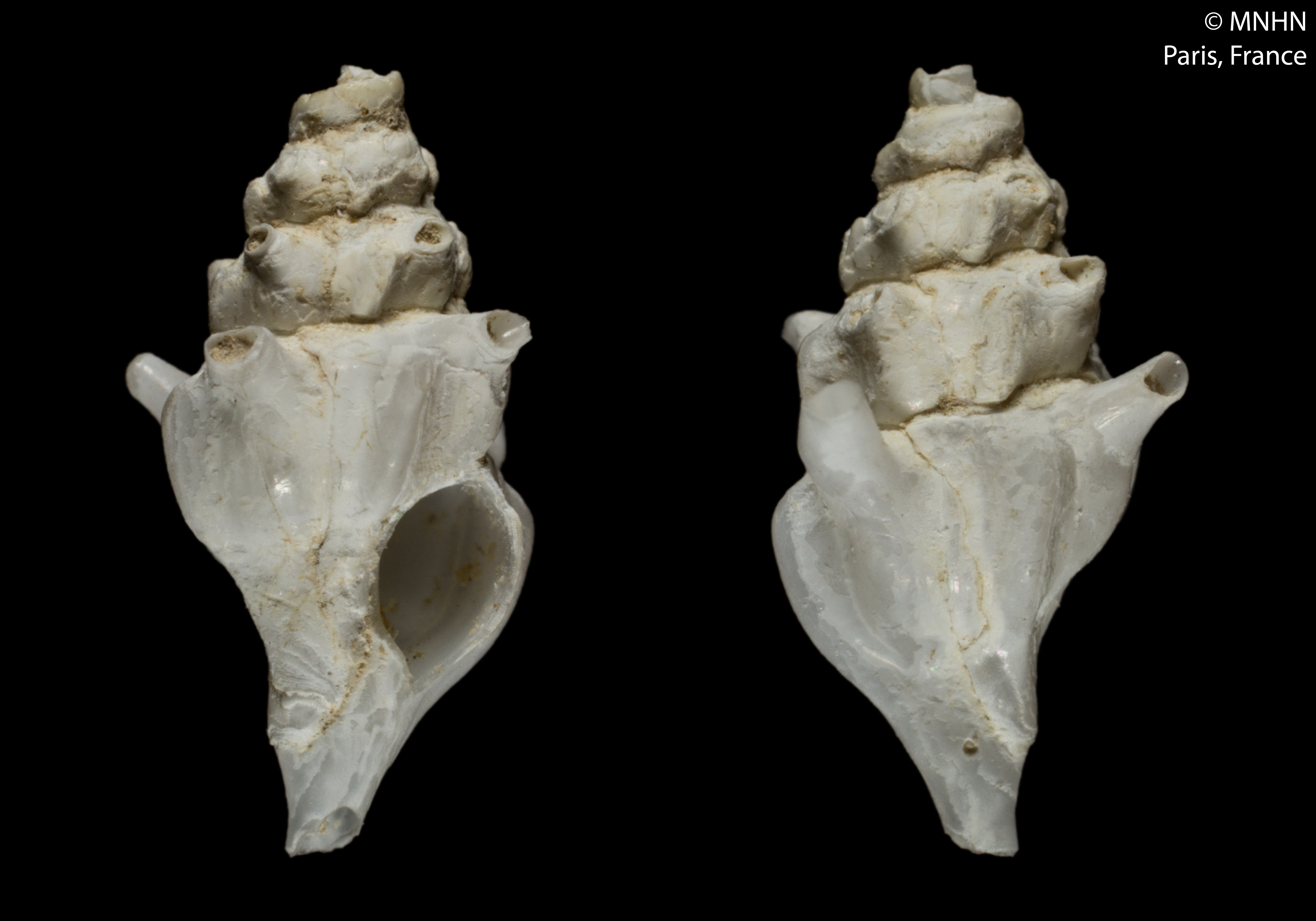
- Shell of Laevityphis libos (holotype at MNHN, Paris)

Scientific classification
- Kingdom: Animalia
- Phylum: Mollusca
- Class: Gastropoda
- Subclass: Caenogastropoda
- Order: Neogastropoda
- Superfamily: Muricoidea
- Family: Muricidae
- Subfamily: Typhinae
- Genus: Laevityphis
- Species: L. libos

Binomial name
- Laevityphis libos Houart, 2017

= Laevityphis libos =

Species of gastropod

Laevityphis libos is a species of sea snail, a marine gastropod mollusk, in the family Muricidae, the murex snails or rock snails.

== Description ==
The length of the shell attains 8.2 mm.

== Distribution ==
This species is found in Papua New Guinea.
