= Typhis chattonensis =

Scientific classification
- Kingdom: Animalia
- Phylum: Mollusca
- Class: Gastropoda
- Subclass: Caenogastropoda
- Order: Neogastropoda
- Superfamily: Muricoidea
- Family: Muricidae
- Subfamily: Typhinae
- Genus: Typhis
- Species: †T. chattonensis

Binomial name
- †Typhis chattonensis Maxwell, 1971

Extinct species of gastropod

Typhis chattonensis is an extinct species of sea snail, a marine gastropod mollusk, in the family Muricidae, the murex snails or rock snails.

== Distribution ==
This species occurs in New Zealand.
