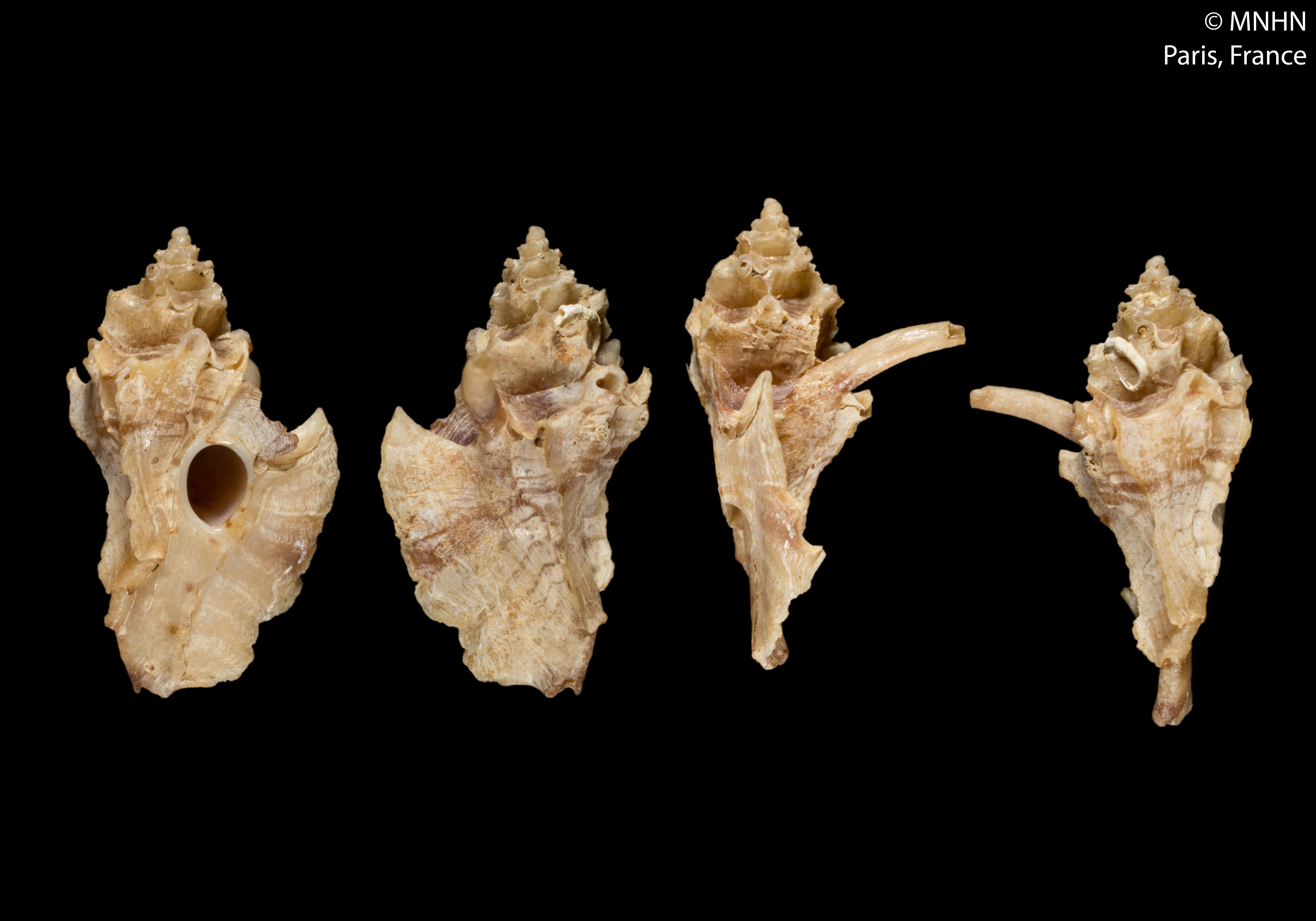
- Shell of Typhinellus laminatus (holotype at MNHN, Paris)

Scientific classification
- Kingdom: Animalia
- Phylum: Mollusca
- Class: Gastropoda
- Subclass: Caenogastropoda
- Order: Neogastropoda
- Family: Muricidae
- Subfamily: Typhinae
- Genus: Typhinellus
- Species: T. laminatus

Binomial name
- Typhinellus laminatus Houart & Héros, 2015

= Typhinellus laminatus =

Species of gastropod

Typhinellus laminatus is a species of sea snail, a marine gastropod mollusk, in the family Muricidae, the murex snails or rock snails.

== Description ==
The length of the shell attains 16.3 mm.

== Distribution ==
This species occurs on Madagascar.
