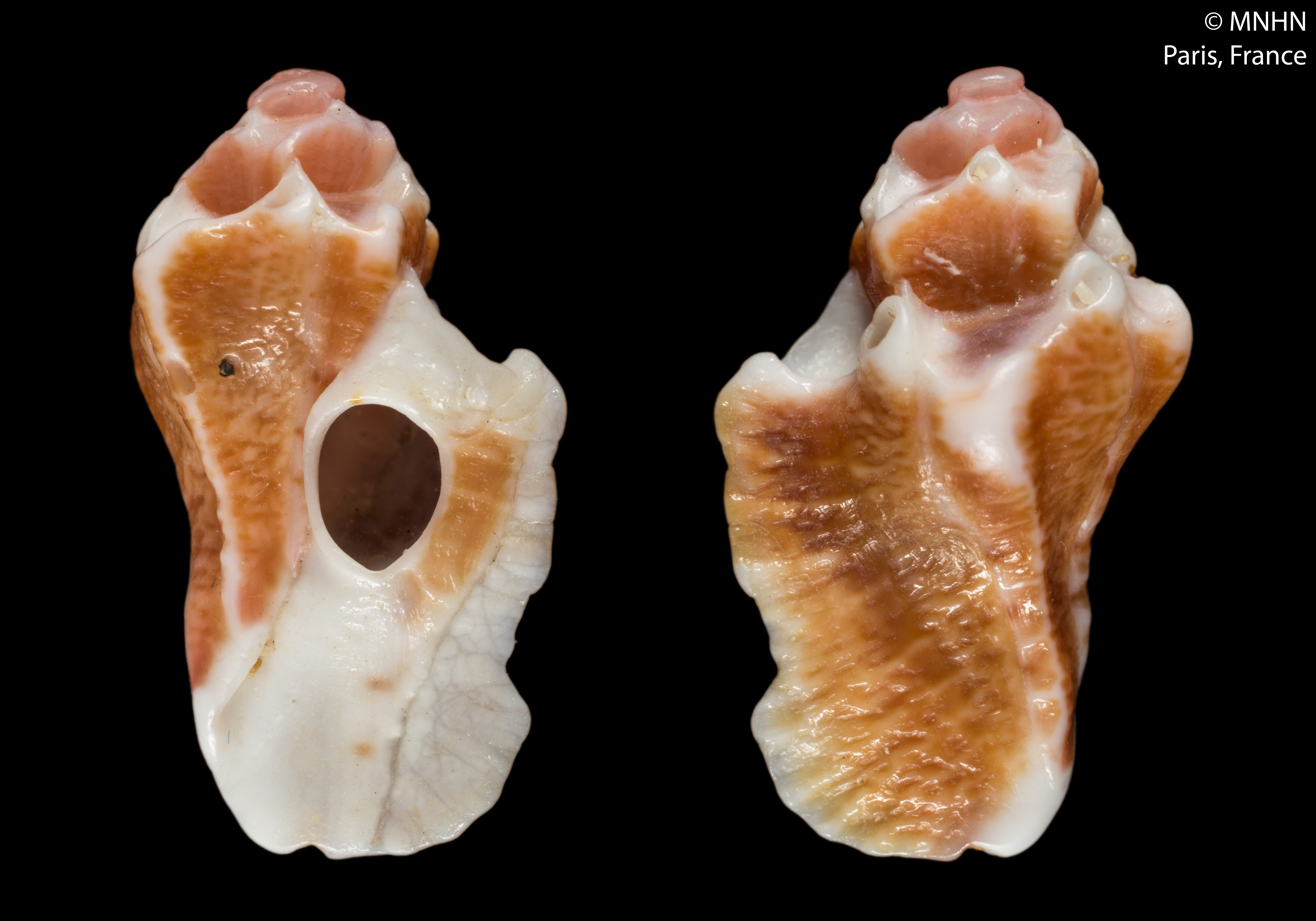
- Typhinellus bicolor

Scientific classification
- Kingdom: Animalia
- Phylum: Mollusca
- Class: Gastropoda
- Subclass: Caenogastropoda
- Order: Neogastropoda
- Superfamily: Muricoidea
- Family: Muricidae
- Subfamily: Typhinae
- Genus: Typhinellus; Jousseaume, 1880

Type species
- Typhis sowerbii Broderip, 1833

Synonyms
- Typhis (Typhinellus) Jousseaume, 1880

= Typhinellus =

Genus of gastropods

Typhinellus is a genus of sea snails, marine gastropod mollusks in the family Muricidae, the murex snails or rock snails.

It was first described by Félix Pierre Jousseaume in 1880.

== Species ==
Species within the genus Typhinellus include:

- Typhinellus amoenus Houart, 1994<
- Typhinellus androyensis Bozzetti, 2007
- Typhinellus bicolor Bozzetti, 2007
- † Typhinellus chipolanus (Gertman, 1969)
- Typhinellus constrictus Houart & Héros, 2015
- Typhinellus insolitus (Houart, 1991)
- Typhinellus jacolombi Houart, 2015
- Typhinellus labiatus (de Cristofori & Jan, 1832)
- Typhinellus laminatus Houart & Héros, 2015
- Typhinellus mirbatensis Houart, Gori & Rosado, 2015
- Typhinellus occlusus (Garrard, 1963)

Species brought into synonymy

- Typhinellus lamyi Garrigues & Merle, 2014: synonym of Typhina lamyi (Garrigues & Merle, 2014) (original combination)
- Typhinellus sowerbyi (Broderip, 1833): synonym of Typhinellus labiatus (de Cristofori & Jan, 1832)
