= Hirtotyphis =

Scientific classification
- Kingdom: Animalia
- Phylum: Mollusca
- Class: Gastropoda
- Subclass: Caenogastropoda
- Order: Neogastropoda
- Superfamily: Muricoidea
- Family: Muricidae
- Subfamily: Typhinae
- Genus: Hirtotyphis; Jousseaume, 1880

Type species
- † Murex horridus Brocchi, 1814

Synonyms
- Typhis (Hirtotyphis) Jousseaume, 1880 ·

Genus of gastropods

Hirtotyphis is a genus of sea snails, marine gastropod mollusks in the family Muricidae, the murex snails or rock snails.

== Species ==
- † Hirtotyphis aoteanus (Vella, 1961)
- † Hirtotyphis horridus (Brocchi, 1814)
- † Hirtotyphis panoplus (P. A. Maxwell, 1971)
- Hirtotyphis trispinosus Houart, 1991
