= Choreotyphis erythrostigma =

Scientific classification
- Kingdom: Animalia
- Phylum: Mollusca
- Class: Gastropoda
- Subclass: Caenogastropoda
- Order: Neogastropoda
- Family: Muricidae
- Genus: Choreotyphis
- Species: C. erythrostigma

Binomial name
- Choreotyphis erythrostigma (Keen & Campbell, 1964)

Synonyms
- Siphonochelus (Siphonochelus) erythrostigma Keen & G. B. Campbell, 1964 (basionym); Siphonochelus (Trubatsa) erythrostigma Keen & G. B. Campbell, 1964· accepted, alternate representation; Siphonochelus erythrostigma Keen & G. B. Campbell, 1964 (original combination)

Species of gastropod

Choreotyphis erythrostigma is a species of sea snail, a marine gastropod mollusk in the family Muricidae, the murex snails or rock snails.

== Distribution ==
This marine species occurs in Moreton Bay.
