= Laevityphis bullisi =

Scientific classification
- Kingdom: Animalia
- Phylum: Mollusca
- Class: Gastropoda
- Subclass: Caenogastropoda
- Order: Neogastropoda
- Family: Muricidae
- Genus: Laevityphis
- Species: L. bullisi

Binomial name
- Laevityphis bullisi Gertman, 1969

Synonyms
- Siphonochelus (Laevityphis) bullisi Gertman, 1969

Species of gastropod

Laevityphis bullisi is a species of sea snail, a marine gastropod mollusk in the family Muricidae, the murex snails or rock snails.
