= Typhinellus occlusus =

Scientific classification
- Kingdom: Animalia
- Phylum: Mollusca
- Class: Gastropoda
- Subclass: Caenogastropoda
- Order: Neogastropoda
- Family: Muricidae
- Genus: Typhinellus
- Species: T. occlusus

Binomial name
- Typhinellus occlusus (Garrard, 1963)

Synonyms
- Typhisopsis occlusus Garrard, 1963

Species of gastropod

Typhinellus occlusus is a species of sea snail, a marine gastropod mollusk in the family Muricidae, the murex snails or rock snails.
