= Typhina grandis =

Scientific classification
- Kingdom: Animalia
- Phylum: Mollusca
- Class: Gastropoda
- Subclass: Caenogastropoda
- Order: Neogastropoda
- Family: Muricidae
- Genus: Typhina
- Species: T. grandis

Binomial name
- Typhina grandis (A. Adams, 1855)

Synonyms
- Typhis grandis A. Adams, 1855 (original combination); Typhisala grandis (A. Adams, 1855)

Species of gastropod

Typhina grandis is a species of sea snail, a marine gastropod mollusk in the family Muricidae, the murex snails or rock snails.
