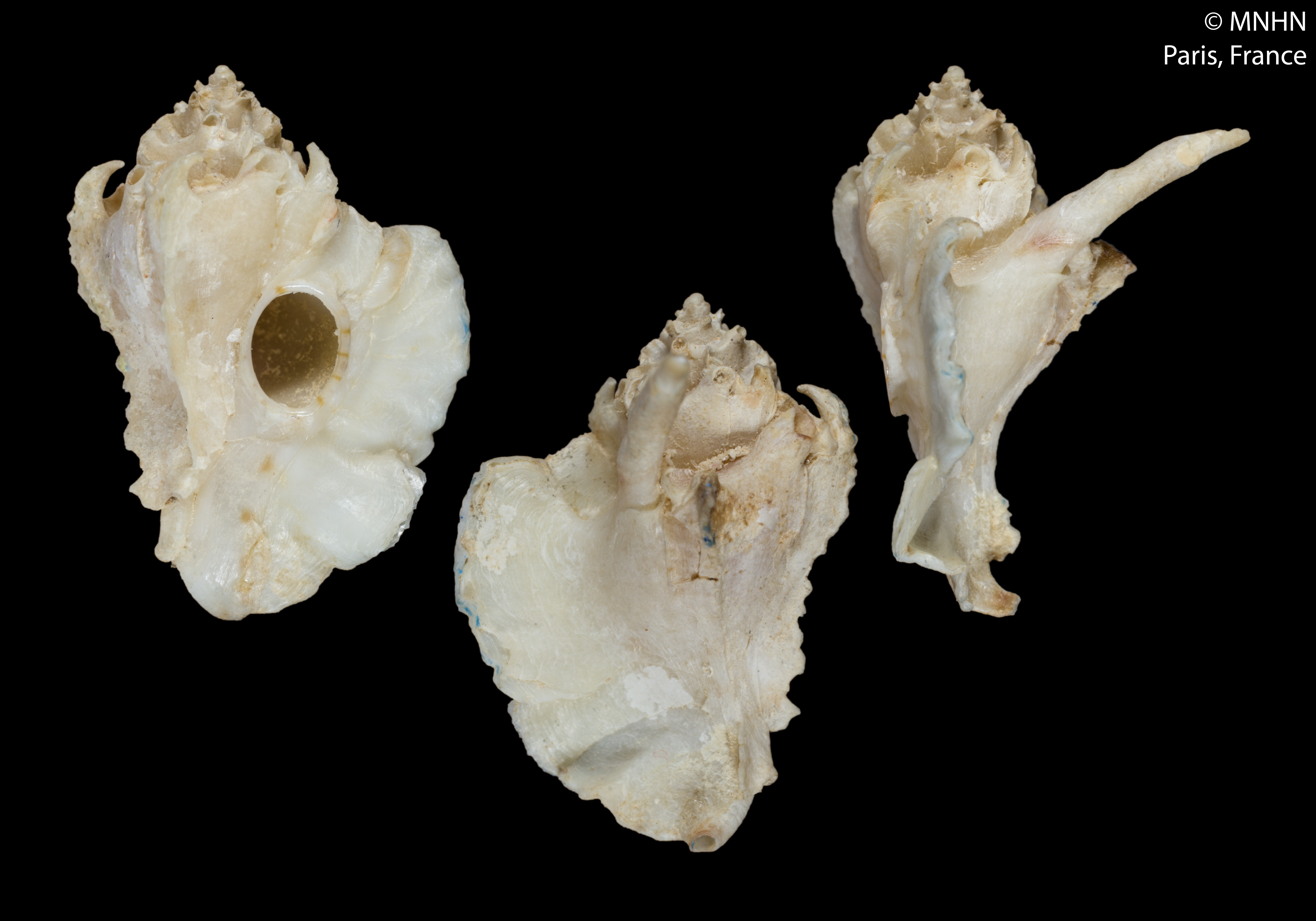
- Shell of Typhina neocaledonica (holotype at MNHN, Paris)

Scientific classification
- Kingdom: Animalia
- Phylum: Mollusca
- Class: Gastropoda
- Subclass: Caenogastropoda
- Order: Neogastropoda
- Family: Muricidae
- Genus: Typhina
- Species: T. neocaledonica

Binomial name
- Typhina neocaledonica (Houart, 1987)

Synonyms
- Typhis (Talityphis) neocaledonicus Houart, 1987; Typhisala neocaledonicus (Houart, 1987)

= Typhina neocaledonica =

Species of gastropod

Typhina neocaledonica is a species of sea snail, a marine gastropod mollusk in the family Muricidae, the murex snails or rock snails.

== Description ==
The length of the shell attains 33 mm (1.3 in).

== Distribution ==
This marine species occurs off New Caledonia.
