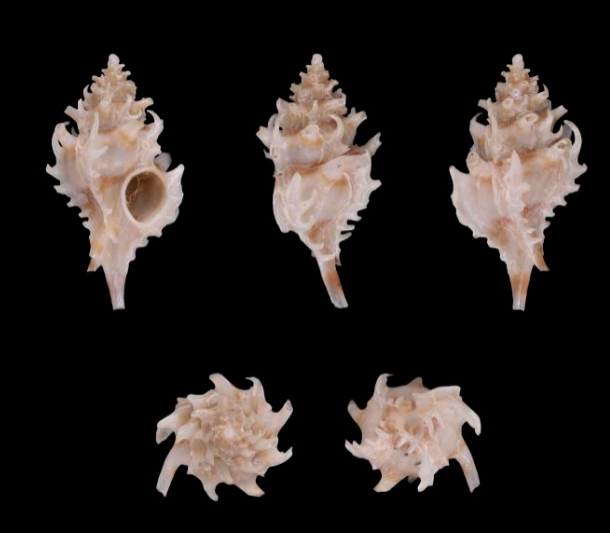
- Shell of Typhis phillipensis (specimen at the Smithsonian Institution)

Scientific classification
- Kingdom: Animalia
- Phylum: Mollusca
- Class: Gastropoda
- Subclass: Caenogastropoda
- Order: Neogastropoda
- Family: Muricidae
- Genus: Typhis
- Species: T. phillipensis

Binomial name
- Typhis phillipensis Watson, 1883

Synonyms
- Typhis (Typhis) phillipensis R. B. Watson, 1883 · alternate representation; Typhis interpres Iredale, 1924; Typhis phillipensis Watson, 1883; Typhis philippinensis [sic] · (misspelling); Typhis phillipensis interpres Iredale, 1924

= Typhis phillipensis =

Species of gastropod

Typhis phillipensis is a species of sea snail, a marine gastropod mollusk in the family Muricidae, the murex snails or rock snails.

Typhis phillipensis usually have a white or fawn color, and has angled whorls. They have a spiral structure that generally contains about five ribs.

== Description ==
The length of the shell attains 15.5 mm (0.61 in).

== Distribution ==
This marine species occurs off Australia.
