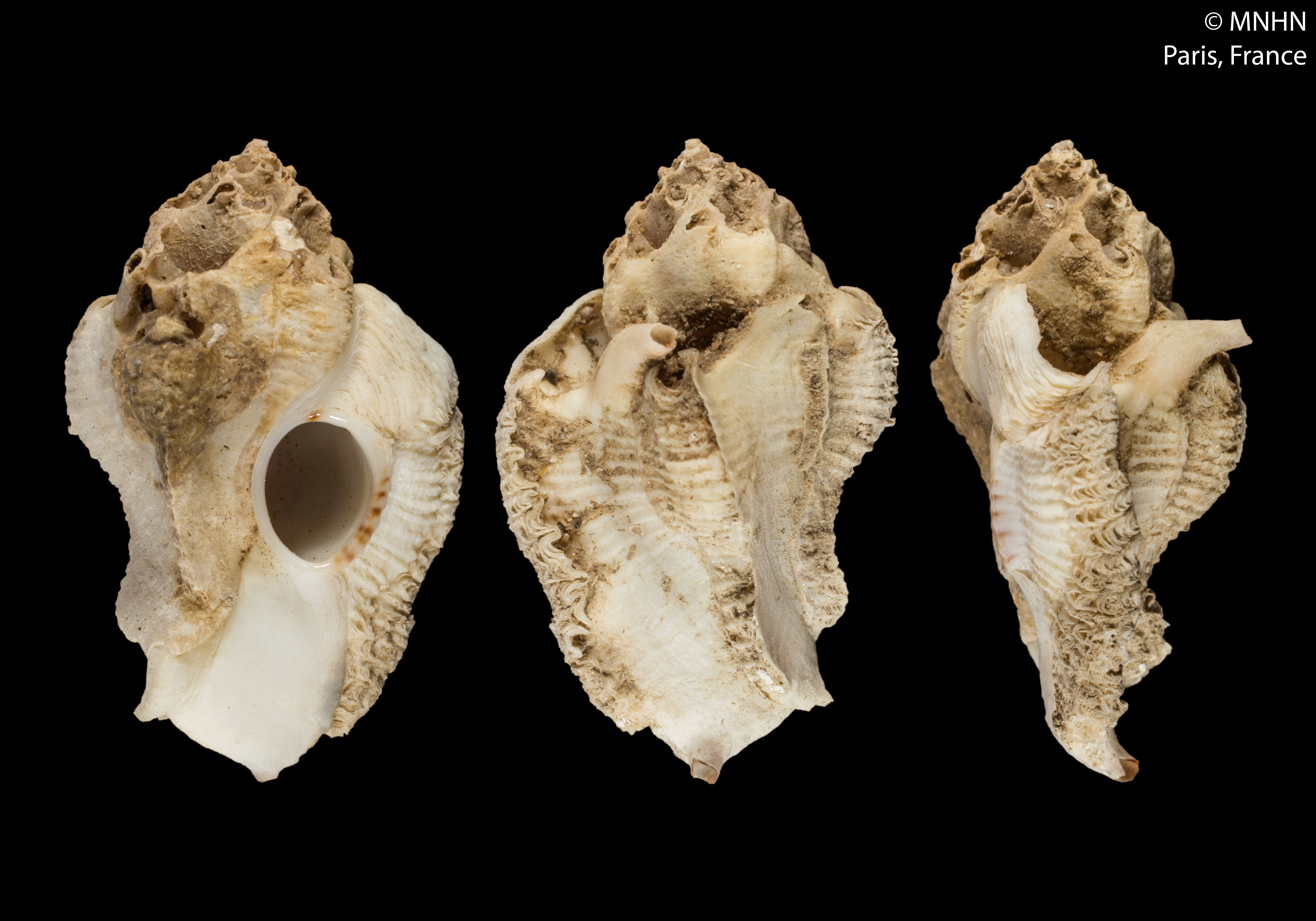
- Shell of Typhina coronata (lectotype at MNHN, Paris)

Scientific classification
- Kingdom: Animalia
- Phylum: Mollusca
- Class: Gastropoda
- Subclass: Caenogastropoda
- Order: Neogastropoda
- Family: Muricidae
- Genus: Typhina
- Species: T. coronata

Binomial name
- Typhina coronata (Broderip, 1833)

Synonyms
- Murex siphoniferus Lesson, 1844; Typhis coronatus Broderip, 1833; Typhis martyria Dall, 1902; Typhis quadratus Hinds, 1843; Typhisopsis coronatus (Broderip, 1833)

= Typhina coronata =

Species of gastropod

Typhina coronata is a species of sea snail, a marine gastropod mollusk in the family Muricidae, the murex snails or rock snails.

== Description ==
The length of the shell attains about 21 mm (0.83 in).

== Distribution ==
This marine species was found off Acapulco, Mexico; also off Panama, Peru, Ecuador and the Galapagos Islands.
