= Choreotyphis =

Scientific classification
- Kingdom: Animalia
- Phylum: Mollusca
- Class: Gastropoda
- Subclass: Caenogastropoda
- Order: Neogastropoda
- Superfamily: Muricoidea
- Family: Muricidae
- Subfamily: Typhinae
- Genus: Choreotyphis; Iredale, 1936

Type species
- Typhina pavlova Iredale, 1936

Synonyms
- Typhina (Choreotyphis) Iredale, 1936

Genus of gastropods

Choreotyphis is a genus of sea snails, marine gastropod mollusks in the family Muricidae, the murex snails or rock snails.

== Species ==
Species within the genus Choreotyphis include:

- Choreotyphis erythrostigma (Keen & Campbell, 1964)
- Choreotyphis pavlova (Iredale, 1936)
