= Indotyphis =

Scientific classification
- Kingdom: Animalia
- Phylum: Mollusca
- Class: Gastropoda
- Subclass: Caenogastropoda
- Order: Neogastropoda
- Superfamily: Muricoidea
- Family: Muricidae
- Subfamily: Typhinae
- Genus: †Indotyphis; Keen, 1944

Extinct genus of gastropods

Indotyphis is an extinct genus of sea snails, marine gastropod mollusks, in the family Muricidae, the murex snails or rock snails.

It is considered a synonym of † Laevityphis (Indotyphis) Keen, 1944. Its status is uncertain, as it has not been researched in recent literature.
