= Typhina belcheri =

- Shell of Typhina belcheri (holotype at MNHN, Paris)

Scientific classification
- Kingdom: Animalia
- Phylum: Mollusca
- Class: Gastropoda
- Subclass: Caenogastropoda
- Order: Neogastropoda
- Family: Muricidae
- Genus: Typhina
- Species: T. belcheri

Binomial name
- Typhina belcheri (Broderip, 1833)

Synonyms
- Murex (Typhis) cleryi Petit, 1840; Typhis belcheri Broderip, 1833; Typhis cleryi (Petit de la Saussaye, 1840); Typhis melloleitaoi Morretes, 1940

Species of gastropod

Typhina belcheri is a species of sea snail, a marine gastropod mollusk in the family Muricidae, the murex snails or rock snails.

== Description ==
The length of the shell attains 18 mm.

== Distribution ==
This species occurs in the Atlantic Ocean off Brazil, Mauritania, and the Western Sahara.
