= Distichotyphis =

Scientific classification
- Kingdom: Animalia
- Phylum: Mollusca
- Class: Gastropoda
- Subclass: Caenogastropoda
- Order: Neogastropoda
- Family: Muricidae
- Subfamily: Typhinae
- Genus: Distichotyphis; Keen & Campbell, 1964

Genus of gastropods

Distichotyphis is a genus of sea snails, marine gastropod mollusks in the family Muricidae, the murex snails or rock snails.

== Species ==
Species within the genus Distichotyphis include:

- Distichotyphis vemae Keen & Campbell, 1964
