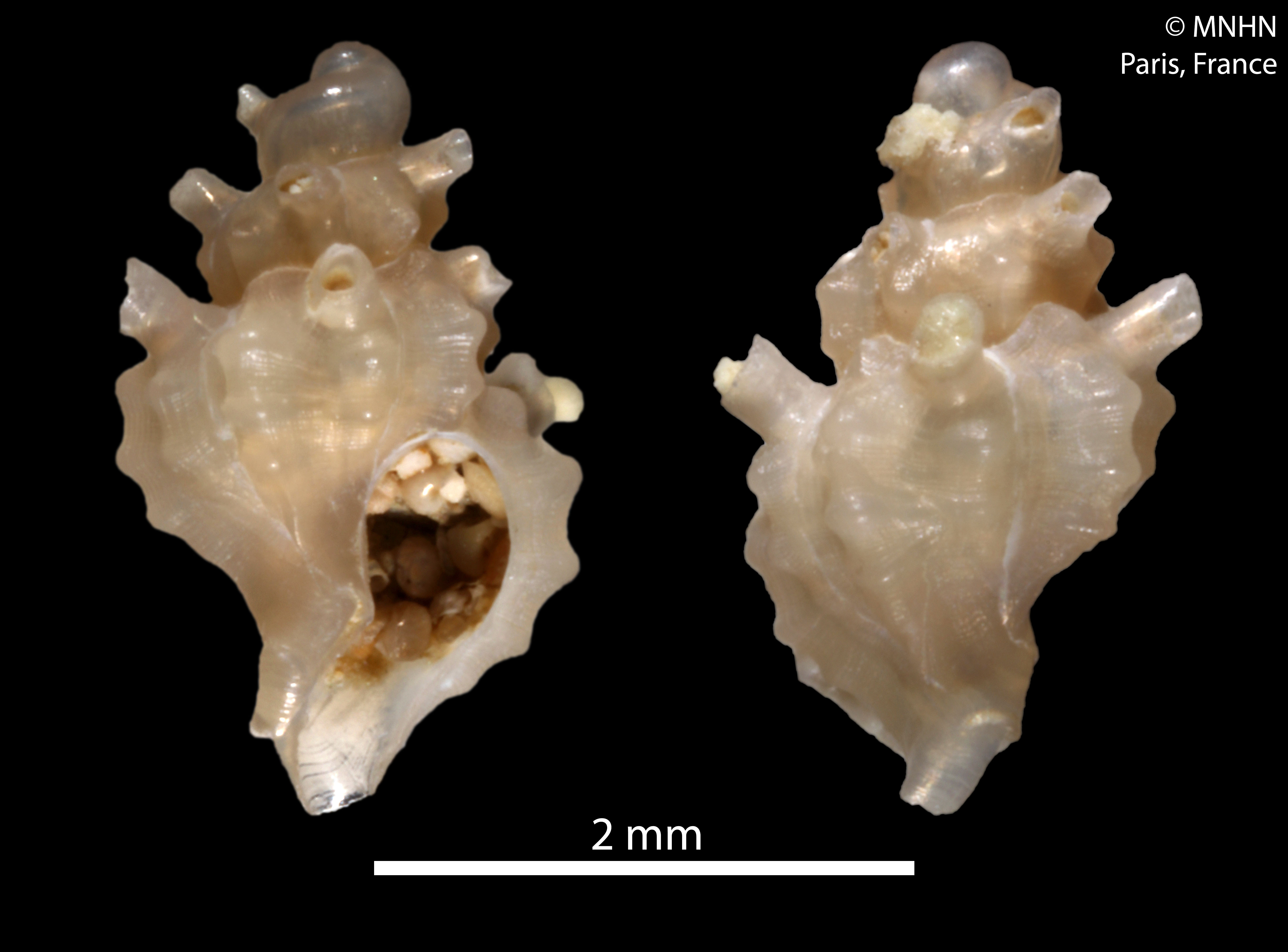
- Shell of Brasithyphis barrosi (paratype at MNHN, Paris)

Scientific classification
- Kingdom: Animalia
- Phylum: Mollusca
- Class: Gastropoda
- Subclass: Caenogastropoda
- Order: Neogastropoda
- Family: Muricidae
- Genus: Brasityphis
- Species: B. barrosi

Binomial name
- Brasityphis barrosi Absalão & Santos, 2003

= Brasityphis barrosi =

Species of gastropod

Brasityphis barrosi is a species of sea snail, a marine gastropod mollusk in the family Muricidae, the murex snails or rock snails.

== Distribution ==
This marine species occurs off Northeastern Brazil.
