= Typhina puertoricensis =

Scientific classification
- Kingdom: Animalia
- Phylum: Mollusca
- Class: Gastropoda
- Subclass: Caenogastropoda
- Order: Neogastropoda
- Family: Muricidae
- Genus: Typhina
- Species: T. puertoricensis

Binomial name
- Typhina puertoricensis (Warmke, 1964)

Synonyms
- Typhis (Talityphis) puertoricensis Warmke, 1964

Species of gastropod

Typhina puertoricensis is a species of sea snail, a marine gastropod mollusk in the family Muricidae, the murex snails or rock snails. It is endemic to Puerto Rico.
