= Typhis cuniculosus =

Scientific classification
- Kingdom: Animalia
- Phylum: Mollusca
- Class: Gastropoda
- Subclass: Caenogastropoda
- Order: Neogastropoda
- Family: Muricidae
- Genus: Typhis
- Species: T. cuniculosus

Binomial name
- Typhis cuniculosus Duchâtel in Bronn, 1848

Species of gastropod

Typhis cuniculosus is a species of sea snail, a marine gastropod mollusk in the family Muricidae, the murex snails or rock snails.
