= Typhina campbelli =

Scientific classification
- Kingdom: Animalia
- Phylum: Mollusca
- Class: Gastropoda
- Subclass: Caenogastropoda
- Order: Neogastropoda
- Family: Muricidae
- Genus: Typhina
- Species: T. campbelli

Binomial name
- Typhina campbelli (Radwin & D'Attilio, 1976)

Synonyms
- Talityphis campbelli Radwin & D'Attilio, 1976

Species of gastropod

Typhina campbelli is a species of sea snail, a marine gastropod mollusk in the family Muricidae, the murex snails or rock snails.
