= Laevityphis tubuliger =

Scientific classification
- Kingdom: Animalia
- Phylum: Mollusca
- Class: Gastropoda
- Subclass: Caenogastropoda
- Order: Neogastropoda
- Family: Muricidae
- Genus: Laevityphis
- Species: L. tubuliger

Binomial name
- Laevityphis tubuliger (Thiele, 1925)

Synonyms
- Typhis tubuliger Thiele, 1925

Species of gastropod

Laevityphis tubuliger is a species of sea snail, a marine gastropod mollusk in the family Muricidae, the murex snails or rock snails.
