= Typhina expansa =

Scientific classification
- Kingdom: Animalia
- Phylum: Mollusca
- Class: Gastropoda
- Subclass: Caenogastropoda
- Order: Neogastropoda
- Family: Muricidae
- Genus: Typhina
- Species: T. expansa

Binomial name
- Typhina expansa (Sowerby, 1874)

Synonyms
- Talityphis perchardei Radwin & D'Attilio, 1976; Typhis expansus Sowerby, 1874

Species of gastropod

Typhina expansa is a species of sea snail, a marine gastropod mollusk in the family Muricidae, the murex snails or rock snails.
