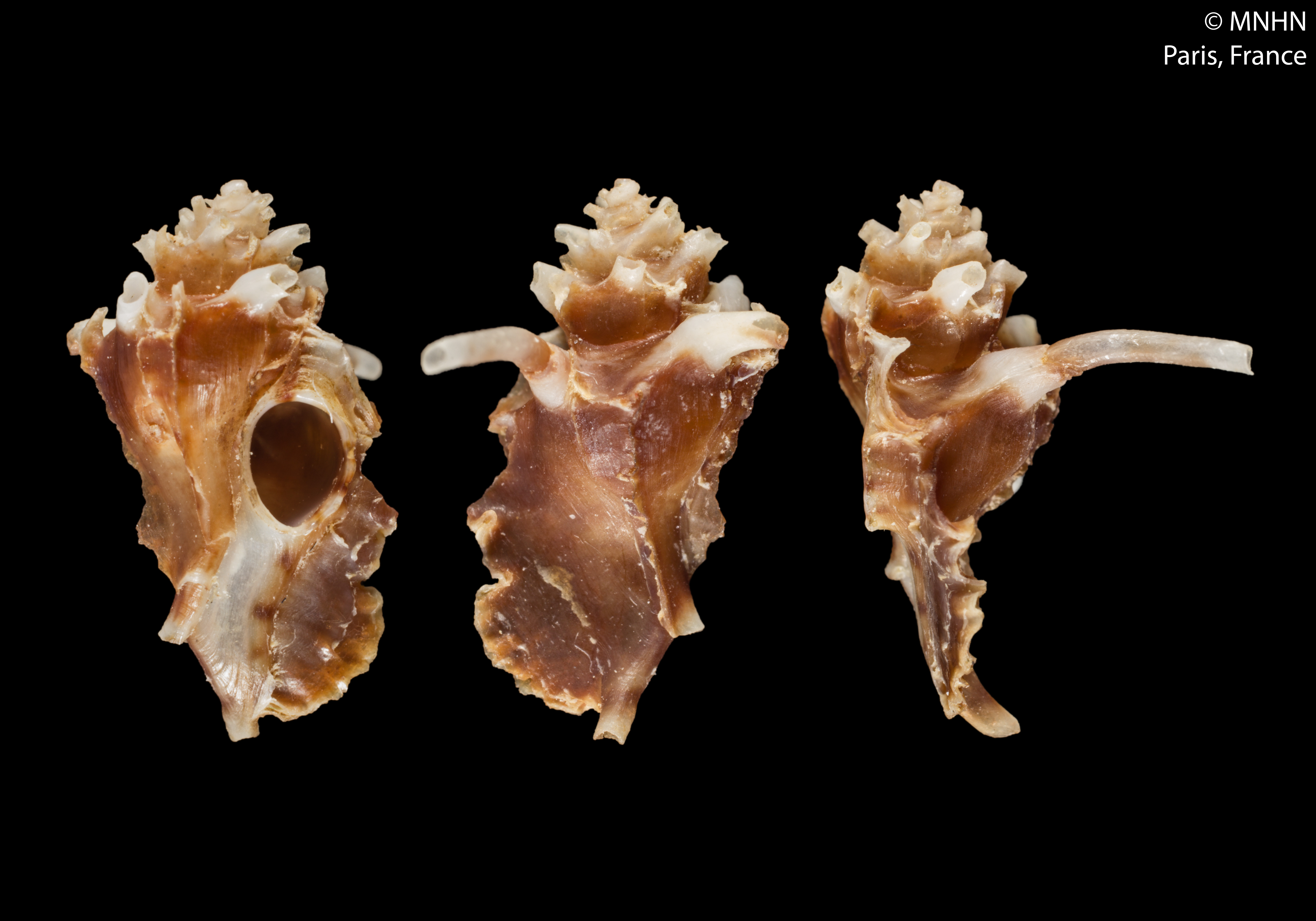
- Shell of Typhina lamyi (MNHN-IM-2013-7776)(holotype at MNHN, Paris)

Scientific classification
- Kingdom: Animalia
- Phylum: Mollusca
- Class: Gastropoda
- Subclass: Caenogastropoda
- Order: Neogastropoda
- Family: Muricidae
- Subfamily: Typhinae
- Genus: Typhina
- Species: T. lamyi

Binomial name
- Typhina lamyi (Garrigues & Merle, 2014)

Synonyms
- Typhinellus lamyi Garrigues & Merle, 2014 (original combination)

= Typhina lamyi =

Species of gastropod

Typhina lamyi is a species of sea snail, a marine gastropod mollusk, in the family Muricidae, the murex snails or rock snails.

== Distribution ==
This species occurs in Guadeloupe.
