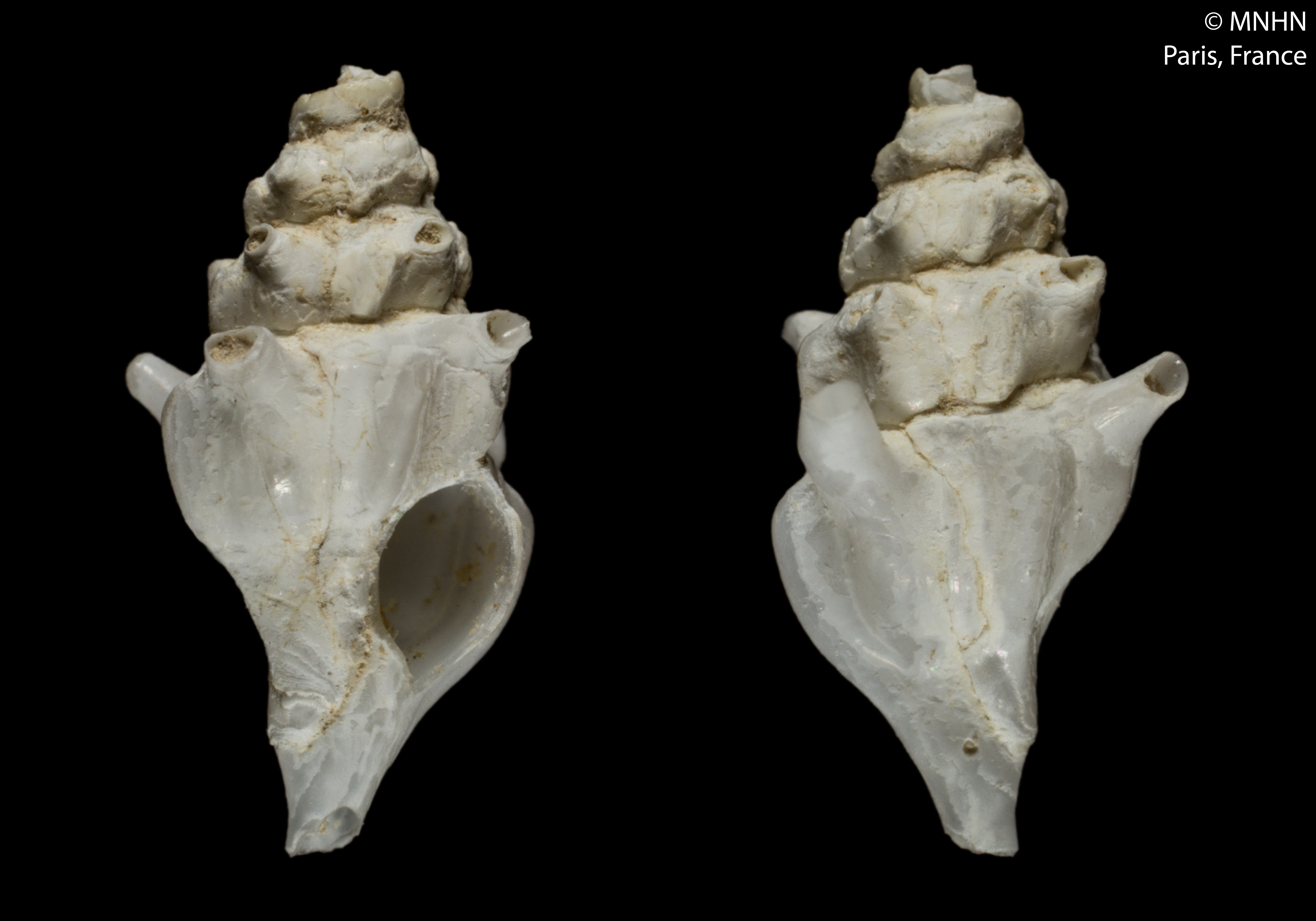
- Laevityphis libos

Scientific classification
- Kingdom: Animalia
- Phylum: Mollusca
- Class: Gastropoda
- Subclass: Caenogastropoda
- Order: Neogastropoda
- Superfamily: Muricoidea
- Family: Muricidae
- Subfamily: Typhinae
- Genus: Laevityphis; Cossmann, 1903

Type species
- † Typhis coronarius Deshayes, 1865

Synonyms
- Laevityphis (Laevityphis) Cossmann, 1903; Siphonochelus (Laevityphis) Cossmann, 1903; Typhis (Laevityphis) Cossmann, 1903 (original rank)

= Laevityphis =

Genus of gastropods

Laevityphis is a genus of sea snails, marine gastropod mollusks in the family Muricidae, the murex snails or rock snails.

== Species ==
The genus Laevityphis contains four species: Species within the genus Laevityphis include:

- Laevityphis bullisi Gertman, 1969
- † Laevityphis costaricensis (Olsson, 1922)
- † Laevityphis gracilis (Conrad, 1833) †
- † Laevityphis jungi Landau & Houart, 2014 †
- Laevityphis libos Houart, 2017
- † Laevityphis linguiferus (Dall, 1890) †
- † Laevityphis ludbrookae Keen & G. B. Campbell, 1964 †
- † Laevityphis muticus (J. de C. Sowerby, 1835) †
- † Laevityphis schencki Keen & G. B. Campbell, 1964 †
- †Laevityphis tepungai (C. A. Fleming, 1943)
- Laevityphis tillierae' (Houart, 1985)
- Laevityphis tubuliger (Thiele, 1925)

Species brought into synonymy

- Laevityphis transcurrens Martens, 1902: synonym of Siphonochelus transcurrens (Martens, 1902)
