= Haustellotyphis cumingii =

Scientific classification
- Kingdom: Animalia
- Phylum: Mollusca
- Class: Gastropoda
- Subclass: Caenogastropoda
- Order: Neogastropoda
- Family: Muricidae
- Genus: Haustellotyphis
- Species: H. cumingii

Binomial name
- Haustellotyphis cumingii (Broderip, 1833)

Synonyms
- Typhis cumingii Broderip, 1833

Species of gastropod

Haustellotyphis cumingii is a species of sea snail, a marine gastropod mollusk in the family Muricidae, the murex snails or rock snails.
