= Distichotyphis vemae =

Scientific classification
- Kingdom: Animalia
- Phylum: Mollusca
- Class: Gastropoda
- Subclass: Caenogastropoda
- Order: Neogastropoda
- Family: Muricidae
- Genus: Distichotyphis
- Species: D. vemae

Binomial name
- Distichotyphis vemae Keen & Campbell, 1964

Species of gastropod

Distichotyphis vemae is a species of sea snail, a marine gastropod mollusk in the family Muricidae, the murex snails or rock snails.
