= Typhina clarki =

Scientific classification
- Kingdom: Animalia
- Phylum: Mollusca
- Class: Gastropoda
- Subclass: Caenogastropoda
- Order: Neogastropoda
- Family: Muricidae
- Genus: Typhina
- Species: T. clarki

Binomial name
- Typhina clarki (Keen & Campbell, 1964)

Synonyms
- Typhis (Typhisopsis) clarki Keen & Campbell, 1964; Typhisala clarki (Keen & G. B. Campbell, 1964)

Species of gastropod

Typhina clarki is a species of sea snail, a marine gastropod mollusk in the family Muricidae, the murex snails or rock snails.

== Distribution ==
This marine species occurs in Panama Bay.
