= Haustellotyphis wendita =

Scientific classification
- Kingdom: Animalia
- Phylum: Mollusca
- Class: Gastropoda
- Subclass: Caenogastropoda
- Order: Neogastropoda
- Family: Muricidae
- Genus: Haustellotyphis
- Species: H. wendita

Binomial name
- Haustellotyphis wendita Hertz, 1995

Species of gastropod

Haustellotyphis wendita is a species of sea snail, a marine gastropod mollusk in the family Muricidae, the murex snails or rock snails.
