= Typhis westaustralis =

Scientific classification
- Kingdom: Animalia
- Phylum: Mollusca
- Class: Gastropoda
- Subclass: Caenogastropoda
- Order: Neogastropoda
- Family: Muricidae
- Genus: Typhis
- Species: T. westaustralis

Binomial name
- Typhis westaustralis Houart, 1991

Synonyms
- Typhis westaustralis Houart, 1991

Species of gastropod

Typhis westaustralis is a species of sea snail, a marine gastropod mollusk in the family Muricidae, the murex snails or rock snails.
