= Typhis gabbi =

Scientific classification
- Kingdom: Animalia
- Phylum: Mollusca
- Class: Gastropoda
- Subclass: Caenogastropoda
- Order: Neogastropoda
- Family: Muricidae
- Genus: Typhis
- Species: T. gabbi

Binomial name
- Typhis gabbi Brown & Pilsbry, 1911

Species of gastropod

Typhis gabbi is a species of sea snail, a marine gastropod mollusk in the family Muricidae, the murex snails or rock snails.
