= Haustellotyphis =

Scientific classification
- Kingdom: Animalia
- Phylum: Mollusca
- Class: Gastropoda
- Subclass: Caenogastropoda
- Order: Neogastropoda
- Family: Muricidae
- Subfamily: Typhinae
- Genus: Haustellotyphis; Jousseaume, 1880

Genus of gastropods

Haustellotyphis is a genus of sea snails, marine gastropod mollusks in the family Muricidae, the murex snails or rock snails. It was described by Félix Pierre Jousseaume in 1880.

== Species ==
Species within the genus Haustellotyphis include:

- Haustellotyphis cumingii (Broderip, 1833)
- Haustellotyphis wendita Hertz, 1995
