= Brasityphis =

Scientific classification
- Kingdom: Animalia
- Phylum: Mollusca
- Class: Gastropoda
- Subclass: Caenogastropoda
- Order: Neogastropoda
- Superfamily: Muricoidea
- Family: Muricidae
- Subfamily: Typhinae
- Genus: Brasityphis; Absalão & Santos, 2003

Type species
- Brasityphis barrosi Absalão & Santos, 2003

Genus of gastropods

Brasityphis is a genus of sea snails, marine gastropod mollusks in the family Muricidae, the murex snails or rock snails.

== Species ==
Species within the genus Brasityphis include:

- Brasityphis barrosi Absalão & Santos, 2003
