= Laevityphis muticus =

Scientific classification
- Kingdom: Animalia
- Phylum: Mollusca
- Class: Gastropoda
- Subclass: Caenogastropoda
- Order: Neogastropoda
- Superfamily: Muricoidea
- Family: Muricidae
- Subfamily: Typhinae
- Genus: Laevityphis
- Species: †L. muticus

Binomial name
- †Laevityphis muticus (J. de C. Sowerby, 1835)

Synonyms
- † Siphonochelus (Laevityphis) muticus (J. de C. Sowerby, 1835) superseded combination; † Typhis coronarius Deshayes, 1865; † Typhis muticus J. de C. Sowerby, 1834

Extinct species of gastropod

Laevityphis muticus is an extinct species of sea snail, a marine gastropod mollusk, in the family Muricidae, the murex snails or rock snails.
