= Rugotyphis francescae =

Scientific classification
- Kingdom: Animalia
- Phylum: Mollusca
- Class: Gastropoda
- Subclass: Caenogastropoda
- Order: Neogastropoda
- Superfamily: Muricoidea
- Family: Muricidae
- Subfamily: Typhinae
- Genus: †Rugotyphis
- Species: †R. francescae

Binomial name
- †Rugotyphis francescae (Finlay, 1924)

Synonyms
- † Typhis francescae Finlay, 1924

Extinct species of gastropod

Rugotyphis francescae is an extinct species of sea snail, a marine gastropod mollusk, in the family Muricidae, the murex snails or rock snails.

== Distribution ==
This species occurs in New Zealand.
