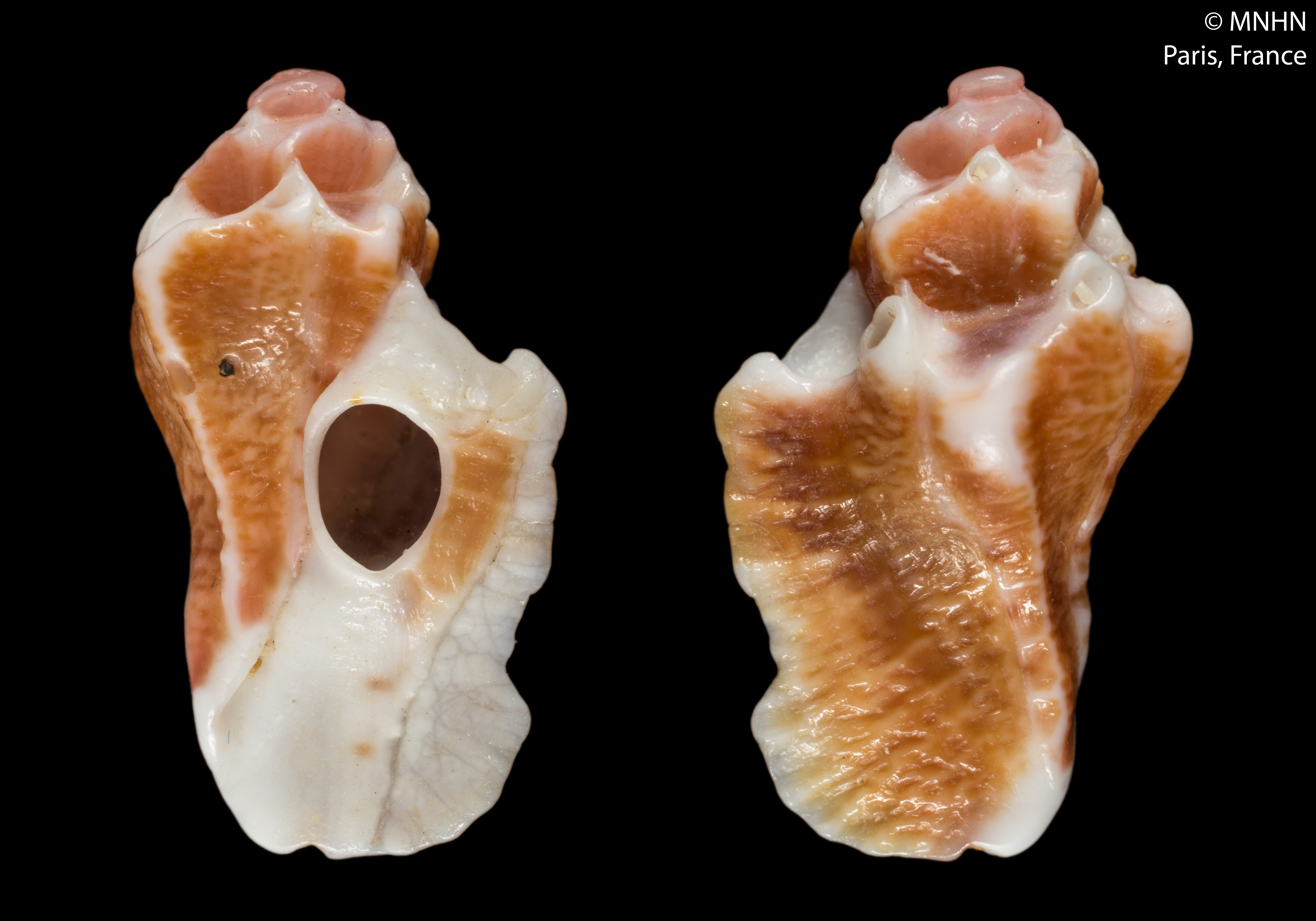

Scientific classification
- Kingdom: Animalia
- Phylum: Mollusca
- Class: Gastropoda
- Subclass: Caenogastropoda
- Order: Neogastropoda
- Family: Muricidae
- Genus: Typhinellus
- Species: T. bicolor

Binomial name
- Typhinellus bicolor Bozzetti, 2007

= Typhinellus bicolor =

Species of gastropod

Typhinellus bicolor is a species of sea snail, a marine gastropod mollusk in the family Muricidae, the murex snails or rock snails.

== Description ==
The length of the shell attains 21 mm.

== Distribution ==
This marine species occurs off Madagascar, Morocco and Turkey.
