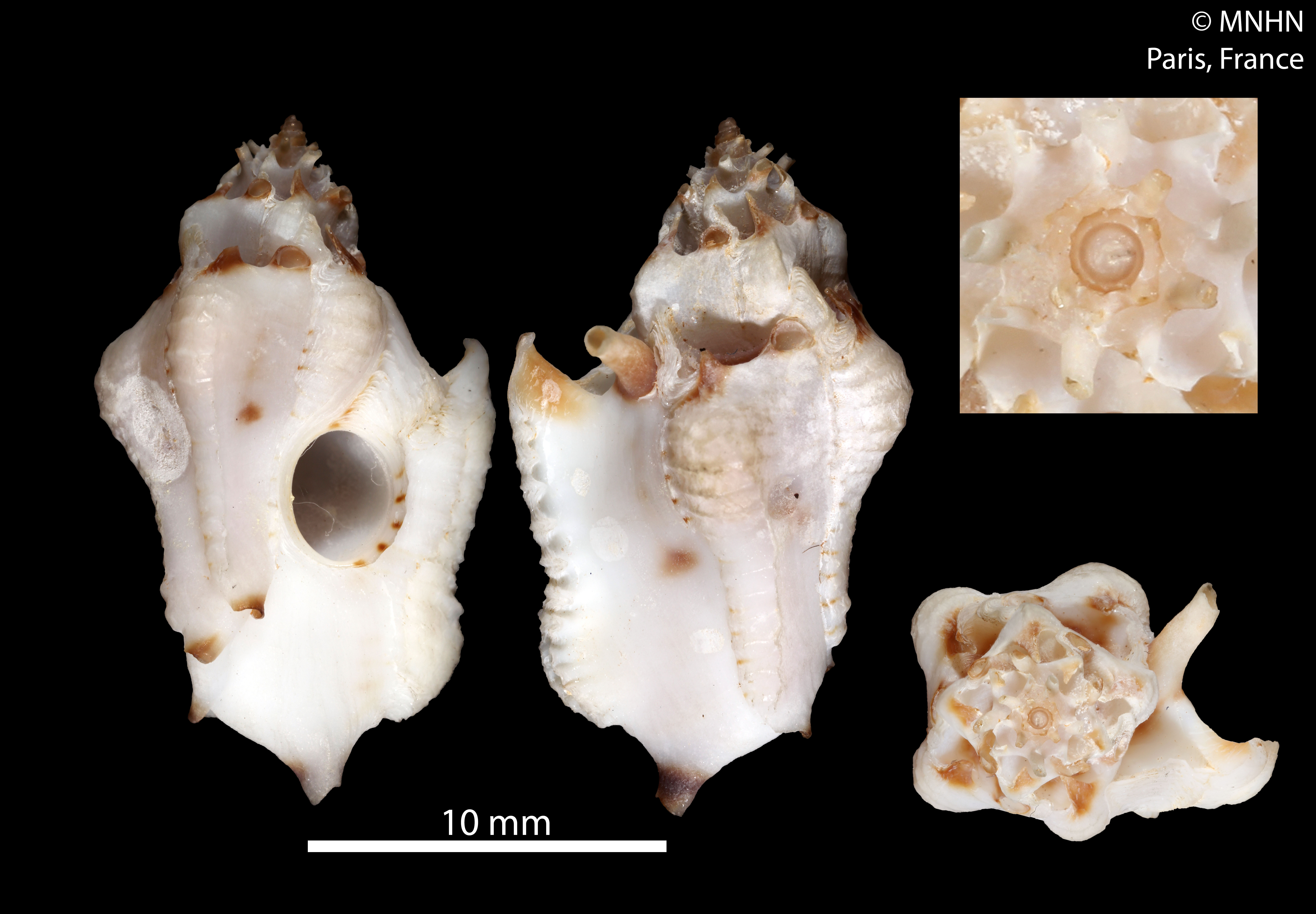
- Shell of Typhina carolskoglundae (paratype at MNHN, Paris)

Scientific classification
- Kingdom: Animalia
- Phylum: Mollusca
- Class: Gastropoda
- Subclass: Caenogastropoda
- Order: Neogastropoda
- Family: Muricidae
- Genus: Typhina
- Species: T. carolskoglundae

Binomial name
- Typhina carolskoglundae (Houart & Hertz, 2006)

Synonyms
- Typhisopsis carolskoglundae Houart & Hertz, 2006

= Typhina carolskoglundae =

Species of gastropod

Typhina carolskoglundae is a species of sea snail, a marine gastropod mollusk in the family Muricidae, the murex snails or rock snails.

== Description ==
The length of the shell attains 21.1 mm.

== Distribution ==
This marine spêcies was found off Cébaco Island, Panama.
