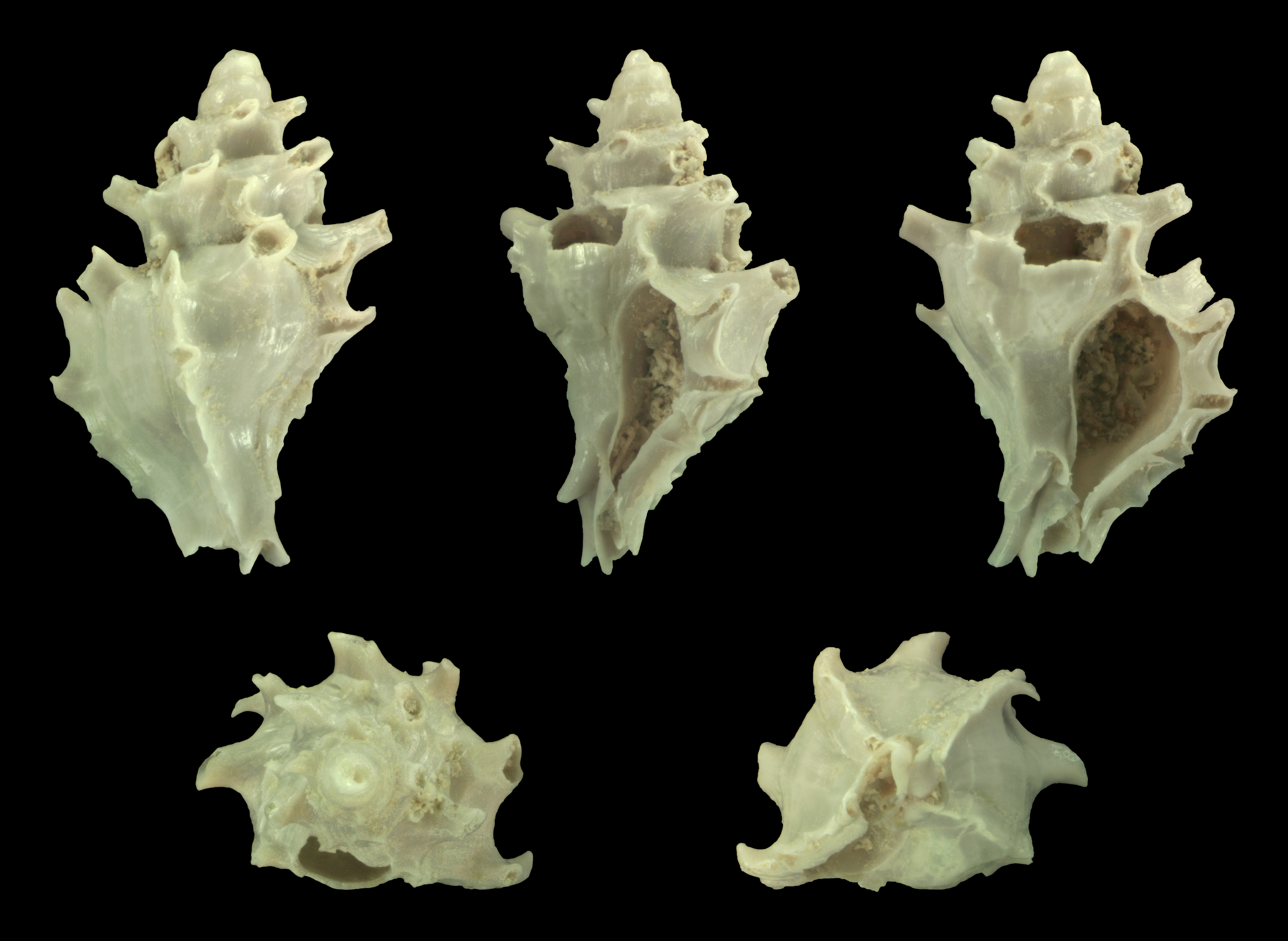

Scientific classification
- Kingdom: Animalia
- Phylum: Mollusca
- Class: Gastropoda
- Subclass: Caenogastropoda
- Order: Neogastropoda
- Family: Muricidae
- Genus: Typhis
- Species: T. tubifer

Binomial name
- Typhis tubifer Bruguière, 1792

= Typhis tubifer =

Species of gastropod

Typhis tubifer is a species of sea snail, a marine gastropod mollusk in the family Muricidae, the murex snails or rock snails.
