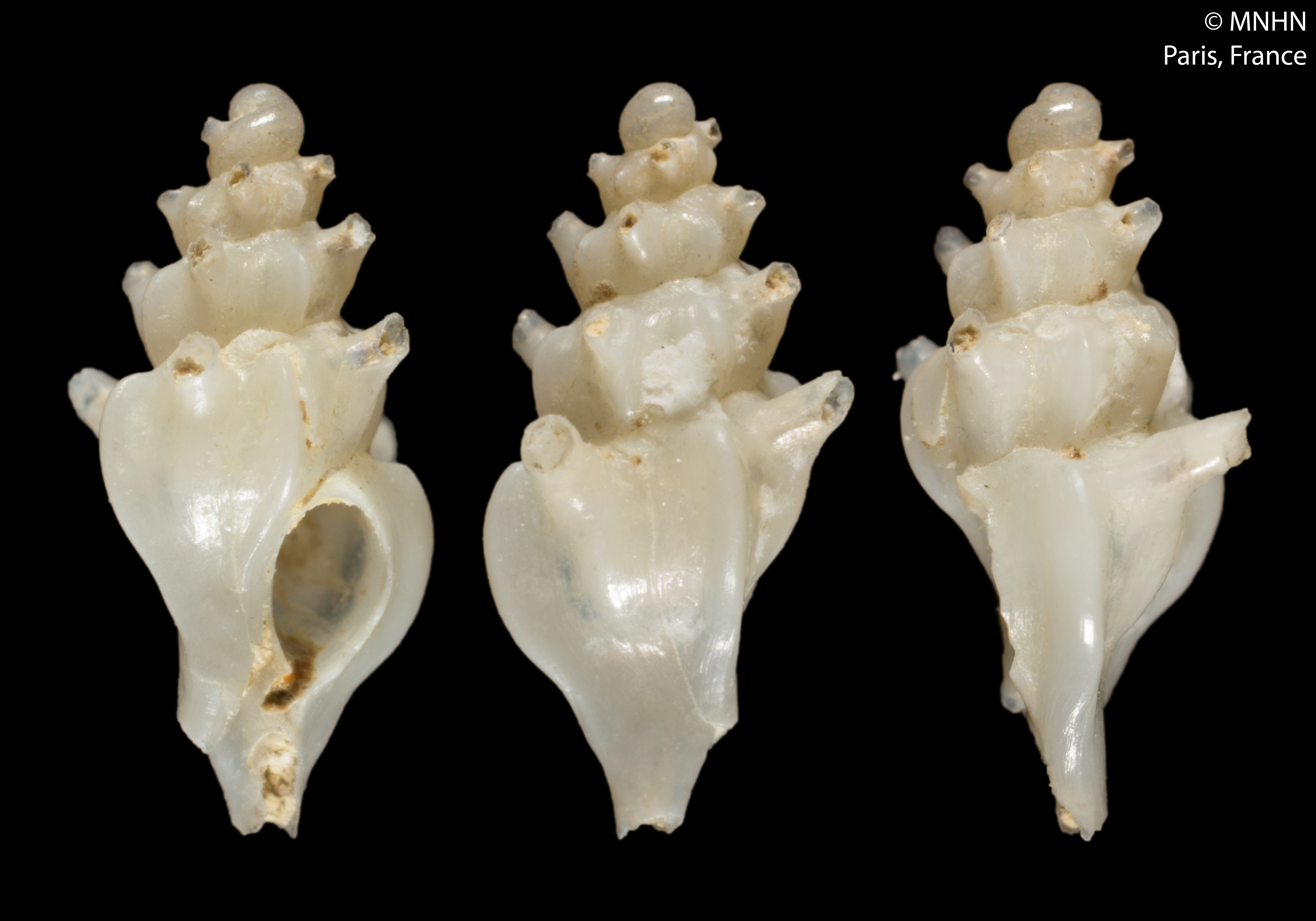

Scientific classification
- Kingdom: Animalia
- Phylum: Mollusca
- Class: Gastropoda
- Subclass: Caenogastropoda
- Order: Neogastropoda
- Family: Muricidae
- Genus: Laevityphis
- Species: L. tillierae

Binomial name
- Laevityphis tillierae (Houart, 1985)

Synonyms
- Siphonochelus (Laevityphis) tillierae Houart, 1985

= Laevityphis tillierae =

Species of mollusc

Laevityphis tillierae is a species of sea snail, a marine gastropod mollusk in the family Muricidae, the murex snails or rock snails.

== Distribution ==
This marine species occurs off New Caledonia.
