= Typhina claydoni =

Scientific classification
- Kingdom: Animalia
- Phylum: Mollusca
- Class: Gastropoda
- Subclass: Caenogastropoda
- Order: Neogastropoda
- Family: Muricidae
- Genus: Typhina
- Species: T. claydoni

Binomial name
- Typhina claydoni (Houart, 1988)

Synonyms
- Typhisopsis claydoni Houart, 1988 (original combination)

Species of gastropod

Typhina claydoni is a species of sea snail, a marine gastropod mollusk in the family Muricidae, the murex snails or rock snails.

== Distribution ==
This marine species occurs off Western Australia.
