= Typhinellus amoenus =

Scientific classification
- Kingdom: Animalia
- Phylum: Mollusca
- Class: Gastropoda
- Subclass: Caenogastropoda
- Order: Neogastropoda
- Family: Muricidae
- Genus: Typhinellus
- Species: T. amoenus

Binomial name
- Typhinellus amoenus Houart, 1994

Synonyms
- Typhinellus androyensis Bozzetti, 2007

Species of gastropod

Typhinellus amoenus is a species of sea snail, a marine gastropod mollusk in the family Muricidae, the murex snails or rock snails.

== Distribution ==
It is commonly found off the coast of Somalia.
