= Rugotyphis =

Scientific classification
- Kingdom: Animalia
- Phylum: Mollusca
- Class: Gastropoda
- Subclass: Caenogastropoda
- Order: Neogastropoda
- Superfamily: Muricoidea
- Family: Muricidae
- Subfamily: Typhinae
- Genus: †Rugotyphis; Vella, 1961

Synonyms
- † Typhis (Rugotyphis) Vella, 1961

Extinct genus of gastropods

Rugotyphis is an extinct genus of sea snails, marine gastropod mollusks, in the family Muricidae, the murex snails or rock snails.

== Species ==
Species within the genus Rugotyphis include:

- † Rugotyphis francescae (Finlay, 1924)
- † Rugotyphis secundus Vella, 1961
- † Rugotyphis vellai (Maxwell, 1971)
