= Typhis ramosus =

Scientific classification
- Kingdom: Animalia
- Phylum: Mollusca
- Class: Gastropoda
- Subclass: Caenogastropoda
- Order: Neogastropoda
- Family: Muricidae
- Genus: Typhis
- Species: T. ramosus

Binomial name
- Typhis ramosus Habe & Kosuge, 1971

Synonyms
- Typhis ramosus Habe & Kosuge, 1971

Species of gastropod

Typhis ramosus is a species of sea snail, a marine gastropod mollusk in the family Muricidae, the murex snails or rock snails.
