= Hirtotyphis trispinosus =

Scientific classification
- Kingdom: Animalia
- Phylum: Mollusca
- Class: Gastropoda
- Subclass: Caenogastropoda
- Order: Neogastropoda
- Family: Muricidae
- Genus: Hirtotyphis
- Species: H. trispinosus

Binomial name
- Hirtotyphis trispinosus Houart, 1991

Synonyms
- Typhis (Hirtotyphis) trispinosus (Houart, 1991); Typhis trispinosus (Houart, 1991) ·

Species of gastropod

Hirtotyphis trispinosus is a species of sea snail, a marine gastropod mollusk in the family Muricidae, the murex snails or rock snails.
