= Choreotyphis pavlova =

Scientific classification
- Kingdom: Animalia
- Phylum: Mollusca
- Class: Gastropoda
- Subclass: Caenogastropoda
- Order: Neogastropoda
- Family: Muricidae
- Genus: Choreotyphis
- Species: C. pavlova

Binomial name
- Choreotyphis pavlova (Iredale, 1936)

Synonyms
- Siphonochelus (Choreotyphis) pavlova (Iredale, 1936) · alternate representation; Siphonochelus (Trubatsa) pavlova (Iredale, 1936) · unaccepted; Siphonochelus pavlova (Iredale, 1936); Typhina pavlova Iredale, 1936

Species of gastropod

Choreotyphis pavlova is a species of sea snail, a marine gastropod mollusk in the family Muricidae, the murex snails or rock snails.
