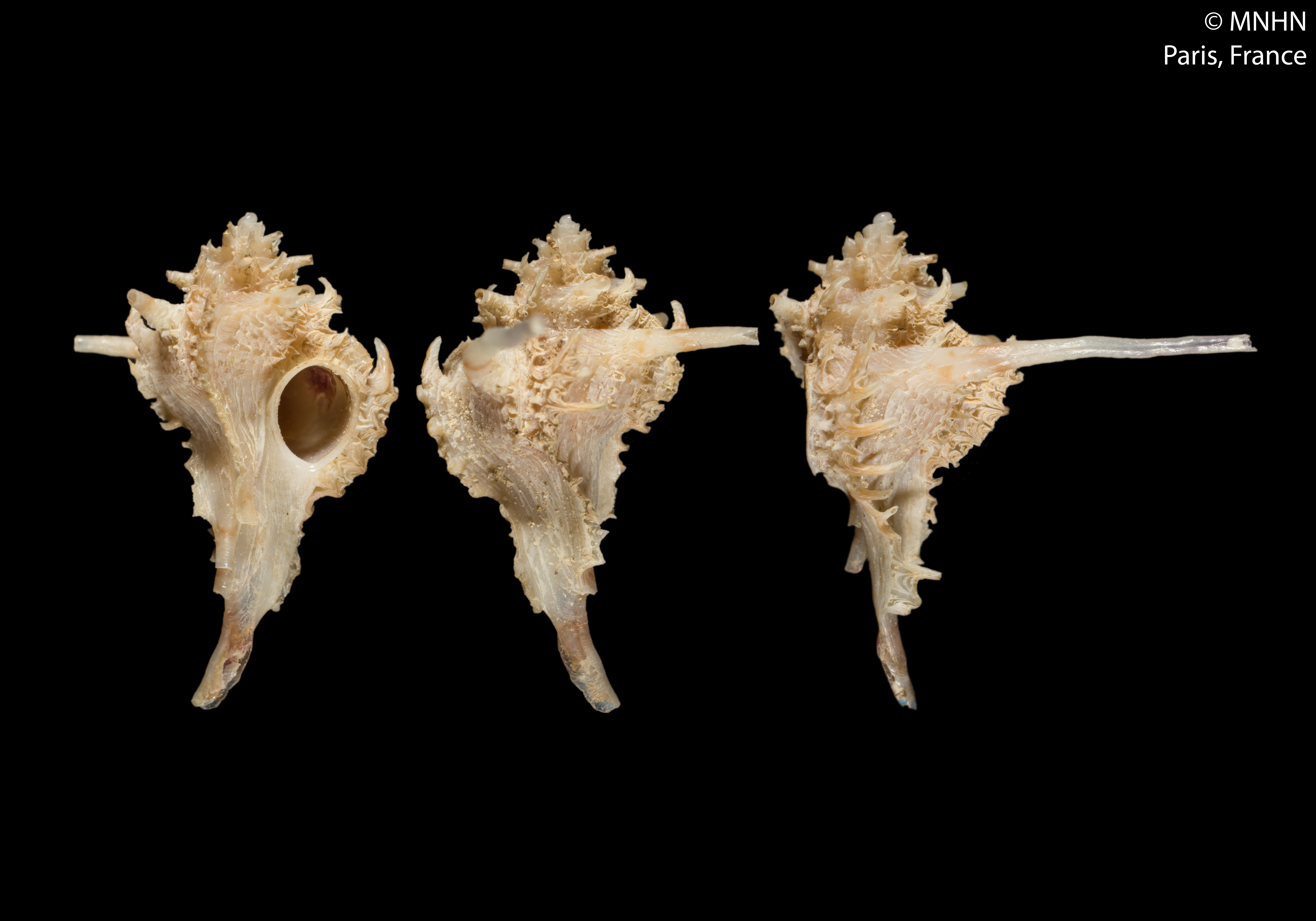
- Monstrotyphis carolinae

Scientific classification
- Kingdom: Animalia
- Phylum: Mollusca
- Class: Gastropoda
- Subclass: Caenogastropoda
- Order: Neogastropoda
- Superfamily: Muricoidea
- Family: Muricidae
- Subfamily: Typhinae; Cossmann, 1903

Genera
- See text

= Typhinae =

Subfamily of gastropods

Typhinae is a subfamily in the family Muricidae.

== Genera ==
According to the World Register of Marine Species, the subfamily Trophoninae contains 15 genera:

- Brasityphis Absalão & Santos, 2003
- Choreotyphis Iredale, 1936
- Distichotyphis Keen & Campbell, 1964
- Haustellotyphis Jousseaume, 1880
- Hirtotyphis Jousseaume, 1880
- Laevityphis Cossmann, 1903
- Lyrotyphis Jousseaume, 1880
- Monstrotyphis Habe, 1961
- Pilsbrytyphis Woodring, 1959
- Rugotyphis Vella, 1961
- Siphonochelus Jousseaume, 1880
- Trubatsa Dall, 1889
- Typhina Jousseaume, 1880
- Typhinellus Jousseaume, 1880
- Typhis Montfort, 1810

Synonyms

- † Indotyphis Keen, 1944: synonym of † Laevityphis (Indotyphis) Keen, 1944 (uncertain status)
- Talityphis Jousseaume, 1882 : synonym of Typhina Jousseaume, 1880 (junior synonym)
- Typhisala Jousseaume, 1881: synonym of Typhina Jousseaume, 1880 (junior synonym)
- Typhisopsis Jousseaume, 1880: synonym of Typhina Jousseaume, 1880 (junior synonym)
