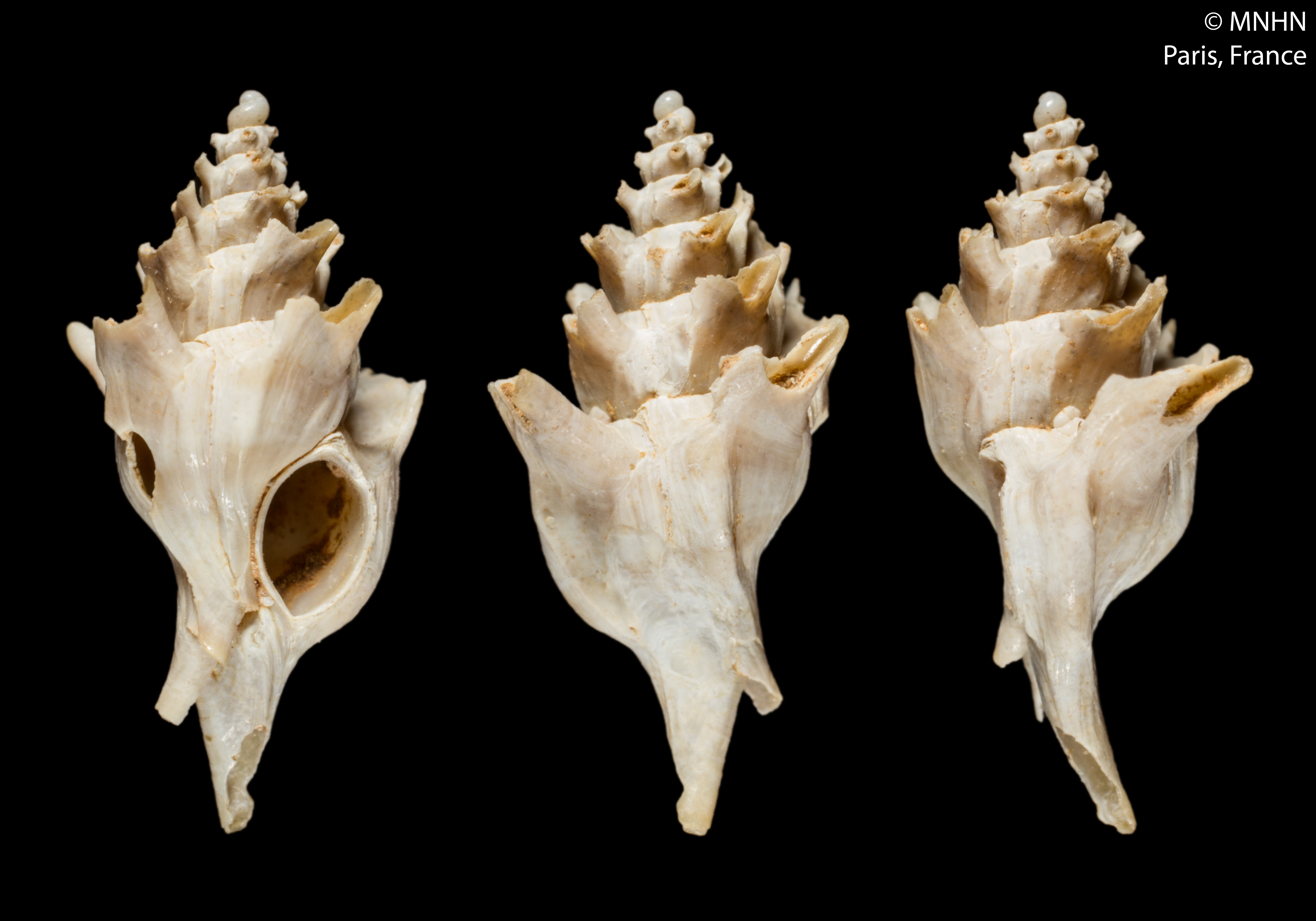
- Shell of Siphonochelus aethomorpha (holotype at MNHN, Paris)

Scientific classification
- Kingdom: Animalia
- Phylum: Mollusca
- Class: Gastropoda
- Subclass: Caenogastropoda
- Order: Neogastropoda
- Superfamily: Muricoidea
- Family: Muricidae
- Subfamily: Typhinae
- Genus: Siphonochelus; Jousseaume, 1880

Type species
- Typhis arcuatus Hinds, 1843

Synonyms
- Siphonochelus (Choreotyphis) Iredale, 1936 · alternate representation; Siphonochelus (Siphonochelus) Jousseaume, 1880 · alternate representation; Typhis (Siphonochelus) Jousseaume, 1880 ·

= Siphonochelus =

Genus of gastropods

Siphonochelus is a genus of sea snails, marine gastropod mollusks in the family Muricidae, the murex snails or rock snails.

It was first described by Félix Pierre Jousseaume in 1880.

== Species ==
Species within the genus Siphonochelus include:

- Siphonochelus aethomorpha Houart & Héros, 2015
- Siphonochelus angustus Houart, 1991
- Siphonochelus arcuatus (Hinds, 1843)
- Siphonochelus boucheti Houart, 1991
- † Siphonochelus fistulosus (Brocchi, 1814)
- Siphonochelus generosus Iredale, 1936
- Siphonochelus hasegawai Houart, Buge & Zuccon, 2021
- Siphonochelus japonicus (A. Adams, 1863)
- Siphonochelus mozambicus Houart, 2017
- Siphonochelus nipponensis Keen & Campbell, 1964
- Siphonochelus pentaphasios (Barnard, 1959)
- Siphonochelus radwini Emerson & D'Attilio, 1979
- Siphonochelus riosi (Bertsch & D'Attilio, 1980)
- Siphonochelus rosadoi Houart, 1999
- Siphonochelus solus Vella, 1961
- Siphonochelus stillacandidus Houart, 1985
- Siphonochelus syringianus (Hedley, 1903)
- Siphonochelus transcurrens (Martens, 1902)

Brought into synonymy

- Siphonochelus (Laevityphis) Cossmann, 1903: synonym of Laevityphis Cossmann, 1903
- Siphonochelus (Trubatsa) Dall, 1889 : synonym of Trubatsa Dall, 1889
- Siphonochelus erythrostigma Keen & Campbell, 1964: synonym of Choreotyphis erythrostigma (Keen & Campbell, 1964) (original combination)
- Siphonochelus longicornis (Dall, 1888): synonym of Trubatsa lozoueti (Houart, 1991)
- Siphonochelus lozoueti Houart, 1991: synonym of Trubatsa lozoueti (Houart, 1991)
- Siphonochelus pavlova (Iredale, 1936): synonym of Choreotyphis pavlova (Iredale, 1936)
- Siphonochelus saltantis Houart, 1991: synonym of Trubatsa saltantis (Houart, 1991)
- Siphonochelus tityrus (Bayer, 1971): synonym of Trubatsa tityrus (Bayer, 1971)
- Siphonochelus undulatus Houart, 1991: synonym of Trubatsa undulata (Houart, 1991)
- Siphonochelus unicornis Houart, 1991: synonym of Trubatsa unicornis (Houart, 1991)
- Siphonochelus virginiae (Houart, 1986): synonym of Trubatsa virginiae (Houart, 1986)
- Siphonochelus wolffi Houart, 2013: synonym of Trubatsa wolffi (Houart, 2013) (original combination)
