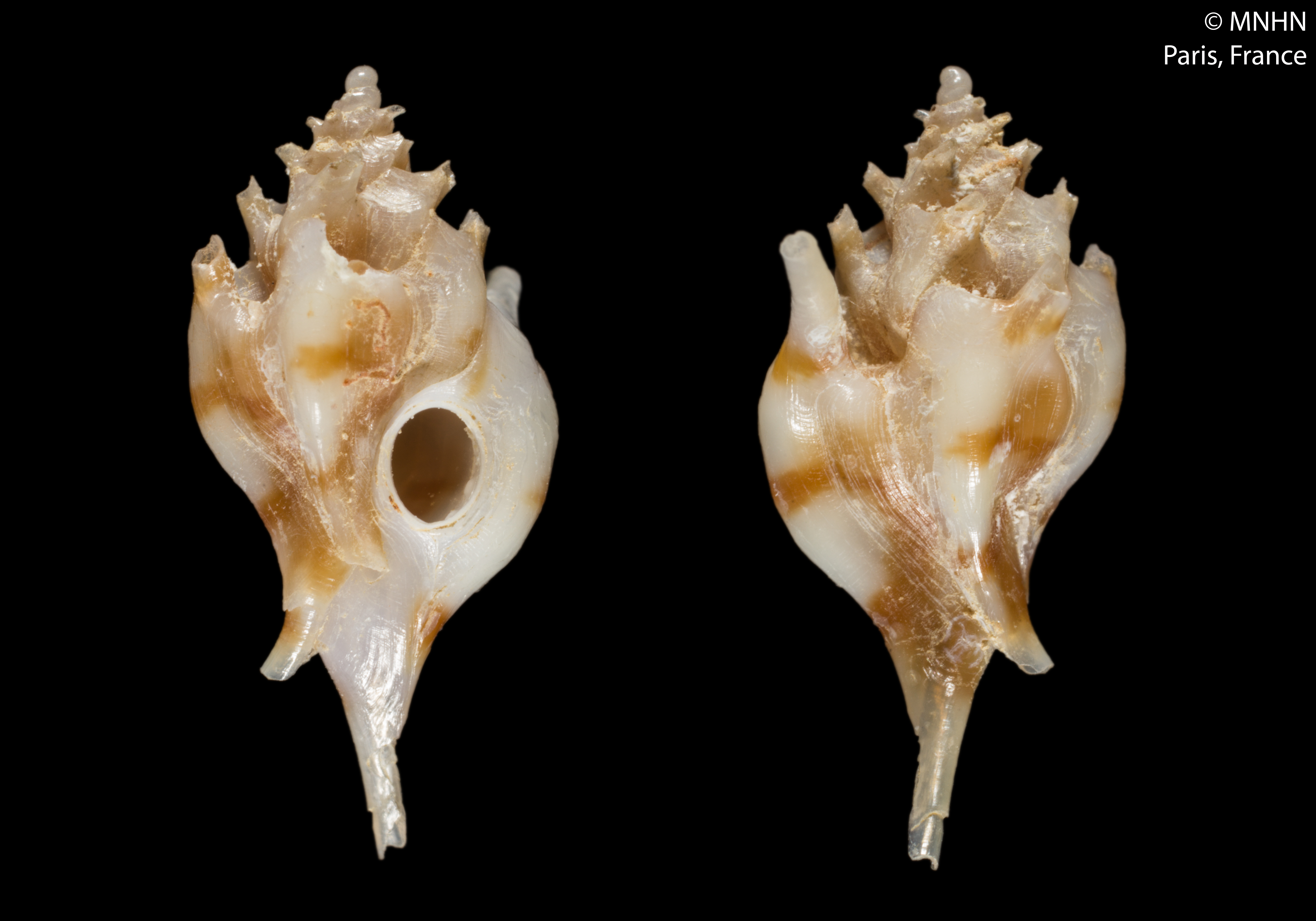

Scientific classification
- Kingdom: Animalia
- Phylum: Mollusca
- Class: Gastropoda
- Subclass: Caenogastropoda
- Order: Neogastropoda
- Superfamily: Muricoidea
- Family: Muricidae
- Subfamily: Typhinae
- Genus: Siphonochelus
- Species: S. wolffi

Binomial name
- Siphonochelus wolffi Houart, 2013

Synonyms
- Siphonochelus (Trubatsa) wolffi Houart, 2013

= Siphonochelus wolffi =

Species of gastropod

Siphonochelus wolffi is a species of sea snail, a marine gastropod mollusk, in the family Muricidae, the murex snails or rock snails.
