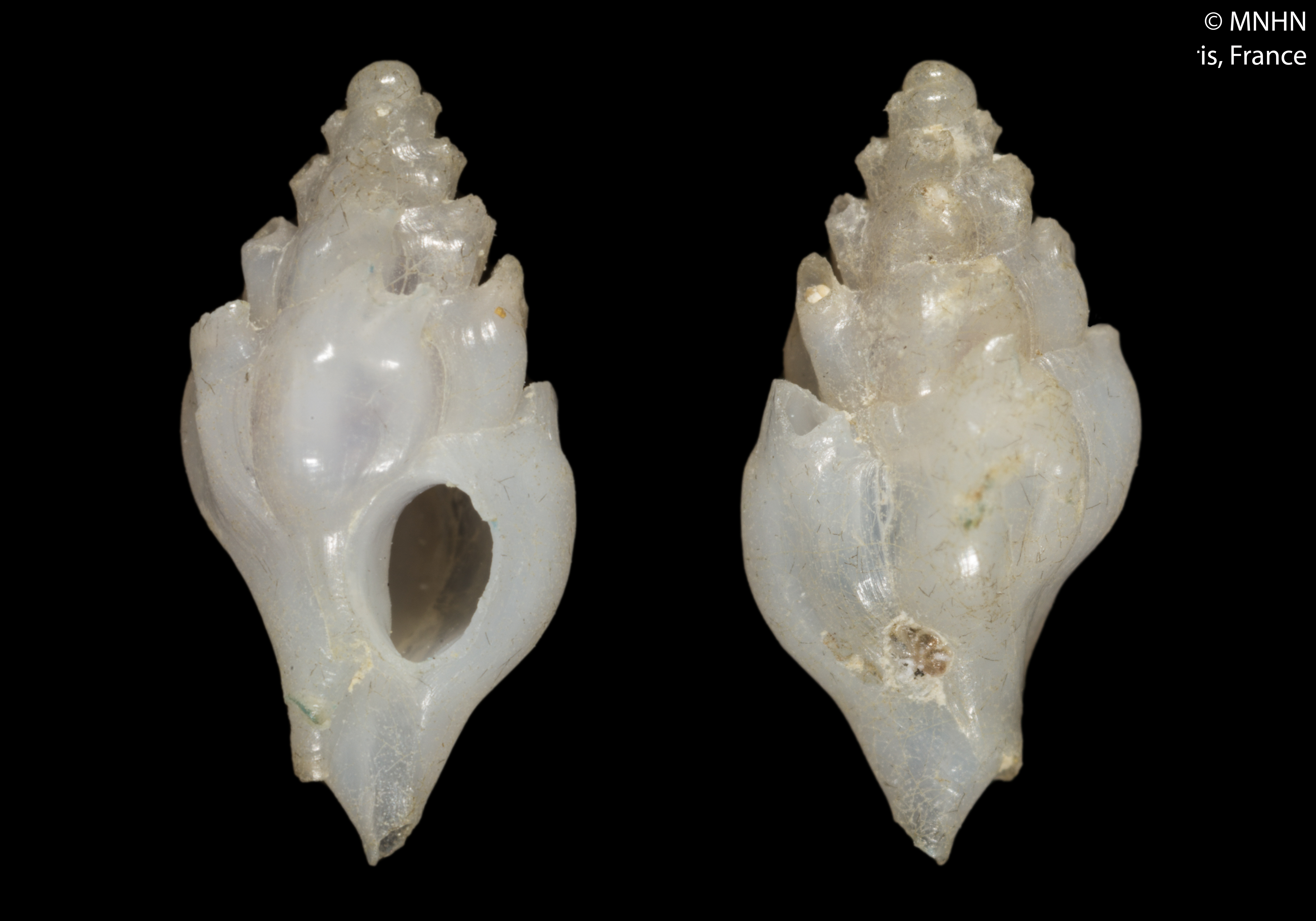
- Shell of Siphonochelus angustus (holotype at MNHN, Paris)

Scientific classification
- Kingdom: Animalia
- Phylum: Mollusca
- Class: Gastropoda
- Subclass: Caenogastropoda
- Order: Neogastropoda
- Family: Muricidae
- Genus: Siphonochelus
- Species: S. angustus

Binomial name
- Siphonochelus angustus Houart, 1991

Synonyms
- Siphonochelus (Siphonochelus) angustus Houart, 1991

= Siphonochelus angustus =

Species of gastropod

Siphonochelus angustus is a species of sea snail, a marine gastropod mollusk in the family Muricidae, the murex snails or rock snails.

== Description ==
The length of the shell attains 6.7 mm.

== Distribution ==
This marine species occurs in the Coral Sea off the Lord Howe ridge
