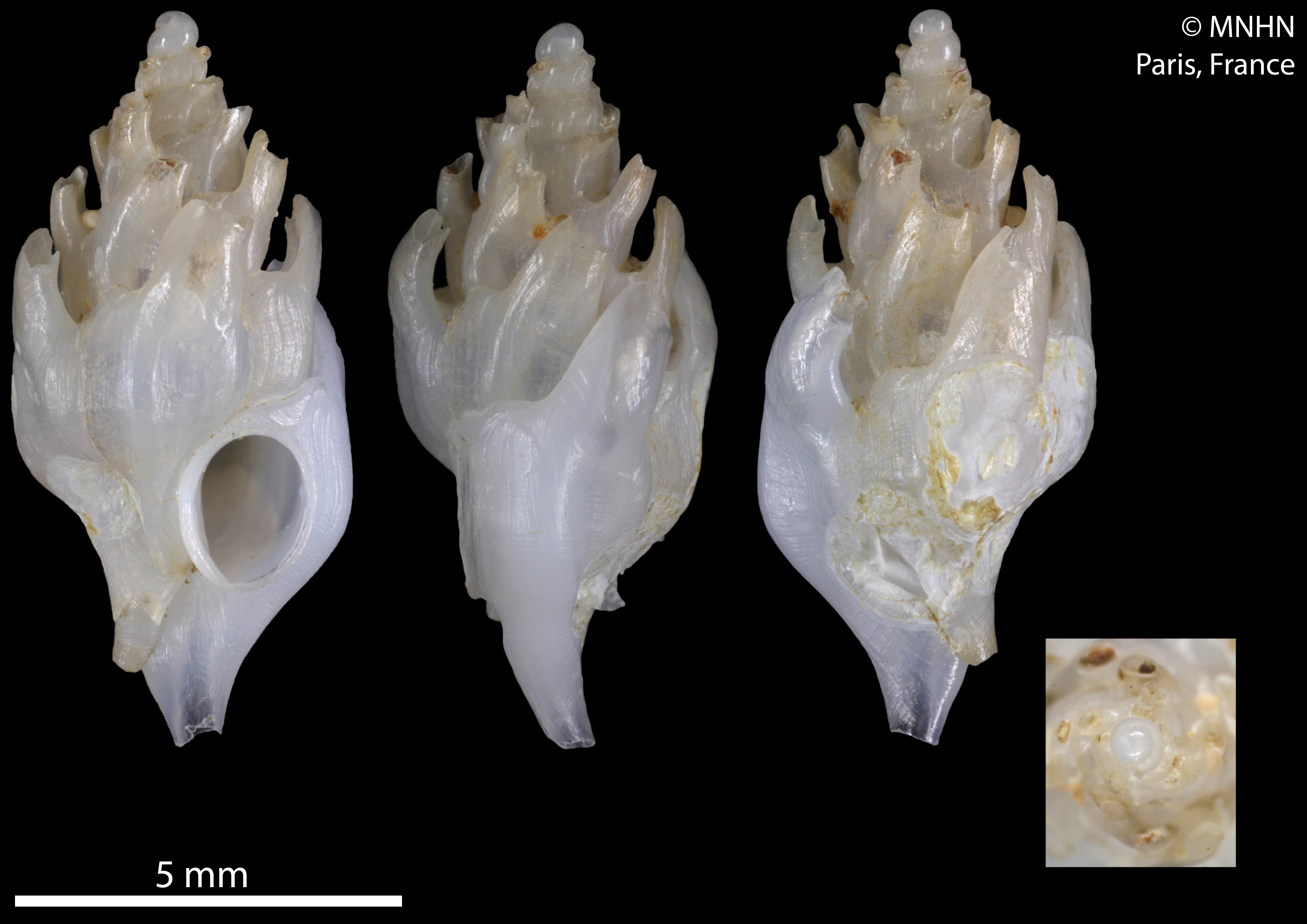
- Shell of Siphonochelus nipponensis (specimen at MNHN, Paris)

Scientific classification
- Kingdom: Animalia
- Phylum: Mollusca
- Class: Gastropoda
- Subclass: Caenogastropoda
- Order: Neogastropoda
- Family: Muricidae
- Genus: Siphonochelus
- Species: S. nipponensis

Binomial name
- Siphonochelus nipponensis Keen & Campbell, 1964

Synonyms
- Siphonochelus nipponensis Keen & Campbell, 1964

= Siphonochelus nipponensis =

Species of gastropod

Siphonochelus nipponensis is a species of sea snail, a marine gastropod mollusk in the family Muricidae, the murex snails or rock snails.

== Distribution ==
This marine species occurs off Papua New Guinea.
