= Siphonochelus syringianus =

Scientific classification
- Kingdom: Animalia
- Phylum: Mollusca
- Class: Gastropoda
- Subclass: Caenogastropoda
- Order: Neogastropoda
- Family: Muricidae
- Genus: Siphonochelus
- Species: S. syringianus

Binomial name
- Siphonochelus syringianus (Hedley, 1903)

Synonyms
- Typhis syringianus Hedley, 1903

Species of gastropod

Siphonochelus syringianus is a species of sea snail, a marine gastropod mollusk in the family Muricidae, the murex snails or rock snails.

== Description ==
Each whorl sculptured with 4 or 5 double varices, each consisting of two strong, smooth axial folds. A single erect, backwards-pointing hollow posterior siphonal tube situated on the shoulder between the folds of each varix. Scar of former outer lip in hollow between each double varix. Anterior canal completely closed, about equal in length to aperture. Colour fawn, sometimes with a broad spiral white band on the body whorl.
