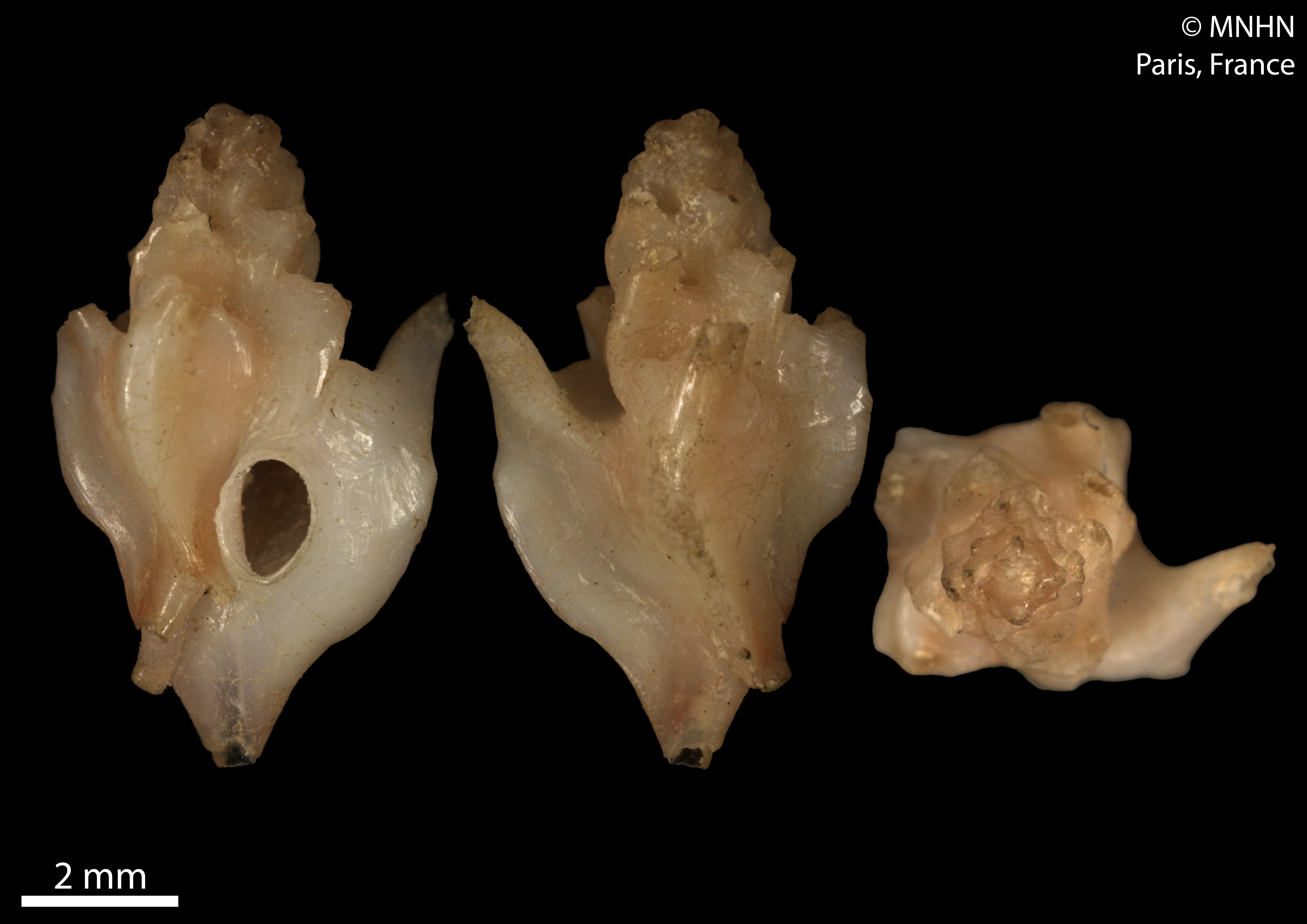
- Shell of Trubatsa longicornis (holotype at MNHN, Paris)

Scientific classification
- Kingdom: Animalia
- Phylum: Mollusca
- Class: Gastropoda
- Subclass: Caenogastropoda
- Order: Neogastropoda
- Family: Muricidae
- Genus: Trubatsa
- Species: T. longicornis

Binomial name
- Trubatsa longicornis (Dall, 1888)

Synonyms
- Siphonochelus (Trubatsa) longicornis (Dall, 1888); Siphonochelus longicornis (Dall, 1888); Typhis (Trubatsa) longicornis Dall, 1888; Typhis longicornis Dall, 1888 (original combination)

= Trubatsa longicornis =

Species of gastropod

Trubatsa longicornis is a species of sea snail, a marine gastropod mollusk in the family Muricidae, the murex snails or rock snails.

== Description ==
The length of the shell attains 8.6 mm.

== Distribution ==
This marine species occurs off Guadeloupe.
