= Siphonochelus riosi =

Scientific classification
- Kingdom: Animalia
- Phylum: Mollusca
- Class: Gastropoda
- Subclass: Caenogastropoda
- Order: Neogastropoda
- Family: Muricidae
- Genus: Siphonochelus
- Species: S. riosi

Binomial name
- Siphonochelus riosi (Bertsch & D'Attilio, 1980)

Synonyms
- Typhina riosi Bertsch & D'Attilio, 1980

Species of gastropod

Siphonochelus riosi is a species of sea snail, a marine gastropod mollusk in the family Muricidae, the murex snails or rock snails.
