= Siphonochelus fistulosus =

Scientific classification
- Kingdom: Animalia
- Phylum: Mollusca
- Class: Gastropoda
- Subclass: Caenogastropoda
- Order: Neogastropoda
- Superfamily: Muricoidea
- Family: Muricidae
- Subfamily: Typhinae
- Genus: Siphonochelus
- Species: †S. fistulosus

Binomial name
- †Siphonochelus fistulosus Brocchi, 1814

Synonyms
- Murex fistulosus Brocchi, 1814; Typhis fistulosus (Brocchi, 1814)

Extinct species of gastropod

Siphonochelus fistulosus is an extinct species of sea snail, a marine gastropod mollusk, in the family Muricidae, the murex snails or rock snails.
