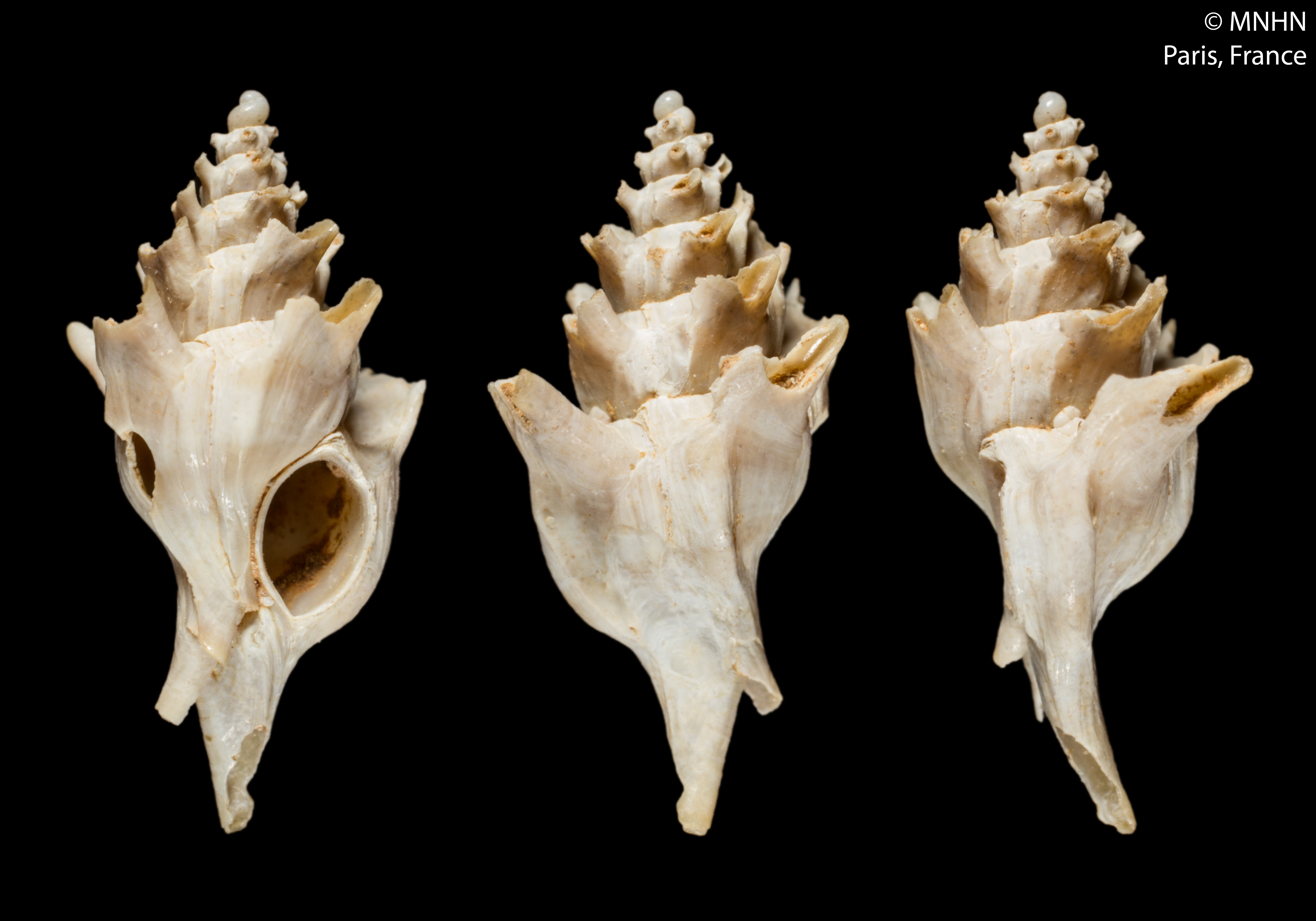
- Shell of Siphonochelus aethomorpha (holotype at MNHN, Paris)

Scientific classification
- Kingdom: Animalia
- Phylum: Mollusca
- Class: Gastropoda
- Subclass: Caenogastropoda
- Order: Neogastropoda
- Superfamily: Muricoidea
- Family: Muricidae
- Subfamily: Typhinae
- Genus: Siphonochelus
- Species: S. aethomorpha

Binomial name
- Siphonochelus aethomorpha Houart & Héros, 2015

Synonyms
- Siphonochelus (Siphonochelus) aethomorpha Houart & Héros, 2015

= Siphonochelus aethomorpha =

Species of gastropod

Siphonochelus aethomorpha is a species of sea snail, a marine gastropod mollusk, in the family Muricidae, the murex snails or rock snails.

== Distribution ==
This marine species occurs off Madagascar.
