= Siphonochelus arcuatus =

Scientific classification
- Kingdom: Animalia
- Phylum: Mollusca
- Class: Gastropoda
- Subclass: Caenogastropoda
- Order: Neogastropoda
- Family: Muricidae
- Genus: Siphonochelus
- Species: S. arcuatus

Binomial name
- Siphonochelus arcuatus (Hinds, 1843)

Synonyms
- Typhis arcuatus Hinds, 1843; Typhis duplicatus Sowerby, 1870

Species of gastropod

Siphonochelus arcuatus is a species of sea snail, a marine gastropod mollusk in the family Muricidae, the murex snails or rock snails.
