= Siphonochelus solus =

Scientific classification
- Kingdom: Animalia
- Phylum: Mollusca
- Class: Gastropoda
- Subclass: Caenogastropoda
- Order: Neogastropoda
- Family: Muricidae
- Genus: Siphonochelus
- Species: S. solus

Binomial name
- Siphonochelus solus Vella, 1961

Synonyms
- Siphonochelus solus Vella, 1961

Species of gastropod

Siphonochelus solus is a species of sea snail, a marine gastropod mollusk in the family Muricidae, the murex snails or rock snails.
