= Siphonochelus transcurrens =

Scientific classification
- Kingdom: Animalia
- Phylum: Mollusca
- Class: Gastropoda
- Subclass: Caenogastropoda
- Order: Neogastropoda
- Family: Muricidae
- Genus: Siphonochelus
- Species: S. transcurrens

Binomial name
- Siphonochelus transcurrens (Martens, 1902)

Synonyms
- Typhis transcurrens Martens, 1902

Species of gastropod

Siphonochelus transcurrens is a species of sea snail, a marine gastropod mollusk in the family Muricidae, the murex snails or rock snails.
