= Siphonochelus radwini =

Scientific classification
- Kingdom: Animalia
- Phylum: Mollusca
- Class: Gastropoda
- Subclass: Caenogastropoda
- Order: Neogastropoda
- Family: Muricidae
- Genus: Siphonochelus
- Species: S. radwini

Binomial name
- Siphonochelus radwini Emerson & D'Attilio, 1979

Synonyms
- Siphonochelus radwini Emerson & D'Attilio, 1979

Species of gastropod

Siphonochelus radwini is a species of sea snail, a marine gastropod mollusk in the family Muricidae, the murex snails or rock snails.
