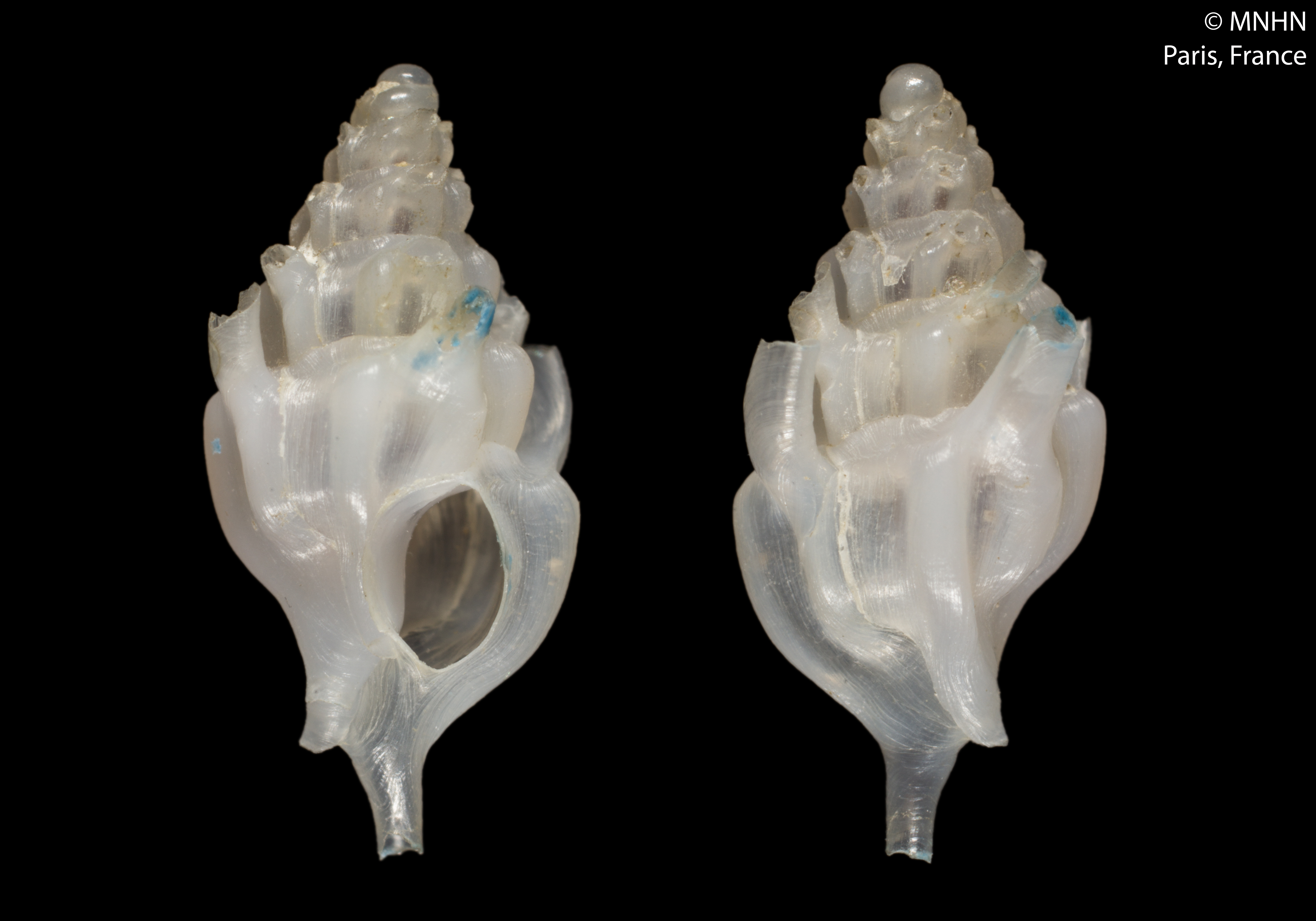
- Shell of Siphonochelus boucheti (holotype at MNHN, Paris)

Scientific classification
- Kingdom: Animalia
- Phylum: Mollusca
- Class: Gastropoda
- Subclass: Caenogastropoda
- Order: Neogastropoda
- Family: Muricidae
- Genus: Siphonochelus
- Species: S. boucheti

Binomial name
- Siphonochelus boucheti Houart, 1991

Synonyms
- Siphonochelus (Siphonochelus) boucheti Houart, 1991

= Siphonochelus boucheti =

Species of gastropod

Siphonochelus boucheti is a species of sea snail, a marine gastropod mollusk in the family Muricidae, the murex snails or rock snails.

== Distribution ==
This marine species occurs off the Norfolk Ridge, New Caledonia.
