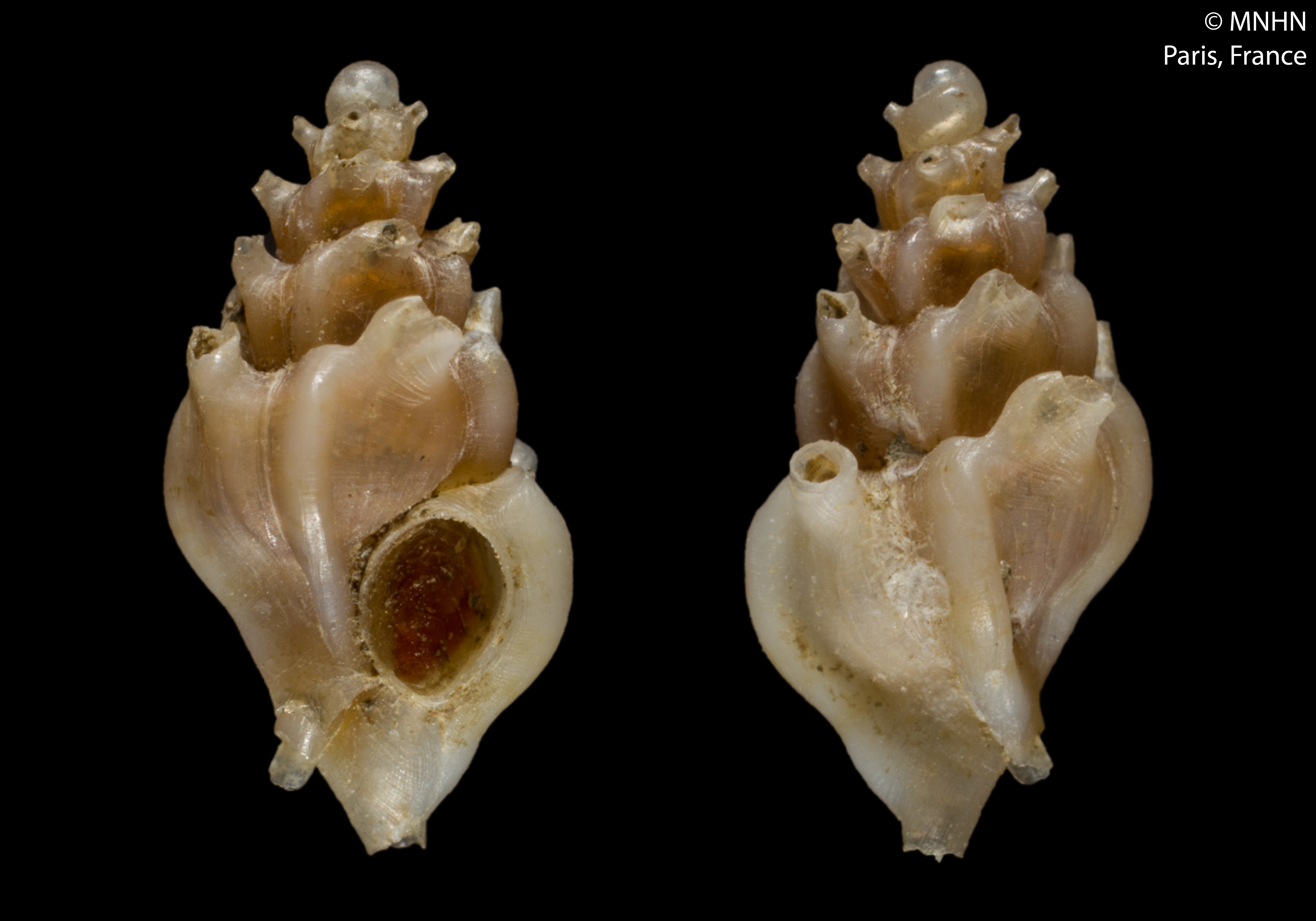
- Shell of Siphonochelus mozambicus (holotype at MNHN, Paris)

Scientific classification
- Kingdom: Animalia
- Phylum: Mollusca
- Class: Gastropoda
- Subclass: Caenogastropoda
- Order: Neogastropoda
- Superfamily: Muricoidea
- Family: Muricidae
- Subfamily: Typhinae
- Genus: Siphonochelus
- Species: S. mozambicus

Binomial name
- Siphonochelus mozambicus Houart, 2017

Synonyms
- Siphonochelus (Siphonochelus) mozambicus Houart, 2017

= Siphonochelus mozambicus =

Species of gastropod

Siphonochelus mozambicus is a species of sea snail, a marine gastropod mollusk, in the family Muricidae, the murex snails or rock snails.

== Description ==
The length of the shell attains 53.9 mm.

== Distribution ==
This marine species occurs in the Mozambique Channel.
