= Siphonochelus rosadoi =

Scientific classification
- Kingdom: Animalia
- Phylum: Mollusca
- Class: Gastropoda
- Subclass: Caenogastropoda
- Order: Neogastropoda
- Family: Muricidae
- Genus: Siphonochelus
- Species: S. rosadoi

Binomial name
- Siphonochelus rosadoi Houart, 1999

Synonyms
- Siphonochelus rosadoi Houart, 1999

Species of gastropod

Siphonochelus rosadoi is a species of sea snail, a marine gastropod mollusk in the family Muricidae, the murex snails or rock snails.
