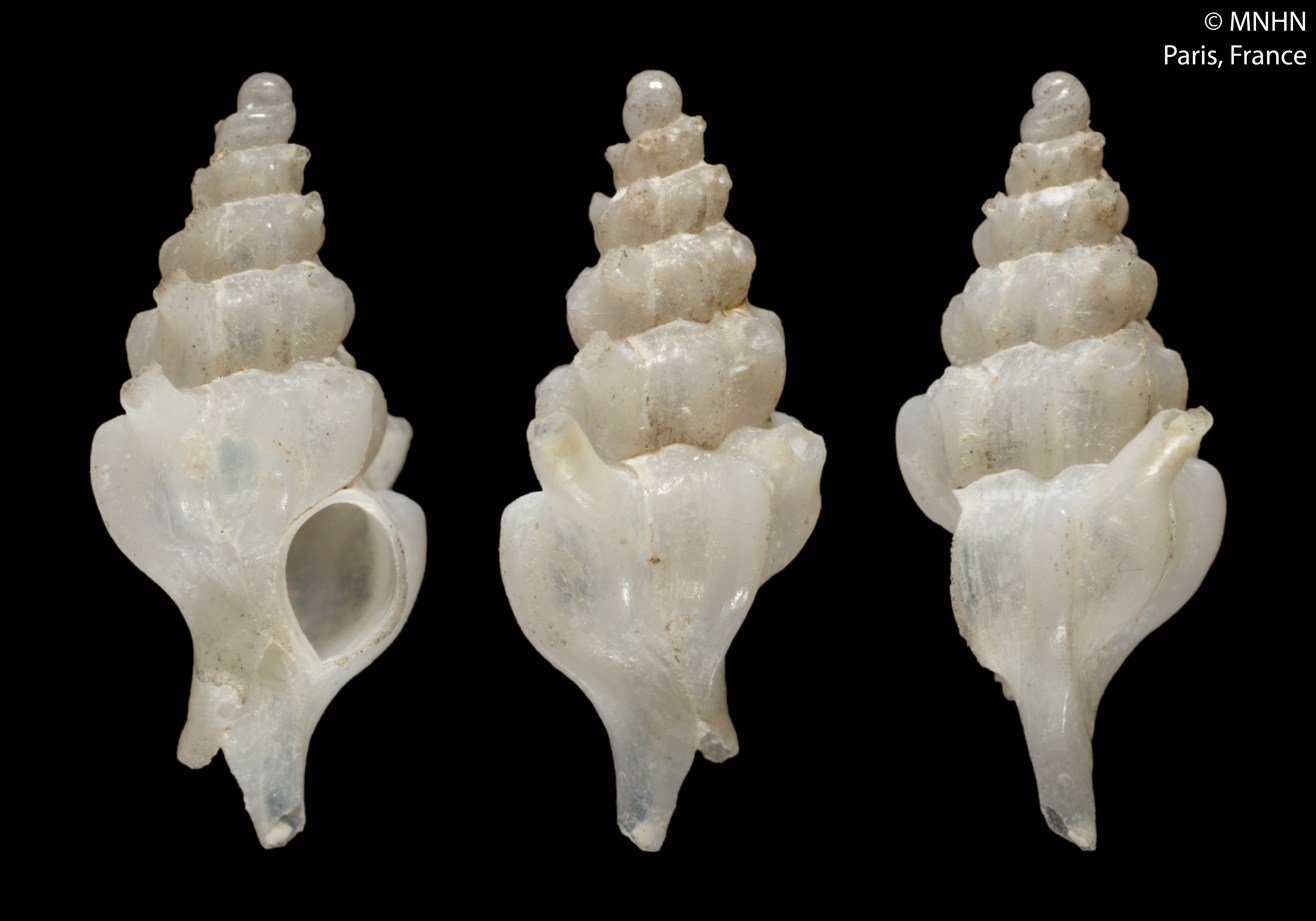
- Shell of Siphonochelus stillacandidus(holotype at MNHN, Paris)

Scientific classification
- Kingdom: Animalia
- Phylum: Mollusca
- Class: Gastropoda
- Subclass: Caenogastropoda
- Order: Neogastropoda
- Family: Muricidae
- Genus: Siphonochelus
- Species: S. stillacandidus

Binomial name
- Siphonochelus stillacandidus Houart, 1985

Synonyms
- Siphonochelus stillacandidus Houart, 1985

= Siphonochelus stillacandidus =

Species of mollusc

Siphonochelus stillacandidus is a species of sea snail, a marine gastropod mollusk in the family Muricidae, the murex snails or rock snails.

== Description ==
The length of the shell attains 8.4 mm.

== Distribution ==
This marine species occurs in the Mozambique Channel.
