= Siphonochelus pentaphasios =

Scientific classification
- Kingdom: Animalia
- Phylum: Mollusca
- Class: Gastropoda
- Subclass: Caenogastropoda
- Order: Neogastropoda
- Family: Muricidae
- Genus: Siphonochelus
- Species: S. pentaphasios

Binomial name
- Siphonochelus pentaphasios (Barnard, 1959)

Synonyms
- Typhis pentaphasios Barnard, 1959

Species of gastropod

Siphonochelus pentaphasios is a species of sea snail, a marine gastropod mollusk in the family Muricidae, the murex snails or rock snails.
