= Siphonochelus generosus =

Scientific classification
- Kingdom: Animalia
- Phylum: Mollusca
- Class: Gastropoda
- Subclass: Caenogastropoda
- Order: Neogastropoda
- Family: Muricidae
- Genus: Siphonochelus
- Species: S. generosus

Binomial name
- Siphonochelus generosus Iredale, 1936

Synonyms
- Siphonochelus generosus Iredale, 1936

Species of gastropod

Siphonochelus generosus is a species of sea snail, a marine gastropod mollusk in the family Muricidae, the murex snails or rock snails.
