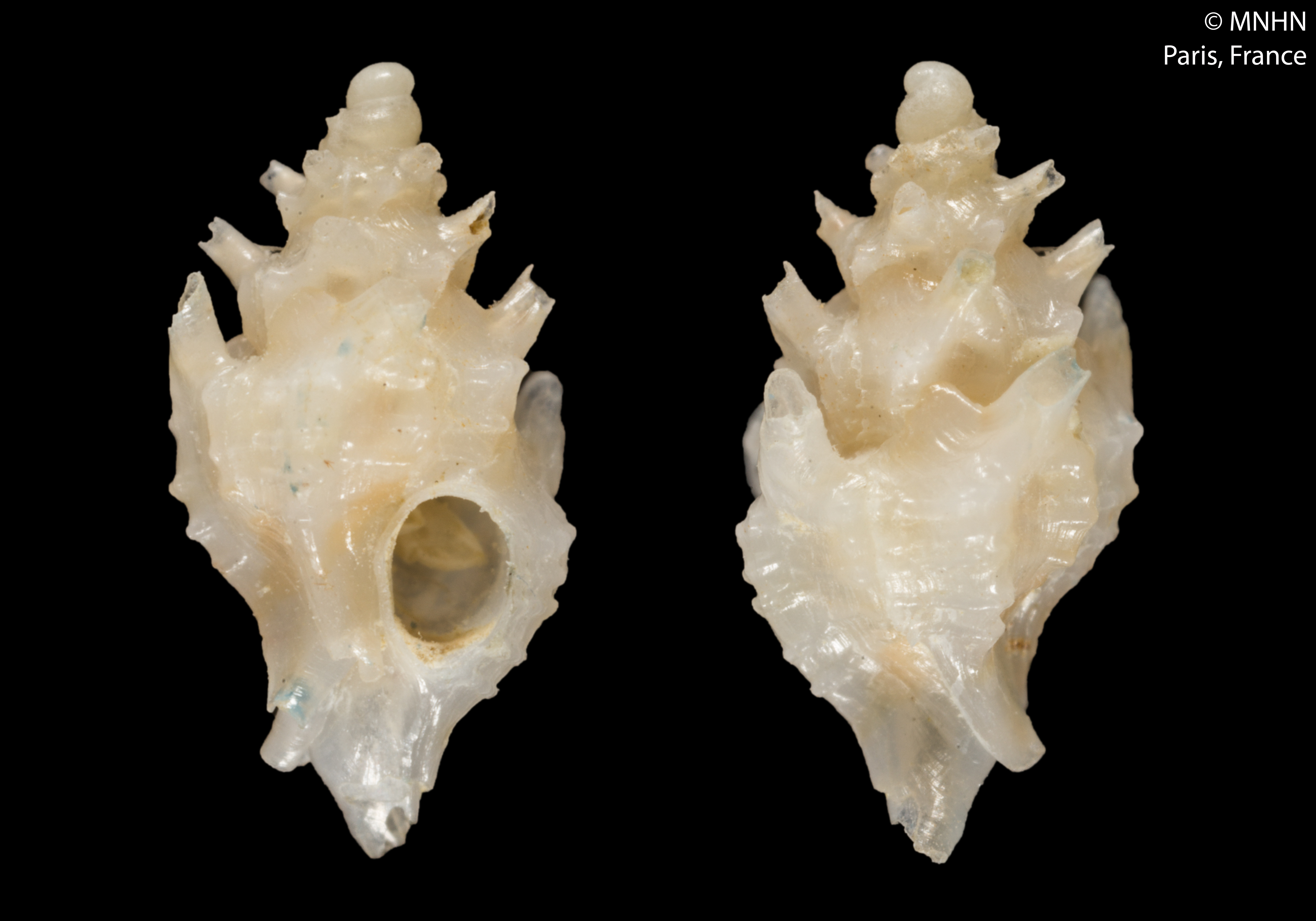
- Shell of Trubatsa undulata (holotype at MNHN, Paris)

Scientific classification
- Kingdom: Animalia
- Phylum: Mollusca
- Class: Gastropoda
- Subclass: Caenogastropoda
- Order: Neogastropoda
- Family: Muricidae
- Genus: Trubatsa
- Species: T. undulata

Binomial name
- Trubatsa undulata Houart, 1991

Synonyms
- Siphonochelus (Siphonochelus) undulatus Houart, 1991 · unaccepted (basionym); Siphonochelus (Trubatsa) undulatus Houart, 1991; Siphonochelus undulatus Houart, 1991

= Trubatsa undulata =

Species of gastropod

Trubatsa undulata is a species of sea snail, a marine gastropod mollusk in the family Muricidae, the murex snails or rock snails.

== Description ==
The length of the shell attains 5.5 mm.

== Distribution ==
This marine species occurs off New Caledonia.
