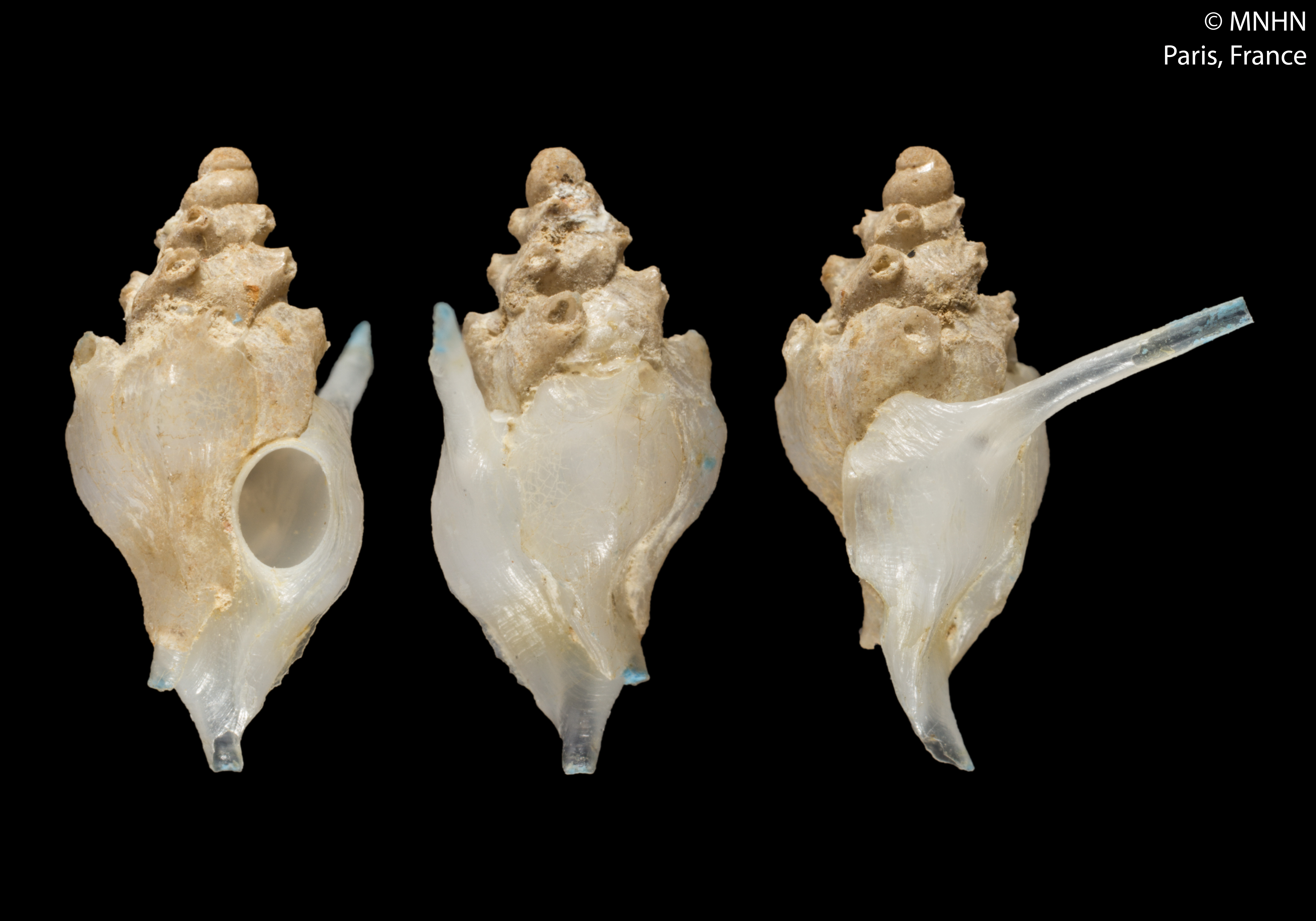
- Shell of Trubatsa unicornis (paratype at MNHN, Paris)

Scientific classification
- Kingdom: Animalia
- Phylum: Mollusca
- Class: Gastropoda
- Subclass: Caenogastropoda
- Order: Neogastropoda
- Family: Muricidae
- Genus: Trubatsa
- Species: T. unicornis

Binomial name
- Trubatsa unicornis Houart, 1991

Synonyms
- Siphonochelus (Siphonochelus) unicornis Houart, 1991 · unaccepted (basionym); Siphonochelus (Trubatsa) unicornis Houart, 1991; Siphonochelus unicornis Houart, 1991

= Trubatsa unicornis =

Species of gastropod

Trubatsa unicornis is a species of sea snail, a marine gastropod mollusk in the family Muricidae, the murex snails or rock snails.

== Distribution ==
This marine species occurs off New Caledonia.
