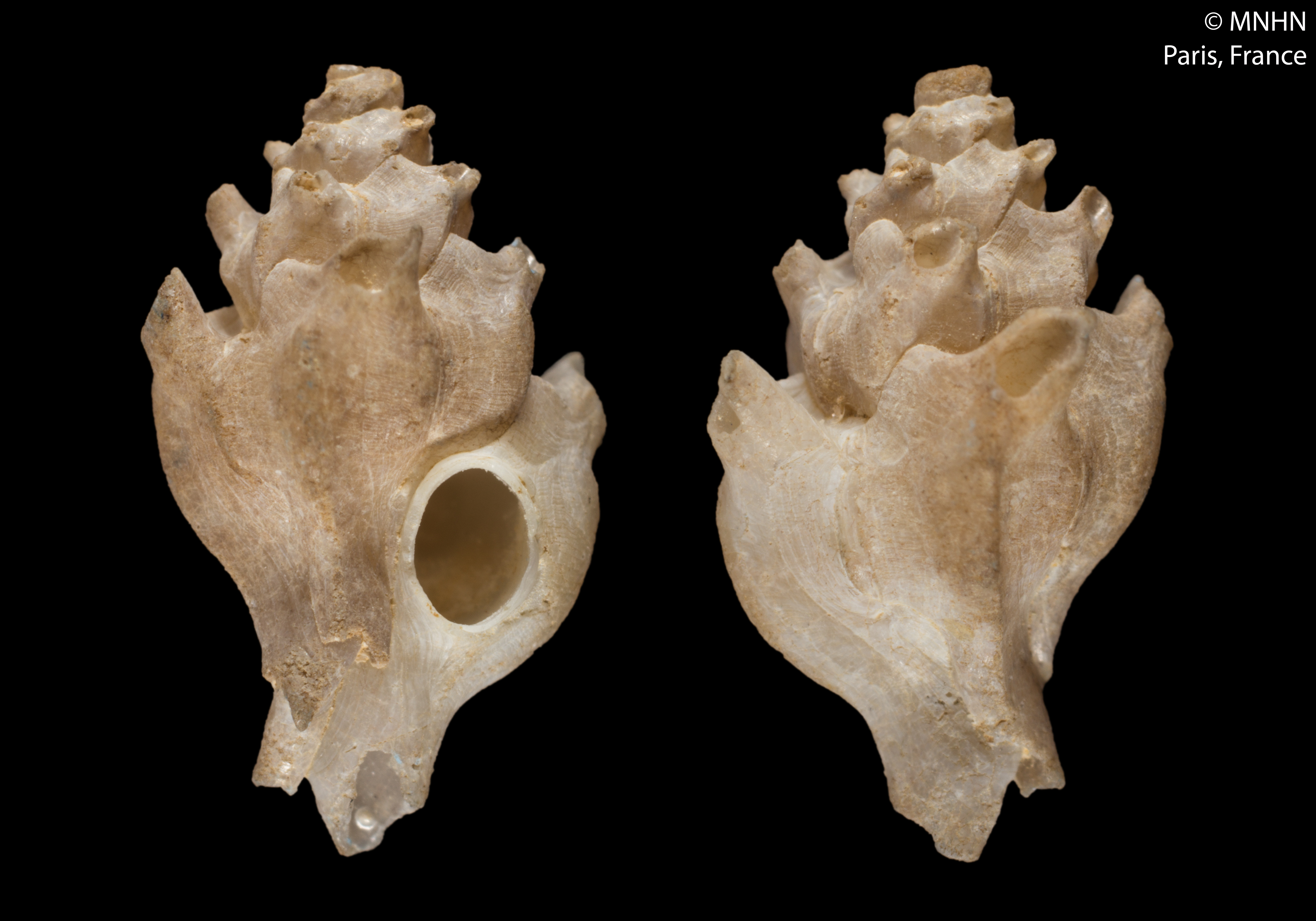
- Shell of Trubatsa lozoueti

Scientific classification
- Kingdom: Animalia
- Phylum: Mollusca
- Class: Gastropoda
- Subclass: Caenogastropoda
- Order: Neogastropoda
- Family: Muricidae
- Genus: Trubatsa
- Species: T. lozoueti

Binomial name
- Trubatsa lozoueti Houart, 1991

Synonyms
- Siphonochelus (Siphonochelus) lozoueti Houart, 1991 (basionym); Siphonochelus (Trubatsa) lozoueti Houart, 1991; Siphonochelus lozoueti Houart, 1991 (original combination)

= Trubatsa lozoueti =

Species of gastropod

Trubatsa lozoueti is a species of sea snail, a marine gastropod mollusk in the family Muricidae, the murex snails or rock snails.

== Distribution ==
This marine species occurs off New Caledonia.
