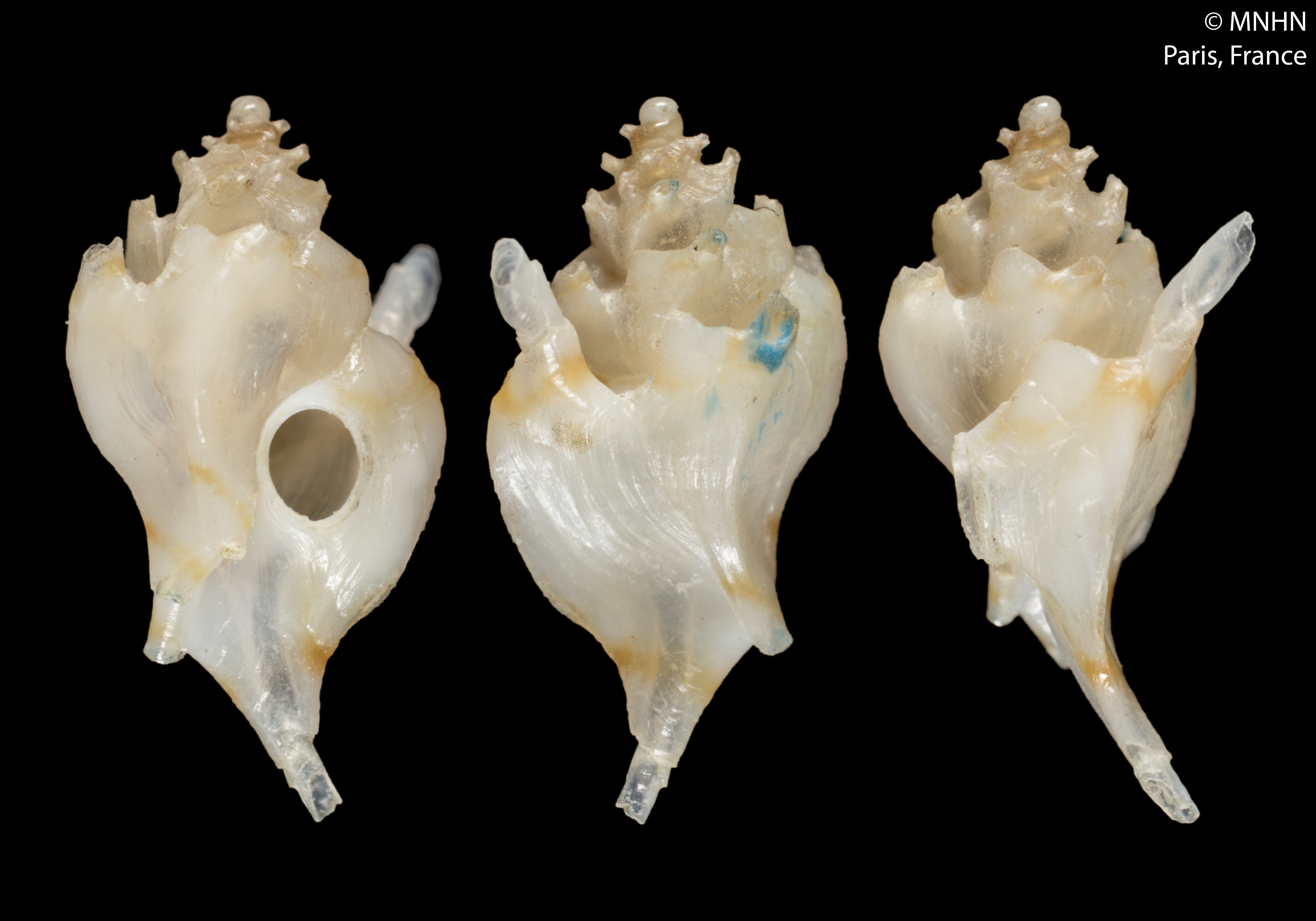
- Shell of Trubatsa saltantis (holotype at MNHN, Paris)

Scientific classification
- Kingdom: Animalia
- Phylum: Mollusca
- Class: Gastropoda
- Subclass: Caenogastropoda
- Order: Neogastropoda
- Family: Muricidae
- Genus: Trubatsa
- Species: T. saltantis

Binomial name
- Trubatsa saltantis Houart, 1991

Synonyms
- Siphonochelus (Siphonochelus) saltantis Houart, 1991 (basionym); Siphonochelus (Trubatsa) saltantis Houart, 1991 ·; Siphonochelus saltantis Houart, 1991

= Trubatsa saltantis =

Species of gastropod

Trubatsa saltantis is a species of sea snail, a marine gastropod mollusk in the family Muricidae, the murex snails or rock snails.

== Description ==
The length of the shell attains 9.2 mm.

== Distribution ==
This marine species occurs off the Lord Howe Seamount Chain, New Caledonia.
