= Trubatsa tityrus =

Scientific classification
- Kingdom: Animalia
- Phylum: Mollusca
- Class: Gastropoda
- Subclass: Caenogastropoda
- Order: Neogastropoda
- Family: Muricidae
- Genus: Trubatsa
- Species: T. tityrus

Binomial name
- Trubatsa tityrus (Bayer, 1971)

Synonyms
- Siphonochelus (Siphonochelus) tityrus (Bayer, 1971); Siphonochelus (Trubatsa) tityrus (Bayer, 1971); Siphonochelus tityrus (Bayer, 1971); Typhis (Siphonochelus) tityrus Bayer, 1971

Species of gastropod

Trubatsa tityrus is a species of sea snail, a marine gastropod mollusk in the family Muricidae, the murex snails or rock snails.

== Description ==
The size of an adult shell varies between 5 mm and 14 mm.

== Distribution ==
This species is found in the Caribbean Sea off Venezuela, Panama and Trinidad.
