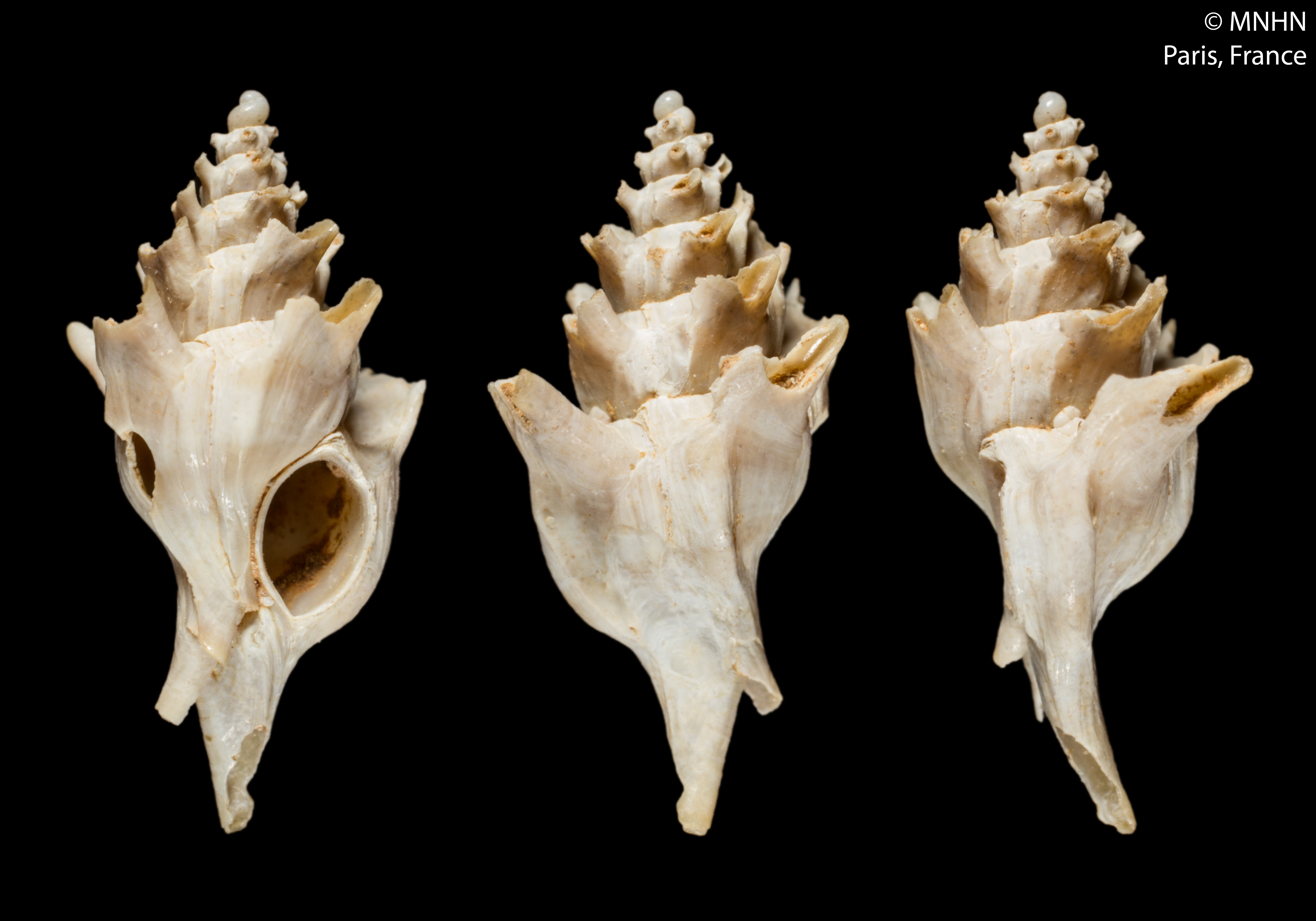
- Shell of Siphonochelus aethomorpha (holotype at MNHN, Paris)

Scientific classification
- Kingdom: Animalia
- Phylum: Mollusca
- Class: Gastropoda
- Subclass: Caenogastropoda
- Order: Neogastropoda
- Superfamily: Muricoidea
- Family: Muricidae
- Subfamily: Typhinae
- Genus: Trubatsa; Jousseaume, 1880

Type species
- Typhis longicornis Dall, 1888

Synonyms
- Siphonochelus (Trubatsa) Dall, 1889; Typhis (Trubatsa) Dall, 1889 (original rank)

= Trubatsa =

Genus of gastropods

Trubatsa is a genus of sea snails, marine gastropod mollusks in the family Muricidae, the murex snails or rock snails.

== Species ==
- Trubatsa alinkios Houart, Buge & Zuccon, 2021
- † Trubatsa aturensis (Magne, 1940)
- † Trubatsa calviniacensis Merle, Pacaud, Ledon & Goret, 2024
- † Trubatsa evainae (Merle, 1994)
- † Trubatsa gaasensis (Benoist, 1880)
- † Trubatsa ganensis Merle, Pacaud, Ledon & Goret, 2024
- † Trubatsa hortensis (Oppenheim, 1900)
- † Trubatsa intergymnus (Cossmann, 1919)
- † Trubatsa larratensis Lozouet, 2023
- Trubatsa longicornis (Dall, 1888)
- Trubatsa lozoueti (Houart, 1991)
- Trubatsa merlei Garrigues, 2023
- † Trubatsa parisiensis (d'Orbigny, 1850)
- Trubatsa patera Garrigues, 2021
- Trubatsa saltantis (Houart, 1991)
- † Trubatsa subaturensis Lozouet, 2023
- Trubatsa tityrus (Bayer, 1971)
- † Trubatsa trounensis Lozouet, 2023
- Trubatsa undulata (Houart, 1991)
- Trubatsa unicornis (Houart, 1991)
- Trubatsa virginiae (Houart, 1986)
- Trubatsa wolffi (Houart, 2013)
