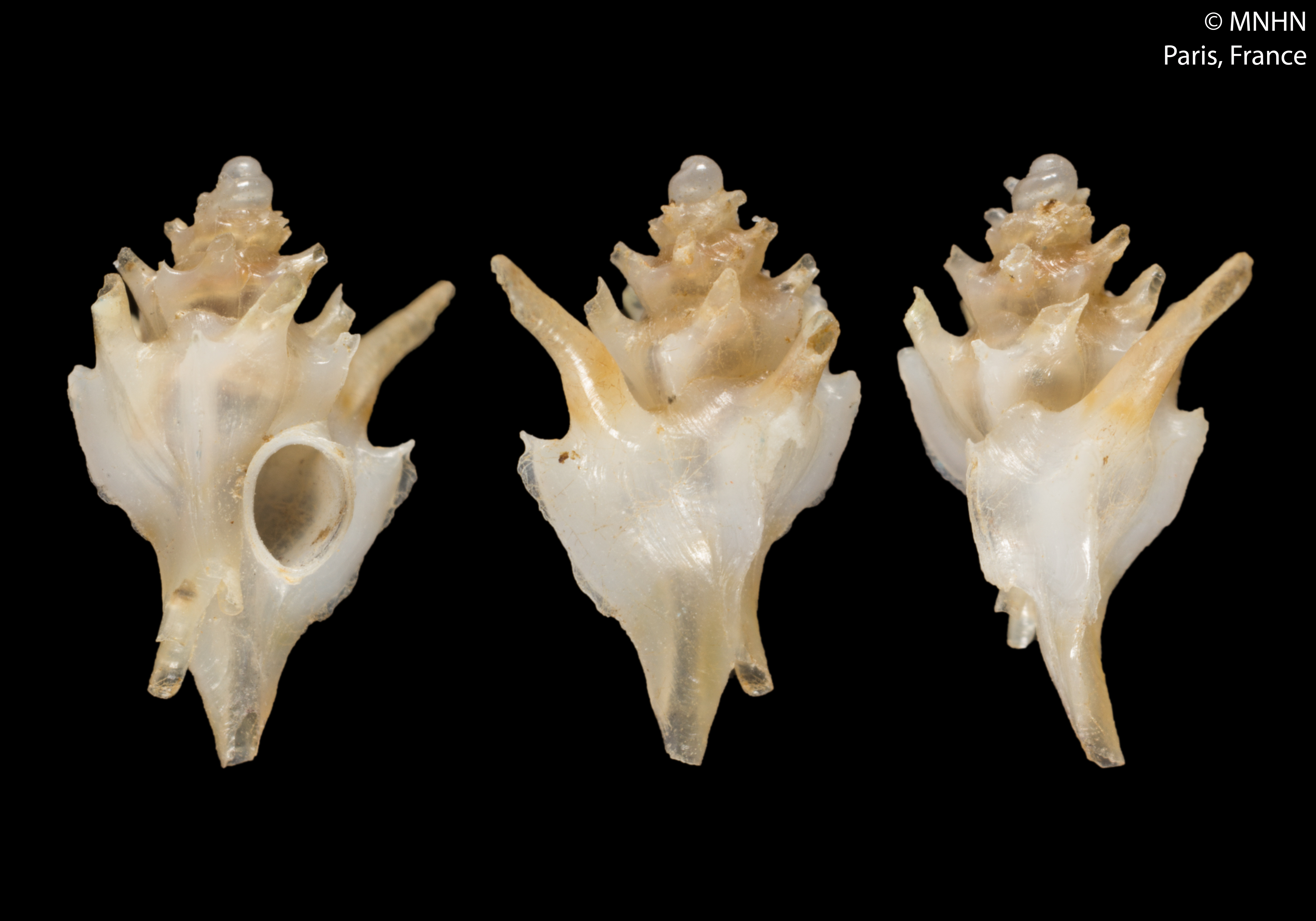
- Shell of Trubatsa virginiae

Scientific classification
- Kingdom: Animalia
- Phylum: Mollusca
- Class: Gastropoda
- Subclass: Caenogastropoda
- Order: Neogastropoda
- Family: Muricidae
- Genus: Trubatsa
- Species: T. virginiae

Binomial name
- Trubatsa virginiae (Houart, 1986)

Synonyms
- Siphonochelus (Siphonochelus) virginiae (Houart, 1986) · alternate representation; Siphonochelus virginiae (Houart, 1986); Typhis (Typhina) virginiae Houart, 1986 (basionym)

= Trubatsa virginiae =

Species of gastropod

Trubatsa virginiae is a species of sea snail, a marine gastropod mollusk in the family Muricidae, the murex snails or rock snails.

== Distribution ==
This marine species occurs off New Caledonia.
