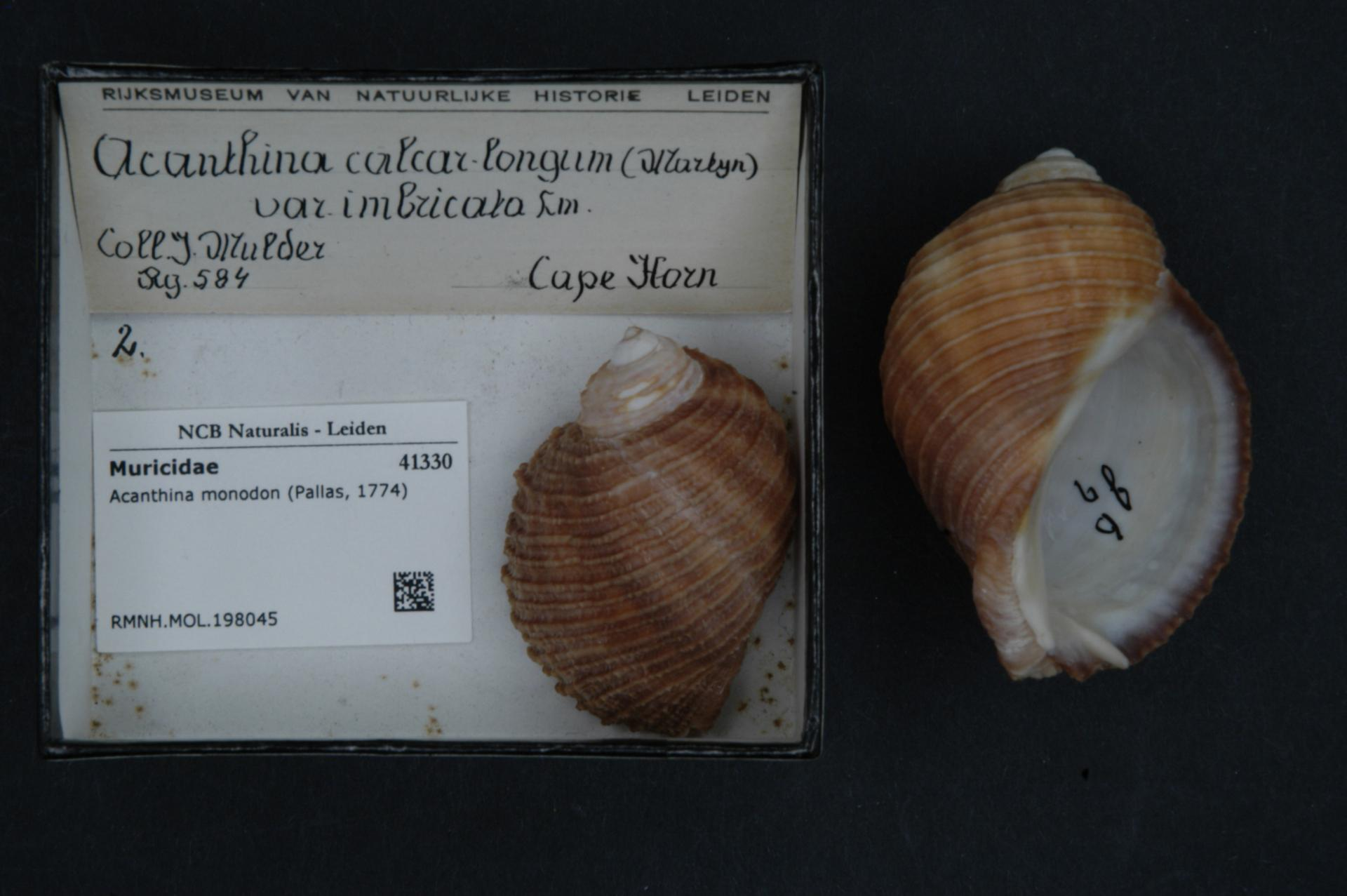
- Acanthina monodon shells

Scientific classification
- Kingdom: Animalia
- Phylum: Mollusca
- Class: Gastropoda
- Subclass: Caenogastropoda
- Order: Neogastropoda
- Superfamily: Muricoidea
- Family: Muricidae
- Subfamily: Ocenebrinae
- Genus: Acanthina; Fischer von Waldheim, 1807

Type species
- Buccinum monoceros Bruguière, 1789

Synonyms
- Acanthina (Acanthina) Fischer von Waldheim, 1807; Monoceros Lamarck, 1809 (Invalid: junior homonym of Monoceros Lacépède, 1798 [Pisces] and others); Nucella (Acanthina) Fischer von Waldheim, 1807 · unaccepted; Purpura (Monoceros) Lamarck, 1809; Rudolpha Schumacher, 1817; Unicornus Montfort, 1810

= Acanthina =

Genus of gastropods

Acanthina, common name the unicorn snails, is a genus of small predatory sea snails, marine gastropod mollusks in the family Muricidae, the murex snails or rock snails.

== Description ==
The shell is ovate. The body whorl is large. The spire is rather elevated. The aperture is semilunar. The inner lip is wide and flattened. The outer lip is crenated, with a prominent tooth at the fore part.

== Habitat ==
The species of Acanthina are most numerous on the South American coasts of the Pacific Ocean. These snails live in the intertidal zone.

== Species ==
Species within the genus Acanthina:

- † Acanthina katzi Fleming, 1972
- Acanthina monodon (Pallas, 1774)
- † Acanthina obesa DeVries, 2003
- † Acanthina rugosa DeVries, 2003
- † Acanthina triangularis DeVries, 2003
- Acanthina unicornis (Bruguière, 1789)

Species brought into synonymy

- Acanthina paucilirata now Acanthinucella paucilirata
- Acanthina punctulata now Acanthinucella punctulata
- Acanthina lugubris now Mexacanthina lugubris
- Acanthina spirata now Acanthinucella spirata
- Acanthina angelica Oldroyd, 1918 : synonym of Mexacanthina angelica (Oldroyd, 1918)
- Acanthina costata Fischer, 1807 : synonym of Acanthina monodon (Pallas, 1774)
- Acanthina imbricata Fischer, 1807 : synonym of Acanthina monodon (Pallas, 1774)
- Acanthina laevigata Fischer, 1807 : synonym of Acanthina monodon (Pallas, 1774)
- Acanthina tyrianthina Berry, 1957 : synonym of Mexacanthina lugubris (Sowerby, 1821)
