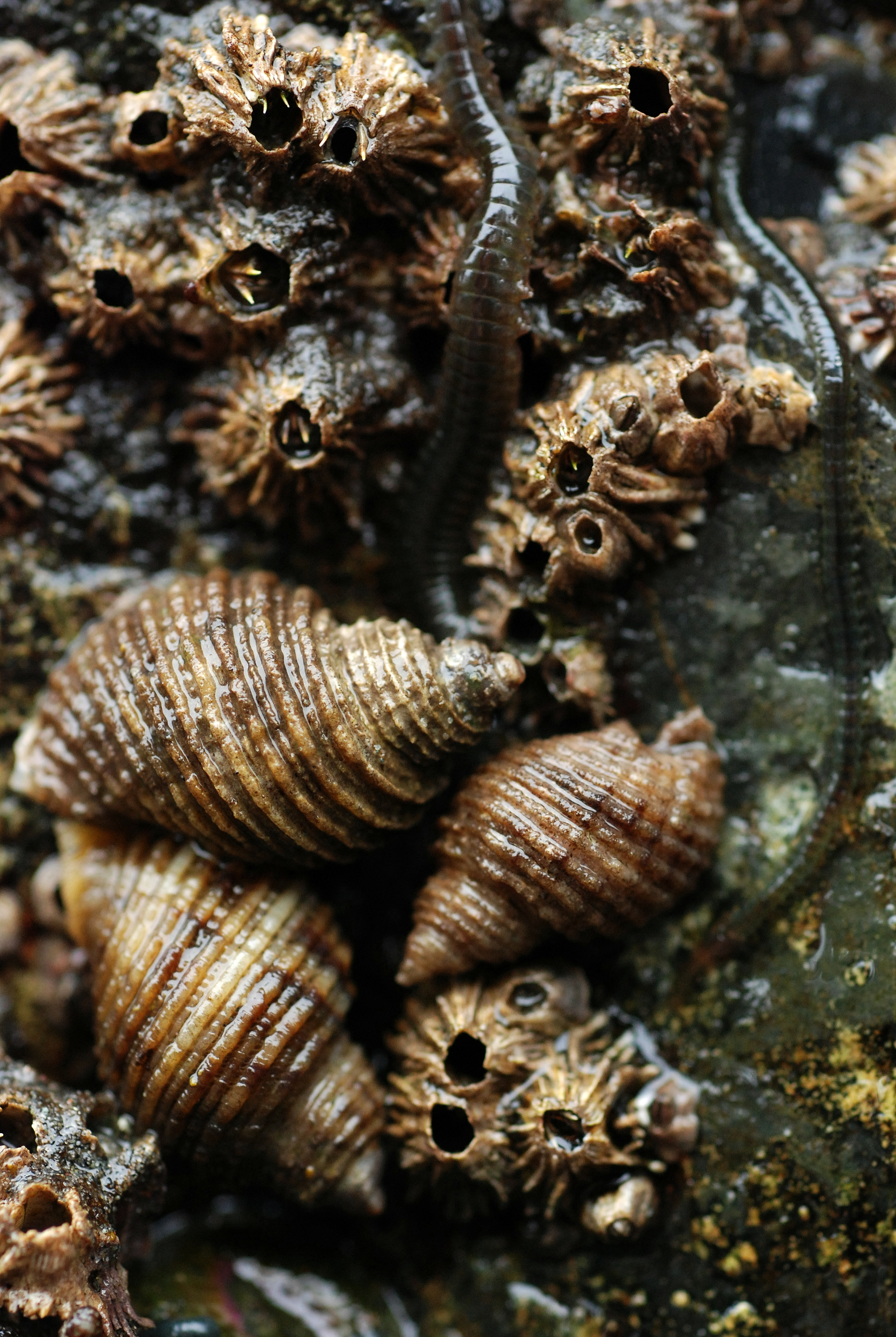
- N. canaliculata surrounded by thatched barnacles (Semibalanus cariosus), and pile worms (Nereis vexillosa)

Scientific classification
- Kingdom: Animalia
- Phylum: Mollusca
- Class: Gastropoda
- Subclass: Caenogastropoda
- Order: Neogastropoda
- Family: Muricidae
- Genus: Nucella
- Species: N. canaliculata

Binomial name
- Nucella canaliculata (Duclos, 1832)

Synonyms
- Purpura canaliculata Duclos, 1832; Purpura decemcostata Middendorff, 1849; Thais canaliculata var. compressa Dall, 1915

= Nucella canaliculata =

Species of gastropod

Nucella canaliculata, commonly known as the channeled dog winkle or the channeled purple, is a species of sea snail, a marine gastropod mollusk in the family Muricidae, the murex snails or rock snails. The shell grows to a maximum length of about 4 cm (1.6 in). This species is distributed in the northeastern Pacific Ocean from the Aleutian Islands to California.

== Description ==
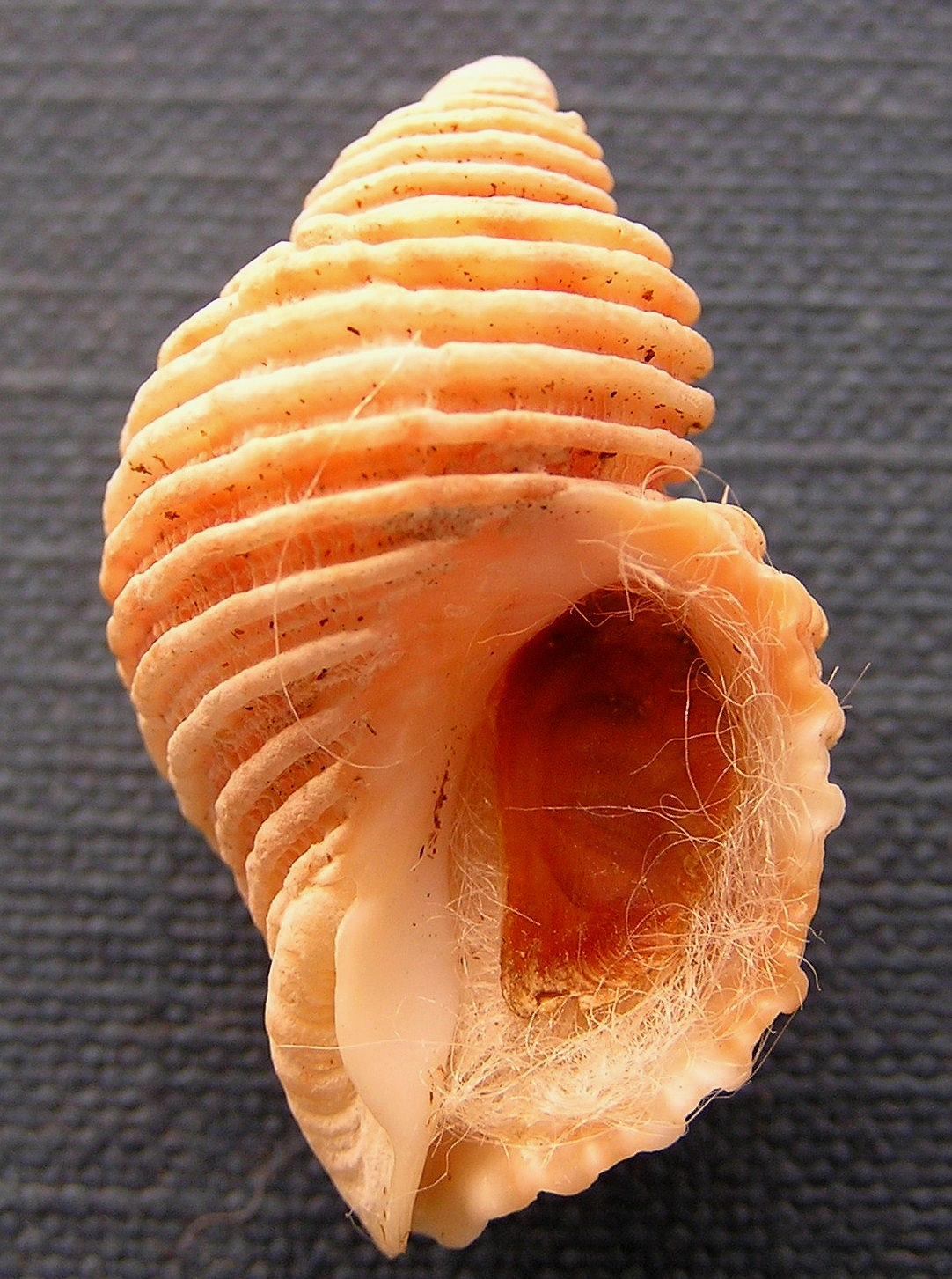
Apertural view of N. caniculata

Nucella canaliculata has a robust shell with a strong spire, a short notch to house the siphon, and up to seven whorls. The whorls are demarcated from each other by deep grooves and are sculpted with many low spiral ridges of approximately even size. The surface of the shell is matt; small individuals are often orange while larger ones are grayish or pale brown. The margins of the aperture are often yellow, and the animal's soft parts are protected by a horny operculum. The maximum length of this species is about 4 cm (1.6 in). This dog winkle can be distinguished from the frilled dog winkle (Nucella lamellosa) by the absence of frilled decoration, and from the northern striped dog winkle (Nucella ostrina) by the evenness of the size of the sculpted ridges.

== Distribution ==
This dog winkle is native to the Pacific coasts of North America. Its range extends from the Aleutian Islands off Alaska to San Luis Obispo County, California, but it is uncommon to the north of Puget Sound or to the south of San Francisco Bay. It is found on both exposed and sheltered rocks in the intertidal zone and is particularly common in wave-exposed areas of the Olympic Peninsula and near mussel beds.

== Ecology ==
N. canaliculata is a predator and feeds on mussels and barnacles by drilling a hole through the shell. Researchers found that the dog winkle was more successful at drilling into the barnacle Semibalanus cariosus when it drills between the lateral plates rather than through them. A toxin is then injected through the hole which causes the barnacle's muscles to relax and the opercular valves to gape, whereupon the dog winkle can easily consume the soft tissues.
