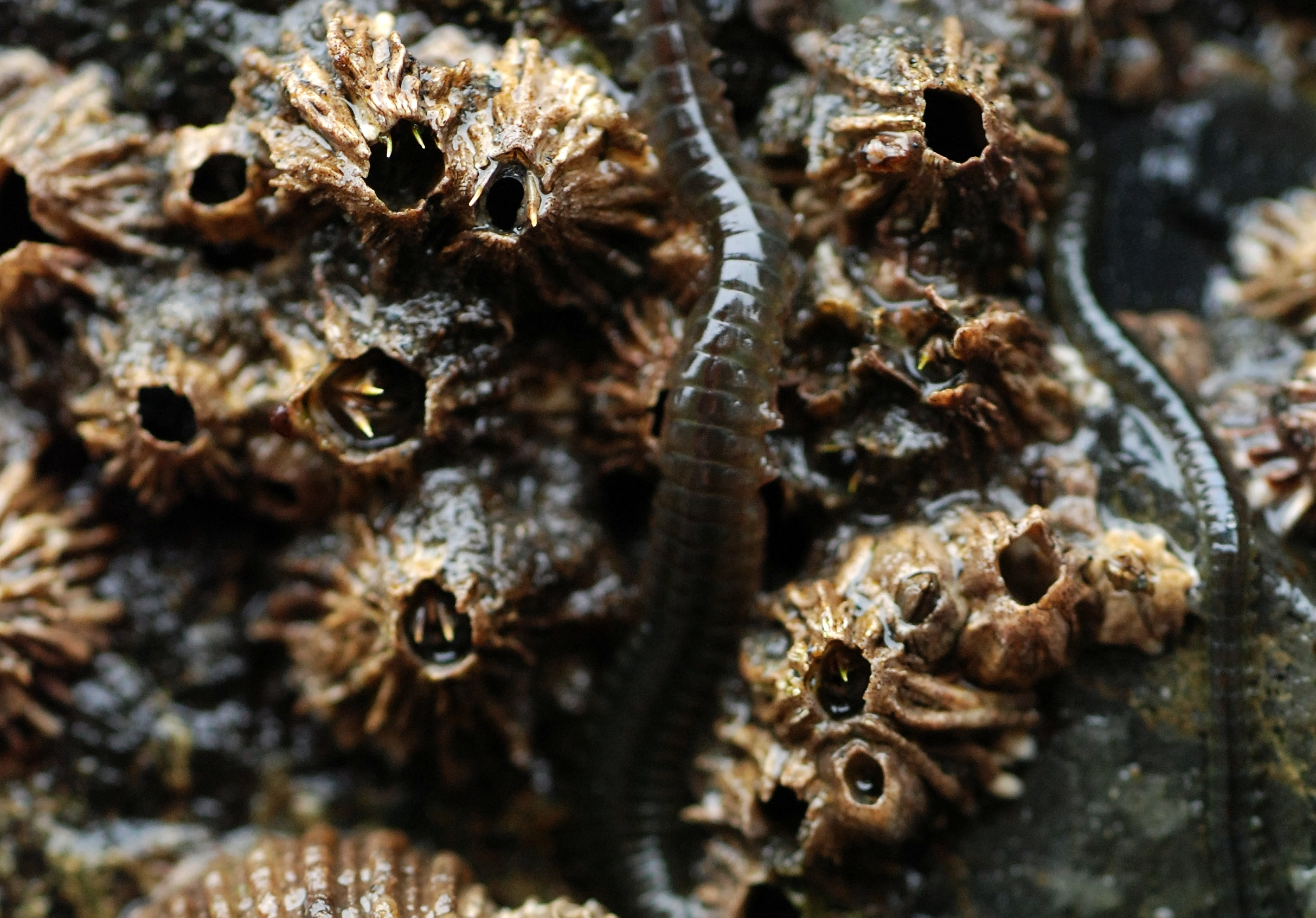
- S. cariosus with pile worms (Nereis vexillosa)

Scientific classification
- Kingdom: Animalia
- Phylum: Arthropoda
- Clade: Pancrustacea
- Class: Thecostraca
- Subclass: Cirripedia
- Order: Balanomorpha
- Family: Balanidae
- Genus: Semibalanus
- Species: S. cariosus

Binomial name
- Semibalanus cariosus (Pallas, 1788)

= Semibalanus cariosus =

Species of barnacle

Semibalanus cariosus, commonly known as the thatched barnacle, rock barnacle or horse barnacle, is a species of acorn barnacle occurring in the northern Pacific Ocean.

== Description ==
This barnacle has six wall plates which are sculpted with vertical tube-like ribs which extend downwards onto the rock in projections rather like the edge of a thatched roof. The rostrum overlaps the wall plates and the terga form a beak when the barnacle is closed. There is a sinuous line at the junction between the tergum and the scutum. This is a large species of barnacle and can grow to a diameter of 6 cm (2.4 in), but when densely packed together, individuals may be much taller than they are wide. The wall plates are white, greenish, brownish or gray. The base of the barnacle is little calcified so that when it is broken from the rock, a membrane and some soft tissues may be left behind.

== Distribution and habitat ==
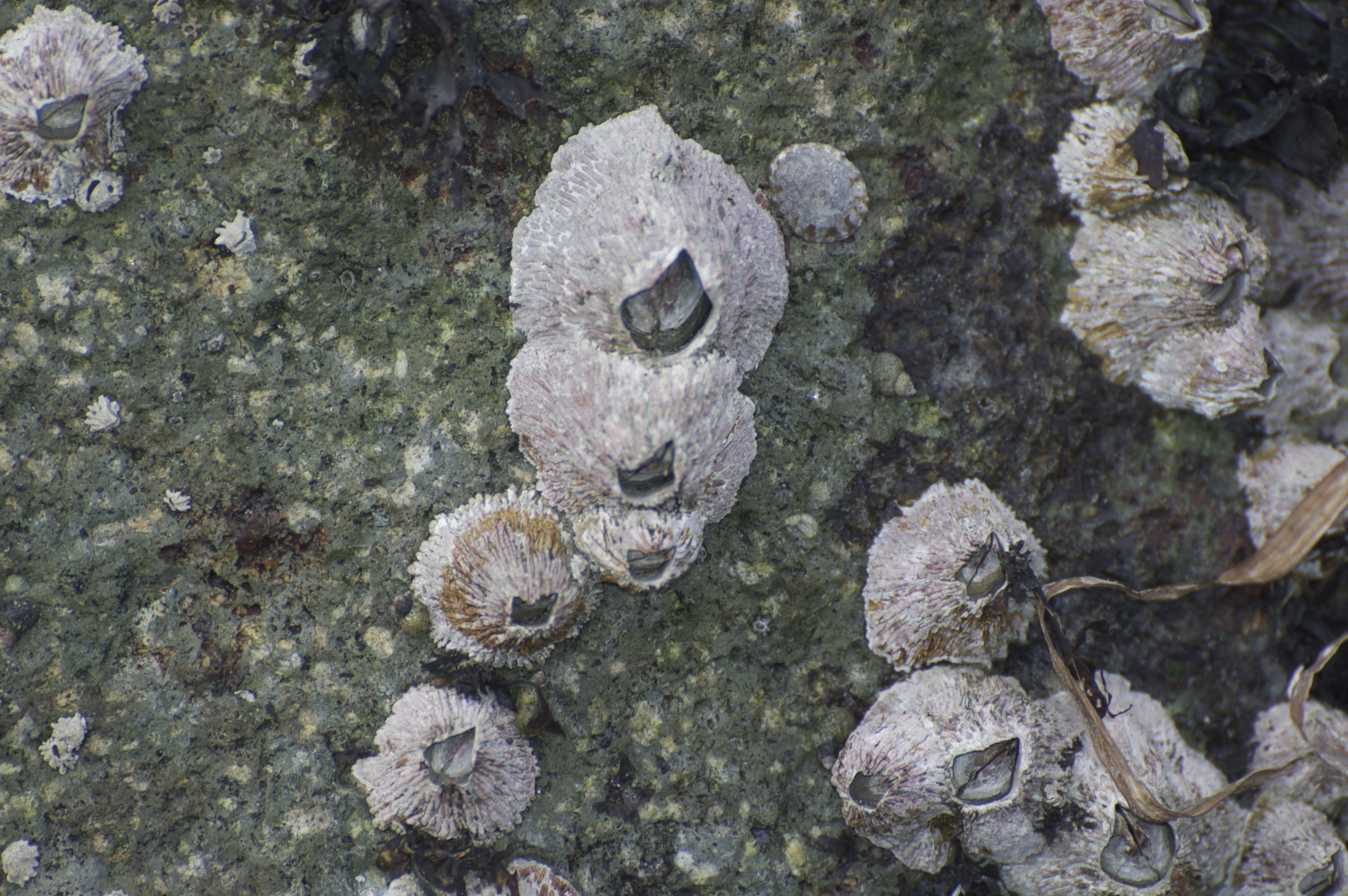
Thatched barnacles

Semibalanus cariosus is native to the northern Pacific Ocean including Japan and the Pacific Northwest coast of North America, where its range extends from the Bering Sea to Morro Bay, California. It is found on rocks, pilings and other man-made structures from the mid-intertidal zone down to the shallow subtidal zone. In general, it occupies a belt below the zone occupied by Balanus glandula, often near beds of the California mussel (Mytilus californianus) and the bay mussel (Mytilus trossulus); it may be very numerous and is often the commonest organism in this belt.

== Ecology ==
Like other acorn barnacles, S. cariosus is a filter feeder; when it is under water, the moveable terga at the apex part, and the cirri are extended to feed. When above water, the terga shut tightly for protection and to prevent desiccation. Small barnacles are sometimes "bulldozed" off the rock by the limpet Lottia digitalis while it is grazing. Predatory gastropod mollusks, such as the channeled dog winkle (Nucella canaliculata), drill into the barnacle shell and then inject a toxin which causes the muscles to relax, enabling the winkle to consume the soft parts. The winkles were more successful at gaining entry if they drilled between the wall plates of the barnacle rather than through them. Larger barnacles may be too big for the frilled dogwinkle (Nucella lamellosa), the purple seastar (Pisaster ochraceus) or the sunflower sea star (Pycnopodia helianthoides) to tackle.

== Human use ==
Native Americans such as the Quinault people of Washington State used barnacles as a food resource, the staples of the diet in spring and summer being "clams, oysters, mussels, barnacles, roots, berries and fish". The shells of Semibalanus cariosus are found in their middens.
