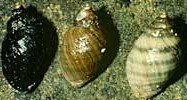
- Three color varieties of Nucella emarginata

Scientific classification
- Kingdom: Animalia
- Phylum: Mollusca
- Class: Gastropoda
- Subclass: Caenogastropoda
- Order: Neogastropoda
- Superfamily: Muricoidea
- Family: Muricidae
- Subfamily: Ocenebrinae
- Genus: Nucella; Roding, 1798

Type species
- Buccinum filosum Gmelin, 1791

Species
- See text

Synonyms
- Nucella (Nucella) Röding, 1798 superseded combination; Nucella (Polytropa) Swainson, 1840 junior subjective synonym; Polytropa Swainson, 1840; Polytropalicus Rovereto, 1899; Purpura (Polytropa) Swainson, 1840; Thais (Nucella) Röding, 1798 superseded combination; Thais (Polytropa) Swainson, 1840 superseded combination

= Nucella =

Genus of gastropods

Nucella, common name dog whelks or dog winkles, is a genus of small to medium-sized predatory sea snails, marine gastropod mollusks in the subfamily Ocenebrinae which is part of the large family Muricidae, the murex snails or rock snails.

== Description ==
(Described as Polytropa) The spire is acuminate. The whorls are foliated or tuberculose. The inner lip is flattened. The siphonal canal is small and oblique. The aperture is narrowed at the forepart.

== Species ==
Species in the genus Nucella include:

- Nucella angustior Houart, Vermeij & Wiedrick, 2019
- † Nucella bermejensis Lozano-Francisco & Vera-Peláez, 2006
- Nucella canaliculata (Duclos, 1832) - channeled dogwinkle
- Nucella dubia (Krauss, 1848) - common dogwhelk
- Nucella emarginata (Deshayes, 1839) - emarginate dogwinkle
- Nucella freycinetii (Deshayes, 1839)
- Nucella heyseana (Dunker, 1882)
- Nucella lamellosa (Gmelin, 1791) - frilled dogwinkle
- Nucella lapillus (Linnaeus, 1758) - Atlantic dogwinkle, dog whelk
- Nucella lima (Gmelin, 1791) - file dogwinkle
- Nucella ostrina (Gould, 1852) - striped dogwinkle
- Nucella rolani (Bogi & Nofroni, 1984)
- Nucella squamosa (Lamarck, 1816) - scaly dogwhelk
- Nucella wahlbergi (Krauss, 1848)

Species brought into synonymy

- Nucella acuminata Carcelles, 1954 accepted as Acanthina unicornis (Bruguière, 1789)
- Nucella analoga (Forbes, 1852): synonym of Nucella canaliculata Duclos, 1832
- Nucella castanea (Küster, 1886): synonym of Orania castanea (Küster, 1886)
- Nucella cingulata (Linnaeus, 1771): synonym of Trochia cingulata (Linnaeus, 1771)
- Nucella elongata Golikov & Kussakin, 1962: synonym of Nucella freycinetii (Deshayes, 1839)
- Nucella fuscata (Forbes, 1850): synonym of Nucella emarginata (Deshayes, 1839)
- Nucella heyseana var. elongata Golikov & Kussakin, 1962: synonym of Nucella heyseana (Dunker, 1882)
- Nucella lindaniae Lorenz, 1991: synonym of Nucella wahlbergi (Krauss, 1848)
- Nucella pyramidalis (Turton, 1932): synonym of Nucella dubia (Krauss, 1848)
- Nucella theobroma Roding, 1798: synonym of Nucella lapillus (Linnaeus, 1758)
