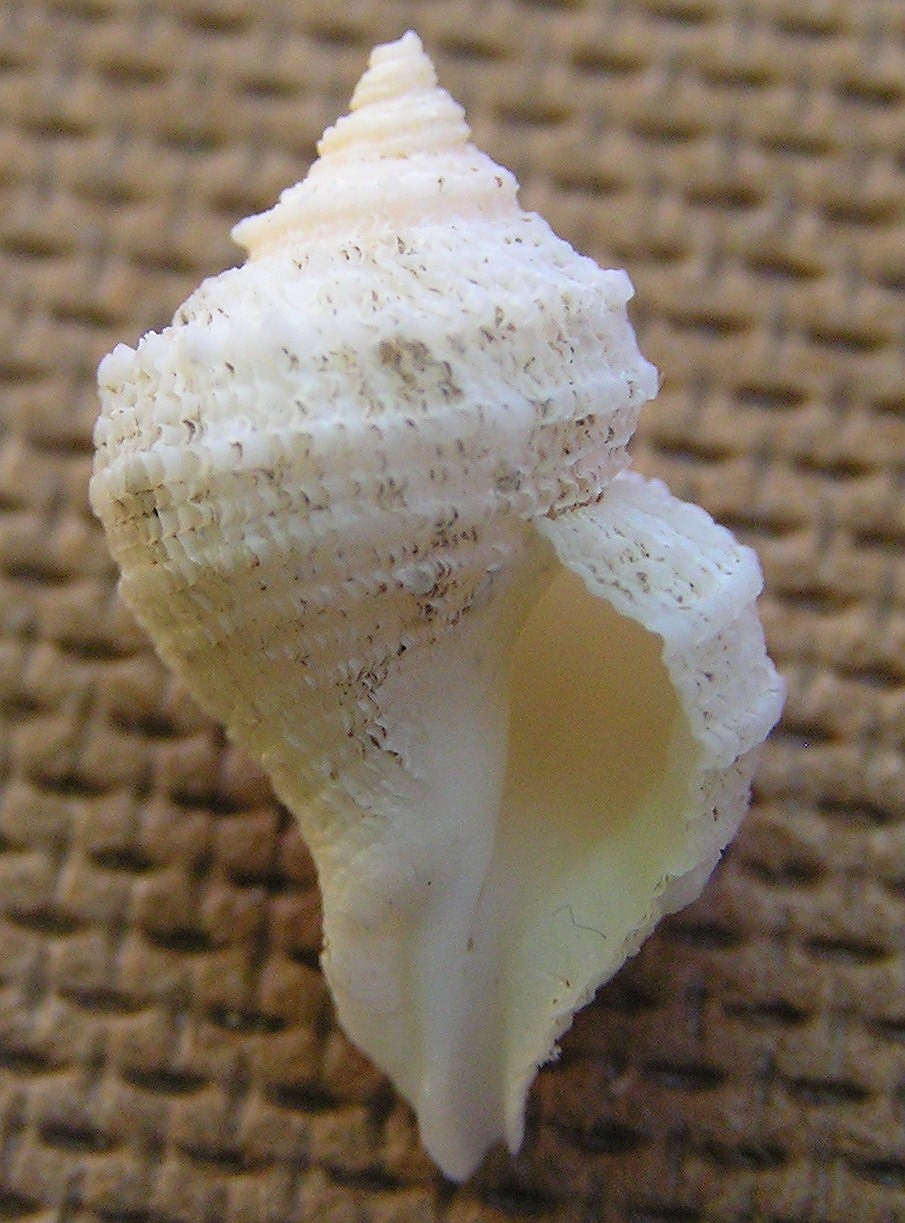
- Nucella rolani

Scientific classification
- Kingdom: Animalia
- Phylum: Mollusca
- Class: Gastropoda
- Subclass: Caenogastropoda
- Order: Neogastropoda
- Family: Muricidae
- Genus: Nucella
- Species: N. rolani

Binomial name
- Nucella rolani (Bogi & Nofroni, 1984)

Synonyms
- Coralliophila rolani Bogi & Nofroni, 1984

= Nucella rolani =

Species of gastropod

Nucella rolani is a species of sea snail, a marine gastropod mollusk in the family Muricidae, the murex snails or rock snails. N. rolani is believed to be a close relative or morphological variant of the other east Atlantic member of its genus, Nucella lapillus.

== Description ==
Nucella sp. has been noted to have high levels of intraspecies variation in shell appearance, which historically has resulted in potentially genetically similar populations being "split" rather than "lumped" in taxonomy. The shell size is up to 24 mm.

== Distribution ==
This species is distributed in the Atlantic Ocean along Portugal and Northwest Spain.
