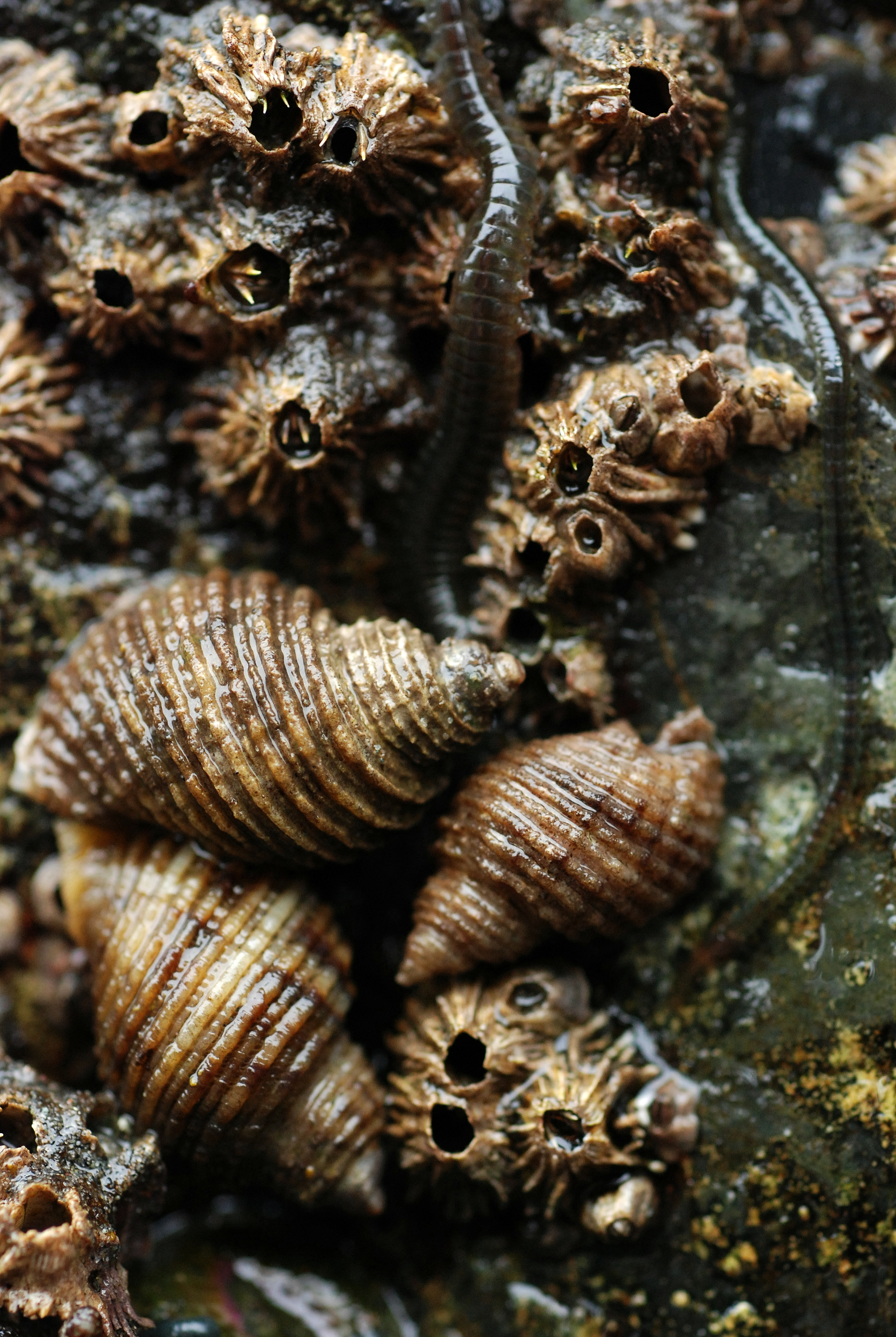
- Semibalanus cariosus

Scientific classification
- Kingdom: Animalia
- Phylum: Arthropoda
- Class: Thecostraca
- Subclass: Cirripedia
- Order: Balanomorpha
- Family: Balanidae
- Subfamily: Semibalaninae
- Genus: Semibalanus; Pilsbry, 1916

Type species
- Semibalanus balanoides Linnaeus, 1767

= Semibalanus =

Genus of barnacles

Semibalanus is a genus of barnacles, comprising four species. It is the only genus in the subfamily Semibalaninae.

== Species ==
These species belong to the genus Semibalanus:

- Semibalanus balanoides (Linnaeus, 1767) (northern acorn barnacle)
- Semibalanus cariosus (Pallas, 1788) (thatched barnacle)
- Semibalanus madrasensis (Daniel, 1958)
- Semibalanus sinnurensis (Daniel, 1962)
