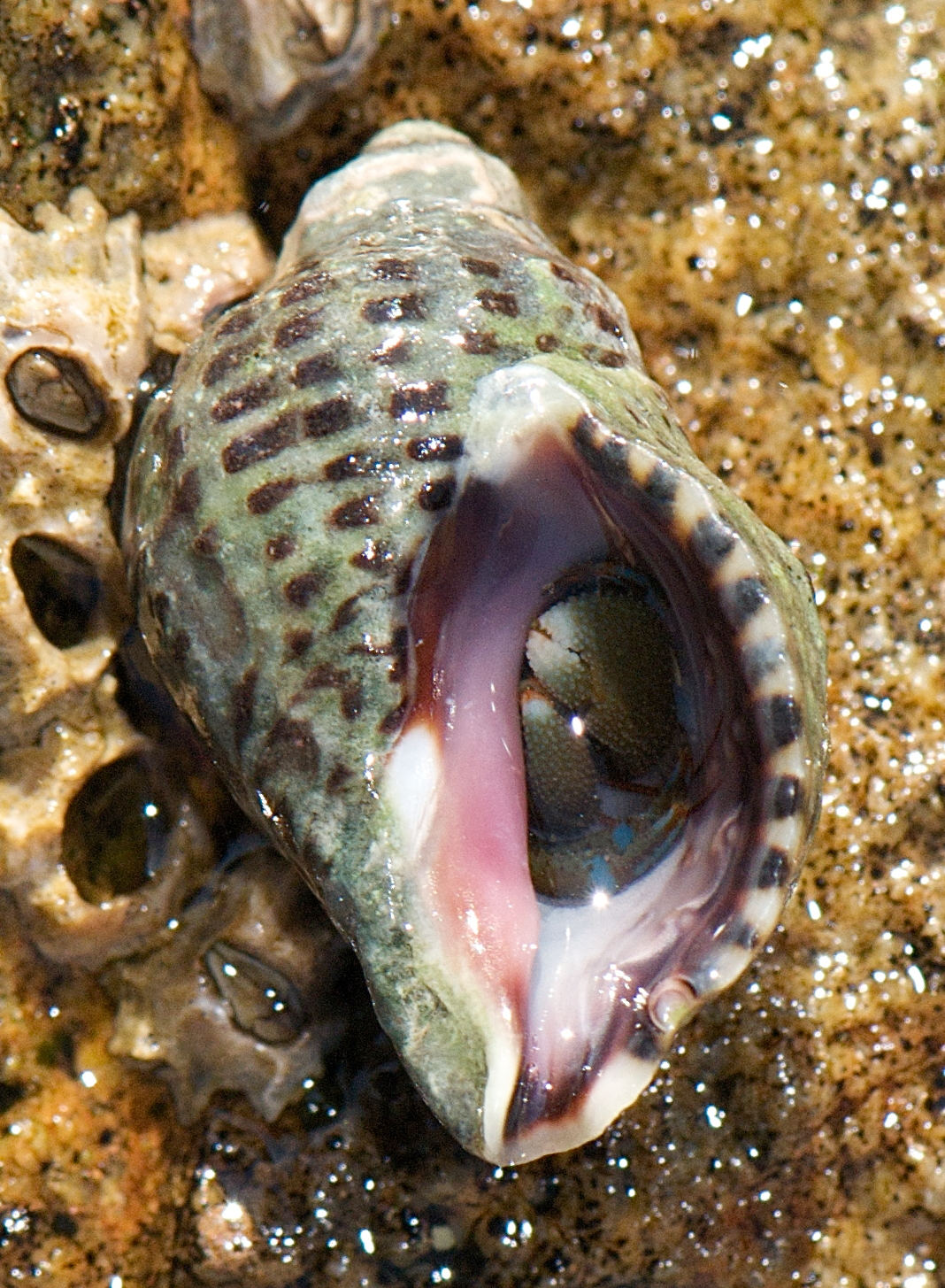
- A hermit-crabbed shell of Acanthinucella punctulata

Scientific classification
- Kingdom: Animalia
- Phylum: Mollusca
- Class: Gastropoda
- Subclass: Caenogastropoda
- Order: Neogastropoda
- Family: Muricidae
- Subfamily: Ocenebrinae
- Genus: Acanthinucella; Cooke, 1918

= Acanthinucella =

Genus of gastropods

Acanthinucella is a genus of sea snails, marine gastropod mollusks in the family Muricidae, the murex snails or rock snails.

== Species ==
Species within the genus Acanthinucella include:

Image	Scientific name	Distribution
	Acanthinucella paucilirata (Stearns, 1871)	Mexico
	Acanthinucella punctulata (Sowerby, 1835)	West Coast of North America, from Monterey, California, to northern Baja California, Mexico.
	Acanthinucella spirata (Blainville, 1832)	West Coast aka the Pacific Ocean coast of North America.
