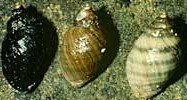

Scientific classification
- Kingdom: Animalia
- Phylum: Mollusca
- Class: Gastropoda
- Subclass: Caenogastropoda
- Order: Neogastropoda
- Family: Muricidae
- Genus: Nucella
- Species: N. emarginata

Binomial name
- Nucella emarginata (Deshayes, 1839)

Synonyms
- Purpura emarginata Deshayes, 1839; Thais emarginata (Deshayes, 1839)

= Nucella emarginata =

Species of gastropod

Nucella emarginata, commonly named the emarginate dogwinkle, is a species of medium-sized predatory sea snail, a marine gastropod mollusk in the family Muricidae, the murex snails or rock snails.

== Description ==
N. emarginata is a rocky intertidal gastropod carnivore that feeds on a variety of sessile and sedentary species such as barnacles, mussels, and limpets. The adult shell size of this species can reach 25 mm or 30 mm.

== Feeding ==
N. emarginata attacks prey by drilling. It has a special organ called the accessory boring organ, or ABO, that contains acid which it uses to dissolve a small hole in the shell of its prey. When drilling, it alternates acid secretions with scraping by its radula until it has fully penetrated the prey's shell, leaving a characteristic hole about 1 mm in diameter. The speed of this process likely depends on temperature, and the size of the hole depends on the size of the dogwhelk's accessory boring organ, which is generally larger in larger dogwhelks. Finally, when the hole is complete, the dogwhelk inserts its proboscis into the hole to feed.

== Distribution ==
This species lives in mid-intertidal zones and often lives among mussels such as Mytilus californianus. Formerly known as N. ostrina, the two species were differentiated based on shell morphology, reproductive compatibility, and genetic sequencing in 1990. N. emarginata is now known to be distributed between Fort Point, California and Pacific Mexico.
