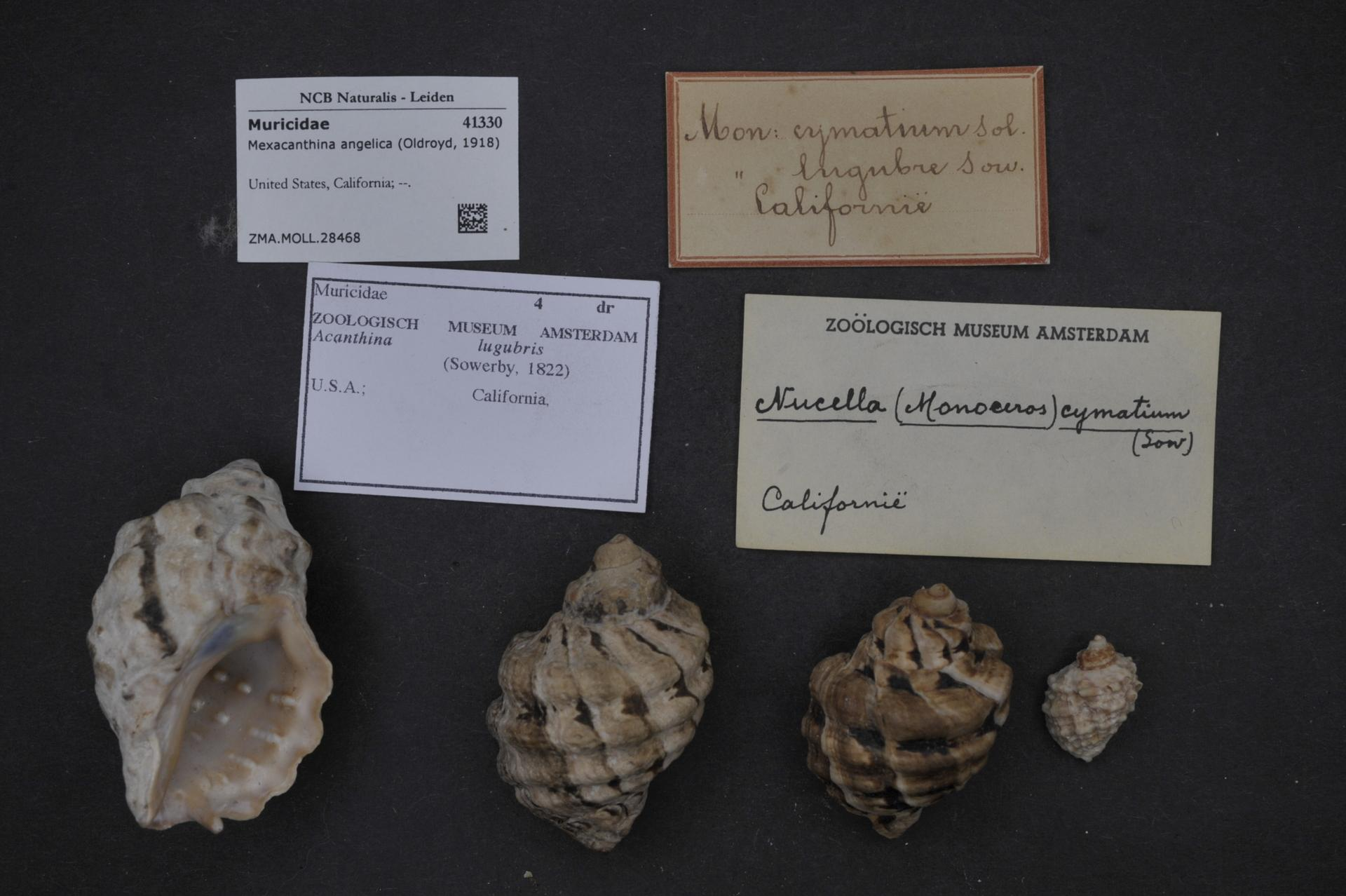
- Mexacanthina angelica

Scientific classification
- Kingdom: Animalia
- Phylum: Mollusca
- Class: Gastropoda
- Subclass: Caenogastropoda
- Order: Neogastropoda
- Family: Muricidae
- Subfamily: Ocenebrinae
- Genus: Mexacanthina; Marko & Vermeij, 1999

= Mexacanthina =

Genus of gastropods

Mexacanthina is a genus of sea snails, marine gastropod molluscs in the family Muricidae, the murex snails or rock snails.

== Species ==
Species within the genus Mexacanthina include:

- Mexacanthina angelica (Oldroyd, 1918)
- Mexacanthina lugubris (Sowerby, 1821)
