= Nucella fuscata =

Scientific classification
- Kingdom: Animalia
- Phylum: Mollusca
- Class: Gastropoda
- Subclass: Caenogastropoda
- Order: Neogastropoda
- Family: Muricidae
- Genus: Nucella
- Species: N. fuscata

Binomial name
- Nucella fuscata (Forbes, 1850)

Synonyms
- Purpura fuscata Forbes, 1850

Species of gastropod

Nucella fuscata is a species of sea snail, a marine gastropod mollusk in the family Muricidae, the murex snails or rock snails.
