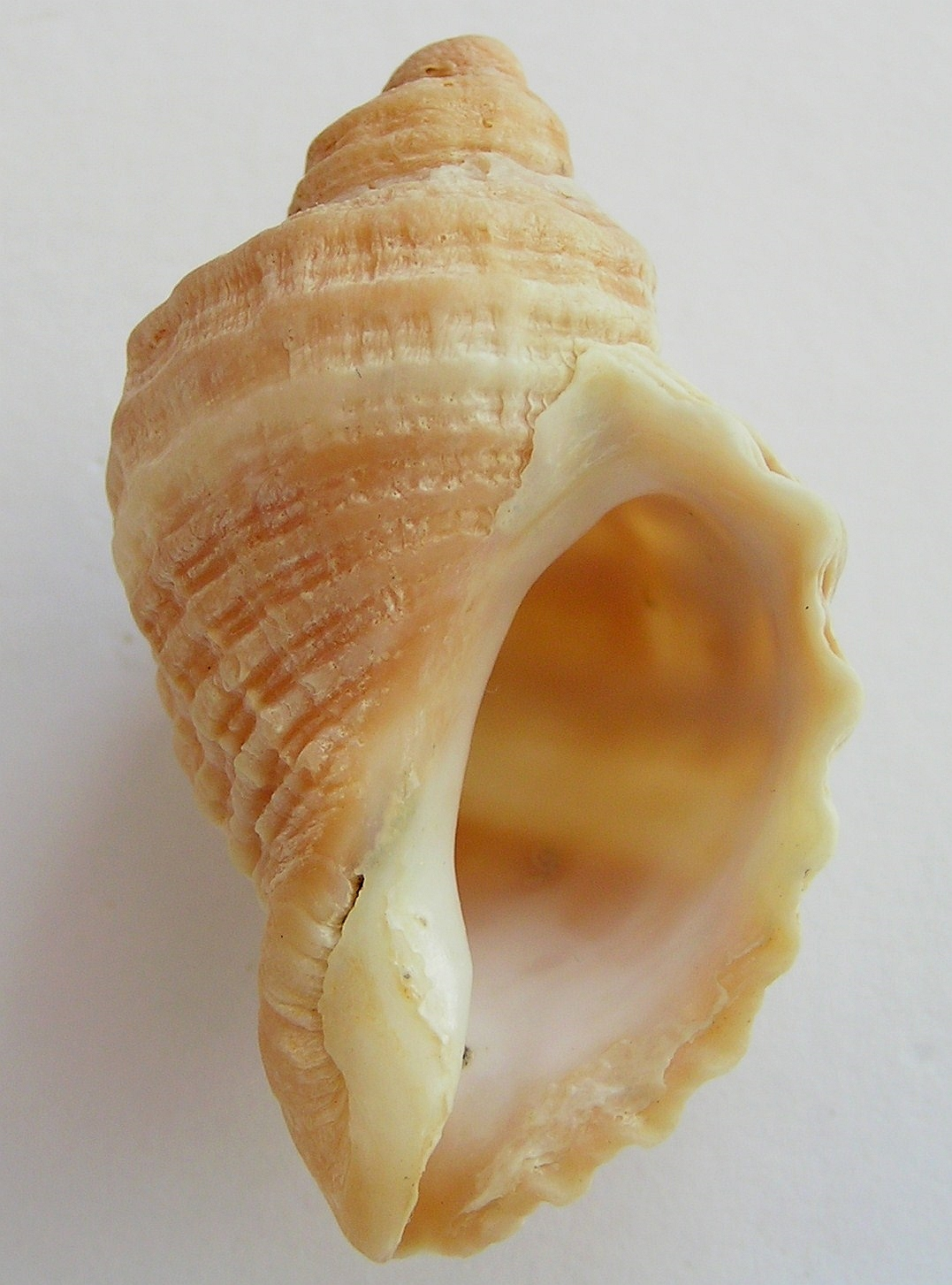

Scientific classification
- Kingdom: Animalia
- Phylum: Mollusca
- Class: Gastropoda
- Subclass: Caenogastropoda
- Order: Neogastropoda
- Family: Muricidae
- Genus: Nucella
- Species: N. heyseana

Binomial name
- Nucella heyseana (Dunker, 1882)

Synonyms
- Purpura heyseana Dunker, 1882

= Nucella heyseana =

Species of gastropod

Nucella heyseana is a species of sea snail, a marine gastropod mollusk in the family Muricidae, the murex snails or rock snails.
