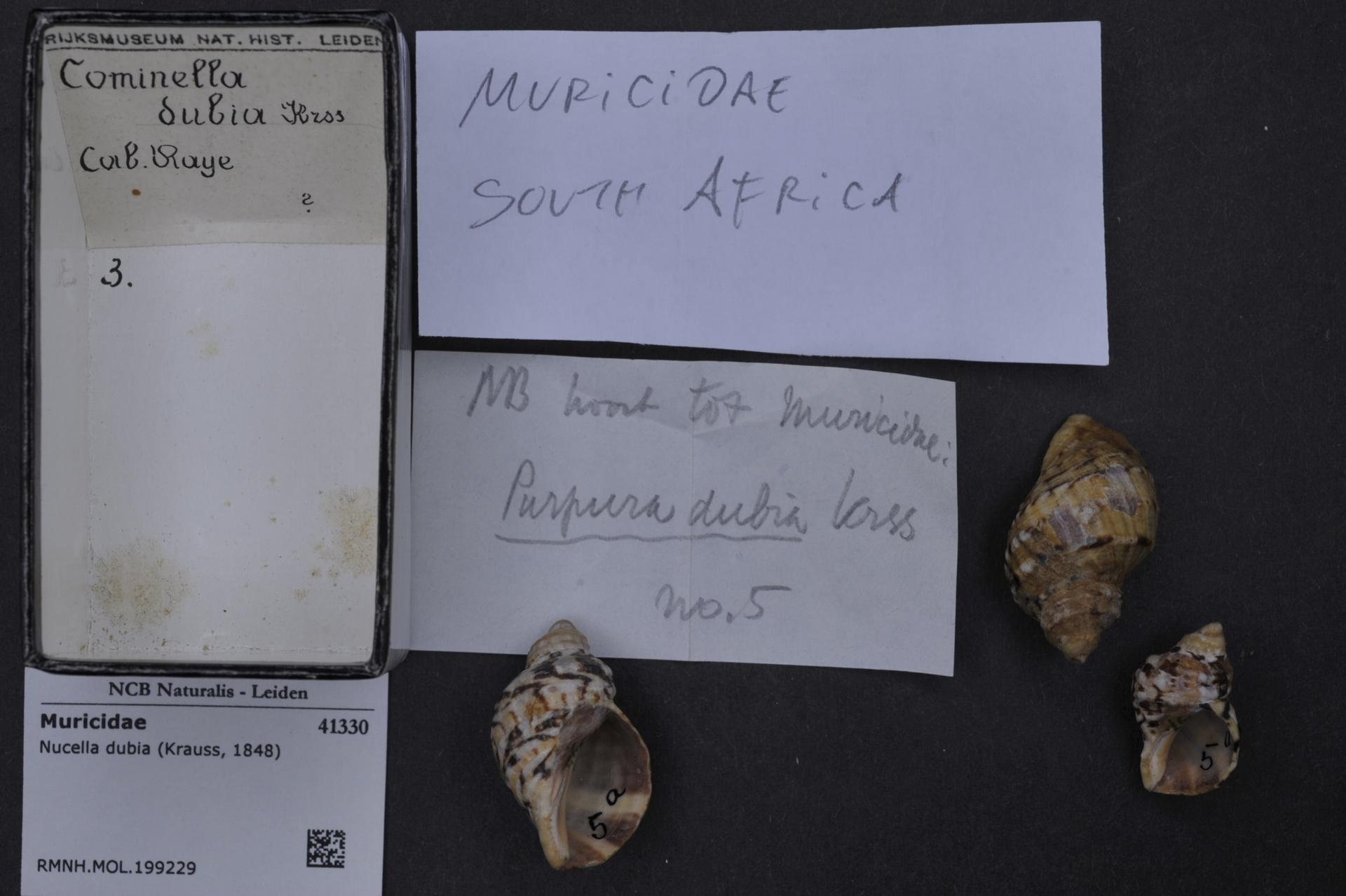

Scientific classification
- Kingdom: Animalia
- Phylum: Mollusca
- Class: Gastropoda
- Subclass: Caenogastropoda
- Order: Neogastropoda
- Family: Muricidae
- Genus: Nucella
- Species: N. dubia

Binomial name
- Nucella dubia (Krauss, 1848)

Synonyms
- Cominella acutispira Sowerby, 1821; Nucella pyramidalis (Turton, 1932); Purpura dubia Krauss, 1848; Purpura zeyheri Krauss, 1852; Thais pyramidalis Turton, 1932; Thais rufanensis Turton, 1932; Trophon acutispira (G. B. Sowerby III, 1921)

= Nucella dubia =

Species of gastropod

Nucella dubia, common name the common dogwhelk, is a species of sea snail, a marine gastropod mollusk in the family Muricidae, the murex snails or rock snails.

== Distribution ==
This marine species occurs off Namibia and off the South Coast and West Coast of South Africa.
