= Nucella wahlbergi =

Scientific classification
- Kingdom: Animalia
- Phylum: Mollusca
- Class: Gastropoda
- Subclass: Caenogastropoda
- Order: Neogastropoda
- Family: Muricidae
- Genus: Nucella
- Species: N. wahlbergi

Binomial name
- Nucella wahlbergi (Krauss, 1848)

Synonyms
- Murex wahlbergi Krauss, 1848; Nucella lindaniae Lorenz, 1991; Purpura wahlbergi Krauus, 1848; Vitularia candida H.& A. Adams, 1864

Species of gastropod

Nucella wahlbergi is a species of sea snail, a marine gastropod mollusk in the family Muricidae, the murex snails or rock snails.
