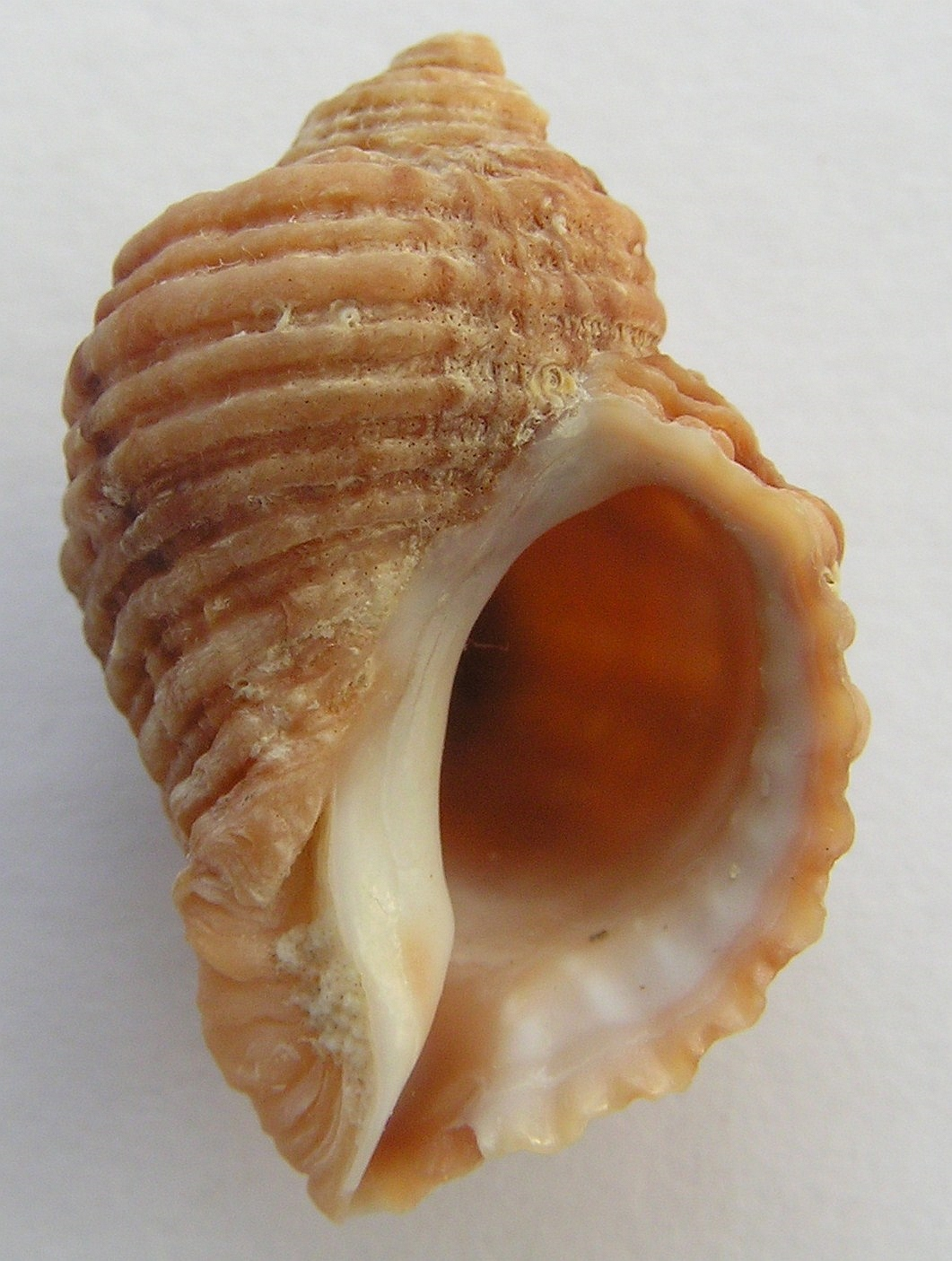

Scientific classification
- Kingdom: Animalia
- Phylum: Mollusca
- Class: Gastropoda
- Subclass: Caenogastropoda
- Order: Neogastropoda
- Family: Muricidae
- Genus: Nucella
- Species: N. freycinetii

Binomial name
- Nucella freycinetii (Deshayes, 1839)

Synonyms
- Purpura alabaster Pilsbry, 1907; Purpura freycinetii Deshayes, 1839; Purpura freycinetii alabaster Pilsbry, 1907 (original combination; junior synonym); Purpura saxicola Valenciennes, 1846

= Nucella freycinetii =

Species of gastropod

Nucella freycinetii is a species of sea snail, a marine gastropod mollusk in the family Muricidae, the murex snails or rock snails.

== Distribution ==
This marine species occurs off Kamchatka.
