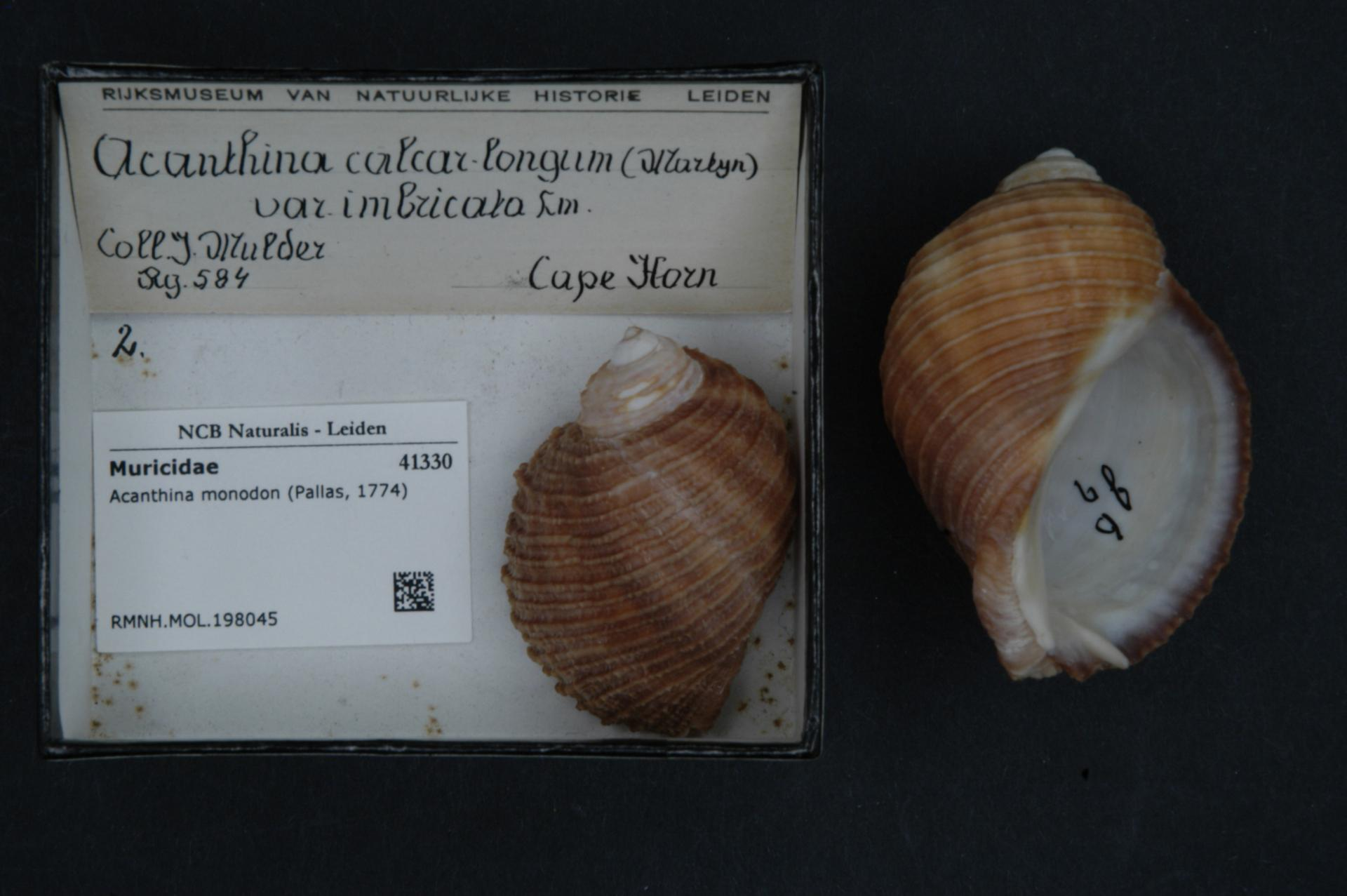
- Acanthina monodon shells

Scientific classification
- Kingdom: Animalia
- Phylum: Mollusca
- Class: Gastropoda
- Subclass: Caenogastropoda
- Order: Neogastropoda
- Family: Muricidae
- Genus: Acanthina
- Species: A. monodon

Binomial name
- Acanthina monodon (Pallas, 1774)

Synonyms
- Acanthina costata Fischer, 1807; Acanthina imbricata Fischer, 1807; Acanthina laevigata Fischer, 1807; Buccinum monoceros Bruguière, 1789; Buccinum monodon Pallas, 1774; Buccinum narval Bruguière, 1789; Monoceros acuminatum Sowerby, 1835; Monoceros breve Sowerby, 1821; Monoceros calcar sensu Martyn, 1784 Deshayes, 1844; Monoceros costatum Sowerby, 1835; Monoceros imbricatum Lamarck, 1816; Monoceros striatum Lamarck, 1822; Unicornus typus Montfort, 1810

= Acanthina monodon =

Species of gastropod

Acanthina monodon is a species of sea snail, a marine gastropod mollusk in the family Muricidae, the murex snails or rock snails.
