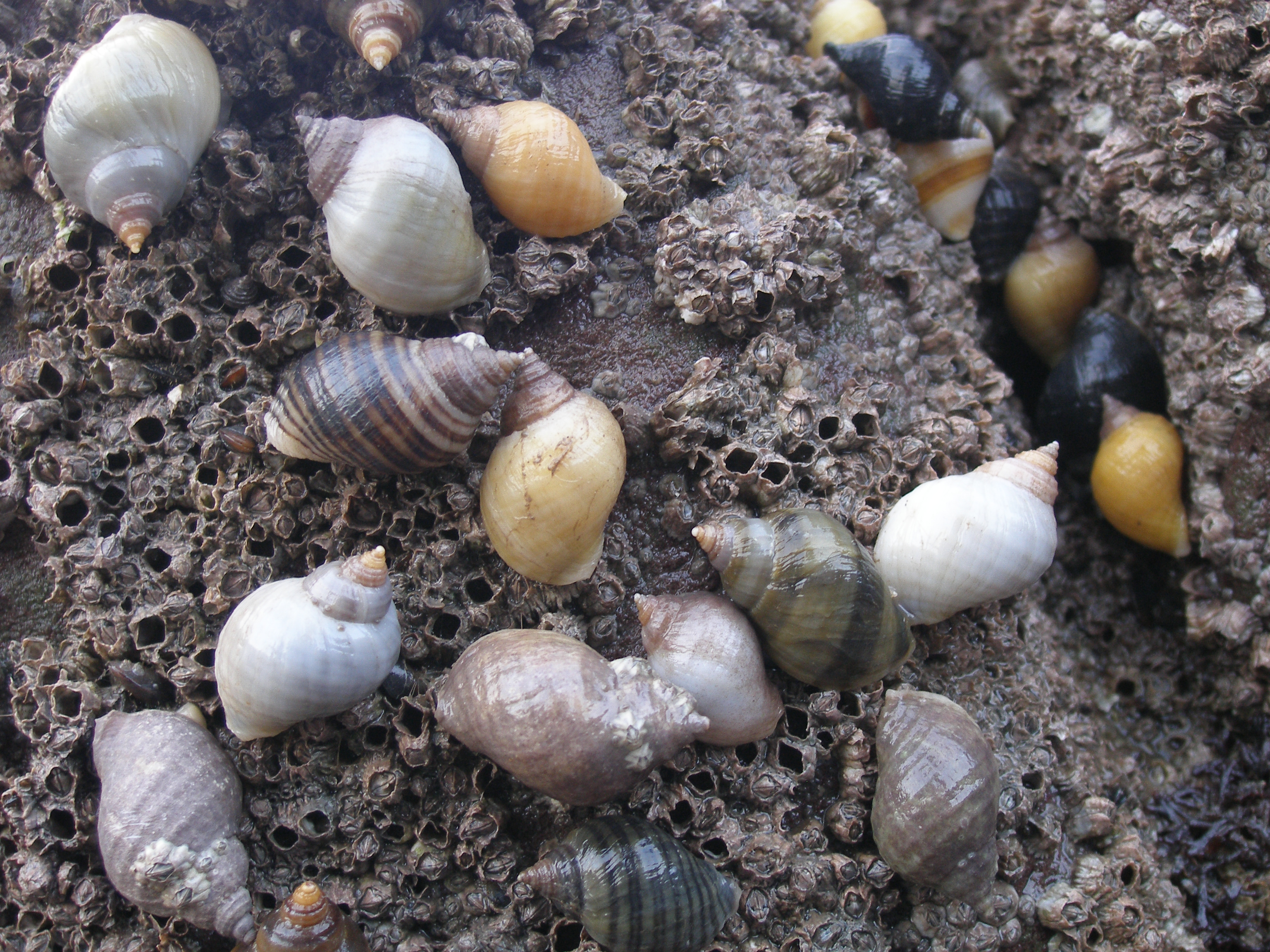
- A group of live Nucella lapillus on the barnacles which they eat.
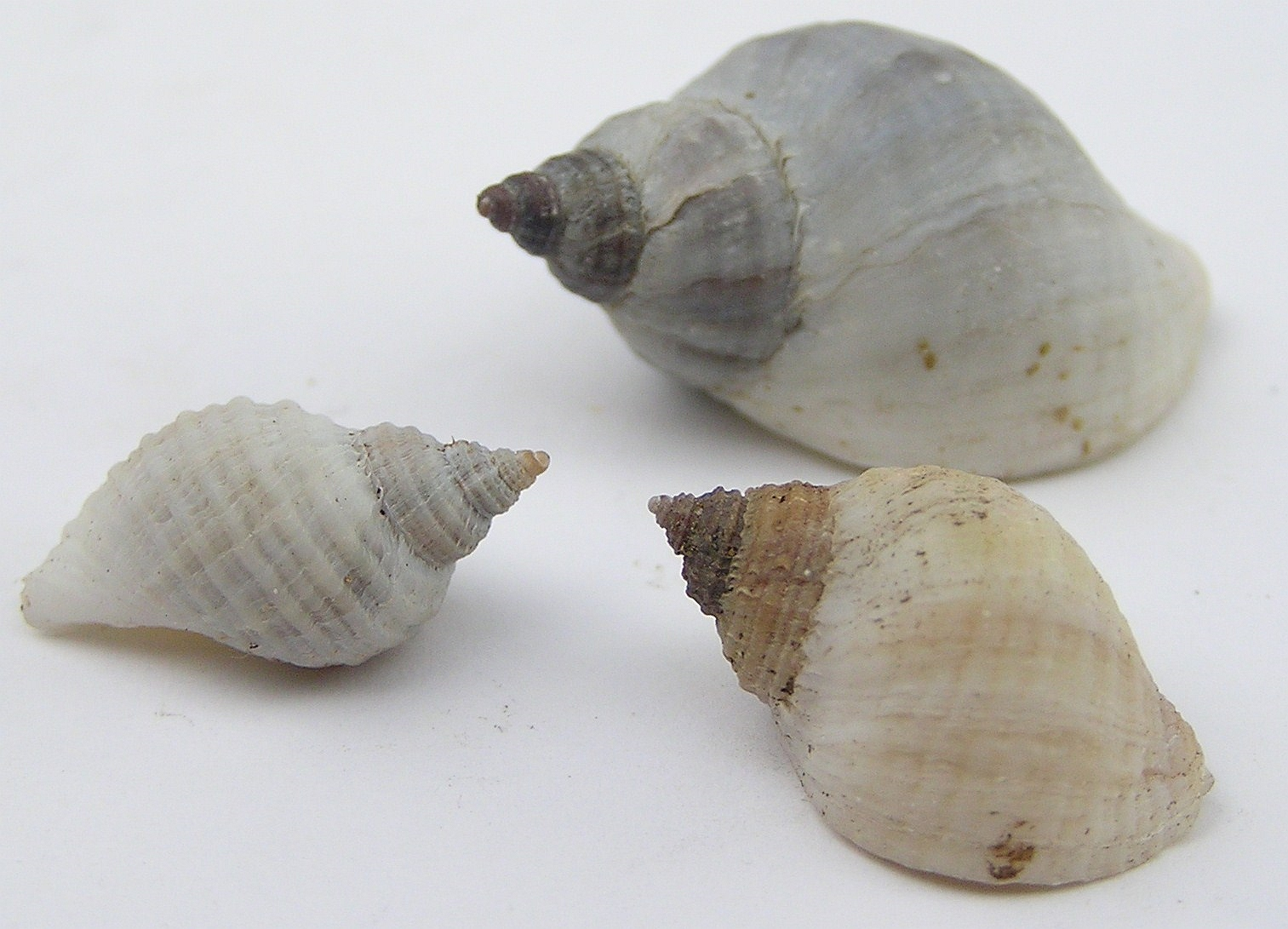
- Nucella lapillus shells

Scientific classification
- Kingdom: Animalia
- Phylum: Mollusca
- Class: Gastropoda
- Subclass: Caenogastropoda
- Order: Neogastropoda
- Family: Muricidae
- Genus: Nucella
- Species: N. lapillus

Binomial name
- Nucella lapillus (Linnaeus, 1758)

Synonyms
- Buccinum filosa Gmelin, 1791; Buccinum lapillus Linnaeus, 1758 (basionym); Nassa ligata Röding, 1798; Nassa rudis Roding, 1798; Nucella theobroma Roding, 1798; Purpura buccinoidea Blainville, 1829; Purpura imbricata Lamarck, 1822; Purpura lapillus (Linnaeus, 1758); Purpura lapillus var. anomala Middendorff, 1849; Purpura lapillus var. aurantia Dautzenberg, 1887; Purpura lapillus var. bizonalis Lamarck, 1822; Purpura lapillus var. caerulescens Dautzenberg, 1920; Purpura lapillus var. castanea Dautzenberg, 1887; Purpura lapillus var. celtica Locard, 1886; Purpura lapillus var. citrina Dautzenberg, 1920; Purpura lapillus var. crassissima Dautzenberg, 1887; Purpura lapillus var. fauce-violaceo Dautzenberg, 1887; Purpura lapillus var. fusco-apicata Dautzenberg & Fischer, 1925; Purpura lapillus var. lactea Dautzenberg, 1887; Purpura lapillus var. major Jeffreys, 1867; Purpura lapillus var. minor Jeffreys, 1867; Purpura lapillus var. mixta Dautzenberg, 1920; Purpura lapillus var. monozonalis Dautzenberg, 1920; Purpura lapillus var. ponderosa Verkrüzen, 1881; Purpura lineolata Dautzenberg, 1887; Thais lapillus Linnaeus, 1758

= Dog whelk =

Species of gastropod

The dog whelk, dogwhelk, or Atlantic dogwinkle (Nucella lapillus) is a species of predatory sea snail, a carnivorous marine gastropod in the family Muricidae, the rock snails.

Nucella lapillus was originally described by Carl Linnaeus in his landmark 1758 10th edition of Systema Naturae as Buccinum lapillus (the basionym).

== Distribution ==
This species is found around the coasts of Europe and in the northern west Atlantic coast of North America. It also can be found in estuarine waters along the Atlantic coasts. This species prefers rocky shores, where it eats mussels and acorn barnacles.

== Shell description ==
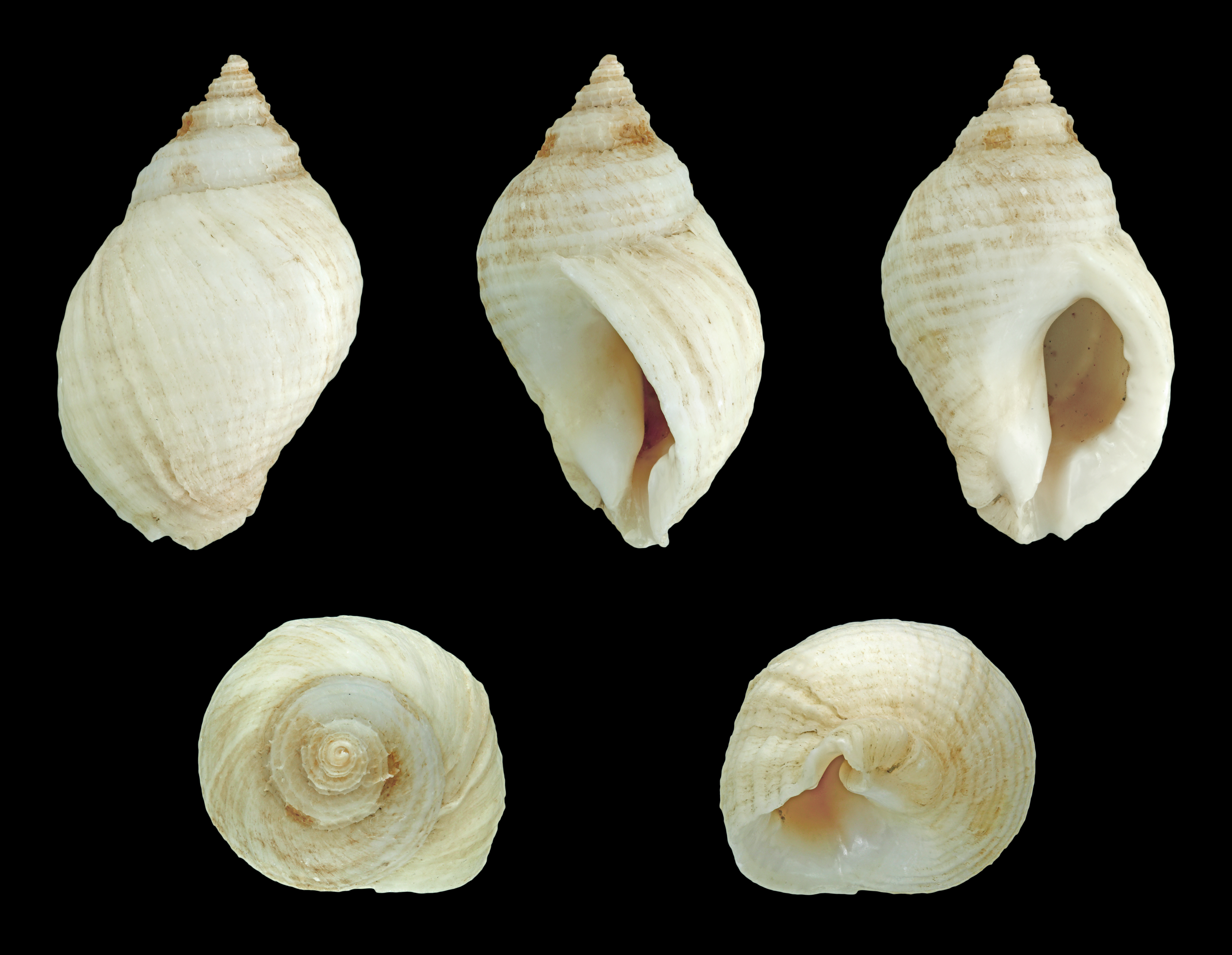
Five views of a white shell of Nucella lapillus

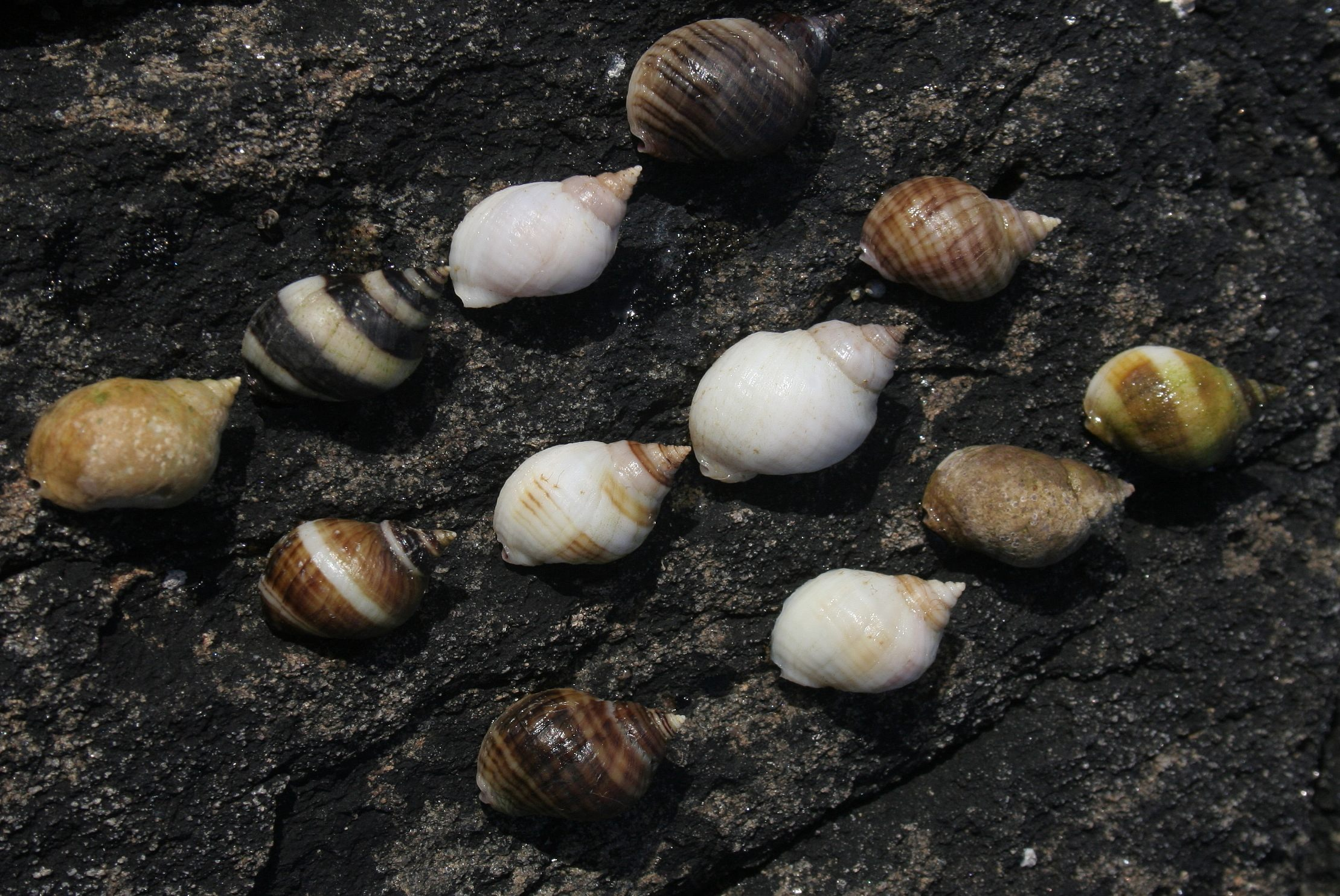
Colour variability of shells of Nucella lapillus.

The dog whelk shell is small and rounded with a pointed spire and a short, straight siphonal canal (a groove on the underside of the shell) and a deep anal canal. The overall shell shape varies quite widely according to the degree of exposure to wave action of the shore on which a particular population lives but the body whorl (the largest section of the shell where the majority of the visceral mass is located) is usually around 3/4 of the total length of the shell. The aperture is usually crenulated in mature dog whelks, less often in juveniles.

The shell surface can be fairly smooth interrupted only with growth lines, or when the snail is living in more sheltered areas the shell surface can be somewhat rough and lamellose. The surface is spirally corded. The outer lip is dentate and ridged within. The columella is smooth.

The external shell colour is usually a whitish grey, but can be a wide variety of orange, yellow, brown, black, or banded with any combination of these colours. They can even, occasionally, be green, blue, or pink.

== Ecology ==
=== Habitat ===
The dog whelk lives on rocky shores, and in estuarine conditions. Climatically it lives between the 0 °C and 20 °C isotherms.

=== Effects of the habitat ===
Wave action tends to confine the dog whelk to more sheltered shores, however, this can be counteracted, both by adaptations to tolerate it such as the shell and muscular foot, and by the avoidance of direct exposure to wave action afforded by making use of sheltered microhabitats in rocky crevices. The preferred substrate material of the dog whelk is solid rock and not sand, which adds to its problems at lower levels on the shore where weathering is likely to have reduced the stability of the seabed. Water loss by evaporation has to be tolerated (by means of the operculum which holds water in and prevents its escape as vapour), or avoided (by moving into water or a shaded area).

The peak in dog whelk population density is approximately coincidental with the mid-tidal zone. It lives in the middle shore. In general it can be said that at high vertical heights on the shoreline the dog whelk is most threatened by biotic factors such as predation from birds and interspecific competition for food, but abiotic factors are the primary concern, creating a harsh environment in which it is difficult to survive. At low vertical heights it is biotic factors, such as predation from crabs and intraspecific competition, which cause problems. The upper limit of the range in which the dog whelk is generally found is approximately coincidental with the mean high water neap tide line, and the lower limit of the range is approximately coincidental with the mean low water neap tide line, so that the vast majority of dog whelks are found on the mid-tidal zone.

Tidal pools and comparable microhabitats extend the vertical range of organisms such as the dog whelk as they provide a more constant environment, but they are prone to increased salinity because evaporation concentrates dissolved substances. This can create toxic conditions for many species.

The dog whelk can only survive out of water for a limited period, as it will gradually become desiccated and die. Metabolic processes within cells take place in solution, and a decrease in water content makes it impossible for the organism to function properly. In experiments it has been shown that 50% of dog whelks die at 40 °C. The dog whelk has to excrete ammonia directly into water, as it does not have the adaptation possessed by many upper shore species which would allow it to produce uric acid for excretion without loss of water. When kept emersed for seven days at a temperature of 18 °C, 100% of dog whelks die, in contrast to many periwinkle species which can lose even more water than the dog whelk (i.e. more than 37% of their total body mass) but survive as a result of their ability to excrete toxic waste products more efficiently.

=== Feeding habits ===
Its adaptations include a modified radula (a toothed chitinous structure) to bore holes in the shells of prey, complemented by an organ on the foot which secretes a shell-softening chemical. When a hole has been formed paralysing chemicals and digestive enzymes are secreted inside the shell to break the soft body down into a 'soup' which can be sucked out with the proboscis. The plates of barnacles can be pushed apart with the proboscis, and the entire individual is eaten in about a day, although larger animals such as mussels may take up to a week to digest.

Feeding only occurs when conditions are conducive to such an activity, and during these times the dog whelk consumes large quantities of food so that the gut is always kept as full as possible. This allows shelter until more food is required, when foraging resumes. If waves are large or there is an excessive risk of water loss the dog whelk will remain inactive in sheltered locations for long periods.

Mussels have developed a defensive strategy of tethering and immobilising with byssus threads any dog whelks invading their beds, leading to the whelks' starvation.

Nucella lapillus's feeding activity is suppressed on brighter moonlight nights, in order to minimize predation risks. High-intensity ALAN levels reversed the pattern. In fact, N. lapillus would more likely forage when Artificial Light At Night (ALAN) intensities range from 10 to 50 lx, which are way higher than lunar brightness. This allows dog whelks to easily exclude predation risk.

=== Life cycle ===
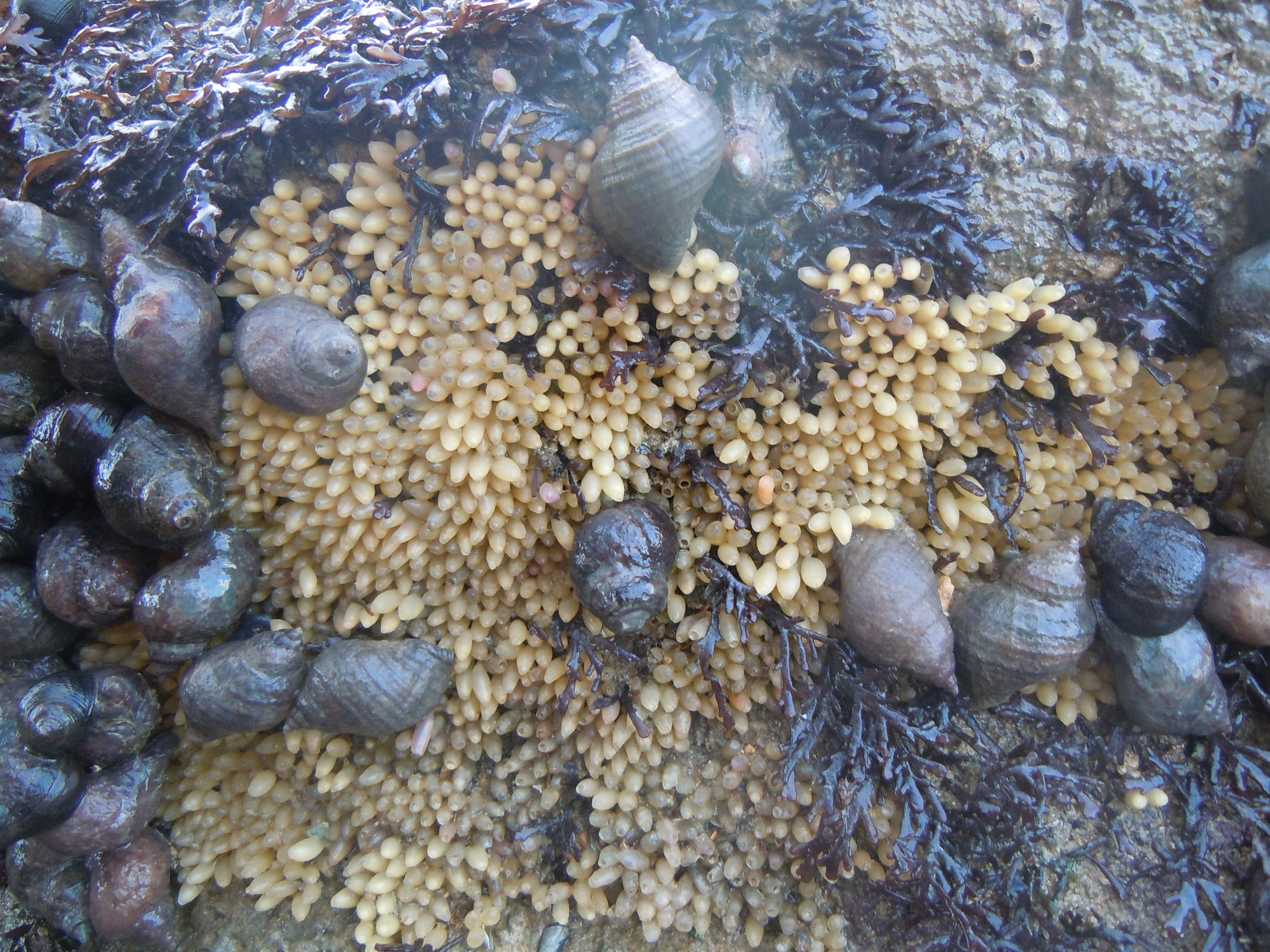
Nucella lapillus snails and their freshly laid egg capsules.

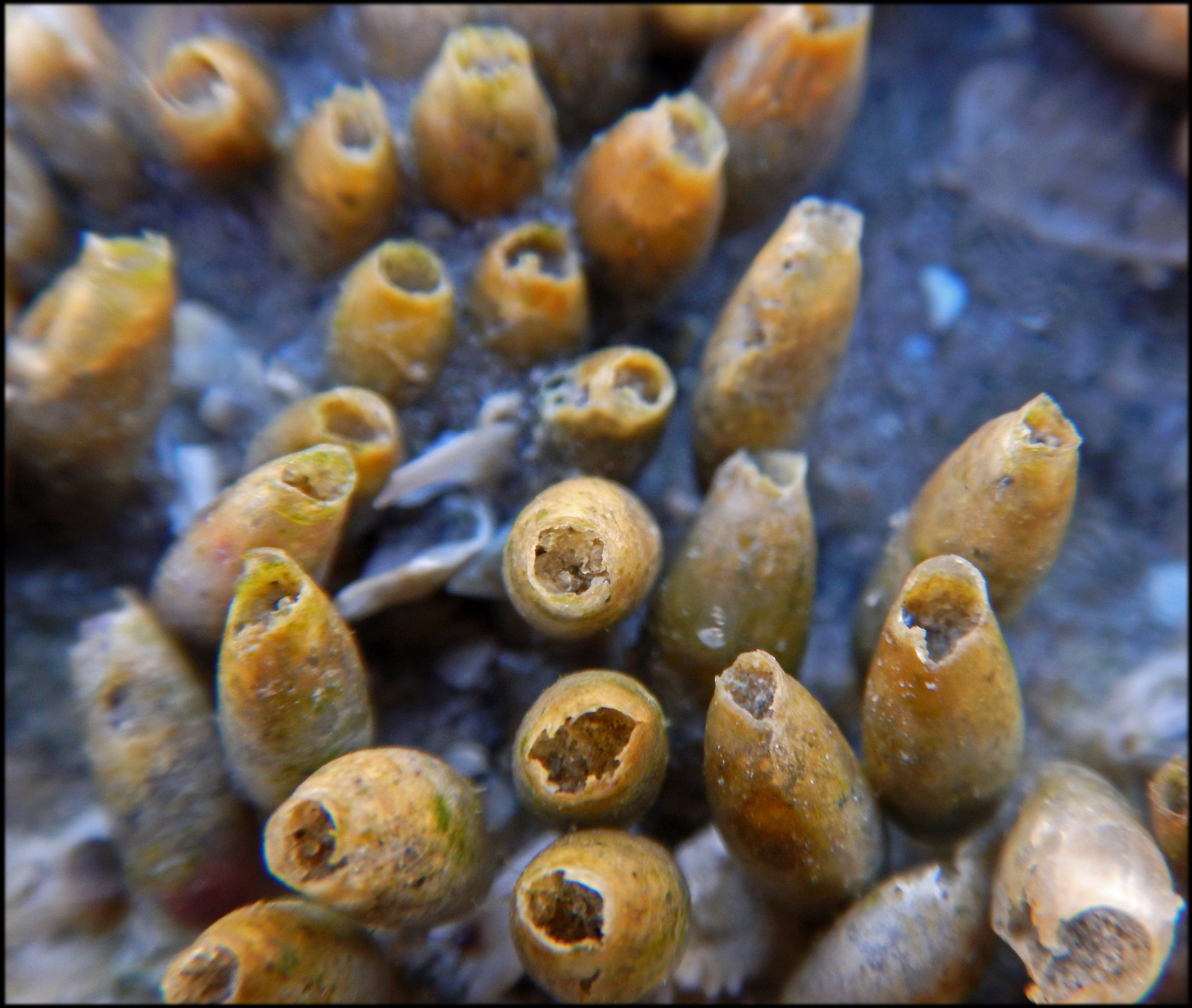
Empty egg capsules of Nucella lapillus.

=== Predators ===
Predators of the dog whelk include various species of crabs and birds. Protection against predation from crabs which attempt to pull the soft body out through the shell aperture can be afforded by growing teeth around the edge of the aperture. Many predators cannot smash the strong shell of an adult dog whelk, but juveniles are vulnerable to attack from many predatory species. Eider ducks and various other birds simply swallow the entire body with its shell, while oystercatchers and various crustaceans are often capable of crushing or breaking the shells. In the winter they endure more predation from purple sandpipers and similar wading birds, but in the summer crabs represent a greater threat. In general, the dog whelk can be thought of as being vulnerable to birds when emersed, and to crabs when immersed.

== Human use ==
The dog-whelk can be used to produce red-purple and violet dyes, like its Mediterranean relations the spiny dye-murex Bolinus brandaris, the banded dye-murex Hexaplex trunculus and the rock-shell Stramonita haemastoma which provided the red-purple and violet colours that the Ancient World valued so highly. Bede mentions that in Britain "whelks are abundant, and a beautiful scarlet dye is extracted from them which remains unfaded by sunshine or rain; indeed, the older the cloth, the more beautiful its colour."

In Ireland, on the island of Inishkea North, Co. Mayo, archaeologists found a whelk-dyeing workshop, dated to the 7th century AD, complete with a small, presumed vat, and a pile of broken-open dog-whelk shells. Unfortunately, no such workshop is known from Britain for the early medieval period. However, a double-checked trace of bromine, indicating the presence of whelk-dye, has been found on one page of an Anglo-Saxon book known as the Barberini Gospels. This manuscript dates to the late 8th or early 9th century AD, and the whelk dye occurs as a background panel to white lettering at the beginning of St John's gospel. Efforts have also been made to find whelk dye on surviving fragments of Anglo-Saxon textiles, but the chemical analyses so far carried out have proved negative for bromine.

An Anglo-Saxon account of the accession ceremony of Aldfrith of Northumbria involved whelk-dyed cloth, although this may simply be a poetic echo of Roman ceremonies. Another example involves an account of valuable textiles brought to England by Wilfrid of Ripon.
