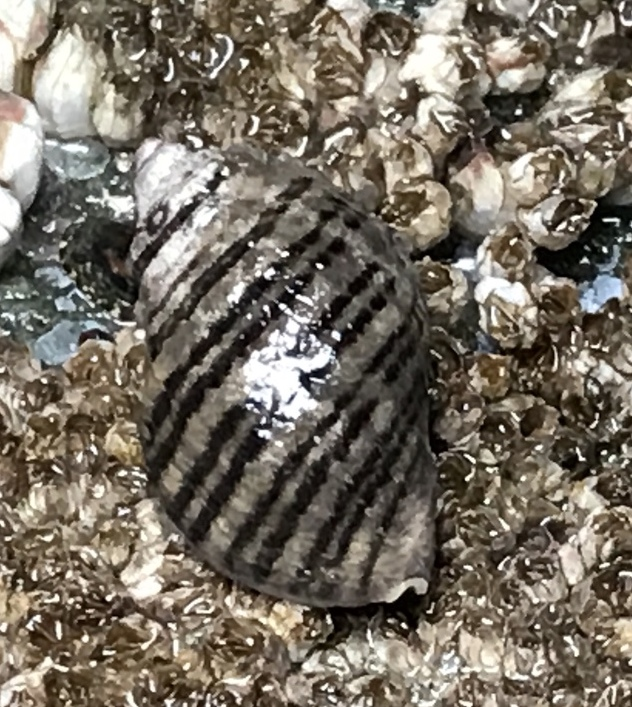

Scientific classification
- Kingdom: Animalia
- Phylum: Mollusca
- Class: Gastropoda
- Subclass: Caenogastropoda
- Order: Neogastropoda
- Family: Muricidae
- Genus: Nucella
- Species: N. ostrina

Binomial name
- Nucella ostrina (Gould, 1852)

Synonyms
- Purpura ostrina Gould, 1852; Thais emarginata var. projecta Dall, 1915

= Nucella ostrina =

Species of gastropod

Nucella ostrina, the northern striped dogwinkle, is a species of sea snail, a marine gastropod mollusk in the family Muricidae, the murex snails or rock snails. Other common names for this mollusk include emarginate dogwinkle, short-spired purple dogwinkle, striped dogwinkle, ribbed dogwinkle, emarginate whelk, ribbed rock whelk, rock thais, short-spired purple snail and rock whelk.

== Description ==
This dogwinkle has a robust shell with three indistinct whorls. It can be 4 cm (1.6 in) in length, but a more typical length is 3 cm (1.2 in) or less; the aperture is less than half the diameter of the shell and can be closed by a brown, horny operculum. The exterior of the shell is spirally ridged, often with heavy ridges alternating with more delicate ones. The heavy ridges may bear coarse nodules, but in more exposed locations these, and the ridges themselves, may be partially smoothed. The ridges tend to be pale in color and the furrows between them dark, typically brown, gray, black, orange or yellow. The interior of the shell is purple.

== Distribution and habitat ==
N. ostrina is native to the northeastern Pacific Ocean. Its range extends down the western coast of North America from the Aleutian Islands, Alaska, to Cayucos, California. It is found in the intertidal zone on rocky coasts, often in the vicinity of mussel beds, and particularly in wave-exposed positions.

== Ecology ==
Like the other members of its family, this dogwinkle is a predator. Each individual has its own food preferences, but the population as a whole feeds predominantly on mussels and barnacles (Balanus glandula), but sometimes on periwinkles (Littorina sitkana and Littorina planaxis), or limpets (Collisella scabra). The bay mussel (Mytilus trossulus) is usually preferred as prey over the California mussel (Mytilus californianus). Having selected its prey, the dogwinkle drills into the shell with its radula, injects digestive enzymes which liquefy the tissues, and sucks out the contents.

The dogwinkle is itself eaten by the purple sea star (Pisaster ochraceus) and the red rock crab (Cancer productus). It lays its eggs in clusters of stalked capsules, known as "sea oats", which are attached to rocks high up in the intertidal zone. Although there are around 550 eggs in each capsule, most of the eggs are infertile and are consumed by the developing juveniles, 10 to 20 of which hatch from the capsule after three or four months, without an intermediate larval stage.
