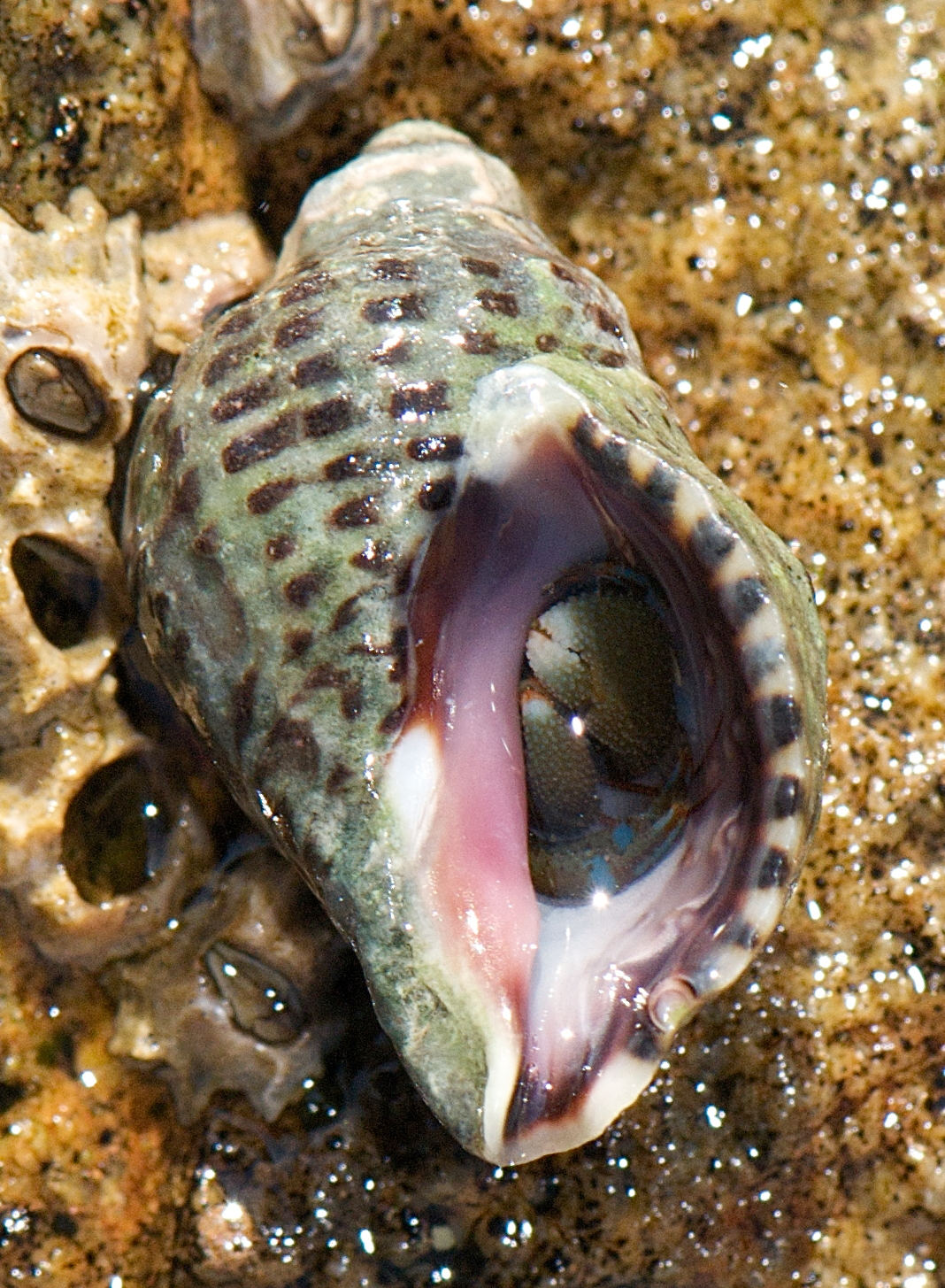
- A shell of A. punctutulata occupied by a hermit crab

Scientific classification
- Kingdom: Animalia
- Phylum: Mollusca
- Class: Gastropoda
- Subclass: Caenogastropoda
- Order: Neogastropoda
- Family: Muricidae
- Genus: Acanthinucella
- Species: A. punctulata

Binomial name
- Acanthinucella punctulata (Sowerby G.B. I, 1835)

Synonyms
- Monoceros punctulatum Sowerby, 1835; Purpura lapilloides Conrad, 1837

= Acanthinucella punctulata =

Species of gastropod

Acanthinucella punctulata (previously known as Acanthina punctulata), the spotted thorn drupe, is a species of predatory sea snail, a marine gastropod mollusk in the family Muricidae, the murex snails or rock snails.

== Description ==
These snails are small in size, about 2.5 cm. in length. The shell has dark spiral markings resembling wide dots or dashes.

== Distribution ==
These snails are found on the West Coast of North America, from Monterey, California, to northern Baja California, Mexico.

== Habitat ==
A. punctulata lives on rocky shores in the upper intertidal zone.

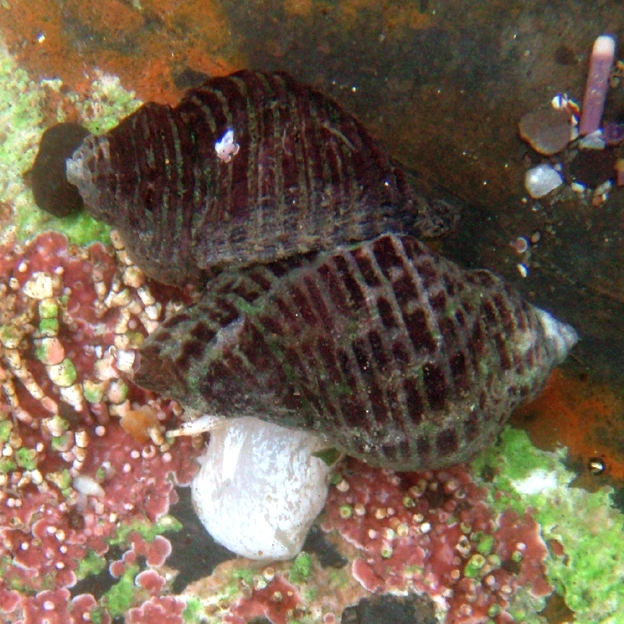
A pair of A. punctulata mating in a tide pool in central California
