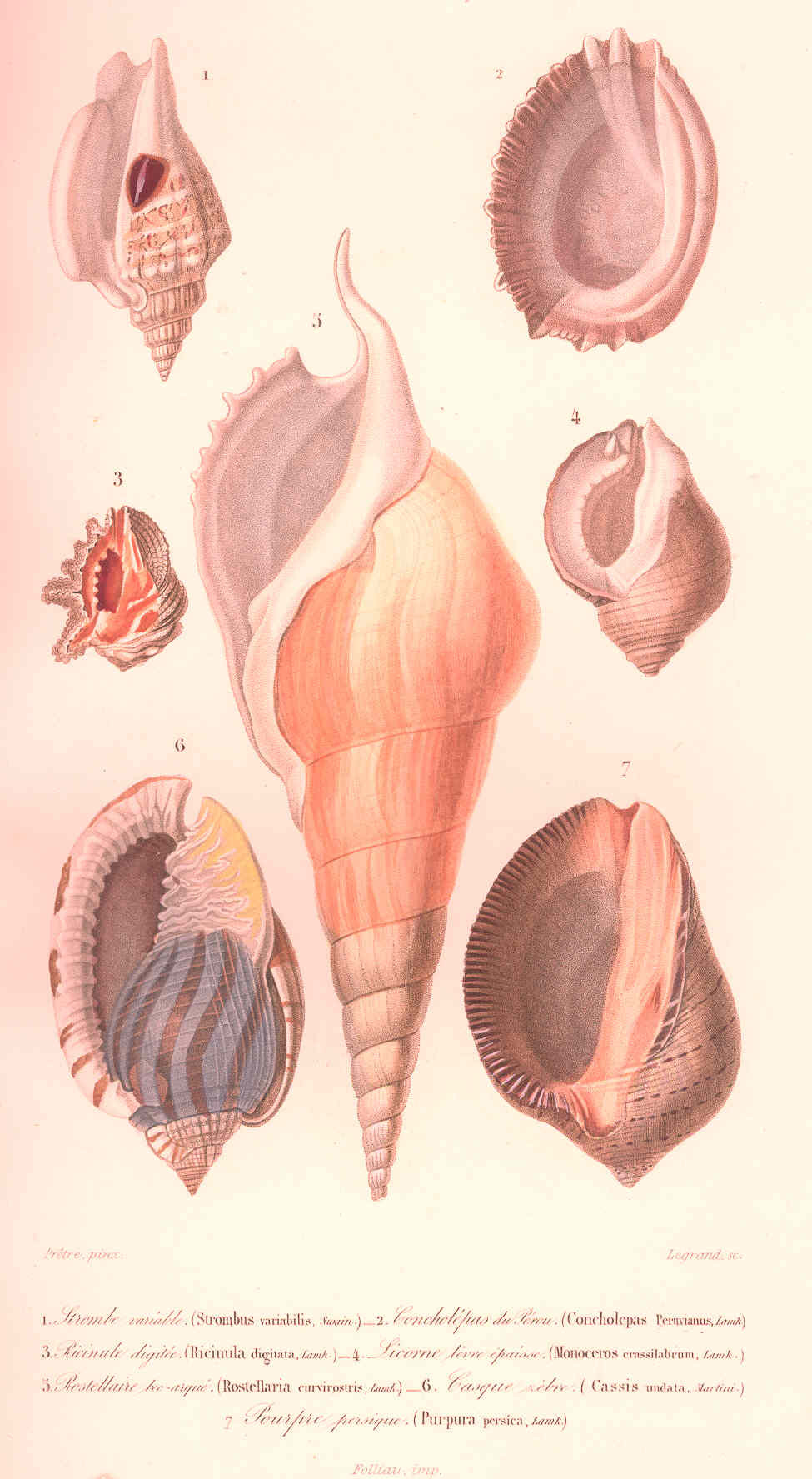
- Acanthina unicornis shell drawing (number 4)

Scientific classification
- Kingdom: Animalia
- Phylum: Mollusca
- Class: Gastropoda
- Subclass: Caenogastropoda
- Order: Neogastropoda
- Family: Muricidae
- Genus: Acanthina
- Species: A. unicornis

Binomial name
- Acanthina unicornis (Bruguière, 1789)

Synonyms
- Buccinum dentatum Wood, 1818; Buccinum unicornis Bruguiere, 1789; Monoceros citrinum Sowerby, 1835; Monoceros crassilabrum Lamarck, 1816; Monoceros crassilabrum var. album Sowerby, 1835; Monoceros glabratum Lamarck, 1816; Monoceros globulus Sowerby, 1835; Nucella acuminata Carcelles, 1954; Purpura novaehollandiae Blainville, 1832

= Acanthina unicornis =

Species of gastropod

Acanthina unicornis is a species of sea snail, which is a marine gastropod mollusk in the family Muricidae, the murex snails or the rock snails.
