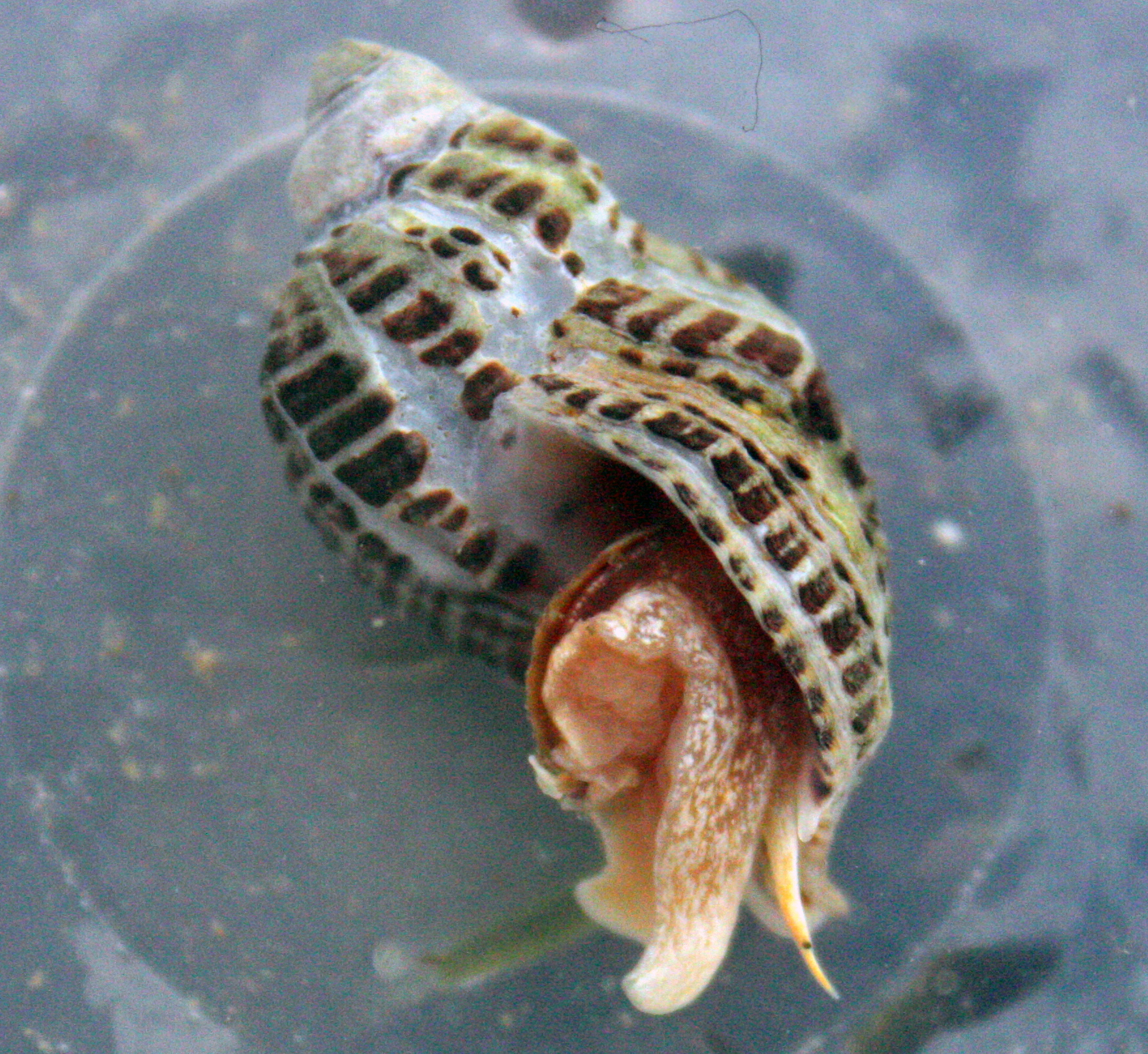
- A live Acanthinucella spirata

Scientific classification
- Kingdom: Animalia
- Phylum: Mollusca
- Class: Gastropoda
- Subclass: Caenogastropoda
- Order: Neogastropoda
- Family: Muricidae
- Genus: Acanthinucella
- Species: A. spirata

Binomial name
- Acanthinucella spirata (Blainville, 1832)

Synonyms
- Monoceros unicarinata Sowerby I, 1835; Purpura brevidens Conrad, 1837; Purpura engonata Conrad, 1837; Purpura lapilloides var. aurantia Dall, 1908; Purpura spirata Blainville, 1832

= Acanthinucella spirata =

Species of gastropod

Acanthinucella spirata is a species of predatory sea snail, a marine gastropod mollusk in the family Muricidae, the murex snails or rock snails.

== Biology ==
This species is predatory, preying on the genus Littorina. Its egg capsules are 4-9 mm long, and hold 17-49 embryos. It uses paralytic venom, presumably to hunt its prey.

== Distribution ==
A. spirata occurs on the West Coast, or the Pacific Ocean coast of North America, living in rocky intertidal zones.

== Human use ==
This species is known to have been exploited by some Native Americans such as the Chumash of Central California approximately 1000 to 1200 AD.
