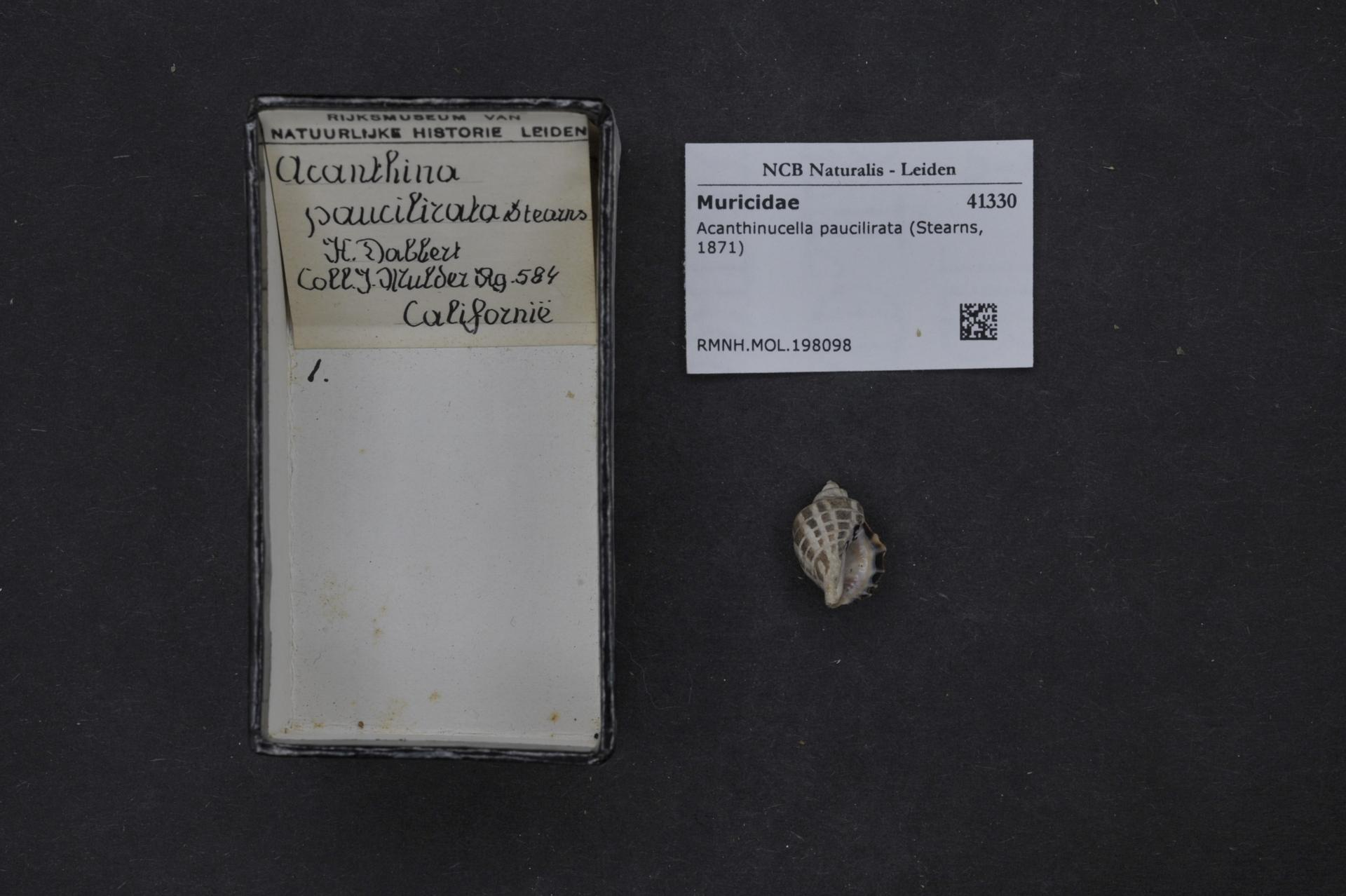
- Acanthinucella paucilirata (Stearns, 1871)

Scientific classification
- Kingdom: Animalia
- Phylum: Mollusca
- Class: Gastropoda
- Subclass: Caenogastropoda
- Order: Neogastropoda
- Family: Muricidae
- Genus: Acanthinucella
- Species: A. paucilirata

Binomial name
- Acanthinucella paucilirata (Stearns, 1871)

Synonyms
- Monoceros paucilirata Stearns, 1871

= Acanthinucella paucilirata =

Species of gastropod

Acanthinucella paucilirata is a species of sea snail, a marine gastropod mollusk in the family Muricidae, the murex snails or rock snails.
