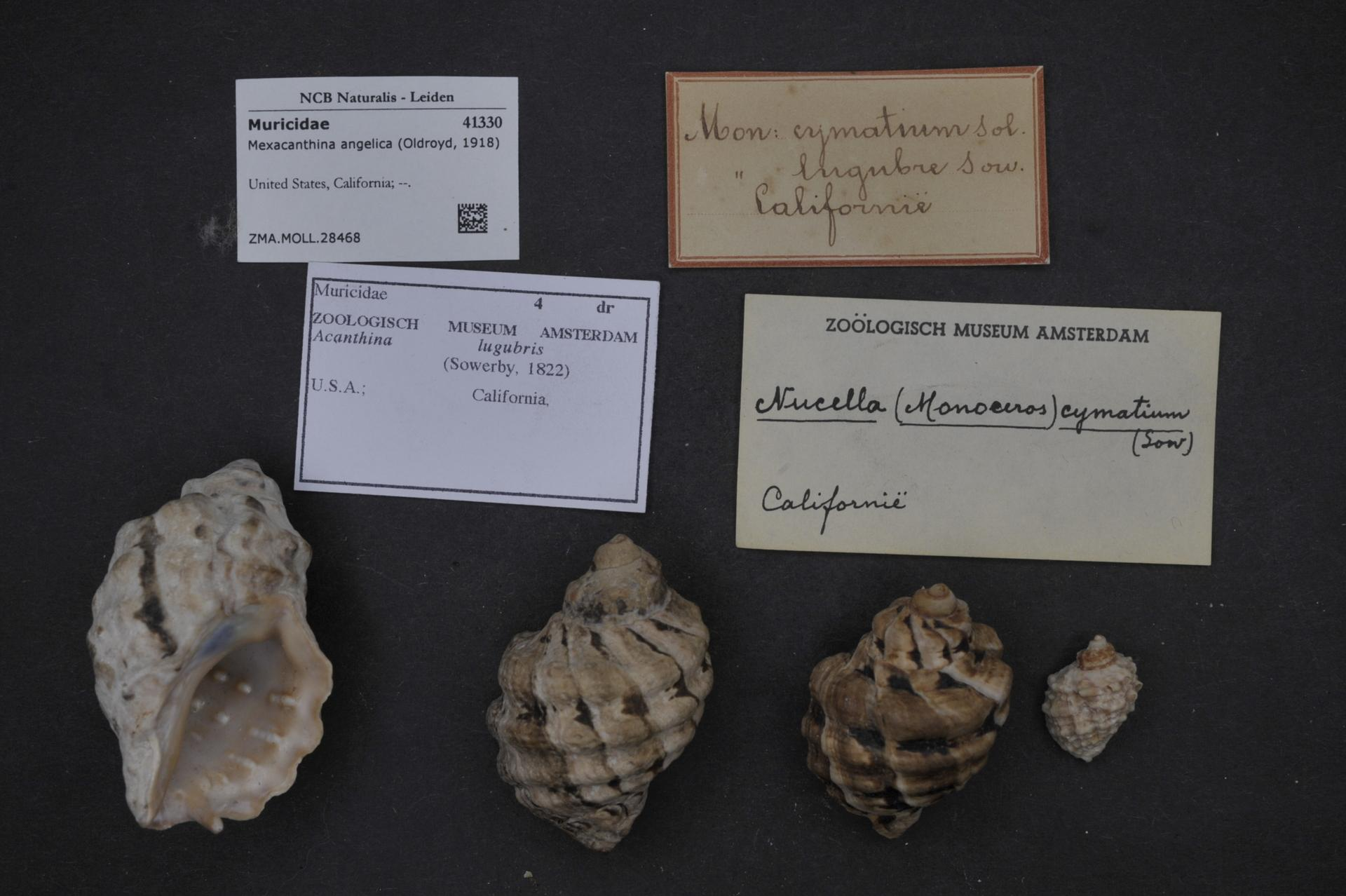

Scientific classification
- Kingdom: Animalia
- Phylum: Mollusca
- Class: Gastropoda
- Subclass: Caenogastropoda
- Order: Neogastropoda
- Family: Muricidae
- Genus: Mexacanthina
- Species: M. angelica

Binomial name
- Mexacanthina angelica (Oldroyd, 1918)

Synonyms
- Acanthina angelica Oldroyd, 1918

= Mexacanthina angelica =

Species of gastropod

Mexacanthina angelica is a species of sea snail, a marine gastropod mollusc in the family Muricidae, the murex snails or rock snails.
