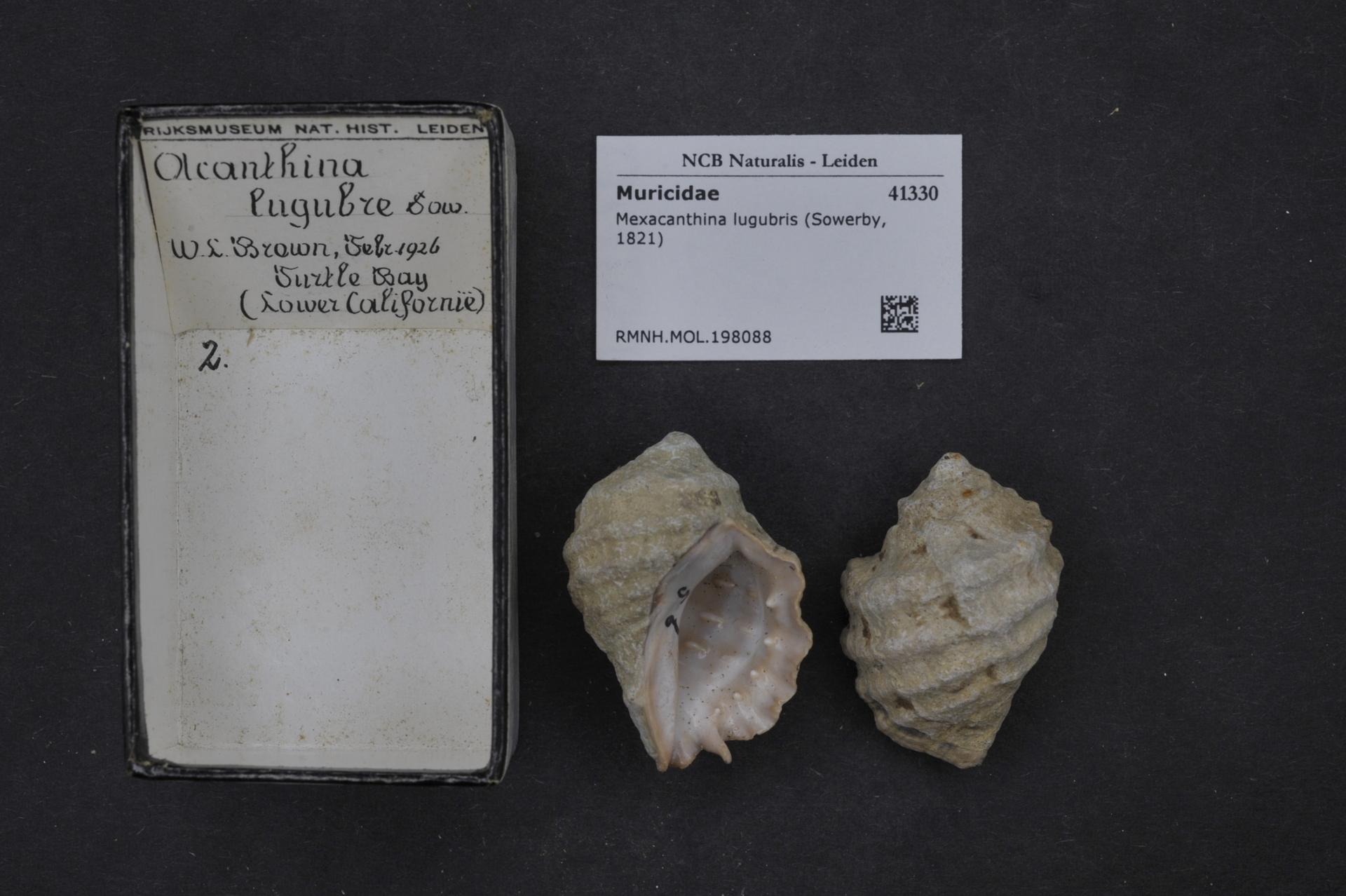

Scientific classification
- Kingdom: Animalia
- Phylum: Mollusca
- Class: Gastropoda
- Subclass: Caenogastropoda
- Order: Neogastropoda
- Family: Muricidae
- Genus: Mexacanthina
- Species: M. lugubris

Binomial name
- Mexacanthina lugubris (Sowerby, 1821)

Synonyms
- Acanthina tyrianthina Berry, 1957; Buccinum armatum Wood, 1828; Monoceros cymatum Sowerby, 1835; Monoceros denticulatum Wood, 1828; Monoceros lugubris Sowerby, 1821

= Mexacanthina lugubris =

Species of gastropod

Mexacanthina lugubris, also called dark unicorn, is a species of small predatory sea snail, a marine gastropod mollusk in the family Muricidae, the murex snails or rock snails.

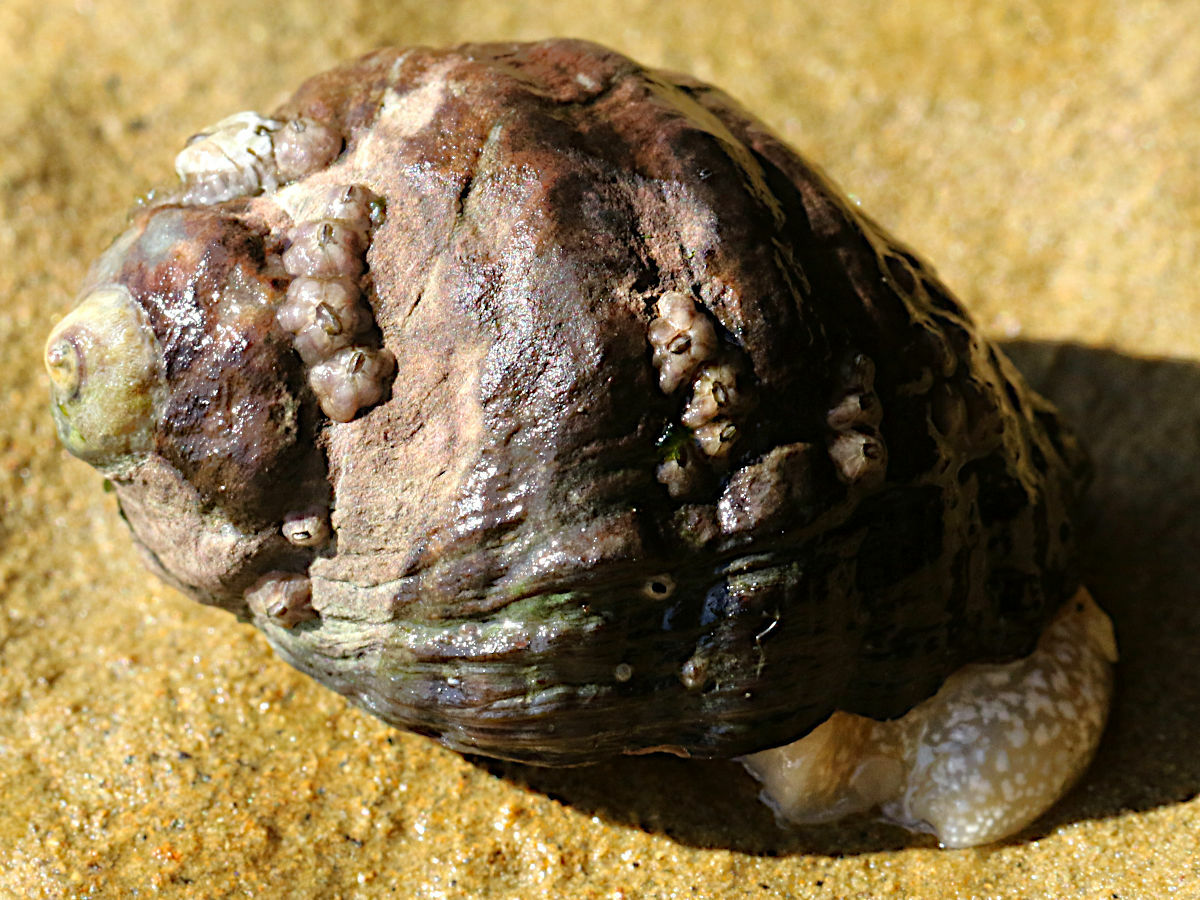
upperside

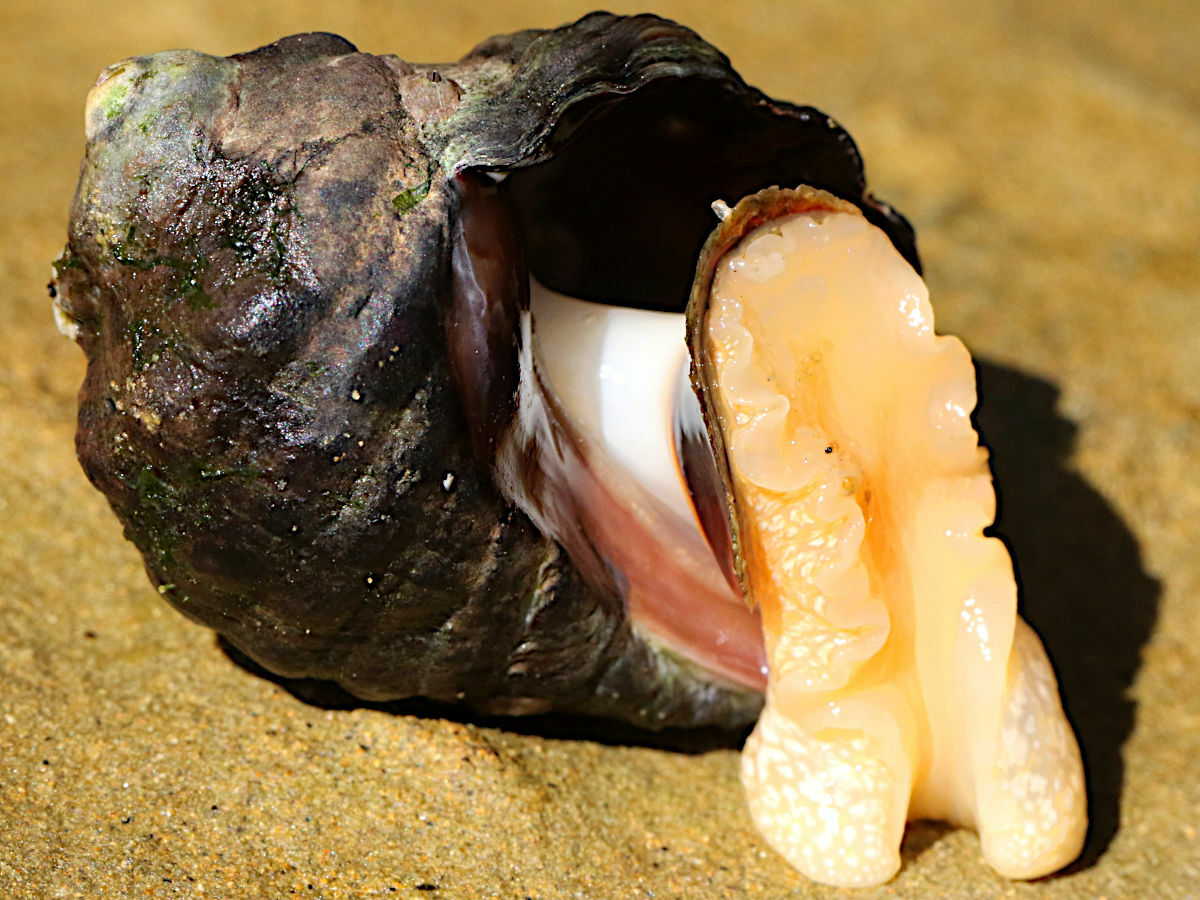
underside

turning over
