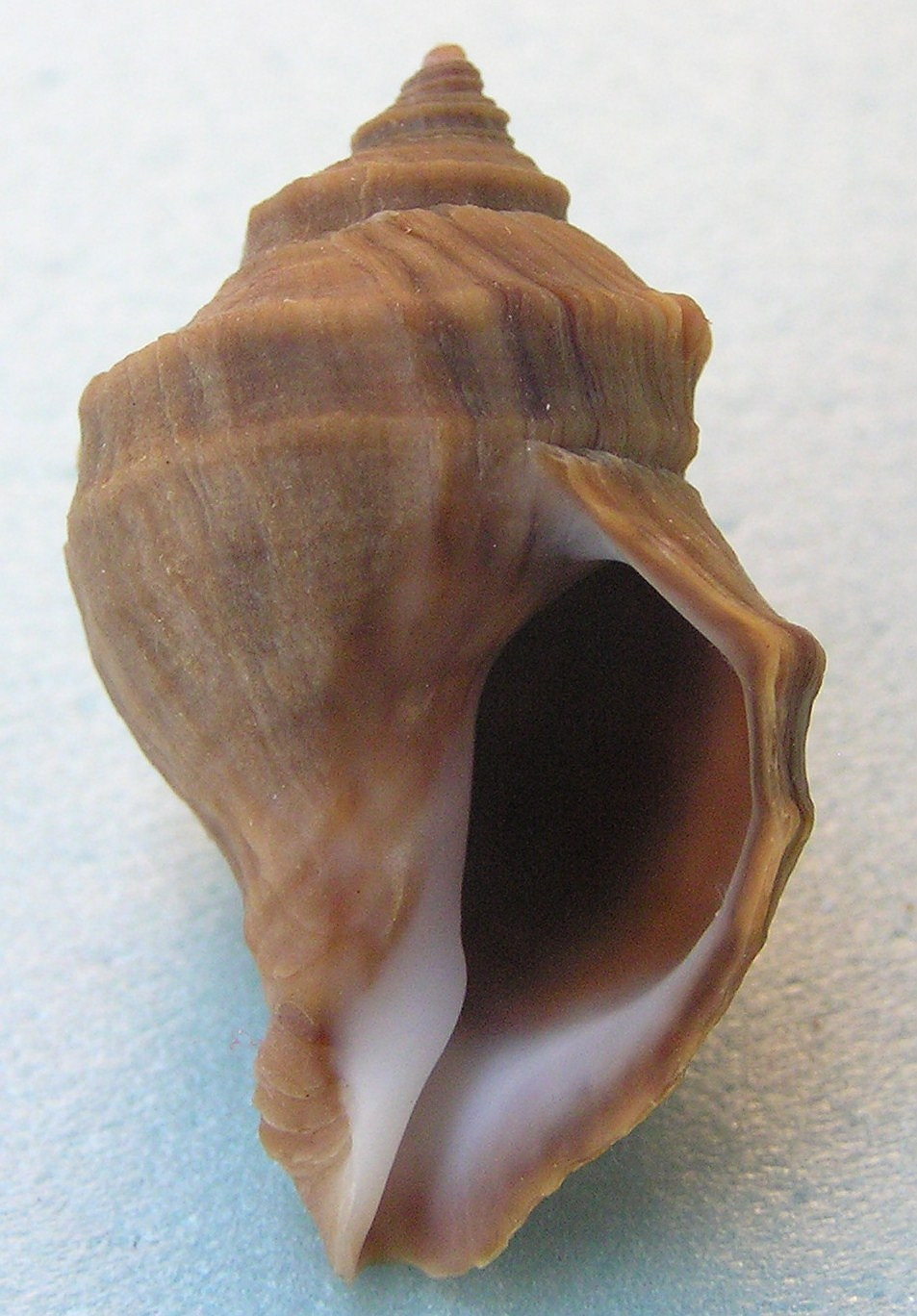

Scientific classification
- Kingdom: Animalia
- Phylum: Mollusca
- Class: Gastropoda
- Subclass: Caenogastropoda
- Order: Neogastropoda
- Family: Muricidae
- Genus: Nucella
- Species: N. lamellosa

Binomial name
- Nucella lamellosa (Gmelin, 1791)

Synonyms
- Buccinum lamellosa Gmelin, 1791; Murex crispata Holton, 1802; Murex ferrugineus Eschscholtz, 1829; Murex lactuca Eschscholtz, 1829; Polyplex rugosus Perry, 1811; Purpura plicatus Martens, 1872; Purpura septentrionalis Reeve, 1846; Sistrum ferrugineus (Eschscholtz, 1829); Thais cymica Dall, 1915; Thais franciscana Dall, 1915; Thais hormica Dall, 1915; Thais neptunea Dall, 1915; Thais sitkana Dall, 1915; Trophon lamellosus (Gmelin, 1791)

= Nucella lamellosa =

Species of gastropod

Nucella lamellosa, commonly known as the frilled dogwinkle or wrinkled purple whelk, is a species of sea snail, a marine gastropod mollusk in the family Muricidae, the murex snails or rock snails. This species occurs in the eastern Pacific Ocean, its range extending in the intertidal zone from the Aleutian Islands southward to central California.

== Description ==
Nucella lamellosa is a large snail with a strong shell growing to a length of 100 mm (4 in) and width of 50 mm (2 in). The shell has no more than seven whorls and has a horny operculum. The spire is well developed, with a short notch to accommodate the siphon. This snail is rather variable in colour, shape and surface texture. Some specimens are smooth, others rough and others have frilled lamellae (angular plates). Some of these features may be as a result of abrasion and wave action, and when present, the spiral sculpture takes the form of one or two ridges per whorl, the whorls being flattened near their joints making them appear to be angled. This snail can be white, grey, brown or orange, occasionally purplish, and is sometimes spirally banded.

== Distribution ==
This whelk is found in shallow waters in the eastern Pacific Ocean. Its range extends from the Bering Strait and the Aleutian Islands to central California. It is found intertidally on rocks from the mid to lower shore and is one of the commonest whelks in this habitat in the Pacific Northwest.

== Ecology ==
This whelk is a predator, feeding largely on mussels and barnacles. The radula is used to scrape through the shell of the prey and the soft tissue is extracted. The whelk is itself eaten by crabs such as the red rock crab Cancer productus and the seastar Pisaster ochraceus. In the presence of the crabs, there is a tendency for the whelk's shell to grow thicker and be more robust, and thus less easy for the crab to crush. This may be as a result of chemicals released into the water by the crabs because the thickness of the whelk's shell seems unaffected by the presence of Carcinus maenas, a recently introduced invasive species of crab that also feeds on whelks.

A different response in shell morphology was evinced in the presence of the seastar. Here, the shell tended to get longer with a high spire, enabling the whelk to retract its soft tissues as far as possible from the seastar. If both crabs and seastars were present, the shell phenotype that tended to evolve reflected the response to the predator that caused the greatest mortality. The whelks also show behavioural responses to both crabs and seastars by seeking refuge.

Breeding takes place in hidden locations such as under rocks, with many whelks congregating to mate and lay eggs in capsules which resemble clusters of oats as they dangle from the substrate.
