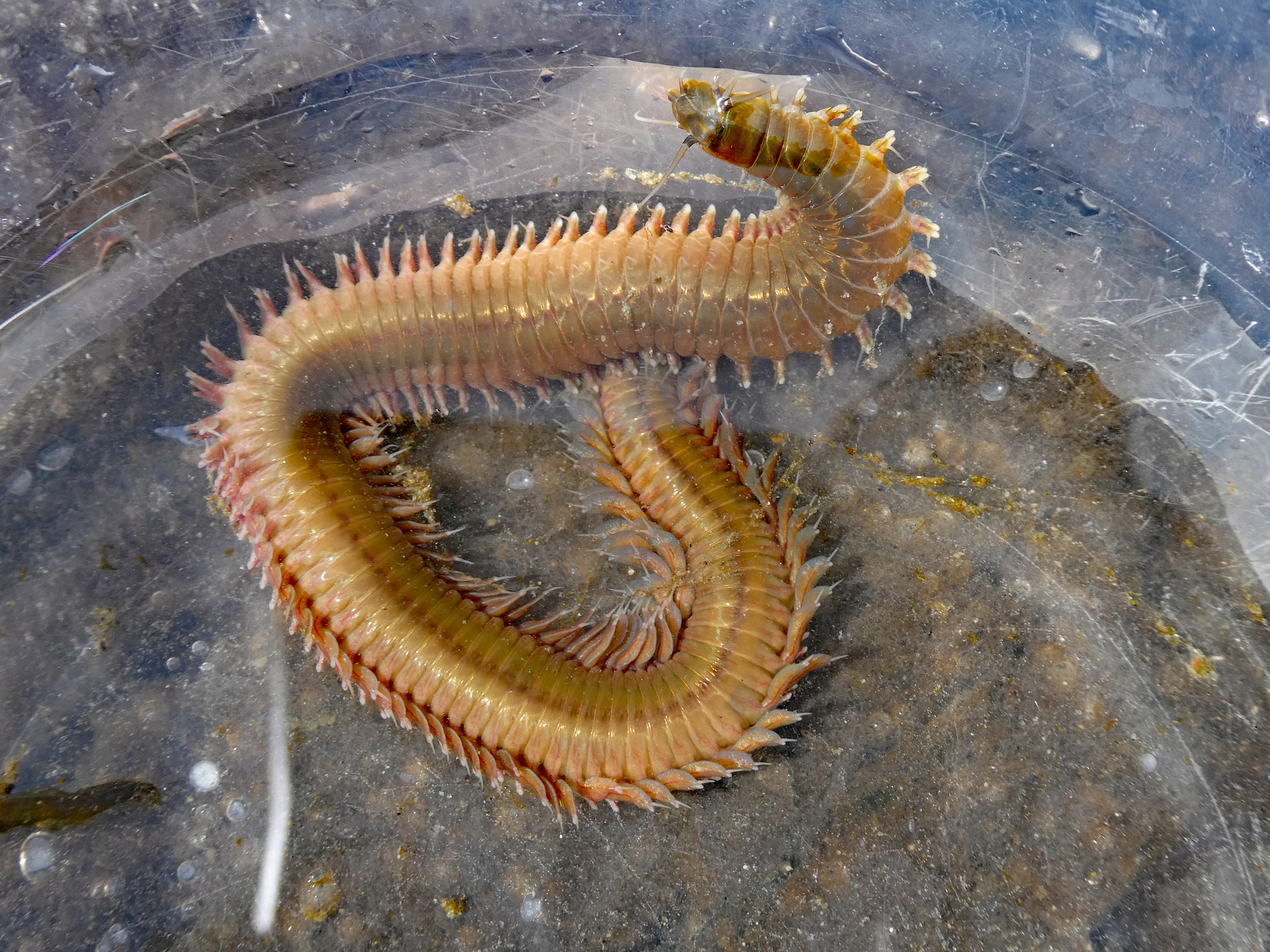
- Nereis vexillosa observed in Campbell River, British Columbia.

Scientific classification
- Kingdom: Animalia
- Phylum: Annelida
- Clade: Pleistoannelida
- Subclass: Errantia
- Order: Phyllodocida
- Family: Nereididae
- Genus: Nereis
- Species: N. vexillosa

Binomial name
- Nereis vexillosa Grube 1851

= Nereis vexillosa =

Species of annelid worm

Nereis vexillosa, the mussel worm, belongs to the phylum Annelida, a group known as the segmented worms. It is generally iridescent green and can reach 30 cm in length. It can be distinguished by the size of the upper ligules on the notopodia of the posterior region of the body. The upper ligules are much larger than the lower ligules. It is also without a collar-like structure around the peristomium.

== Habitat ==
Sand or rocks in intertidal and shallow marine waters.

== Range ==
Pacific Ocean from eastern Siberia to western North America as far south as Santa Barbara, California. Also found in Southern Africa.

== Behavior ==
Nereis vexillosa is often found in burrows in the sand or in association with mussels and barnacles. Although it has an eversible proboscis that it uses for prey capture, N. vexillosa also feeds on algae which it attaches to the opening of its burrow. The algae also serve to regulate temperature, moisture and salinity during low tide.

== Reproduction ==
At sexual maturity, N. vexillosa’s body is transformed into a heteronereid or epitoke. This body form is full of gametes and its sole purpose is reproduction. Epitokous worms leave their burrows and enter the water column in spawning swarms. This spawning activity marks the end of the organism's life cycle.

== Importance ==
Nereis vexillosa is an important food item for foraging birds in the intertidal zone. The habit of algal attachment to its burrow facilitates the colonization of the alga.
