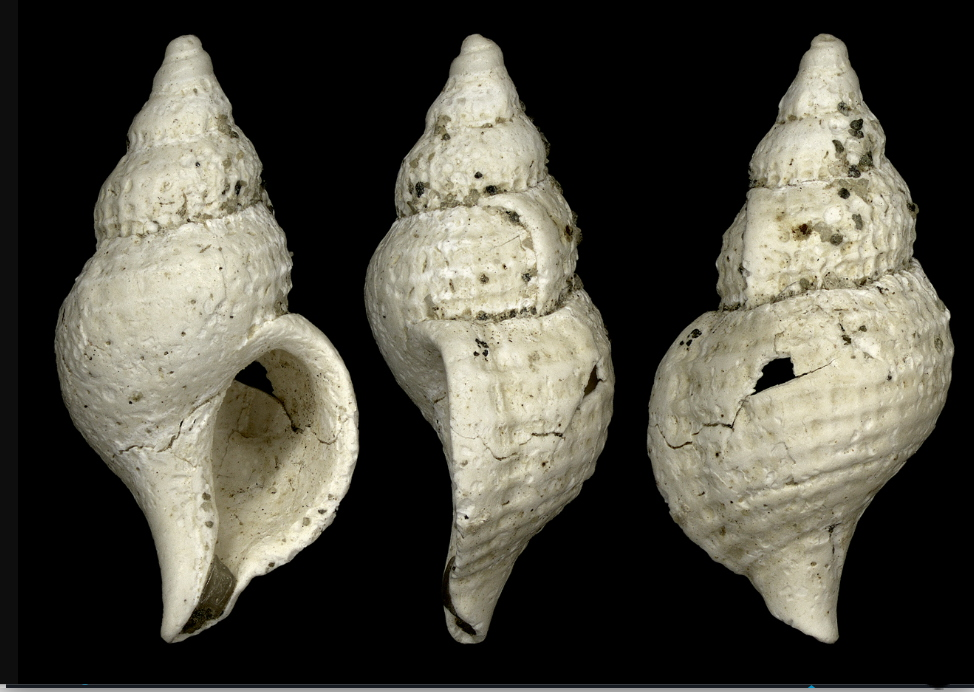
- Shell of Urosalpinx ortmanni (specimen at MNHN, Paris)

Scientific classification
- Kingdom: Animalia
- Phylum: Mollusca
- Class: Gastropoda
- Subclass: Caenogastropoda
- Order: Neogastropoda
- Family: Muricidae
- Subfamily: Ocenebrinae
- Genus: Urosalpinx
- Species: †U. ortmanni

Binomial name
- †Urosalpinx ortmanni Ihering 1907

Synonyms
- Urosalpinx leucostomoides (Sowerby in Darwin, 1878)

= Urosalpinx ortmanni =

Species of gastropod

Urosalpinx ortmanni is an extinct species of sea snail, a marine gastropod mollusk in the family Muricidae, the murex snails or rock snails.

== Description ==
This species resembles † Urosalpinx archipatagonica Ihering 1907, found at the same location.

== Distribution ==
Fossils were found in Early Miocene strata of Patagonia, Argentina (age range: 23.03 to 15.97 Ma).
