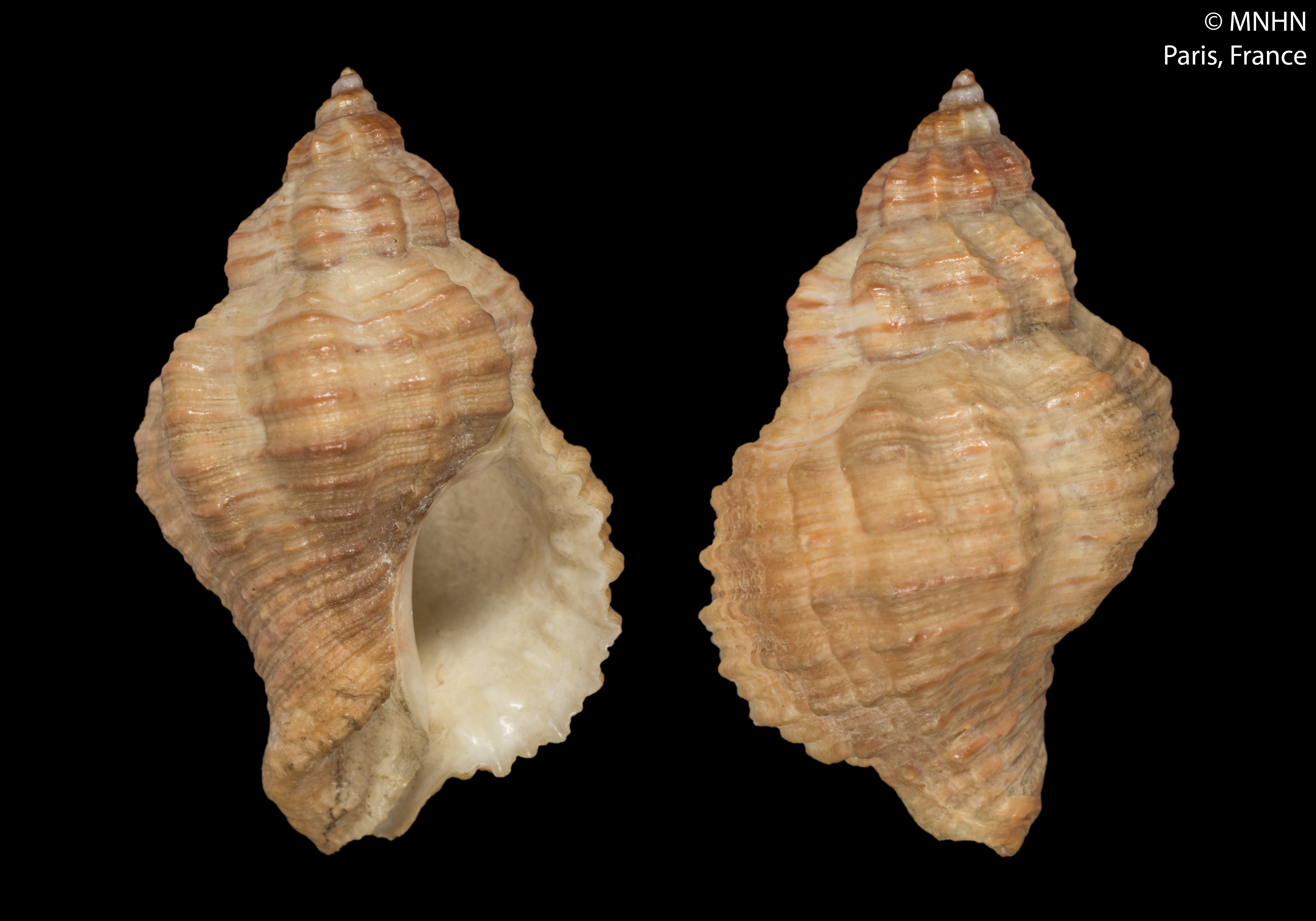
- Shell of Urosalpinx haneti

Scientific classification
- Domain: Eukaryota
- Kingdom: Animalia
- Phylum: Mollusca
- Class: Gastropoda
- Subclass: Caenogastropoda
- Order: Neogastropoda
- Superfamily: Muricoidea
- Family: Muricidae
- Subfamily: Ocenebrinae
- Genus: Urosalpinx; Stimpson, 1865

Synonyms
- Hanetia Jousseaume, 1880; Zulloia Petuch 1994

= Urosalpinx =

Genus of gastropods

Urosalpinx is a genus of sea snails, marine gastropods in the subfamily Ocenebrinae of the murex snail family, Muricidae.

== Description ==
The shell is elongated oval, or short fusiform, longitudinally ribbed or undulated and spirally striated. The aperture has a short siphonal canal. The outer lip is dentate and lirate within. The operculum is somewhat like that of Purpura, semicordate, with the nucleus at the outer edge a little below the middle. Lingual dentition nearly like that of Trophon, the lateral teeth having an elongated base of attachment but the rhachidian tooth has numerous minute denticles between the principal ones, corresponding to ridges on the surface of the tooth, as in the Murices. Ova-capsules are oblong, shouldered, widest near the summit, compressed, carinated on either side peduncle short. The base of the attachment is very small. The aperture is median at the summit.

== Species ==
- † Urosalpinx archipatagonica Ihering 1907
- † Urosalpinx aspinosus (Meyer, 1886 )
- † Urosalpinx auroraensis E.J. Petuch, 1994
- † Urosalpinx baudoni (Morlet, 1888)
- † Urosalpinx boggsi H.A. Pilsbry & A.A. Olsson, 1941
- Urosalpinx cala (Pilsbry, 1897)
- Urosalpinx cinerea (Say, 1822)
- † Urosalpinx coombsi Durham 1944
- † Urosalpinx cossmanni A.E. Ortmann, 1900
- † Urosalpinx curtansata R. Tate, 1888
- † Urosalpinx cymioides H.A. Pilsbry & A.A. Olsson, 1941
- † Urosalpinx dalli (J. Brown & H.A. Pilsbry, 1911)
- † Urosalpinx dautzembergi (Ihering, 1897)
- Urosalpinx devriesi Houart & Sellanes, 2017
- † Urosalpinx ecuadorensis H.A. Pilsbry & A.A. Olsson, 1941
- † Urosalpinx gilmorei E.J. Petuch, 1994
- Urosalpinx haneti (Petit de la Saussaye, 1856)
- † Urosalpinx kirbyi Clark 1938
- Urosalpinx lancellottii Houart & Sellanes, 2017
- Urosalpinx macra A.E. Verrill, 1884 (nomen dubium)
- † Urosalpinx mengeana W.H. Dall, 1890
- † Urosalpinx miamiensis E.J. Petuch, 1994
- † Urosalpinx ortmanni Ihering,1907
- † Urosalpinx rucksorum E.J. Petuch, 1994
- † Urosalpinx rusticus (T.A. Conrad, 1839)
- Urosalpinx stimpsoni Dall, 1927
- Urosalpinx subangulata (Stearns, 1873)
- † Urosalpinx subrusticus d'Orbigny 1852
- † Urosalpinx trossula (Conrad, 1832)
- Urosalpinx verrilli Dall, 1927

Species brought into synonymy

- Urosalpinx badia (A. Adams, 1863): synonym of Searlesia badia (A. Adams, 1863)
- Urosalpinx bandana Schepman, 1911: synonym of Ergalatax contracta (Reeve, 1846)
- † Urosalpinx bonneti Cossmann, 1913: synonym of † Trophonopsis bonneti (Cossmann, 1913) (superseded combination)
- Urosalpinx carolinensis A. E. Verrill, 1884: synonym of Mohnia carolinensis (A. E. Verrill, 1884) (original combination)
- Urosalpinx cinereus (Say, 1822): synonym of Urosalpinx cinerea (Say, 1822) (incorrect grammatical agreement of specific epithet)
- Urosalpinx circumtexta (Stearns, 1871): synonym of Paciocinebrina circumtexta (Stearns, 1871)
- † Urosalpinx cuisense Cossmann, 1913: synonym of † Trophonopsis cuisensis (Cossmann, 1913) (superseded combination)
- † Urosalpinx defossum (Pilkington, 1804): synonym of † Trophonopsis sublamellosa (Deshayes, 1835)
- Urosalpinx floridana Conrad, 1869: synonym of Calotrophon ostrearum (Conrad, 1846)
- Urosalpinx fusulus (Brocchi, 1814): synonym of Orania fusulus (Brocchi, 1814)
- Urosalpinx grippi (Dall, 1911): synonym of Paciocinebrina grippi (Dall, 1911)
- Urosalpinx heptagonalis (Reeve, 1846): synonym of Ergalatax heptagonalis (Reeve, 1846)
- Urosalpinx hupeanus Ihering, 1907: synonym of Fuegotrophon pallidus (Broderip, 1833)
- Urosalpinx innotabilis E. A. Smith, 1879: synonym of Ergalatax contracta (Reeve, 1846)
- Urosalpinx perrugata (Conrad, 1846): synonym of Vokesinotus perrugatus (Conrad, 1846) ( combination)
- Urosalpinx rushi [sic]: synonym of Urosalpinx haneti (Petit de la Saussaye, 1856) (misspelling)
- Urosalpinx rushii Pilsbry, 1897: synonym of Urosalpinx haneti (Petit de la Saussaye, 1856)
- Urosalpinx scrobiculata (Dunker, 1846) : synonym of Vaughtia scrobiculata (Dunker, 1846)
- Urosalpinx smithi Schepman, 1911: synonym of Ergalatax contracta (Reeve, 1846)
- Urosalpinx sperata (Cossmann, 1921): synonym of Gracilipurpura sperata (Cossmann, 1921)
- Urosalpinx subsinuatus (Maltzan, 1884): synonym of Trachypollia turricula (Maltzan, 1884)
- Urosalpinx tampaensis (Conrad, 1846): synonym of Eupleura tampaensis (Conrad, 1846)
- Urosalpinx walkeri G. B. Sowerby III, 1908: synonym of Orania walkeri (G. B. Sowerby III, 1908) (original combination)
