= Solenosteira =

Scientific classification
- Kingdom: Animalia
- Phylum: Mollusca
- Class: Gastropoda
- Subclass: Caenogastropoda
- Order: Neogastropoda
- Superfamily: Buccinoidea
- Family: Pisaniidae
- Genus: Solenosteira; W.H. Dall, 1890

Synonyms
- Solen (Solen) Linnaeus, 1758· accepted, alternate representation

Genus of gastropods

Solenosteira is a genus of sea snails, marine gastropod molluscs in the family Pisaniidae.

== Species ==
Species within the genus Solenosteira include:

- Solenosteira anomala (Reeve, 1846)
- Solenosteira cancellaria (Conrad, 1846)
- Solenosteira capitanea Berry, 1957
- Solenosteira fusiformis (Blainville, 1832)
- Solenosteira gatesi Berry, 1963
- Solenosteira macrospira (Berry, 1957)
- Solenosteira mendozana (Berry, 1959)
- Solenosteira pallida (Broderip & G. B. Sowerby I, 1829)
- † Solenosteira subcarinata (Lamarck, 1803)

Synonyms

- Solenosteira elegans Dall, 1908: synonym of Hesperisternia elegans (Dall, 1908) (original combination)
- † Solenosteira mengeana Dall, 1890: synonym of † Urosalpinx mengeana W.H. Dall, 1890

Taxa inquirenda

- † Solenosteira cochlearis Guppy, 1911
- † Solenosteira semiglobosa Guppy, 1911
