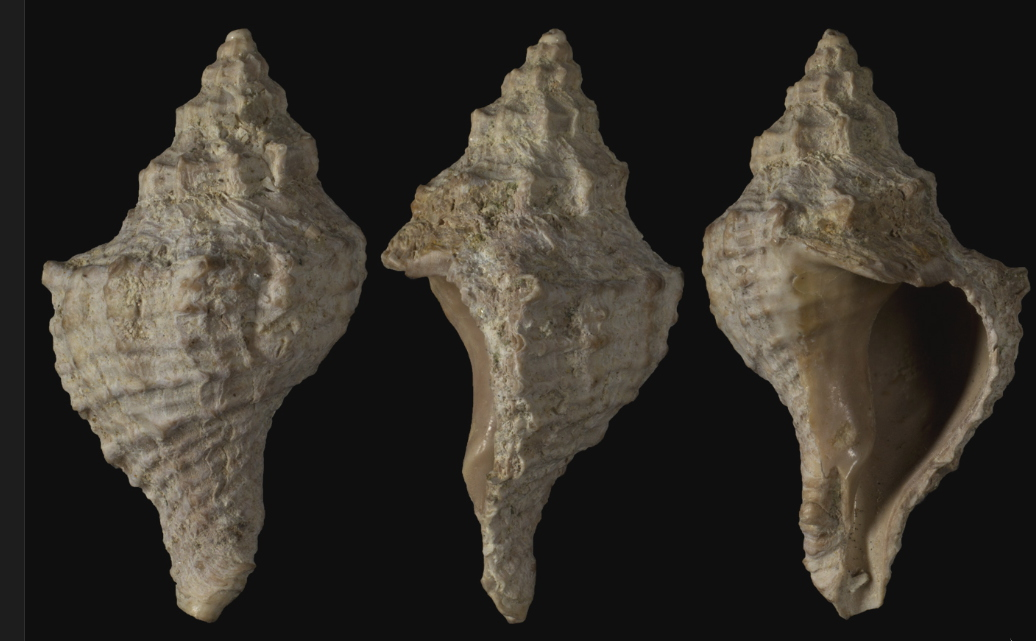
- Shell of Urosalpinx baudoni (specimen at MNHN, Paris)

Scientific classification
- Kingdom: Animalia
- Phylum: Mollusca
- Class: Gastropoda
- Subclass: Caenogastropoda
- Order: Neogastropoda
- Family: Muricidae
- Subfamily: Ocenebrinae
- Genus: Urosalpinx
- Species: †U. baudoni

Binomial name
- †Urosalpinx baudoni (Morlet, 1888)

Synonyms
- † Murex baudoni Morlet, 1888 ·

= Urosalpinx baudoni =

Species of gastropod

Urosalpinx baudoni is an extinct species of sea snail, a marine gastropod mollusk in the family Muricidae, the murex snails or rock snails.

== Distribution ==
Fossils were found in Eocene strata of Paris Basin, France.
