= Urosalpinx cossmanni =

Scientific classification
- Kingdom: Animalia
- Phylum: Mollusca
- Class: Gastropoda
- Subclass: Caenogastropoda
- Order: Neogastropoda
- Family: Muricidae
- Subfamily: Ocenebrinae
- Genus: Urosalpinx
- Species: †U. cossmanni

Binomial name
- †Urosalpinx cossmanni Ortmann 1900

Synonyms
- Odontostomia leucostomoides Cossmann, non Sowerby

Species of gastropod

Urosalpinx cossmanni is an extinct species of sea snail, a marine gastropod mollusk in the family Muricidae, the murex snails or rock snails.

== Distribution ==
Fossils were found in Miocene and Oligocene strata of Argentina (age range: 23.03 to 15.97 Ma).
