= Urosalpinx subrusticus =

Scientific classification
- Kingdom: Animalia
- Phylum: Mollusca
- Class: Gastropoda
- Subclass: Caenogastropoda
- Order: Neogastropoda
- Family: Muricidae
- Subfamily: Ocenebrinae
- Genus: Urosalpinx
- Species: †U. subrusticus

Binomial name
- †Urosalpinx subrusticus (d'Orbigny 1852)

Synonyms
- Fusus subrusticus d'Orbigny 1852

Species of gastropod

Urosalpinx subrusticus is an extinct species of sea snail, a marine gastropod mollusk in the family Muricidae, the murex snails or rock snails.

== Description ==
The length of the shell attains 33 mm.

== Distribution ==
Fossils were found in Miocene strata of Maryland, USA (age range: 20.43 to 7.246 Ma)
