= Urosalpinx cala =

Scientific classification
- Kingdom: Animalia
- Phylum: Mollusca
- Class: Gastropoda
- Subclass: Caenogastropoda
- Order: Neogastropoda
- Family: Muricidae
- Subfamily: Ocenebrinae
- Genus: Urosalpinx
- Species: U. cala

Binomial name
- Urosalpinx cala (Pilsbry, 1897)

Synonyms
- Ocenebra cala (Pilsbry, 1897); Ocinebra cala Pilsbry, 1897

Species of gastropod

Urosalpinx cala is a species of sea snail, a marine gastropod mollusk in the family Muricidae, the murex snails or rock snails.

== Description ==
The length of the shell attains 5.8 mm, its maximum diameter 5.8 mm.

Original description:

The fusiform shell is solid and thick. It is of a dirty white color. It contains fully 6½ or 7 convex whorls.

Sculpture: prominent longitudinal folds, which are strong but rounded and wavelike, the intervals like the folds reversed. They number 9 to 10 on the body whorl, and about the same number on the preceding whorl. These are crossed by rounded spiral threads which are somewhat lamellose from the fine growth-strise. There are about 13 or 14 principal spirals, but in the region of the periphery five or six of the intervals are occupied by minor threads.

The aperture measures one-half the total length of shell. The aperture is small, long-oval. Passing below into a very narrow, parallel-sided siphonal canal nearly as long as the open oval portion. The outer lip is thickened and 7-toothed within. The siphonal fasciole is conspicuous, convex and leaving a narrow umbilical chink.

== Distribution ==
This marine species occurs off Uruguay
