= Urosalpinx stimpsoni =

Scientific classification
- Kingdom: Animalia
- Phylum: Mollusca
- Class: Gastropoda
- Subclass: Caenogastropoda
- Order: Neogastropoda
- Family: Muricidae
- Subfamily: Ocenebrinae
- Genus: Urosalpinx
- Species: U. stimpsoni

Binomial name
- Urosalpinx stimpsoni Dall, 1927

Species of gastropod

Urosalpinx stimpsoni is a species of sea snail, a marine gastropod mollusk in the family Muricidae, the murex snails or rock snails.

== Description ==
The length of shell attains 10 mm; of the aperture and siphonal canal, 4.5 mm; maximum diameter, 6 mm.

(Original description) The small, fusiform shell is, white, with an inflated, smooth white protoconch of 1½ whorls and nearly four subsequent whorls. The is distinct and rather deep. The whorls are well rounded. The early whorls are more or less distinctly ribbed with about 16 rounded ribs on the penultimate whorl, obsolete on the body whorl, with more or less obvious close incremental lines. The spiral sculpture consists of (on the penultimate whorl 6; on the body whorl about 20) equal and equally distributed cords with usually wider interspaces in each of which runs a fine intercalary thread. This sculpture covers the whole whorl. The aperture is sublunate. The outer lip is thin, sharp and crenulate by the sculpture. The body is lightly erased. The columella is smooth and twisted. The siphonal canal is short and slightly recurved. The axis is pervious.

== Distribution ==
This marine species occurs off Georgia, USA.
