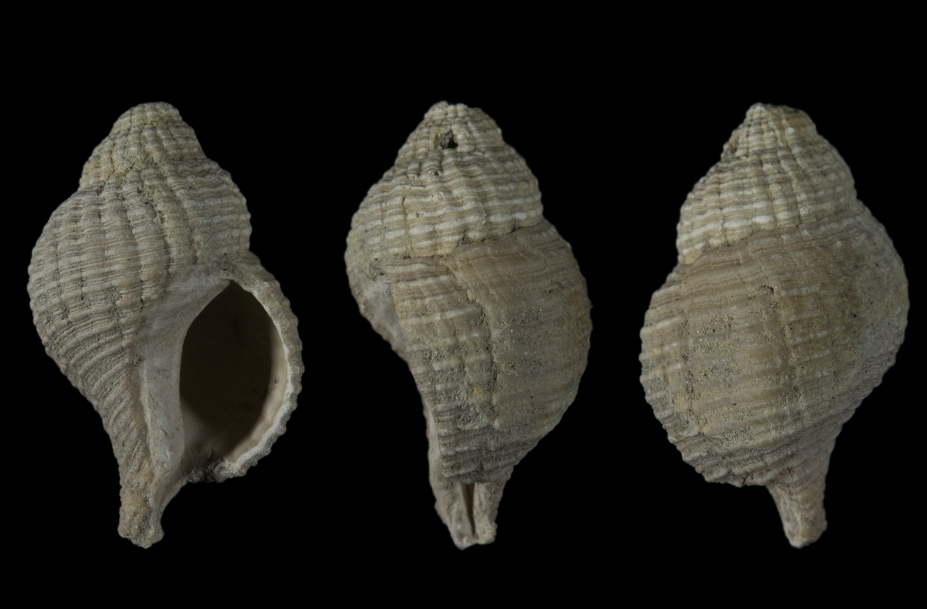
- Shell of Urosalpinx trossula (specimen at MNHN, Paris)

Scientific classification
- Kingdom: Animalia
- Phylum: Mollusca
- Class: Gastropoda
- Subclass: Caenogastropoda
- Order: Neogastropoda
- Family: Muricidae
- Subfamily: Ocenebrinae
- Genus: Urosalpinx
- Species: †U. trossula

Binomial name
- †Urosalpinx trossula (Conrad, 1832)

Synonyms
- † Trossulasalpinx trossulus (T.A. Conrad, 1832)

= Urosalpinx trossula =

Species of gastropod

Urosalpinx trossula is an extinct species of sea snail, a marine gastropod mollusk in the family Muricidae, the murex snails or rock snails.

== Distribution ==
Fossils were found in Miocene strata of Virginia, USA.
