= Urosalpinx aspinosus =

Scientific classification
- Kingdom: Animalia
- Phylum: Mollusca
- Class: Gastropoda
- Subclass: Caenogastropoda
- Order: Neogastropoda
- Family: Muricidae
- Subfamily: Ocenebrinae
- Genus: Urosalpinx
- Species: †U. aspinosus

Binomial name
- †Urosalpinx aspinosus (Meyer, 1886)

Species of gastropod

Urosalpinx aspinosus is an extinct species of sea snail, a marine gastropod mollusk belonging to the family Muricidae, which includes murex snails or rock snails.

== Description ==
The length of the shell attains 10 mm.

== Distribution ==
Fossils were found in Oligocene strata of Mississippi, USA.
