= Urosalpinx rusticus =

Scientific classification
- Kingdom: Animalia
- Phylum: Mollusca
- Class: Gastropoda
- Subclass: Caenogastropoda
- Order: Neogastropoda
- Family: Muricidae
- Subfamily: Ocenebrinae
- Genus: Urosalpinx
- Species: †U. rusticus

Binomial name
- †Urosalpinx rusticus (T.A. Conrad, 1839)

Synonyms
- Fusus rusticus T.A. Conrad, 1839

Species of gastropod

Urosalpinx rusticus is an extinct species of sea snail, a marine gastropod mollusk in the family Muricidae, the murex snails or rock snails.

== Description ==
The length of the shell attains 42 mm.

== Distribution ==
Fossils were found in Miocene strata of Virginia and Maryland, USA (age range: 11.608 to 5.332 Ma).
