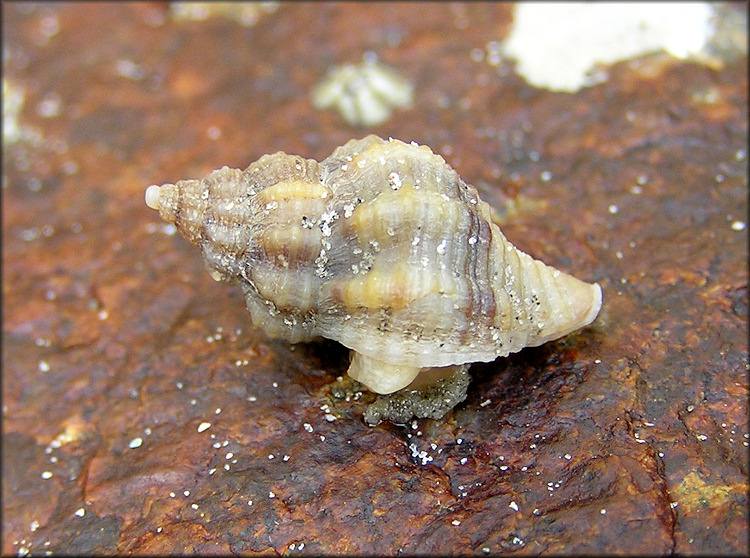

Scientific classification
- Kingdom: Animalia
- Phylum: Mollusca
- Class: Gastropoda
- Subclass: Caenogastropoda
- Order: Neogastropoda
- Family: Muricidae
- Subfamily: Ocenebrinae
- Genus: Urosalpinx
- Species: U. cinerea

Binomial name
- Urosalpinx cinerea (Say, 1822)

Synonyms
- Fusus cinereus Say, 1822; Urosalpinx cinerea var. follyensis B. B. Baker, 1951; Urosalpinx cinereus (Say, 1822) incorrect grammatical agreement of specific epithet; Urosalpinx cinereus var. follyensis B. B. Baker, 1951

= Urosalpinx cinerea =

Atlantic oyster drill

Species of gastropod

Urosalpinx cinerea, common name the eastern oyster drill, Atlantic oyster drill, or just oyster drill, is a species of small predatory sea snail, a marine gastropod mollusk in the family Muricidae, the murexes or rock snails.

This snail uses chemoreception to locate its invertebrate prey, which is typically a sessile or encrusting organism that is unable to escape its pursuer. The chemoreception hunting strategy involves detecting microscopic particles that its prey releases into the sea water.

The Atlantic oyster drill is a serious problem in commercial oyster beds, and it has been accidentally introduced well outside its natural range.

== Distribution ==
This snail is endemic to the Atlantic coast of North America, from Nova Scotia to Nassau Sound in Florida. It has been accidentally introduced with oyster spat to Northern Europe and to the West Coast of North America from California to Washington. They occupy areas in which salinity and temperature fluctuates both seasonally and with the tidal currents.

== Description ==
The shell is usually light brown or yellowish, rarely with several revolving, indistinct, rufous bands. Within the aperture varying from light flesh-color to dark salmon, chocolate or purple.

The fusiform shell is solid and thick and has a sharply pointed apex.

This animal is not physically able to close itself from its surrounding environment because of its siphonal canal.

Sculpture: prominent broad ribs and numerous longitudinal folds, which are strong but rounded and wavelike, the intervals like the folds reversed. The aperture measures one-half the total length of shell. The aperture is long-oval, passing below into a short, open siphonal canal. The outer lip is thin.

The animal is small, the foot scarcely covering the aperture, very little dilated at the front angles, cream-colored, margined with lemon color beneath, punctured with light drab above. The siphon merely surpasses the tip of the siphonal canal. The head is scarcely protruded; tentaeula nearly united at origin; eyes black, at the outer upper third of tentacula, which third is a mere filament, are contractile. The motions of the shell are sluggish.

The eggs of Urosalpinx cinerea are contained in small transparent membranous parchment-like vases, each of which is attached by an expanded foot to some solid substance, usually the under surface of an overhanging rock, a little above low-tide mark. Each female deposits from ten or twelve to more than a hundred of these vases, the process of laying occupying several weeks. The vases are generally attached in more or less regular rows, covering sometimes an area of three or four square inches. In shape and size they are like the egg-cases of Purpura, but without the slight reddish tinge of the latter. They are flattened vertically, and their edges are marked by keel-like ridges. Owing to the lengthened period of oviposition, eggs and embryos in all stages of development are to be found in the various vases of a group, and the young escape from the firstlaid vases before the female has finished laying. Unlike the vases of Purpura, each of which contains several hundred eggs, those of Urosalpinx contain only from six to twenty, ten or twelve being the usual number. All of these normally undergo development, and give rise to embryos. Occasionally a partially segmented egg or more advanced embryo becomes abortive and breaks up into separate cells, each of which remains alive for some time, and often swims actively by the motion of its cilia. These cosmelae and the yolk of the aborted eggs are drawn into the digestive cavities of other embryos, but this method of furnishing the young with food is exceptional and accidental.

== Habitat ==
This species lives from low tide down to a depth of 25 feet. Its surroundings are rocky and shell beds. It inhabits the lower third of the littoral zone, therefore it is sheltered from any waves the ocean produces.

== Life habits ==
As indicated by its common name, the eastern oyster drill uses its radula to drill through the shells of living invertebrates to consume them. It hunts via chemoreception, primarily in intertidal areas. It predates on many different species of invertebrates, particularly oysters and barnacles, though Urosalpinx cinerea has been observed feeding on mussels, limpets, clams, small crabs, and even displays cannabalism.

They range in size, but male and female oyster drills average 24 millimeters and 28 millimeters, respectively. Almost all Atlantic oyster drills reach their largest size after two full growing seasons, and about 70% of their size is reached within this time span. In the next four or so years to come, there is little or no increase in size. Although some females possess a small vestigial formation that may look like a penis, other parts are used to confirm the sex. Finding the egg capsule gland, ovary, and any sperm ingesting glands makes it easier to identify the oyster drill as a female.

== Human relevance ==
Due to their ability of "drilling" into shells, the snail's activities can cost millions of dollars every single year. It is a serious problem in commercial oyster farming:

"Next to the sea star, this snail is the worst enemy the [oyster fisher men] have to contend with. [...] Settling upon a young bivalve, the oyster drill quickly bores a neat round hole through a valve, making expert use of its sandpaperlike radula. Through this perforation the oyster drill is able to insert its long proboscis and consume the soft parts of the oyster."

Advocates of making use of bycatch, rather than discarding it, have promoted the oyster drill as a food, similar to escargot.
