= Urosalpinx macra =

Scientific classification
- Kingdom: Animalia
- Phylum: Mollusca
- Class: Gastropoda
- Subclass: Caenogastropoda
- Order: Neogastropoda
- Family: Muricidae
- Subfamily: Ocenebrinae
- Genus: Urosalpinx
- Species: U. macra

Binomial name
- Urosalpinx macra A. E. Verrill, 1884

Species of gastropod

Urosalpinx macra is a species of sea snail, a marine gastropod mollusk in the family Muricidae, the murex snails or rock snails.

This is a nomen dubium (Buccinidae ?)

== Description ==
(Original description) The shell is nearly regularly fusiform, consisting of seven whorls, separated by an impressed suture. The spire is somewhat elongated, regularly tapered, and forms one-half the length of the shell. The protoconch is mamilliform, consisting of about two regularly coiled, convex, rounded whorls, of which the first is nearly as large as the second. The lower whorls are crossed by about ten broad, strongly marked, nodulous ribs. The spiral sculpture consists of stout, rounded, rather elevated, revolving cinguli, which rise into oblong nodules or tubercles in crossing the ribs. Of these there are about eight on the body whorl, besides five or six on the siphon without nodules. On the penultimate whorl there are five or six primary cinguli, of which two or three around the periphery are considerably larger and farther apart than the others. One, below these, is coincident with the suture and makes it undulating. Between the primary cinguli there are three to five much smaller rounded cinguli, separated by thin, incised grooves. These cinguli are about equally prominent on the ribs and interspaces and do not form nodules. The surface is also covered with fine, close, raised lines of growth, except on the nodules, which are smooth at summit. The aperture is ovate, continued anteriorly in a rather long, narrow siphonal canal, and having a slight posterior notch or sinus at the suture. The outer lip is sharp and regularly arched. The inner lip is strongly excavated, its curvature posteriorly being greater than that of the outer lip. The columella is rather elongated, straight, with a somewhat sinuous inner margin. The siphonal canal is straight, somewhat elongated and constricted. The color of the shell is yellowish white, its interior grayish white.

== Distribution ==
This marine species occurs off Cape Hatteras to Florida.
