= H. polymorpha =

H. polymorpha may refer to:

- Hansenula polymorpha, a methylotrophic yeast
- Hedypnois polymorpha, a dandelion native to areas from Canary Islands to Iran
- Heterolocha polymorpha, a geometer moth
- Heteropurpura polymorpha, a sea snail
- Hydra polymorpha, an athecate hydroid
- Hydrostachys polymorpha, an aquatic plant
- Hymenachne polymorpha, a true grass
- Hyphomonas polymorpha, a psychrophilic bacterium
- Hypoestes polymorpha, a Paleotropical plant
