= Urosalpinx kirbyi =

Scientific classification
- Kingdom: Animalia
- Phylum: Mollusca
- Class: Gastropoda
- Subclass: Caenogastropoda
- Order: Neogastropoda
- Family: Muricidae
- Subfamily: Ocenebrinae
- Genus: Urosalpinx
- Species: †U. kirbyi

Binomial name
- †Urosalpinx kirbyi B. L. Clark 1938

Species of gastropod

Urosalpinx kirbyi is an extinct species of sea snail, a marine gastropod mollusk in the family Muricidae, the murex snails or rock snails.

== Distribution ==
Fossils were found in Eocene strata in California, USA (age range:48.6 to 37.2 Ma).
