= Urosalpinx lancellottii =

Scientific classification
- Kingdom: Animalia
- Phylum: Mollusca
- Class: Gastropoda
- Subclass: Caenogastropoda
- Order: Neogastropoda
- Family: Muricidae
- Subfamily: Ocenebrinae
- Genus: Urosalpinx
- Species: U. lancellottii

Binomial name
- Urosalpinx lancellottii Houart & Sellanes, 2017

Species of gastropod

Urosalpinx lancellottii is a species of sea snail, a marine gastropod mollusk in the family Muricidae, the murex snails or rock snails.

== Distribution ==
This marine species occurs off Chile
