= Urosalpinx coombsi =

Scientific classification
- Kingdom: Animalia
- Phylum: Mollusca
- Class: Gastropoda
- Subclass: Caenogastropoda
- Order: Neogastropoda
- Family: Muricidae
- Subfamily: Ocenebrinae
- Genus: Urosalpinx
- Species: †U. coombsi

Binomial name
- †Urosalpinx coombsi Durham 1944

Species of gastropod

Urosalpinx coombsi is an extinct species of sea snail, a marine gastropod mollusk in the family Muricidae, the murex snails or rock snails.

== Distribution ==
Fossils were found in Eocene strata of Washington, UsA (age range: 37.2 to 33.9 Ma).
