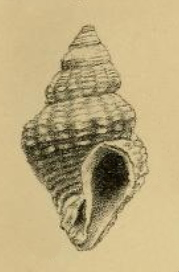
- Shell of Urosalpinx curtansata (holotype)

Scientific classification
- Kingdom: Animalia
- Phylum: Mollusca
- Class: Gastropoda
- Subclass: Caenogastropoda
- Order: Neogastropoda
- Family: Muricidae
- Subfamily: Ocenebrinae
- Genus: Urosalpinx
- Species: †U. curtansata

Binomial name
- †Urosalpinx curtansata (Tate 1888)

Synonyms
- Vitularia curtansata Tate, 1888

= Urosalpinx curtansata =

Species of gastropod

Urosalpinx curtansata is an extinct species of sea snail, a marine gastropod mollusk in the family Muricidae, the murex snails or rock snails.

== Description ==
Measurements of the shell: 12.0 x 8.0 mm.

(Original description) The shell is rather thin, biconical, ventricose and oval. It contains five whorls, rather convex, impressed at the suture. The body whorl is ventricose, gradually attenuated anteriorly into a short blunt siphonal canal. The spire whorls are ornamented with about six stout, rounded, scaly, spiral ribs, that next but one to the anterior suture a little stouter than the rest, and producing a slight angulation of the whorl. The alternating furrows are deep, and narrower than the ribs. The transverse ornament consists of about 10 inconspicuous plications. The body whorl shows about 20 unequal spiral ribs. The aperture is pyriform, straight. The peristome is thinly continuous. The inner lip is patulous, slightly arched to the origin of the straight columella, with a thin edge parting the aperture from the umbilical fissure. The outer lip is smooth within. The siphonal canal is very short, wide and truncated.

== Distribution ==
Fossils were found in Miocene strata of Victoria, Australia (age range:15.97 to 11.608 Ma).
