= Monoceros (disambiguation) =

Monoceros is a constellation on the celestial equator.

Monoceros may also refer to:

- Monoceros (legendary creature), a legendary unicorn-like creature
- Monoceros (album), 1978 album by Evan Parker
- Monoceros, a junior synonym for the sea snail genus Chorus
- Monodon monoceros, the binomial name for narwhals
