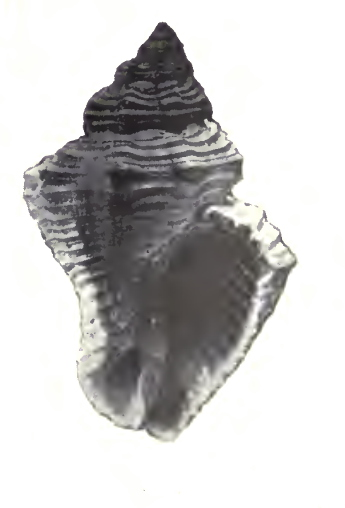
- Shell of Urosalpinx dalli (holotype)

Scientific classification
- Kingdom: Animalia
- Phylum: Mollusca
- Class: Gastropoda
- Subclass: Caenogastropoda
- Order: Neogastropoda
- Family: Muricidae
- Subfamily: Ocenebrinae
- Genus: Urosalpinx
- Species: †U. dalli

Binomial name
- †Urosalpinx dalli (J. Brown & H.A. Pilsbry, 1911)

Synonyms
- † Cantharus dalli (J. Brown & H.A. Pilsbry, 1911); † Coralliophila gatunensis Toula 1911; † Coralliophila incerta Toula 1911; † Hanetia dalli (J. Brown & H.A. Pilsbry, 1911); † Solenosteira dalli J. Brown & H.A. Pilsbry, 1911 (original description)

= Urosalpinx dalli =

Species of gastropod

Urosalpinx dalli is an extinct species of sea snail, a marine gastropod mollusk in the family Muricidae, the murex snails or rock snails.

== Description ==
The length of the shell attains 41 mm, its maximum diameter 25 mm.

(Original description) The shell is biconic, solid and thick. The spire is conic, acuminate when perfect, with about 2½ smooth embryonic whorls, the following whorls very convex. Their sculpture consists of massive longitudinal folds not quite as wide as the intervals and sharp spiral cords. On the body whorl there are 8 or 9 short, high folds, narrower than the intervals, and somewhat pointed at the shoulder, and sharp spiral cords, the concave intervals of which bear several unequal spiral threads. There are 16 or 17 major spirals between the suture and the basal point of the outer lip, and 5 or 6 more small ones on the convex basal fasciole. The whole surface between the spirals is marked with fine growth striae. The body whorl is deeply concave below, expanded around the umbilicus, which is deep and funnel-shaped. The aperture is as in the type of the genus, except that there is no posterior channel, merely an angle. The outer lip is deeply sulcate within, with a crenulate edge. The columella is nearly straight. The parietal callus is thin, with raised edge and one or two small lirae near the posterior angle of the aperture.

== Distribution ==
Fossils were found in Miocene strata in the Gatún Formation, Panama; Miocene and Pliocene strata in Colombia (age range: 11.608 to 2.588 Ma)
