= Urosalpinx verrilli =

Scientific classification
- Kingdom: Animalia
- Phylum: Mollusca
- Class: Gastropoda
- Subclass: Caenogastropoda
- Order: Neogastropoda
- Family: Muricidae
- Subfamily: Ocenebrinae
- Genus: Urosalpinx
- Species: U. verrilli

Binomial name
- Urosalpinx verrilli Dall, 1927

Species of gastropod

Urosalpinx verrilli is a species of sea snail, a marine gastropod mollusk in the family Muricidae, the murex snails or rock snails.

== Description ==
The length of the shell attains 9 mm; of the aperture, 4.5 mm; maximum diameter, 4.5 mm.

(Original description) The small, white, fusiform shell has a smooth white protoconch of about one smooth small whorl followed by a second minutely reticulate whorl, on which the spiral threads are stronger, increasing in strength to the end of the protoconch. It is followed by three subsequent well rounded whorls. The suture is distinct and deep, not appressed. The axial sculpture consists of (on the body whorl about 15) narrow rounded ribs crossing the whorls, with wider interspaces. The incremental lines are fine even, closely adjacent, and of a silky texture. The ribs are obsolete on the base of the body whorl. The spiral sculpture consistsof (on the penultimate whorl 6; on the body whorl 11) equal and equally spaced rounded cords with subequal interspaces (in which occasionally some fine spiral striae occur) and 10 or more close-set simple cords on the base. The former are slightly swollen at their intersections with the ribs. The aperture is semilunate. The outer lip is thin, smooth internally, the body erased. The columella is short and twisted. The siphonal canal is short and recurved. The axis is impervious.

== Distribution ==
This marine species occurs off Georgia, USA.
