= Urosalpinx cymioides =

Scientific classification
- Kingdom: Animalia
- Phylum: Mollusca
- Class: Gastropoda
- Subclass: Caenogastropoda
- Order: Neogastropoda
- Family: Muricidae
- Subfamily: Ocenebrinae
- Genus: Urosalpinx
- Species: †U. cymioides

Binomial name
- †Urosalpinx cymioides H.A. Pilsbry & A.A. Olsson, 1941

Species of gastropod

Urosalpinx cymioides is an extinct species of sea snail, a marine gastropod mollusk in the family Muricidae, the murex snails or rock snails.

== Distribution ==
Fossils were found in Pliocene and Pleistocene strata of Ecuador.
