= Urosalpinx auroraensis =

Scientific classification
- Kingdom: Animalia
- Phylum: Mollusca
- Class: Gastropoda
- Subclass: Caenogastropoda
- Order: Neogastropoda
- Family: Muricidae
- Subfamily: Ocenebrinae
- Genus: Urosalpinx
- Species: †U. auroraensis

Binomial name
- †Urosalpinx auroraensis E.J. Petuch, 1994

Species of gastropod

Urosalpinx auroraensis is an extinct species of sea snail, a marine gastropod mollusk in the family Muricidae, the murex snails or rock snails.

== Description ==
The length of the shell attains 16.5 mm.

== Distribution ==
Fossils were found in Pleistocene strata of South Carolina, USA.
