= Austrotrophon pinnata =

Scientific classification
- Kingdom: Animalia
- Phylum: Mollusca
- Class: Gastropoda
- Subclass: Caenogastropoda
- Order: Neogastropoda
- Family: Muricidae
- Genus: Austrotrophon
- Species: A. pinnata

Binomial name
- Austrotrophon pinnata (Dall, 1902)

Synonyms
- Trophon pinnatus Dall, 1902

Species of gastropod

Austrotrophon pinnata is a species of sea snail, a marine gastropod mollusk in the family Muricidae, the murex snails or rock snails.
