= Chicocenebra gubbi =

Scientific classification
- Kingdom: Animalia
- Phylum: Mollusca
- Class: Gastropoda
- Subclass: Caenogastropoda
- Order: Neogastropoda
- Family: Muricidae
- Genus: Chicocenebra
- Species: C. gubbi

Binomial name
- Chicocenebra gubbi (Reeve, 1849)

Synonyms
- Chicoreus gubbi (Reeve, 1849); Murex gubbi Reeve, 1849

Species of gastropod

Chicocenebra gubbi, common name : Gubb's murex, is a species of sea snail, a marine gastropod mollusk in the family Muricidae, the murex snails or rock snails.

== Description ==
The shell size varies between 34 mm and 45 mm.

It is also described in the Conchologia Iconica: or, illustrations of the shells of molluscous animals as a:

Shell triangularly fusiform, contracted towards the base, whorls depressly concave round the upper part, transversly granosely striated and ridged, ridges irregularly nodolous, three-varicose, varices frondose, fronds narrow, irregular, a single middle one bifurcated, the uppermost frond much the larger, peculiary hooked; lip conpisciously toothed, cinder black, fulvous in front near the base, interior of the aperture bluish-white.

== Distribution ==
This species is distributed in the Atlantic Ocean along Angola and Senegal.
