= Urosalpinx archipatagonica =

Scientific classification
- Kingdom: Animalia
- Phylum: Mollusca
- Class: Gastropoda
- Subclass: Caenogastropoda
- Order: Neogastropoda
- Family: Muricidae
- Subfamily: Ocenebrinae
- Genus: Urosalpinx
- Species: †U. archipatagonica

Binomial name
- †Urosalpinx archipatagonica Ihering 1907

Synonyms
- Trophon leucostomoides

Species of gastropod

Urosalpinx archipatagonica is an extinct species of sea snail, a marine gastropod mollusk in the family Muricidae, the murex snails or rock snails.

== Distribution ==
Fossils were found in Miocene strata of Argentina (age range: 23.03 to 15.97 Ma).
