= Chicocenebra =

Scientific classification
- Kingdom: Animalia
- Phylum: Mollusca
- Class: Gastropoda
- Subclass: Caenogastropoda
- Order: Neogastropoda
- Family: Muricidae
- Subfamily: Ocenebrinae
- Genus: Chicocenebra; Bouchet & Houart, 1996

Genus of gastropods

Chicocenebra is a genus of sea snails, marine gastropod mollusks in the family Muricidae, the murex snails or rock snails.

== Species ==
Species within the genus Chicocenebra include:

- Chicocenebra gubbi (Reeve, 1849)
