= Ocenotrophon painei =

Scientific classification
- Kingdom: Animalia
- Phylum: Mollusca
- Class: Gastropoda
- Subclass: Caenogastropoda
- Order: Neogastropoda
- Family: Muricidae
- Genus: Ocenotrophon
- Species: O. painei

Binomial name
- Ocenotrophon painei (Dall, 1904)

Synonyms
- Murex painei Dall, 1904

Species of gastropod

Ocenotrophon painei is a species of sea snail, a marine gastropod mollusk in the family Muricidae, the murex snails or rock snails.
