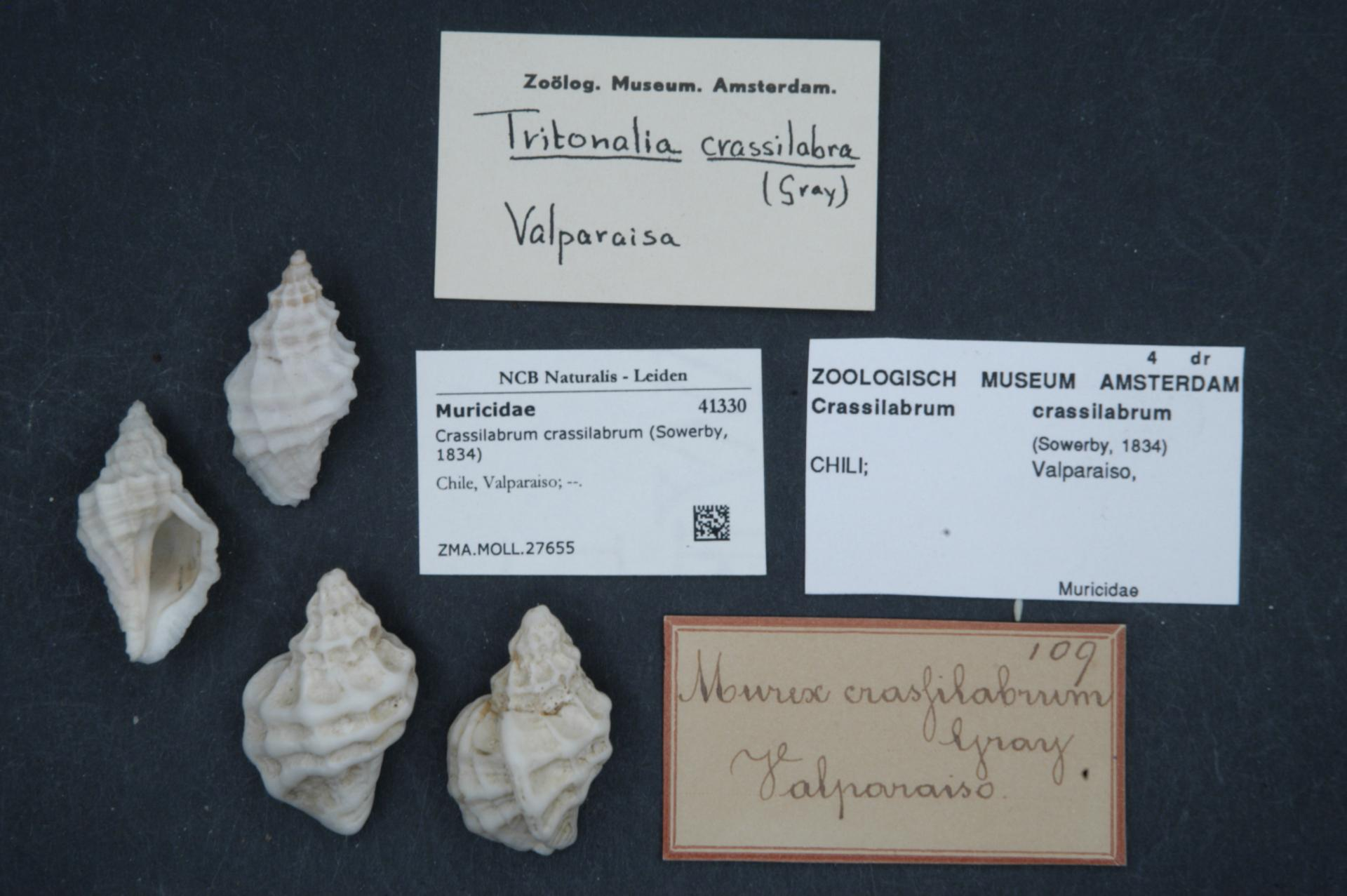
- Crassilabrum crassilabrum shells

Scientific classification
- Kingdom: Animalia
- Phylum: Mollusca
- Class: Gastropoda
- Subclass: Caenogastropoda
- Order: Neogastropoda
- Family: Muricidae
- Subfamily: Ocenebrinae
- Genus: Crassilabrum; Jousseaume, 1880

Synonyms
- Antimurex Cossmann, 1903

= Crassilabrum =

Genus of gastropods

Crassilabrum is a genus of sea snails, marine gastropod mollusks in the family Muricidae, the murex snails or rock snails.

== Species ==
Species within the genus Crassilabrum include:

- Crassilabrum crassilabrum (Sowerby, 1834)
