= Austrotrophon cerrosensis =

Scientific classification
- Kingdom: Animalia
- Phylum: Mollusca
- Class: Gastropoda
- Subclass: Caenogastropoda
- Order: Neogastropoda
- Family: Muricidae
- Genus: Austrotrophon
- Species: A. cerrosensis

Binomial name
- Austrotrophon cerrosensis (Dall, 1891)

Synonyms
- Trophon cerrosensis Dall, 1891

Species of gastropod

Austrotrophon cerrosensis is a species of sea snail, a marine gastropod mollusk in the family Muricidae, the murex snails or rock snails.
