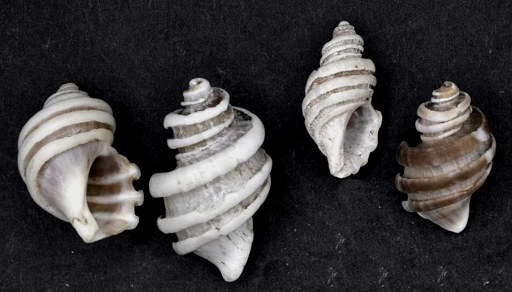
- Several shells of Trochia cingulata (museum specimens at Naturalis Biodiversity Center)

Scientific classification
- Kingdom: Animalia
- Phylum: Mollusca
- Class: Gastropoda
- Subclass: Caenogastropoda
- Order: Neogastropoda
- Family: Muricidae
- Genus: Trochia
- Species: T. cingulata

Binomial name
- Trochia cingulata (Linnaeus, 1771)

Synonyms
- Buccinum cingulatum Linnaeus, 1771 (original combination); Buccinum scala Gmelin, 1791; Buccinum trochlea Bruguiere, 1789; Nucella cingulata (Linnaeus, 1771); Purpura cingulata (Linnaeus, 1771); Purpura spiralis Reeve, 1846; Pyrum ergatum Humphrey, G., 1797; Stramonita cingulata (Linnaeus, 1771); Thais cingulata (Linnaeus, 1771)

= Trochia cingulata =

Species of gastropod

Trochia cingulata, common name : the girdled dogwhelk, is a species of sea snail, a marine gastropod mollusk in the family Muricidae, the murex snails or rock snails.

== Description ==
The shell size varies between 20 mm and 45 mm.

== Distribution ==
This species occurs in the Atlantic Ocean off Namibia and the West Coast of South Africa.
