= Calcitrapessa =

Scientific classification
- Kingdom: Animalia
- Phylum: Mollusca
- Class: Gastropoda
- Subclass: Caenogastropoda
- Order: Neogastropoda
- Superfamily: Muricoidea
- Family: Muricidae
- Subfamily: Ocenebrinae
- Genus: Calcitrapessa; Berry, 1959

Type species
- Murex (Chicoreus) leeanus Dall, 1890

Synonyms
- Pteropurpura (Calcitrapessa) Berry, 1959

Genus of gastropods

Calcitrapessa is a genus of predatory sea snails, marine gastropod mollusks in the subfamily Ocenebrinae of the family Muricidae, the murex and rock snails.

== Species ==
- Calcitrapessa leeana (Dall, 1890)
