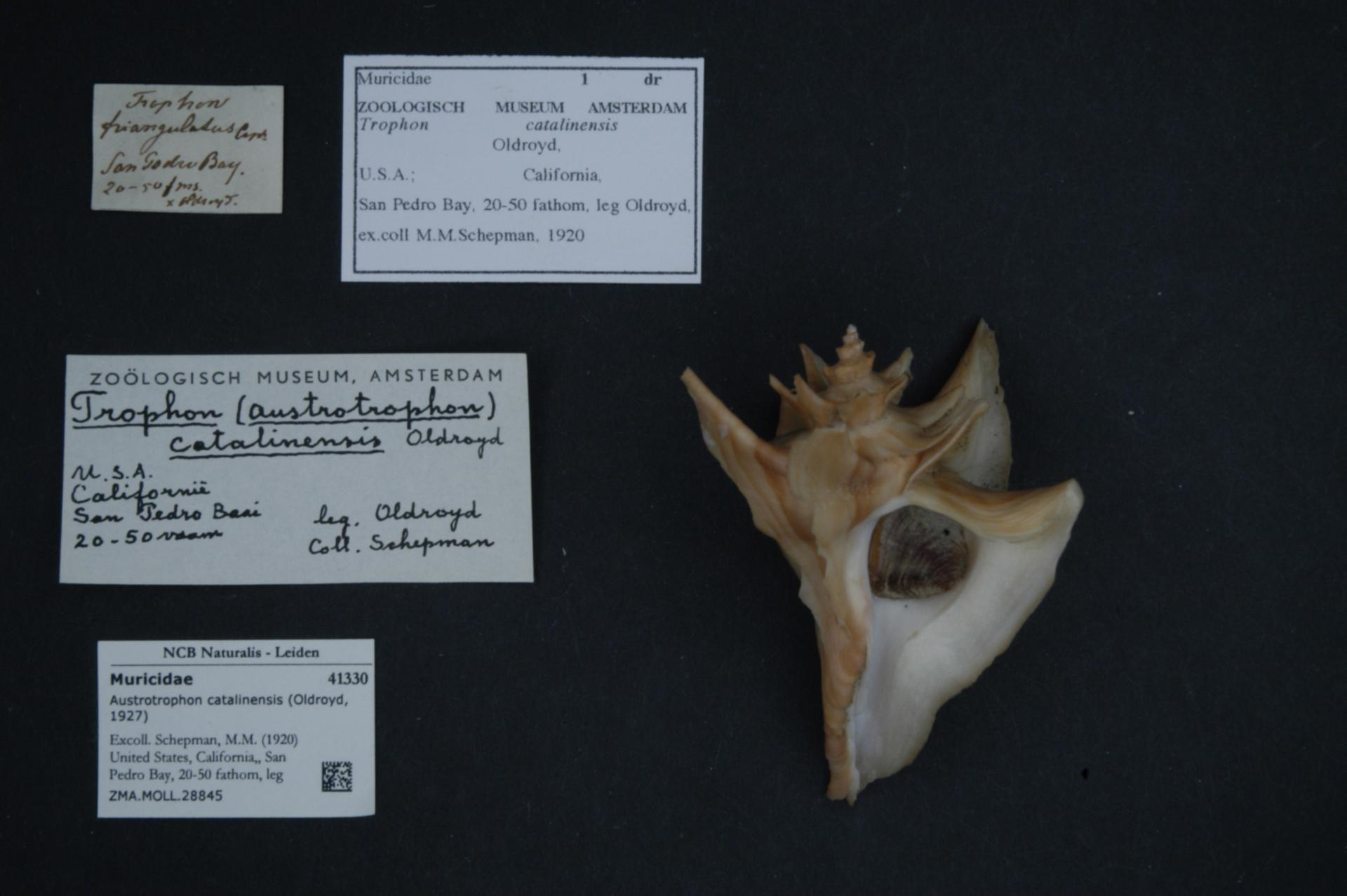
- Austrotrophon catalinensis shell

Scientific classification
- Kingdom: Animalia
- Phylum: Mollusca
- Class: Gastropoda
- Subclass: Caenogastropoda
- Order: Neogastropoda
- Family: Muricidae
- Genus: Austrotrophon
- Species: A. catalinensis

Binomial name
- Austrotrophon catalinensis (Oldroyd, 1927)

Synonyms
- Trophon catalinensis Oldroyd, 1927

= Austrotrophon catalinensis =

Species of gastropod

Austrotrophon catalinensis is a species of sea snail, a marine gastropod mollusk in the family Muricidae, the murex snails or rock snails.
