= Vokesinotus =

Scientific classification
- Kingdom: Animalia
- Phylum: Mollusca
- Class: Gastropoda
- Subclass: Caenogastropoda
- Order: Neogastropoda
- Superfamily: Muricoidea
- Family: Muricidae
- Subfamily: Ocenebrinae
- Genus: Vokesinotus; Petuch, 1988

Type species
- † Coralliophila lepidota Dall, 1890

Genus of gastropods

Vokesinotus is a genus of sea snails, marine gastropod mollusks in the family Muricidae, the murex snails or rock snails.

== Species ==
- † Vokesinotus lepidotus (Dall, 1890)
- Vokesinotus perrugatus (Conrad, 1846)
