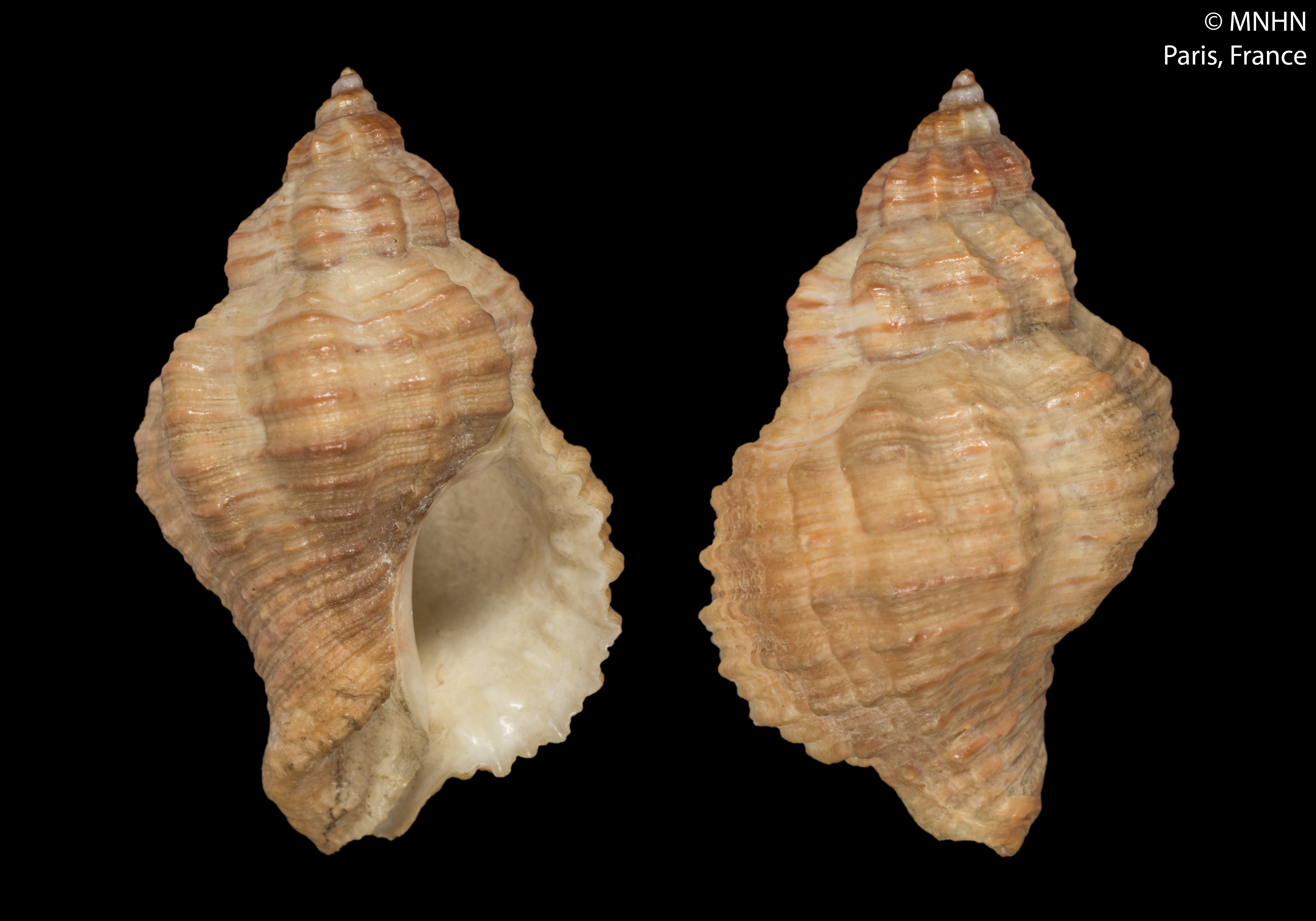
- Shell of Urosalpinx haneti (syntype at MNHN, Paris)

Scientific classification
- Kingdom: Animalia
- Phylum: Mollusca
- Class: Gastropoda
- Subclass: Caenogastropoda
- Order: Neogastropoda
- Family: Muricidae
- Genus: Urosalpinx
- Species: U. haneti

Binomial name
- Urosalpinx haneti (Petit de la Saussaye, 1856)

Synonyms
- Hanetia haneti (Petit de la Saussaye, 1856) ·; Murex haneti Petit de la Saussaye, 1856; Urosalpinx rushi (sic) (misspelling); Urosalpinx rushii Pilsbry, 1897

= Urosalpinx haneti =

Species of gastropod

Urosalpinx haneti is a species of sea snail, a marine gastropod mollusc in the family Muricidae, the murex snails or rock snails.

== Description ==
The length of the shell varies between 24 mm and 34 mm.

(Described as Urosalpinx rushii Pilsbry, 1897) The shell is shortly fusiform, thick and solid, white under a dull light brown epidermis. It contains about 6 whorls (?), the earliest whorl is convex and smooth, the rest sculptured and convex. The body whorl is convex and robust, excavated below.

Sculpture : numerous low longitudinal folds, quite distinct and regular on the whorls of the spire, but subobsolete on the body whorl. The spiral cords number about 43 on the body whorl, every fourth cord decidedly wider and more prominent, the middle one of the three intervening larger than the other two. On the spire, or in young specimens, the spirals are alternately larger and smaller.

The surface is roughened and minutely lamellose throughout. The long, oval aperture is pure white within, about three-fifths the total altitude of shell. The siphonal canal is contracted, narrow, considerably recurved, about one-third as long as the open portion of the aperture. The outer lip is thick, with about 7 low denticles within. The columella is straight and vertical. The umbilical chink is minute. The umbilical region is large, excavated, surrounded by a convex, prominent siphonal funicle. The operculum is very thin, with the nucleus near the base.

== Distribution ==
This marine species occurs off Uruguay and Brazil.
