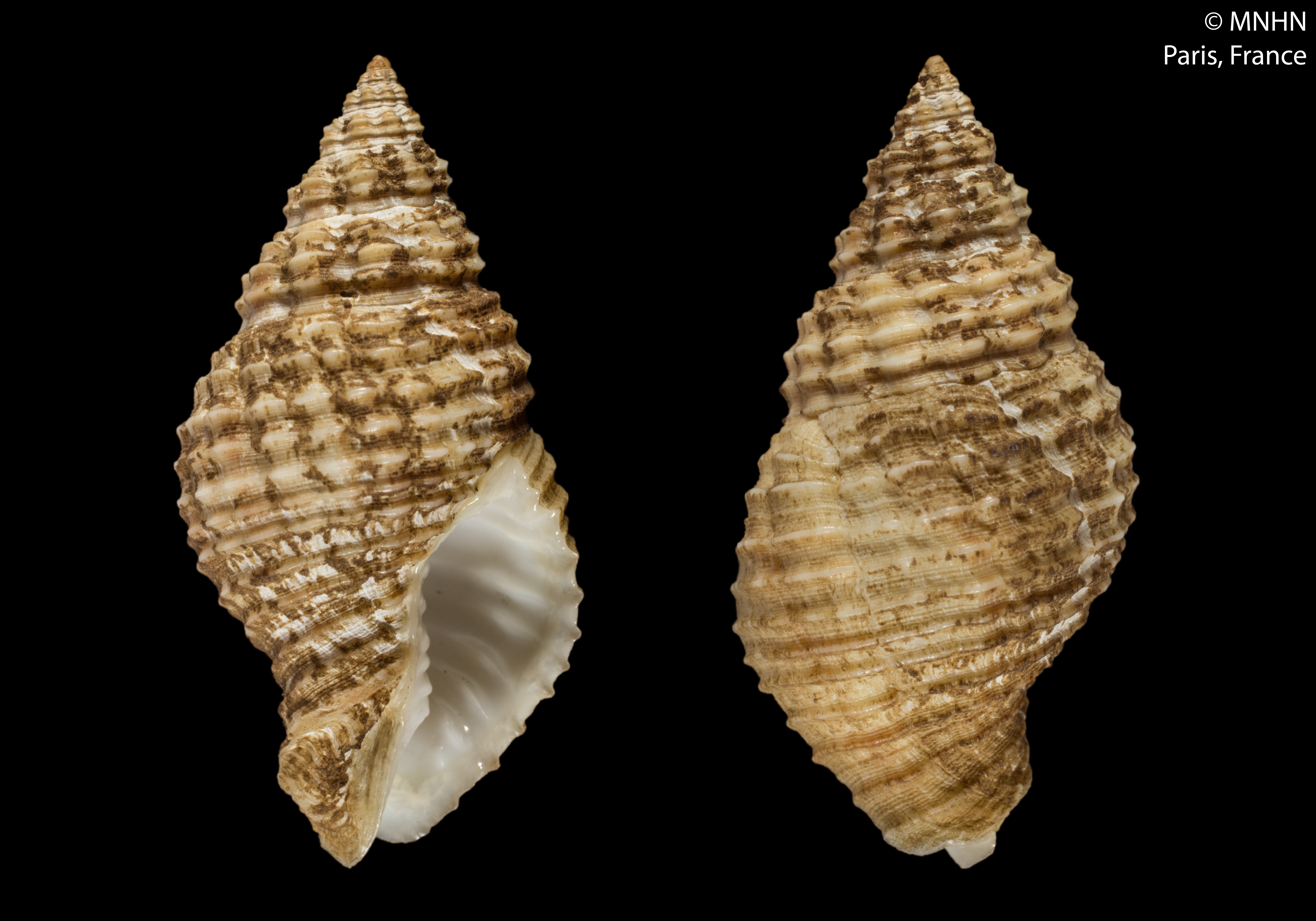

Scientific classification
- Kingdom: Animalia
- Phylum: Mollusca
- Class: Gastropoda
- Subclass: Caenogastropoda
- Order: Neogastropoda
- Family: Pisaniidae
- Genus: Solenosteira
- Species: S. cancellaria

Binomial name
- Solenosteira cancellaria (Conrad, 1846)

Synonyms
- Buccinum floridanum Petit de la Saussaye, 1856

= Solenosteira cancellaria =

Species of gastropod

Solenosteira cancellaria is a species of sea snail, a marine gastropod mollusc in the family Pisaniidae.
