= Pterorytis =

Scientific classification
- Kingdom: Animalia
- Phylum: Mollusca
- Class: Gastropoda
- Subclass: Caenogastropoda
- Order: Neogastropoda
- Family: Muricidae
- Subfamily: Ocenebrinae
- Genus: Pterorytis; Conrad, 1863

Synonyms
- Neurarhytis Olsson & Harbison, 1953

Genus of gastropods

Pterorytis is a genus of sea snails, marine gastropod mollusks in the family Muricidae, the murex snails or rock snails.

== Species ==
Species within the genus Pterorytis include:

- Pterorytis hamatus (Hinds, 1844)
