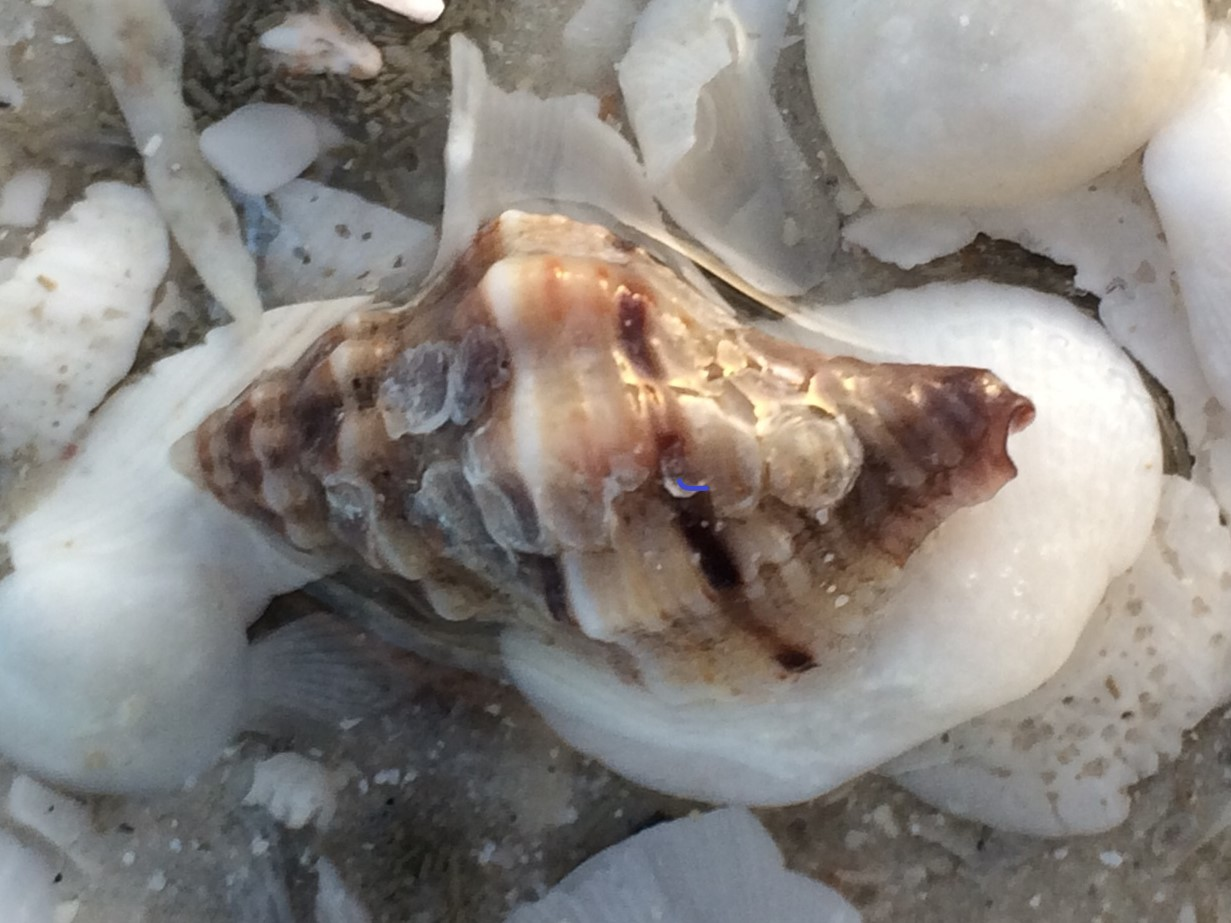

Scientific classification
- Kingdom: Animalia
- Phylum: Mollusca
- Class: Gastropoda
- Subclass: Caenogastropoda
- Order: Neogastropoda
- Family: Muricidae
- Subfamily: Ocenebrinae
- Genus: Vokesinotus
- Species: V. perrugatus

Binomial name
- Vokesinotus perrugatus (Conrad, 1846)

Synonyms
- Fusus perrugata Conrad, 1846; Urosalpinx perrugata (Conrad, 1846)

= Vokesinotus perrugatus =

Species of gastropod

Vokesinotus perrugatus is a species of sea snail, a marine gastropod mollusk in the family Muricidae, the murex snails or rock snails.

== Description ==
The length of the shell attains 28 mm.

== Distribution ==
This marine species occurs off Florida, USA.
