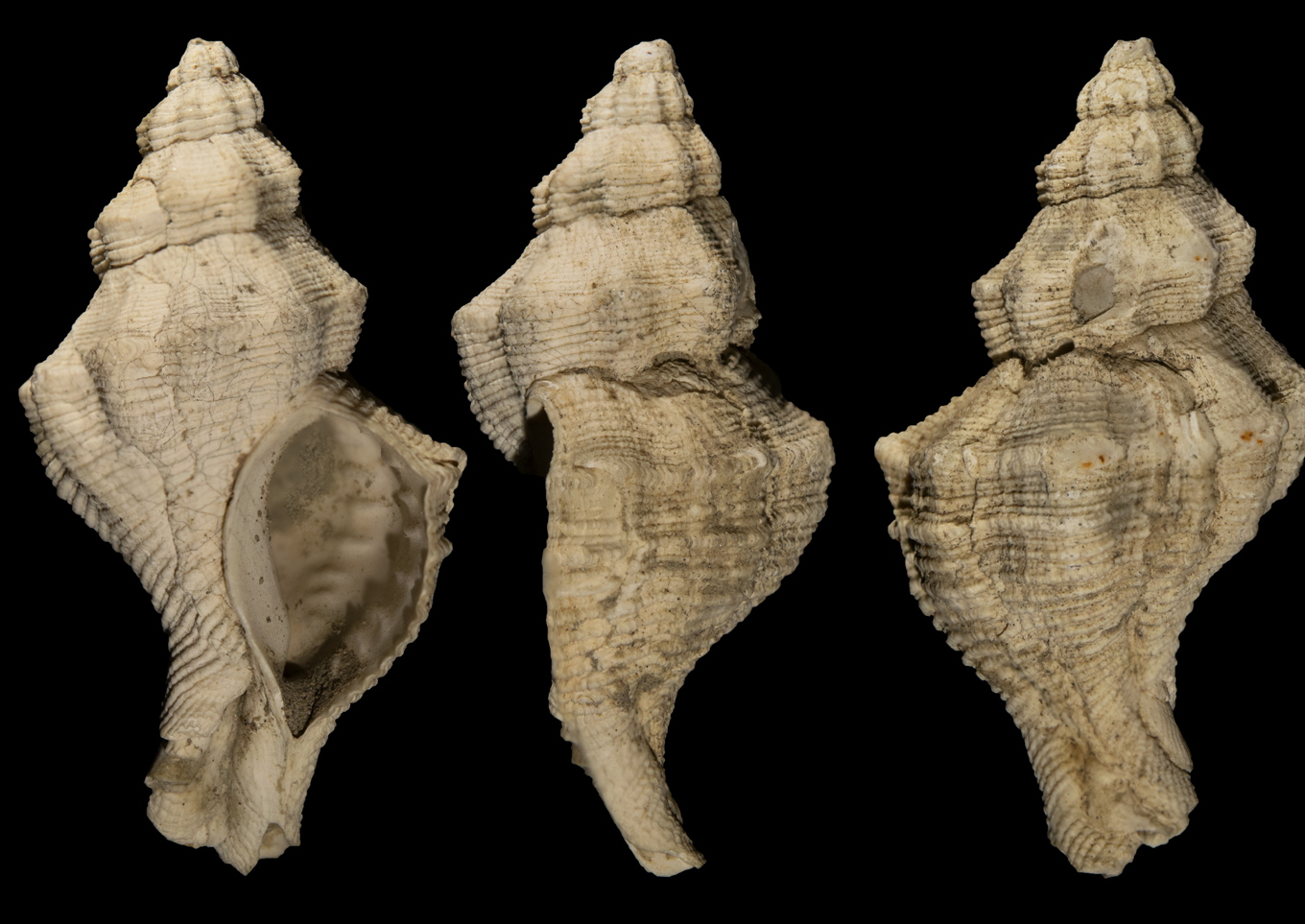
- Shell of Hadriania craticulata (fossil specimen at MNHN, Paris)

Scientific classification
- Kingdom: Animalia
- Phylum: Mollusca
- Class: Gastropoda
- Subclass: Caenogastropoda
- Order: Neogastropoda
- Family: Muricidae
- Genus: Hadriania
- Species: H. craticulata

Binomial name
- Hadriania craticulata Bucquoy & Dautzenberg, 1882

Synonyms
- Hadriania brocchii (Monterosato, 1872) (preoccupied species name); Hadriania brocchi var. armata Settepassi, 1977; Hadriania brocchi var. carinatella Coen, 1933; Hadriania craticuloides (Vokes, 1964); Hadriania oretea (de Gregorio, 1885); Latirus albus (Scacchi, 1835); Murex brocchii Monterosato, 1872; Murex craticulatus Brocchi, 1814; Murex craticulatus var. albus Scacchi, 1835; Murex craticulatus var. bopirus de Gregorio, 1885; Murex craticulatus var. cosgus de Gregorio, 1885; Murex craticulatus var. ipimus de Gregorio, 1885; Murex craticulatus var. oreteus de Gregorio, 1885; Murex craticulatus var. propetipus de Gregorio, 1885; Murex craticulatus var. rochetus de Gregorio, 1885; Murex craticulatus var. trisus de Gregorio, 1885; Ocenebra (Hadriania) brocchii Monterosato, T.A. de M. di, 1875; Ocenebra (Hadriania) craticuloides (Vokes, E.H., 1964); Tritonalia (Hadriania) craticuloides Vokes, 1964

= Hadriania craticulata =

Species of gastropod

Hadriania craticulata is a species of sea snail, a marine gastropod mollusc in the family Muricidae, the murex snails or rock snails.

== Description ==
The shell size varies between 20 mm and 45 mm

== Distribution ==
This species occurs in the Mediterranean Sea off Morocco.
