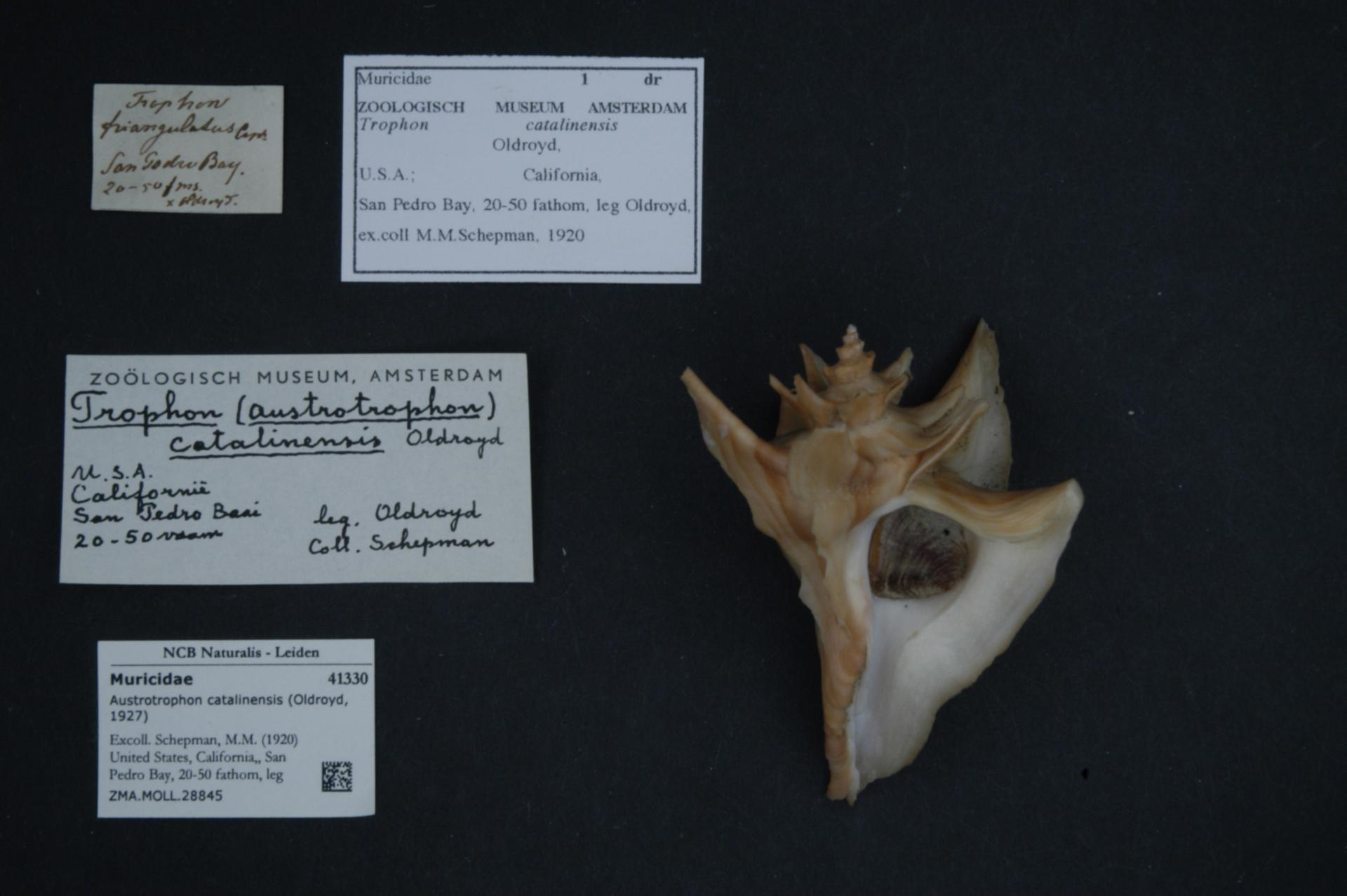
- Austrotrophon catalinensis shell

Scientific classification
- Kingdom: Animalia
- Phylum: Mollusca
- Class: Gastropoda
- Subclass: Caenogastropoda
- Order: Neogastropoda
- Family: Muricidae
- Subfamily: Ocenebrinae
- Genus: Austrotrophon; Dall, 1902

= Austrotrophon =

Genus of gastropods

Austrotrophon is a genus of sea snails, marine gastropod mollusks in the family Muricidae, the murex snails or rock snails.

== Species ==
Species within the genus Austrotrophon include:

- Austrotrophon catalinensis (Oldroyd, 1927)
- Austrotrophon cerrosensis (Dall, 1891)
- Austrotrophon pinnata (Dall, 1902)
