= Muregina lugubris =

Scientific classification
- Kingdom: Animalia
- Phylum: Mollusca
- Class: Gastropoda
- Subclass: Caenogastropoda
- Order: Neogastropoda
- Family: Muricidae
- Genus: Muregina
- Species: M. lugubris

Binomial name
- Muregina lugubris (Broderip, 1833)

Synonyms
- Murex fontainei Tryon, 1880; Murex lugubris Broderip, 1833; Murex monoceros d'Orbigny, 1841

Species of gastropod

Muregina lugubris is a species of sea snail, a marine gastropod mollusk in the family Muricidae, the murex snails or rock snails.
