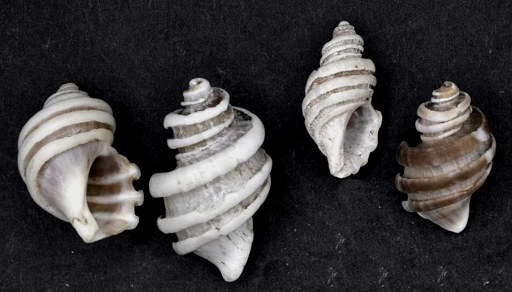
- Trochia cingulata

Scientific classification
- Kingdom: Animalia
- Phylum: Mollusca
- Class: Gastropoda
- Subclass: Caenogastropoda
- Order: Neogastropoda
- Superfamily: Muricoidea
- Family: Muricidae
- Subfamily: Ocenebrinae
- Genus: Trochia; Swainson, 1840

Type species
- Buccinum trochlea Bruguière, 1789

= Trochia =

Genus of gastropods

Trochia is a genus of sea snails, marine gastropod mollusks in the family Muricidae, the murex snails or rock snails.

== Description ==
The whorls are separated by a deep groove. The inner lip is thickened, convex and striated. The aperture shows a very short siphonal canal.

== Species ==
Species within the genus Trochia include:

- Trochia cingulata (Linnaeus, 1771)
