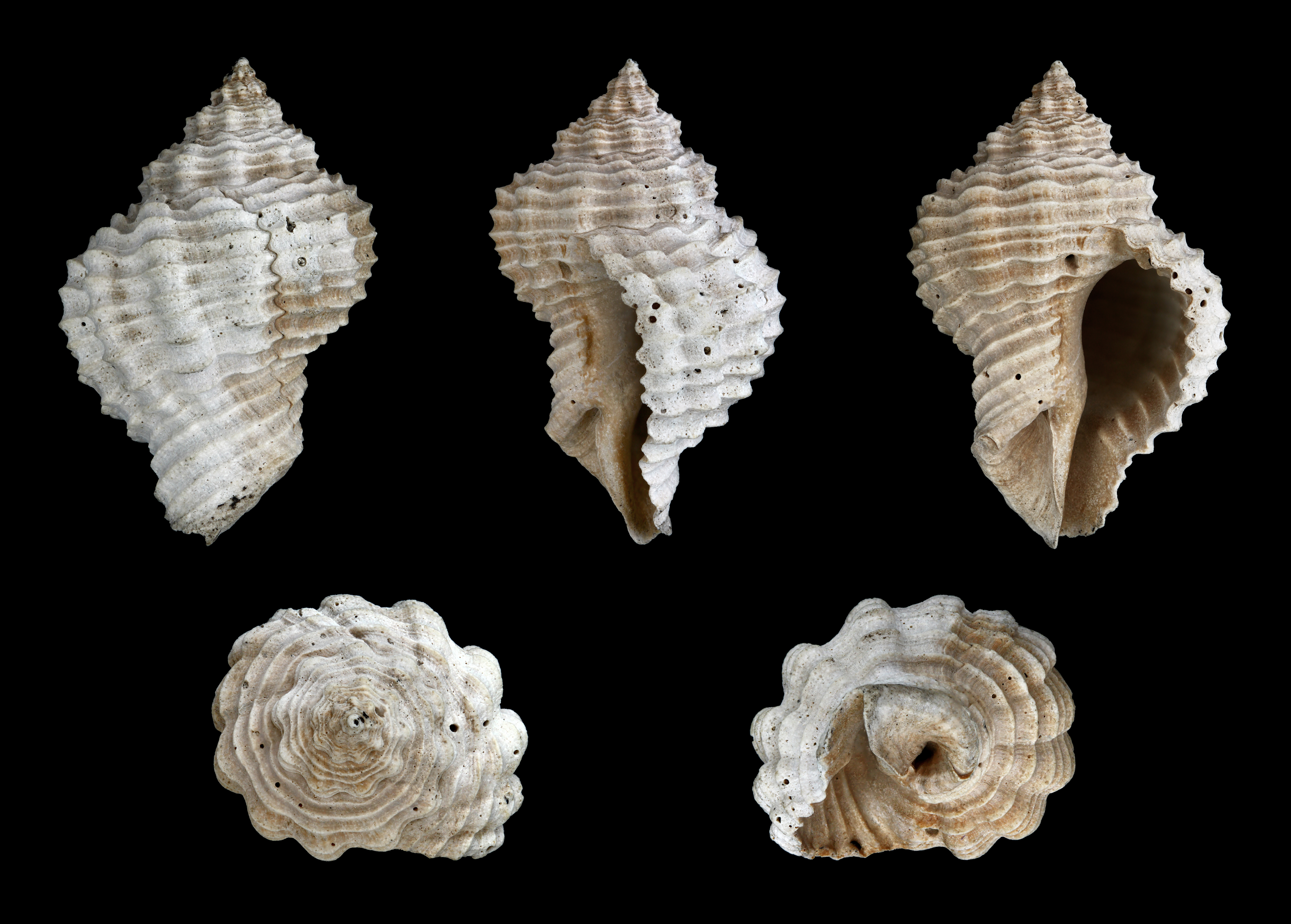
- Shell of Urosalpinx mengeana (Dorsal, lateral (right side), ventral, back, and front view. length 3.0 cm)

Scientific classification
- Kingdom: Animalia
- Phylum: Mollusca
- Class: Gastropoda
- Subclass: Caenogastropoda
- Order: Neogastropoda
- Family: Muricidae
- Subfamily: Ocenebrinae
- Genus: Urosalpinx
- Species: †U. mengeana

Binomial name
- †Urosalpinx mengeana (W. H. Dall, 1890)

Synonyms
- Solenosteira mengeana W. H. Dall, 1890 (original combination)

= Urosalpinx mengeana =

Species of gastropod

Urosalpinx mengeana is an extinct species of sea snail, a marine gastropod mollusk in the family Muricidae, the murex snails or rock snails.

== Description ==
The length of the shell attains 25 mm, its maximum diameter 18 mm.

(Original description) The shell has a small, smooth, bulbous protoconch of 1½ whorls, followed by about six sculptured, rapidly enlarging later whorls. The protoconch is usually lost with the first one or two following whorls, so that the apex (as in our figure) seems somewhat blunt, but when perfect, though short, it is quite acute. The sculpture consists of 12-15 transverse rounded ribs, beginning at or near the suture and continuing over the periphery, becoming obsolete on the base of the whorl. The incremental lines are also somewhat alternated in strength and quite distinct. The spiral sculpture consists of (on the body whorl ten or twelve) sharp, even ridges, which override the ribs and descend into the interspaces, and each of which is usually accompanied by a pair of very fine, sharp threads parallel to it in the separating grooves. The ridges are usually very even in strength, but on the siphonal canal vary, being sometimes weaker or even oalmost absent there. The suture is distinct, undulated by the ribs, not channelled The whorls are full and rounded, the last constricted at the base. The aperture is rather elongated, differentiated from the siphonal canal. The throat is strongly lirate, with 8-10 elevated threads ending a little way within the edge of the outer lip, which is crenulated by the sculpture. The columella is simple, with a thin callus. The siphonal canal is narrow, deepand somewhat recurved. The siphonal fasciole is strong, enclosing with the reflected columella a moderate, not very deep umbilical pit.

== Distribution ==
Fossils were found in Pleistocene strata of Florida, USA.
