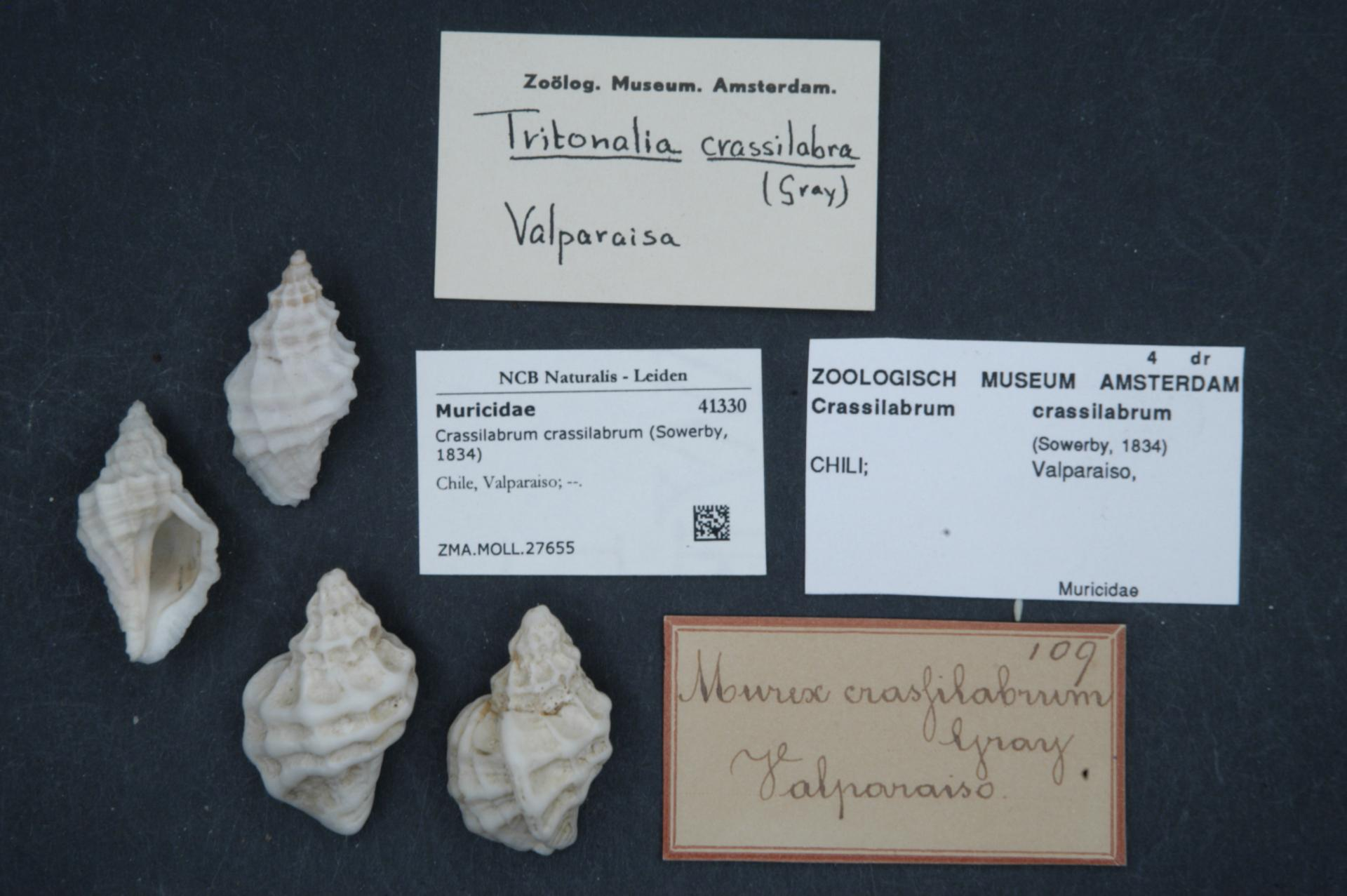
- Crassilabrum crassilabrum shells

Scientific classification
- Kingdom: Animalia
- Phylum: Mollusca
- Class: Gastropoda
- Subclass: Caenogastropoda
- Order: Neogastropoda
- Family: Muricidae
- Genus: Crassilabrum
- Species: C. crassilabrum

Binomial name
- Crassilabrum crassilabrum (Sowerby II, 1834)

Synonyms
- Murex crassilabrum Sowerby, 1834; Murex labiosus Gray, 1828

= Crassilabrum crassilabrum =

Species of gastropod

Crassilabrum crassilabrum is a species of sea snail, a marine gastropod mollusk in the family Muricidae, the murex snails or rock snails.
