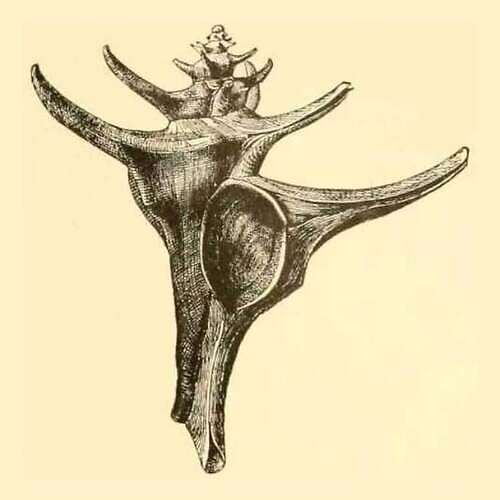
- Illustration of the shell of the mollusk Calcitrapessa leeana

Scientific classification
- Kingdom: Animalia
- Phylum: Mollusca
- Class: Gastropoda
- Subclass: Caenogastropoda
- Order: Neogastropoda
- Family: Muricidae
- Genus: Calcitrapessa
- Species: C. leeana

Binomial name
- Calcitrapessa leeana (Dall, 1890)

Synonyms
- Murex leeanus Dall, 1890; Murex (Chicoreus) leeanus Dall, 1890 (basionym); Pteropurpura (Calcitrapessa) leeana (Dall, 1890); Pteropurpura leeana (Dall, 1890)

= Calcitrapessa leeana =

Species of gastropod

Calcitrapessa leeana is a species of sea snail, a marine gastropod mollusk in the family Muricidae, the murex snails or rock snails.

== Distribution ==
This marine species occurs in Baja California.
