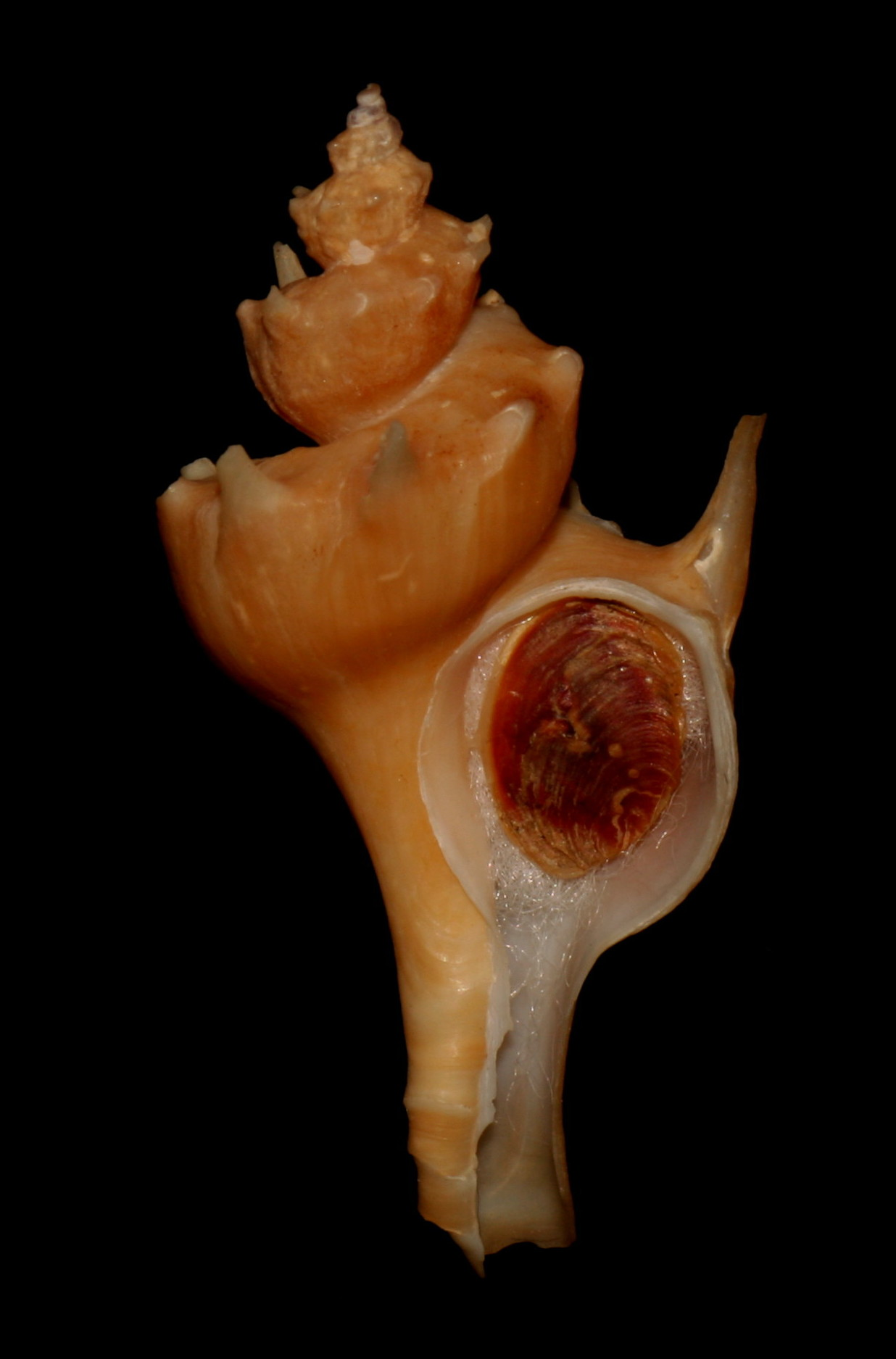
- Shell and operculum of Zacatrophon beebei (Hertlein & Strong, 1948), 37.4 mm in length, from off Cabo San Lucas, Mexico, in bait traps at 100 m

Scientific classification
- Kingdom: Animalia
- Phylum: Mollusca
- Class: Gastropoda
- Subclass: Caenogastropoda
- Order: Neogastropoda
- Family: Muricidae
- Genus: Zacatrophon
- Species: Z. beebei

Binomial name
- Zacatrophon beebei (Hertlein & Strong, 1948)

Synonyms
- Trophon beebei Hertlein & Strong, 1948

= Zacatrophon beebei =

Species of gastropod

Zacatrophon beebei is a species of sea snail, a marine gastropod mollusk in the family Muricidae, the murex snails or rock snails.

== Description ==
This attractive shell has an open channel along the suture of the whorl and is yellowish to pinkish brown in color, and bears a row of guttered spines on the shoulder of the whorl. Length 52 mm, diameter 23 mm.

== Distribution ==
This snail is found subtidally in deep water in the southern part of the Gulf of California, Mexico, at 90 to 110 m depth.
