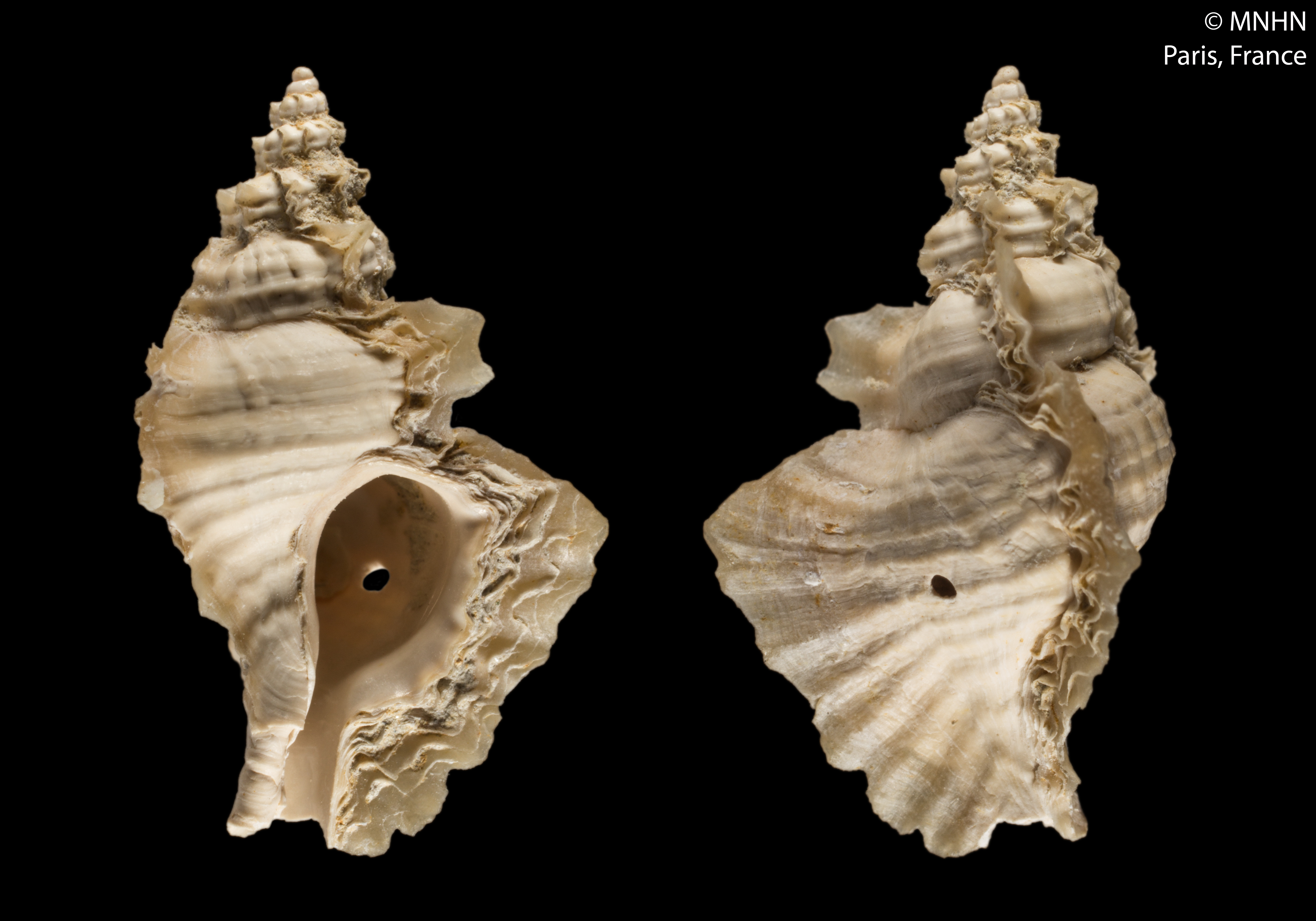
- Shell of † Pterynopsis meridionalis (holotype at MNHN, Paris)

Scientific classification
- Kingdom: Animalia
- Phylum: Mollusca
- Class: Gastropoda
- Subclass: Caenogastropoda
- Order: Neogastropoda
- Superfamily: Muricoidea
- Family: Muricidae
- Subfamily: Ocenebrinae
- Genus: †Pterynopsis; E. H. Vokes, 1972

Type species
- † Pterynopsis prosopeion E.H. Vokes, 1972

= Pterynopsis =

Genus of gastropods

Pterynopsis is an extinct genus of sea snails, marine gastropod mollusks in the subfamily Ocenebrinae of the family Muricidae, the murex snails or rock snails.

== Species ==
- † Pterynopsis meridionalis Lozouet, 1999
- † Pterynopsis prosopeion E.H. Vokes, 1972
- † Pterynopsis subcontabulata (Millet, 1854)
