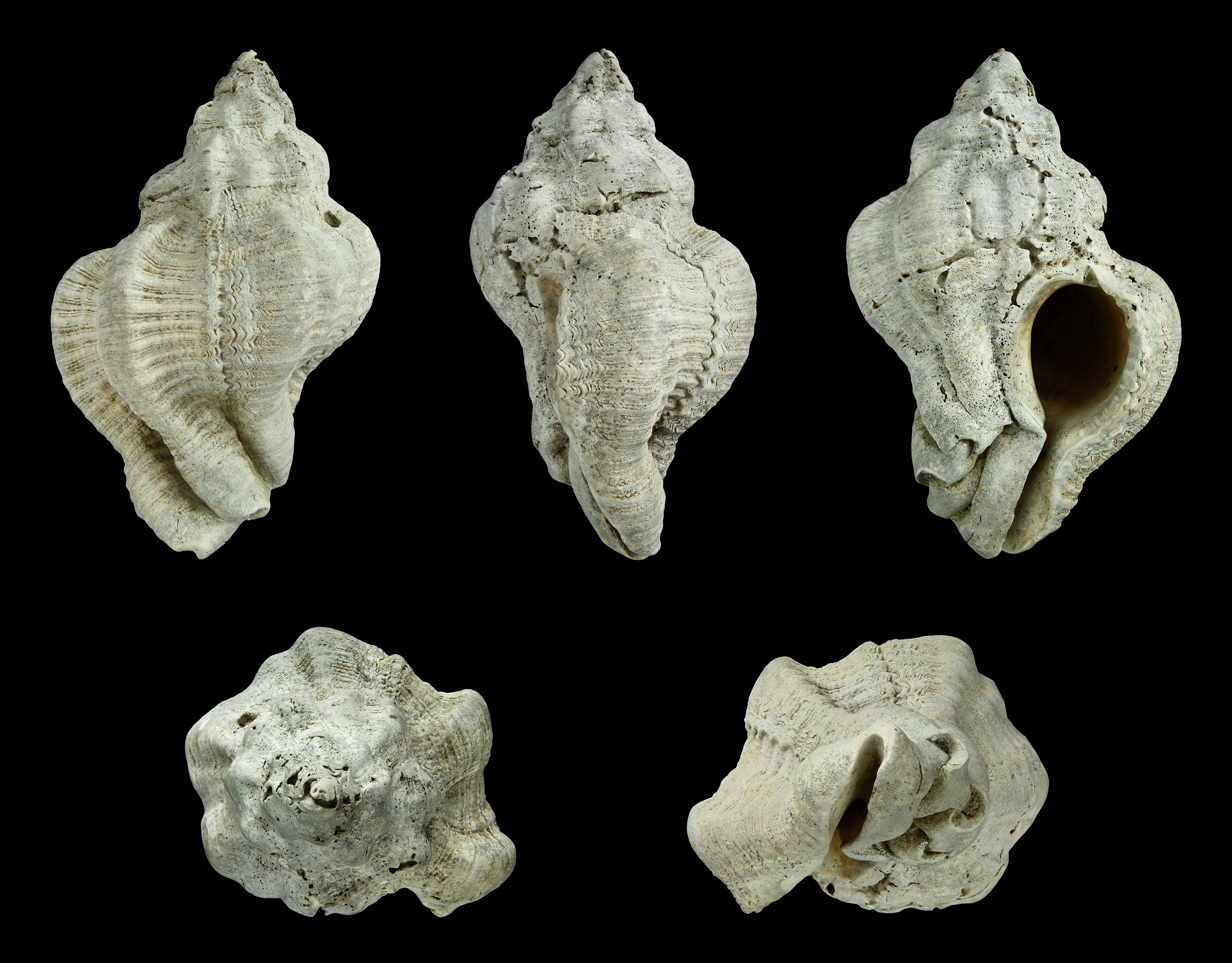
- Shell of Hadriania trunculata

Scientific classification
- Kingdom: Animalia
- Phylum: Mollusca
- Class: Gastropoda
- Subclass: Caenogastropoda
- Order: Neogastropoda
- Superfamily: Muricoidea
- Family: Muricidae
- Subfamily: Ocenebrinae
- Genus: Hadriania; Bucquoy, Dautzenberg & Dollfus, 1882

Type species
- Hadriania craticulata Bucquoy & Dautzenberg, 1882

Synonyms
- Tritonalia (Hadriania) Bucquoy & Dautzenberg, 1882

= Hadriania (gastropod) =

Genus of gastropods

Hadriania is a genus of sea snails, marine gastropod mollusks in the family Muricidae, the murex snails or rock snails.

== Species ==
Species within the genus Hadriania include:

- † Hadriania brevituba (Millet, 1865)
- Hadriania craticulata Bucquoy & Dautzenberg, 1882
- † Hadriania minutisquama Cossman & Peyrot, 1924
- † Hadriania mioincrassata Sacco, 1904
- Hadriania sperata (Cossmann, 1921)
- † Hadriania textiliosa (Lamarck, 1803)

Species brought into synonymy

- Hadriania brocchii(Monterosato, 1872): synonym of Hadriania craticulata Bucquoy, Dautzenberg & Dollfus, 1882 (preoccupied species name)
- Hadriania craticuloides (Vokes, 1964): synonym of Hadriania craticulata Bucquoy, Dautzenberg & Dollfus, 1882
- Hadriania oretea (de Gregorio, 1885): synonym of Hadriania craticulata Bucquoy, Dautzenberg & Dollfus, 1882
- Hadriania provencalis (Risso, 1826): synonym of Hadriania craticulata Bucquoy & Dautzenberg, 1882
