= Pterorytis hamatus =

Scientific classification
- Kingdom: Animalia
- Phylum: Mollusca
- Class: Gastropoda
- Subclass: Caenogastropoda
- Order: Neogastropoda
- Family: Muricidae
- Genus: Pterorytis
- Species: P. hamatus

Binomial name
- Pterorytis hamatus (Hinds, 1844)

Synonyms
- Murex hamatus Hinds, 1844

Species of gastropod

Pterorytis hamatus is a species of sea snail, a marine gastropod mollusk in the family Muricidae, the murex snails or rock snails.
