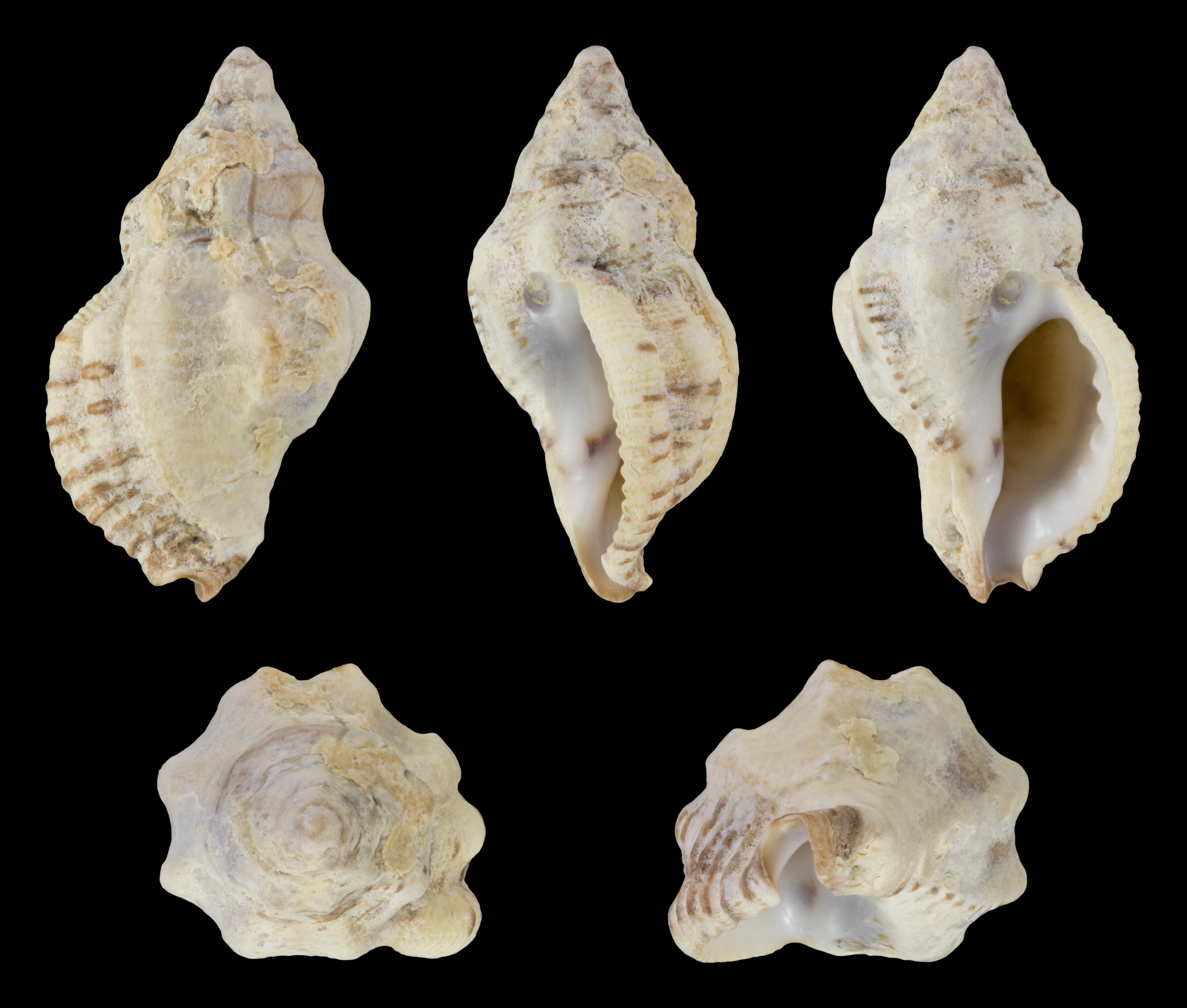

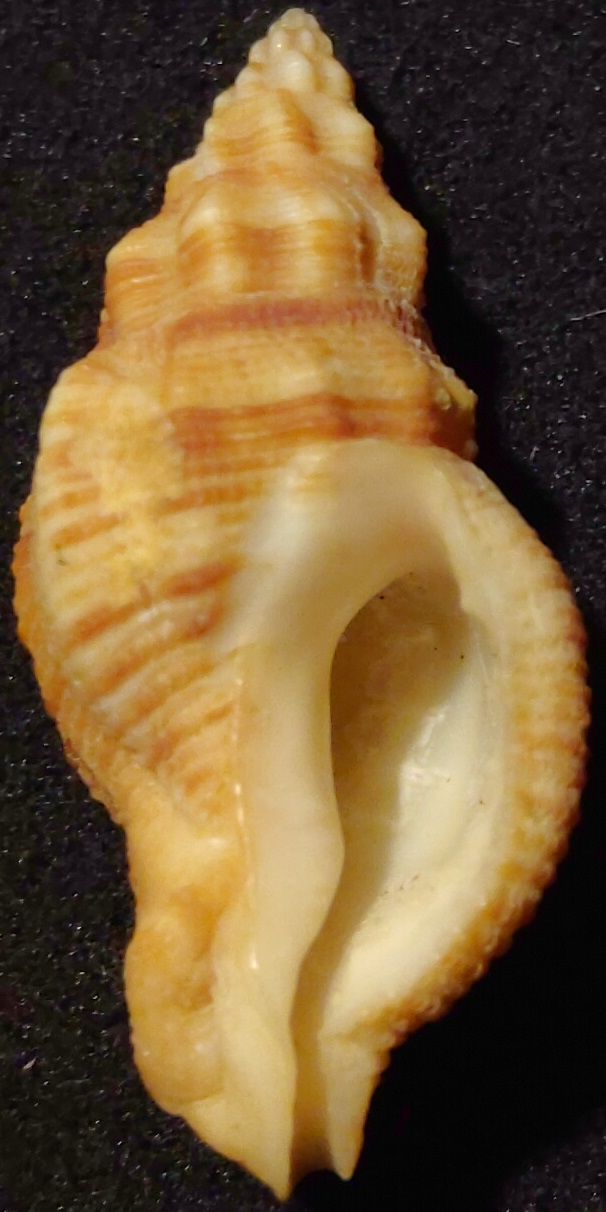

Scientific classification
- Kingdom: Animalia
- Phylum: Mollusca
- Class: Gastropoda
- Subclass: Caenogastropoda
- Order: Neogastropoda
- Family: Muricidae
- Genus: Ergalatax
- Species: E. contracta

Binomial name
- Ergalatax contracta (Reeve, 1846)

Synonyms
- Buccinum contractum Reeve, 1846; Buccinum funiculatum Reeve, L.A., 1846; Cronia martensi Dall, 1923; Ergalatax pauper Watson, R.B., 1886; Ergalatax recurrens Iredale, T., 1931; Morula ocellata (Reeve, 1846); Murex calcarius Dunker, 1860; Ocenebra contracta (Reeve, 1846); Ocinebra pilsbryana Baker, 1891; Pentadactylus ceylonicum Preston, 1909; Ricinula ocellata Reeve, 1846; Ricinula siderea Martens, E.C. von, 1874; Urosalpinx bandana Schepman, 1911; Urosalpinx innotabilis E. A. Smith, 1879; Urosalpinx smithi Schepman, 1911

= Ergalatax contracta =

Species of gastropod

Ergalatax contracta, the contracted rock shell, is a species of sea snail, a marine gastropod mollusk in the family Muricidae, the murex snails or rock snails.

== Description ==
The shell size varies between 20 mm and 45 mm.

== Distribution ==
This species is distributed in the Red Sea, the Persian Gulf, in the Indian Ocean along Madagascar and as an invasive species in the Mediterranean Sea, in the Pacific Ocean along the Philippines, the Sulu Archipelago, Australia (the Torres Strait), Hawaii and Tonga.
