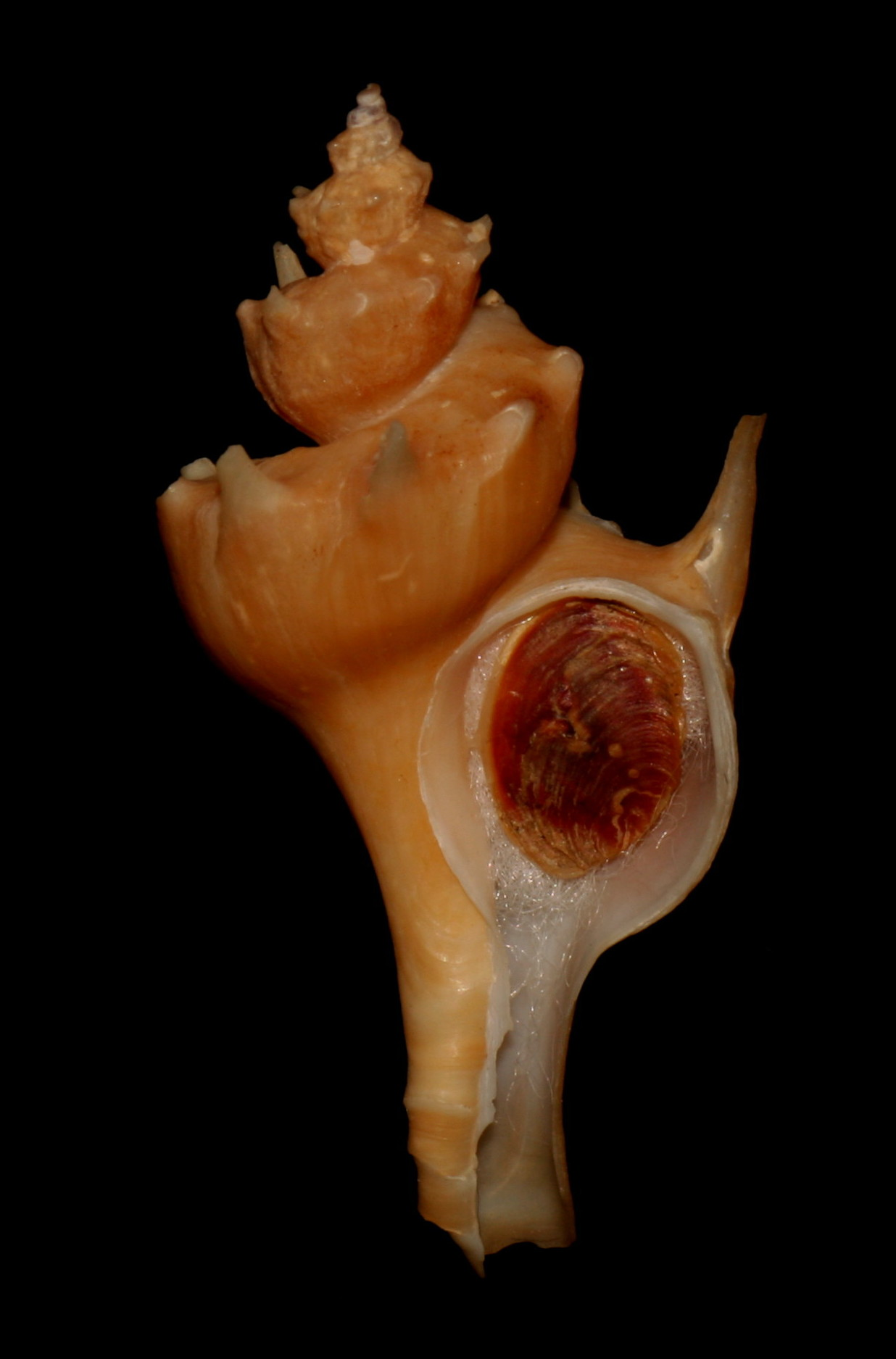
- Shell and operculum of Zacatrophon beebei (Hertlein & Strong, 1948), from off Cabo San Lucas, Mexico, in bait traps at 100 m

Scientific classification
- Kingdom: Animalia
- Phylum: Mollusca
- Class: Gastropoda
- Subclass: Caenogastropoda
- Order: Neogastropoda
- Superfamily: Muricoidea
- Family: Muricidae
- Genus: Zacatrophon; Hertlein & Strong, 1951

Type species
- Zacatrophon beebei (Hertlein & A. M. Strong, 1948)

Synonyms
- Trophon (Zacatrophon) Hertlein & A. M. Strong, 1951 (original rank)

= Zacatrophon =

Genus of gastropods

Zacatrophon is a genus of sea snails, marine gastropod mollusks in the family Muricidae, the murex snails or rock snails.

== Species ==
Species within the genus Zacatrophon include:

- Zacatrophon beebei (Hertlein & Strong, 1948)
- Zacatrophon coani Houart & Hendrickx, 2020
- Zacatrophon goliath Houart & Löser, 2020
- Zacatrophon scotti Houart & Hendrickx, 2020
- Zacatrophon skoglundae Houart, 2010
