= Gracilipurpura =

Scientific classification
- Kingdom: Animalia
- Phylum: Mollusca
- Class: Gastropoda
- Subclass: Caenogastropoda
- Order: Neogastropoda
- Superfamily: Buccinoidea
- Family: Fasciolariidae
- Genus: Gracilipurpura; Jousseaume, 1880

Type species
- Fusus strigosus Lamarck, 1822

Synonyms
- Adriania del Prete, 1883 junior objective synonym; Fusinus (Gracilipurpura) Jousseaume, 1880 superseded rank; Hadriania Bucquoy & Dautzenberg, 1882 junior objective synonym; Murex (Hadriania) Bucquoy & Dautzenberg, 1882; Pseudomurex (Hadriania) Bucquoy & Dautzenberg, 1882 junior subjective synonym; Tritonalia (Hadriania) Bucquoy & Dautzenberg, 1882 junior subjective synonym

Genus of gastropods

Gracilipurpura is a genus of sea snails, marine gastropod mollusks in the subfamily Fusininae of the family Fasciolariidae, the spindle snails, the tulip snails and their allies.

== Species ==
Species within the genus Gracilipurpura include:

- † Gracilipurpura basedowi (Cossmann, 1903)
- † Gracilipurpura brevituba (Millet, 1865)
- Gracilipurpura craticulata (Bucquoy & Dautzenberg, 1882)
- Gracilipurpura neogenica (Cossmann, 1901)
- † Gracilipurpura polonica (Bałuk, 1995)
- Gracilipurpura sperata (Cossmann, 1921)

Synonyms

- † Gracilipurpura acuticostata (Speyer, 1860): synonym of † Exilioidea elatior (Beyrich, 1848)
- † Gracilipurpura affinis (Bronn, 1831) : synonym of † Pseudofusus affinis (Bronn, 1831) (superseded combination)
- † Gracilipurpura austriaca (Hoernes & Auinger, 1890): synonym of † Pseudofusus austriacus (R. Hoernes & Auinger, 1890) (superseded combinatio
- † Gracilipurpura cincta (Bellardi & Michelotti, 1840): synonym of Pseudofusus cinctus (Bellardi & Michelotti, 1840) (superseded combination)
- † Gracilipurpura raouli (Lozouet, 2015): synonym of † Pseudofusus raouli (Lozouet, 2015) (superseded combination)
- Gracilipurpura rostrata (Olivi, 1792): synonym of Pseudofusus rostratus (Olivi, 1792) (superseded combination)
