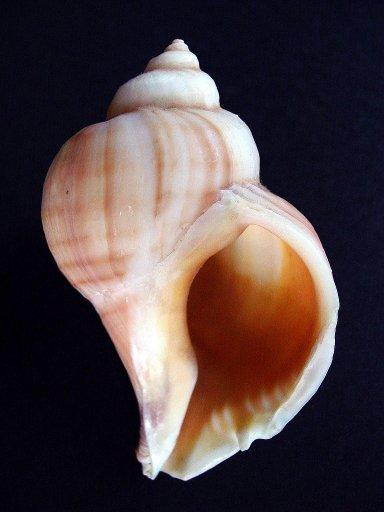

Scientific classification
- Kingdom: Animalia
- Phylum: Mollusca
- Class: Gastropoda
- Subclass: Caenogastropoda
- Order: Neogastropoda
- Family: Muricidae
- Genus: Chorus
- Species: C. giganteus

Binomial name
- Chorus giganteus (Lesson, 1831)

Synonyms
- Monoceros giganteum Lesson, 1831; Monoceros fusoides King & Broderip, 1832

= Chorus giganteus =

Species of gastropod

Chorus giganteus is a species of sea snail in the family Muricidae. It is endemic to the coast of Chile, where it occurs from Antofagasta (23° S) to the south of the country (around 39° S) at depths of 8–30 metres (26–98 ft). It is a benthic predator that lives on rocks in temperate waters. It has been overexploited by local fishermen in much of its range.

== See also ==
- List of marine molluscs of Chile
