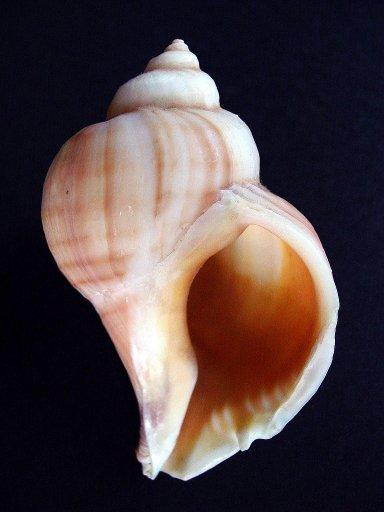
- Chorus giganteus shell

Scientific classification
- Kingdom: Animalia
- Phylum: Mollusca
- Class: Gastropoda
- Subclass: Caenogastropoda
- Order: Neogastropoda
- Superfamily: Muricoidea
- Family: Muricidae
- Subfamily: Ocenebrinae
- Genus: Chorus; Gray, 1847

Type species
- Monoceros giganteum Lesson, 1831

= Chorus (gastropod) =

Genus of gastropods

Chorus is a genus of sea snails, marine gastropod mollusks in the family Muricidae, the murex snails or rock snails.

== Description ==
The shell is ovate and ventricose. The spire is elevated. The wide aperture is oval. The siphonal canal is straight, produced in front. The columella is smooth and curved. The outer lip shows a prominent tooth at the fore part.

== Species ==
Species within the genus Chorus include:

- † Chorus blainvillei (A. d'Orbigny, 1843)
- † Chorus covacevichi DeVries, 1997
- † Chorus doliaris (R. A. Philippi, 1887)
- † Chorus frassinettii DeVries, 1997
- Chorus giganteus (Lesson, 1831)
- † Chorus grandis (R. A. Philippi, 1887)
