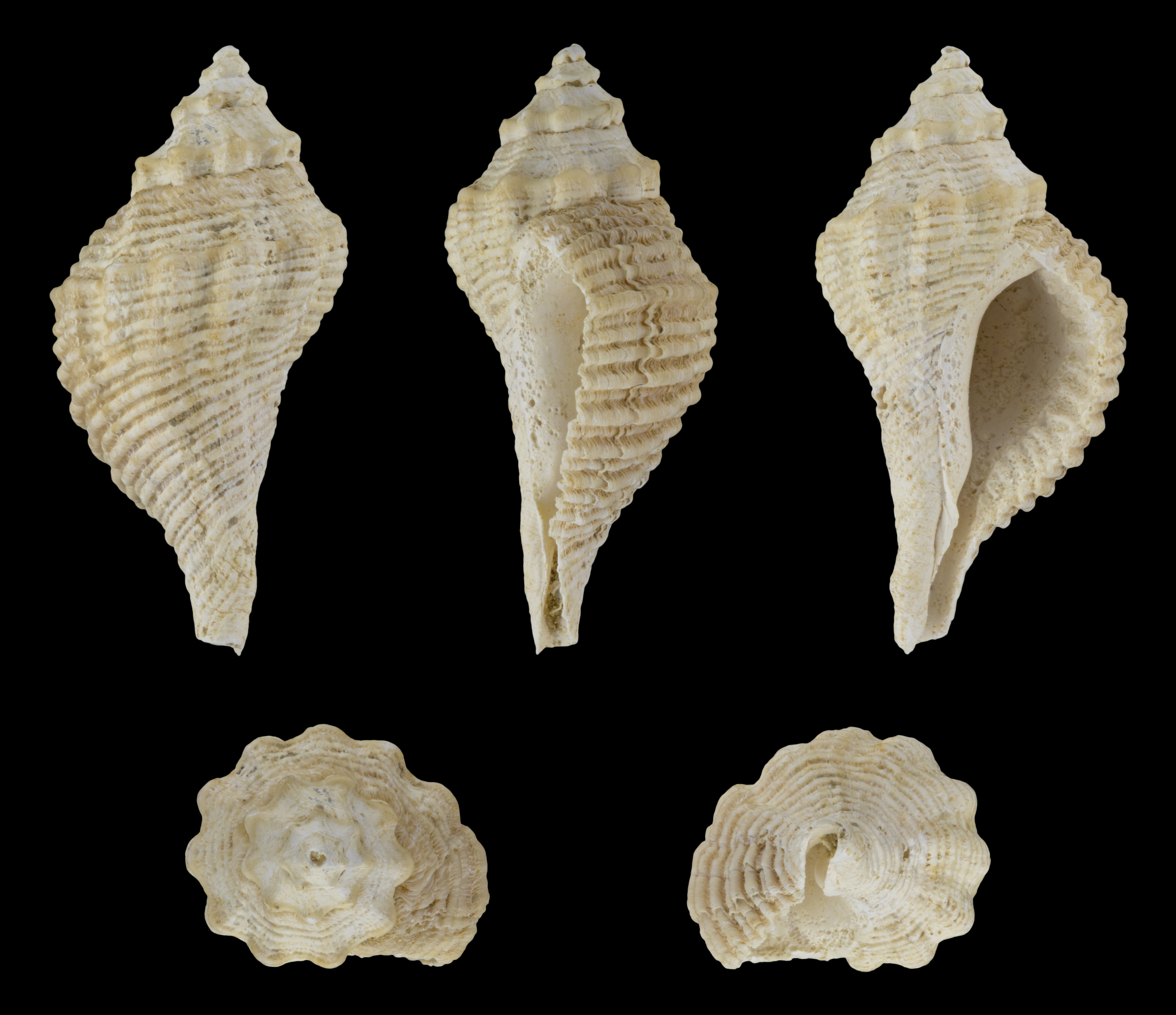
- Fossil shell of Heteropurpura polymorpha from Pliocene of Italy

Scientific classification
- Kingdom: Animalia
- Phylum: Mollusca
- Class: Gastropoda
- Subclass: Caenogastropoda
- Order: Neogastropoda
- Family: Muricidae
- Genus: †Heteropurpura; Jousseaume, 1880
- Species: †H. polymorpha

Binomial name
- †Heteropurpura polymorpha Brocchi 1814

Synonyms
- Murex polymorphus

= Heteropurpura =

Heteropurpura Temporal range: Pliocene - Recent

Extinct genus of gastropods

Heteropurpura is an extinct genus of predatory sea snail, a marine gastropod mollusk in the family Muricidae, the rock snails or murex snails.

== Fossil records ==
The fossil record of this species dates back to the Pliocene (age range: 3.6 to 2.588 million years ago). These fossils have been found in Italy and Spain.

== Description ==
Shells of Heteropurpura species can reach a size of about 35 millimetres (1.4 in).

== Species ==
- †Heteropurpura polymorpha Brocchi 1814
