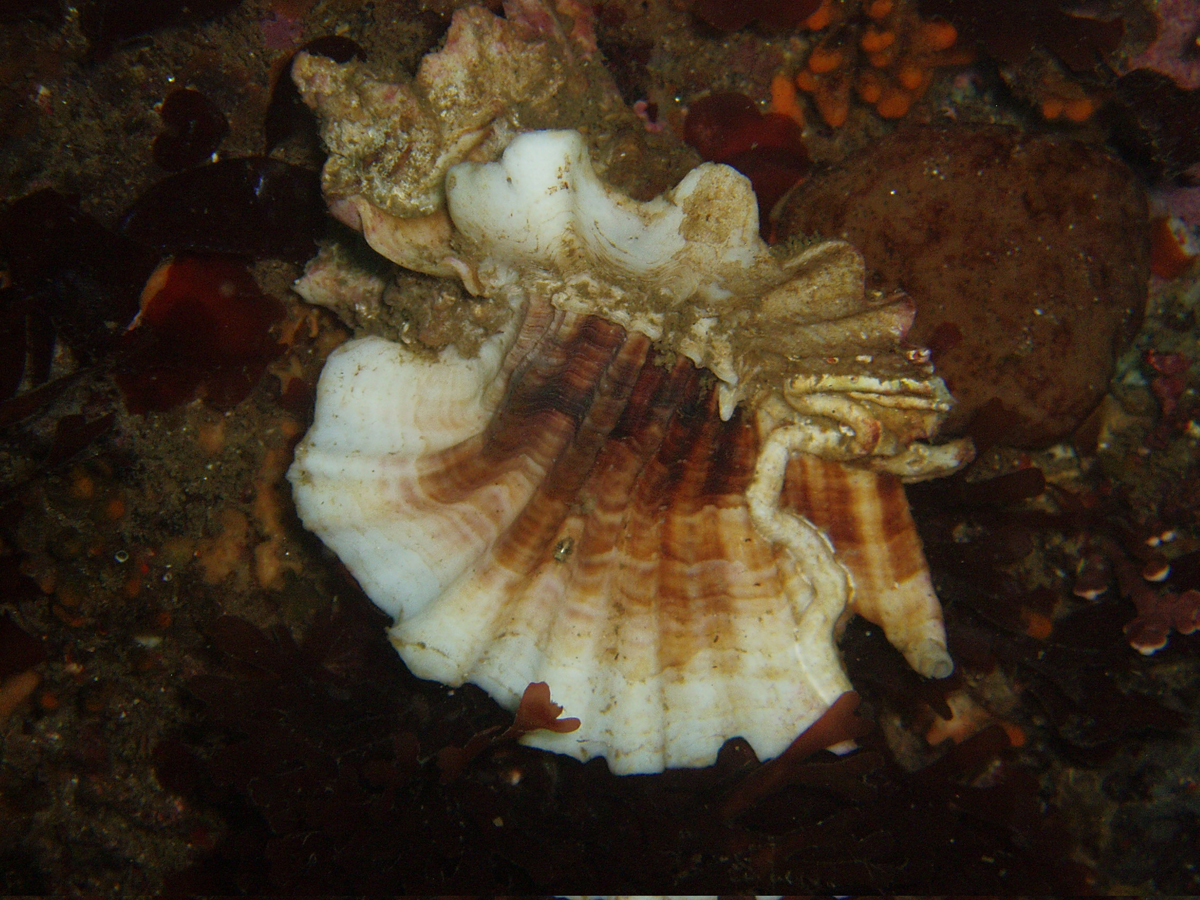
- A live individual of Ceratostoma foliatum, head end towards the lower left

Scientific classification
- Kingdom: Animalia
- Phylum: Mollusca
- Class: Gastropoda
- Subclass: Caenogastropoda
- Order: Neogastropoda
- Superfamily: Muricoidea
- Family: Muricidae
- Subfamily: Ocenebrinae; Cossmann, 1903

Genera
- See text

Synonyms
- Nucellidae Salisbury, 1940

= Ocenebrinae =

Subfamily of gastropods

Ocenebrinae is a taxonomic subfamily of predatory sea snails, marine gastropod mollusks. This subfamily is within the large family Muricidae, which are commonly known as the murex and rock snails.

In one other version of current gastropod taxonomy, three of these genera are grouped by themselves in a small subfamily called Haustrinae.

== Genera ==
Genera within the subfamily Ocenebrinae include:

- Acanthina Fischer von Waldheim, 1807
- Acanthinucella A. H. Cooke, 1918
- Africanella Vermeij & Houart, 1999
- † Argenthina G. S. Herbert & del Rio, 2005
- Austrotrophon Dall, 1902
- Calcitrapessa S. S. Berry, 1959
- † Califostoma J. R. Bean & Vermeij, 2016
- † Carhuaspina DeVries, 2005
- Ceratostoma Herrmannsen, 1846
- Chicocenebra Bouchet & Houart, 1996
- Chorus Bouchet & Houart, 1996
  - Chorus giganteus
- Crassilabrum Jousseaume, 1880
- Eupleura H. Adams & A. Adams, 1853
- † Fenolignum Vermeij & E. H. Vokes, 1997
- Forreria Jousseaume, 1880
- Genkaimurex Kuroda, 1953
- Gracilipurpura Jousseaume, 1880
- Hadriania Bucquoy & Dautzenberg, 1882: synonym of Gracilipurpura Jousseaume, 1880
- † Herminespina DeVries & Vermeij, 1997
- † Heteropurpura Jousseaume, 1880
- Inermicosta Jousseaume, 1880
- Jaton Pusch, 1837
- † Jsowerbya Merle, 2005
- † Lyropurpura Jousseaume, 1880
- Mexacanthina Marko & Vermeij, 1999
- † Miocenebra E. H. Vokes, 1963
- Muregina Vermeij, 1998
- † Namamurex A. Carrington & B. F. Kensley
- Nucella Röding, 1798
- Ocenebra Gray, 1847
- Ocenotrophon McLean, 1995
- Ocinebrellus Jousseaume, 1880
- Ocinebrina Jousseaume, 1880
- Paciocinebrina Houart, Vermeij & Wiedrick, 2019
- Poropteron Jousseaume, 1880
- Pteropurpura Jousseaume, 1880
- Pterorytis Conrad, 1863
- † Pterynopsis E. H. Vokes, 1972
- Roperia Dall, 1898
- † Spinucella Vermeij, 1993
- † Tactilispina DeVries, 2005
- Trochia Swainson, 1840
- Urosalpinx W. Stimpson, 1865
- Vaughtia Houart, 1995
- Vokesinotus Petuch, 1988
- Xanthochorus P. Fischer, 1884
- Zacatrophon Hertlein & Strong, 1951

Fossil genera:

- Ecphora

Gener a brought into synonymy

- Antimurex Cossmann, 1903: synonym of Crassilabrum Jousseaume, 1880
- Centrifuga U. S. Grant & Gale, 1931: synonym of Pteropurpura Jousseaume, 1880
- Cerastoma [sic]: synonym of Cerostoma Conrad, 1837: synonym of Ceratostoma Herrmannsen, 1846 (misspelling of genus)
- Cerostoma Conrad, 1837: synonym of Ceratostoma Herrmannsen, 1846 (invalid: junior homonym of Cerostoma Latreille, 1802 [Lepidoptera]; Ceratostoma is an emendation )
- Dentocenebra Monterosato, 1917: synonym of Ocenebra Gray, 1847
- Hanetia: synonym of Urosalpinx Stimpson, 1865
- Jatova Jousseaume, 1880: synonym of Jaton Pusch, 1837
- Microrhytis: synonym of Ceratostoma Herrmannsen, 1846
- Monoceros Lamarck, 1809: synonym of Acanthina Fischer von Waldheim, 1807 (Invalid: junior homonym of Monoceros Lacépède, 1798 [Pisces] and others)
- Neurarhytis Olsson & Harbison, 1953: synonym of Pterorytis Conrad, 1863
- Ocenebrina Cossmann, 1903: synonym of Ocinebrina Jousseaume, 1880 (invalid: unjustified emendation of Ocinebrina)
- Ocinebra Leach, 1852: synonym of Ocenebra Gray, 1847 (incorrect subsequent spelling)
- Polytropa Swainson, 1840: synonym of Nucella Röding, 1798 (unaccepted > junior subjective synonym)
- Polytropalicus Rovereto, 1899: synonym of Nucella Röding, 1798
- Ocinebrellus: synonym of Pteropurpura Jousseaume, 1880
- Poropteron: synonym of Pteropurpura Jousseaume, 1880
- Rudolpha Schumacher, 1817: synonym of Acanthina Fischer von Waldheim, 1807
- Shaskyus: synonym of Pteropurpura Jousseaume, 1880
- Spinostoma Coen, 1943: synonym of Ceratostoma Herrmannsen, 1846
- Ternaria Coen, 1943: synonym of Pteropurpura (Ocinebrellus) Jousseaume, 1880: synonym of Ocinebrellus Jousseaume, 1880 (not available: no type species designated)
- Tritonalia J. Fleming, 1828: synonym of Ocenebra Gray, 1847 (Invalid: placed on the Official Index by ICZN Opinion 886)
- Unicornus Montfort, 1810: synonym of Acanthina Fischer von Waldheim, 1807
