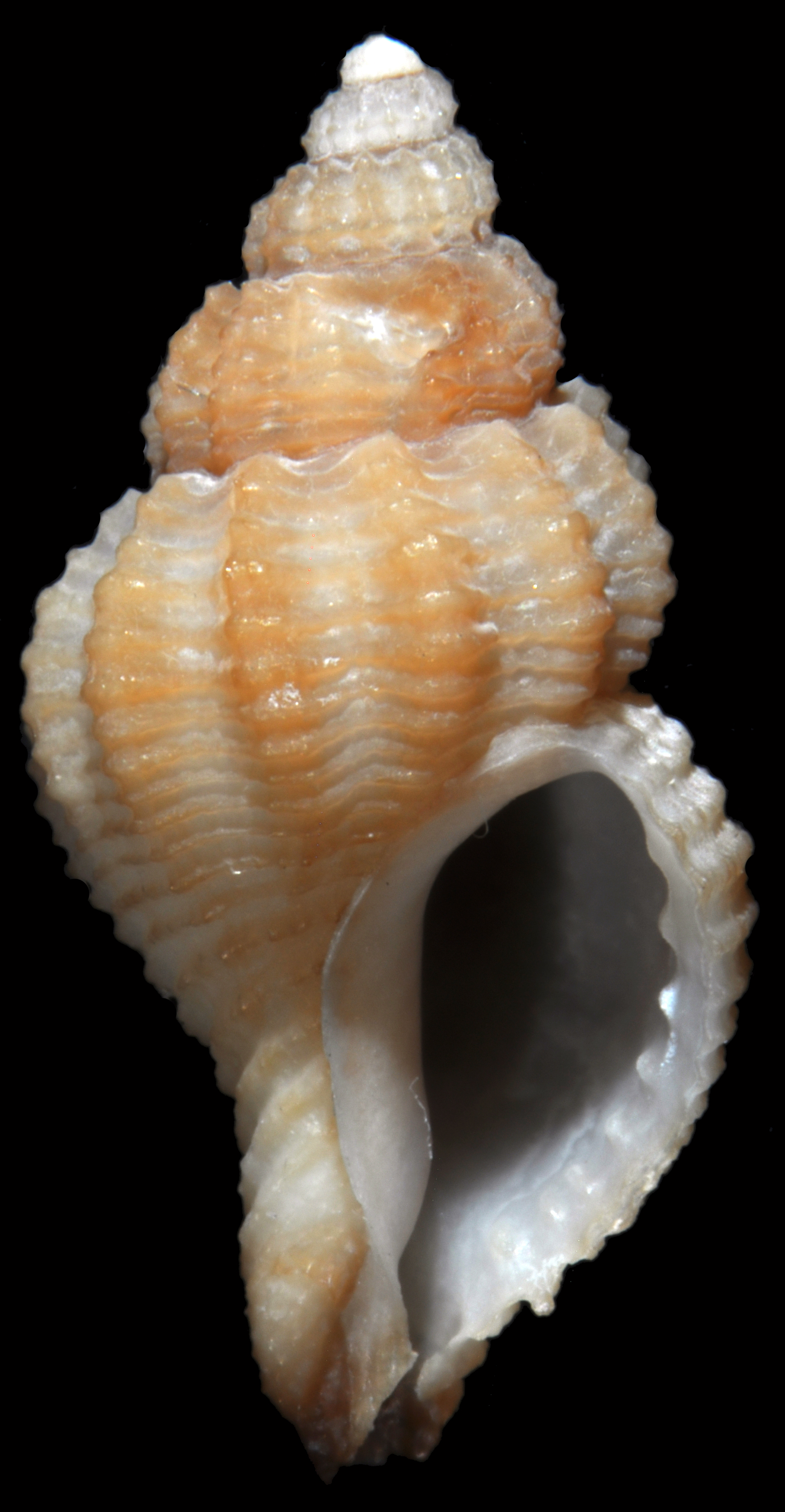
- Shell of Ocinebrina aegeensis (holotype at MNHN, Paris)

Scientific classification
- Kingdom: Animalia
- Phylum: Mollusca
- Class: Gastropoda
- Subclass: Caenogastropoda
- Order: Neogastropoda
- Superfamily: Muricoidea
- Family: Muricidae
- Subfamily: Ocenebrinae
- Genus: Ocinebrina; Jousseaume, 1880

Type species
- Murex corallinus Scacchi, 1836

Synonyms
- Murex (Corallinia) Bucquoy & Dautzenberg, 1882; Ocenebra (Ocinebrina); Ocenebrina Cossmann, 1903; Tritonalia (Ocinebrina) Jousseaume, 1880

= Ocinebrina =

Genus of gastropods

Ocinebrina is a genus of sea snails, marine gastropod mollusks in the subfamily Ocenebrinae of the family Muricidae, the murex snails or rock snails.

== Species ==
The following species are recognised in the genus Ocinebrina:

- Ocinebrina aciculata (Lamarck, 1822)
- Ocinebrina aegeensis Aissaoui, Barco & Oliverio, 2017
- † Ocinebrina ariesiensis (Fontannes, 1879)
- † Ocinebrina bertai Z. Kovács, 2020
- † Ocinebrina bicaudata (Borson, 1821)
- †Ocinebrina carvalhoi (Cox, 1936)
- †Ocinebrina coelata (Dujardin, 1837)
- † Ocinebrina concerpta (Bellardi, 1873)
- † Ocinebrina confluens (Eichwald, 1853)
- Ocinebrina corallina (Scacchi, 1836)
- Ocinebrina corallinoides Pallary, 1912
- † Ocinebrina crassilabiata (Hilber, 1879)
- † Ocinebrina dertonensis (Bellardi, 1873)
- †Ocinebrina houarti Landau, Merle, Ceulemans & Van Dingenen, 2019
- † Ocinebrina imbricata (Brocchi, 1814)
- † Ocinebrina kojumdgievae (Bałuk, 1995)
- †Ocinebrina landaui Z. Kovács, 2019
- †Ocinebrina lauriatrageae Ceulemans, van Dingenen, Merle & Landau, 2016
- † Ocinebrina perparva Landau, Harzhauser, İslamoğlu & Silva, 2013
- † Ocinebrina polonica (Bałuk, 1995)
- † Ocinebrina recognita Bałuk, 2006
- Ocinebrina reinai Bonomolo & Crocetta, 2012
- † Ocinebrina renieri (Michelotti, 1847)
- † Ocinebrina scalaris (Brocchi, 1814)
- † Ocinebrina sublavata (Basterot, 1825)

== Synonyms ==
- Ocinebrina barbarensis (Gabb, 1865): synonym of Paciocinebrina barbarensis (Gabb, 1865)
- Ocinebrina blainvillei [sic]: synonym of Muricopsis cristata (Brocchi, 1814) (misspelling of Ocinebrina blainvillii (Payraudeau, 1826))
- Ocinebrina blainvillii (Payraudeau, 1826): synonym of Muricopsis cristata (Brocchi, 1814)
- Ocinebrina buzzurroi Cecalupo & Mariani, 2008: synonym of Ocinebrina corallinoides Pallary, 1912
- Ocinebrina carmelae Cecalupo, Buzzurro & Mariani, 2008: synonym of Ocinebrina piantonii Cecalupo, Buzzurro & Mariani, 2008: synonym of Ocenebra piantonii (Cecalupo, Buzzurro & Mariani, 2008)
- Ocinebrina cellulosa (Conrad, 1846): synonym of Favartia cellulosa (Conrad, 1846)
- Ocinebrina cyclopus Monterosato, 1884: synonym of Ocinebrina edwardsii (Payraudeau, 1826): synonym of Ocenebra edwardsii (Payraudeau, 1826)
- Ocinebrina edwardsi [sic]: synonym of Ocinebrina edwardsii (Payraudeau, 1826): synonym of Ocenebra edwardsii (Payraudeau, 1826) (misspelling of Ocinebrina edwardsii (Payraudeau, 1826))
- Ocinebrina edwardsi (Payraudeau, 1826): synonym of Ocenebra edwardsii (Payraudeau, 1826)
- Ocinebrina edwardsii (Payraudeau, 1826): synonym of Ocenebra edwardsii (Payraudeau, 1826)
- Ocinebrina epiphanea (Dall, 1919): synonym of Paciocinebrina foveolata (Hinds, 1844)
- Ocinebrina erronea (Settepassi, 1977): synonym of Ocinebrina hispidula (Pallary, 1904): synonym of Ocenebra hispidula (Pallary, 1904) (unavailable following ICZN art. 11.4)
- Ocinebrina foveolata (Hinds, 1844): synonym of Paciocinebrina foveolata (Hinds, 1844)
- Ocinebrina gracillima (Stearns, 1871): synonym of Paciocinebrina gracillima (Stearns, 1871)
- Ocinebrina helleri (Brusina, 1865): synonym of Ocenebra helleri (Brusina, 1865)
- Ocinebrina hispidula (Pallary, 1904): synonym of Ocenebra hispidula (Pallary, 1904)
- Ocinebrina hybrida (Aradas & Benoit, 1876): synonym of Ocenebra hybrida (Aradas & Benoit, 1876)
- Ocinebrina ingloria (Crosse, 1865): synonym of Ocenebra ingloria (Crosse, 1865)
- Ocinebrina inordinata (Houart & Abreu, 1994): synonym of Ocenebra inordinata Houart & Abreu, 1994
- Ocinebrina interfossa (Carpenter, 1864): synonym of Paciocinebrina interfossa (Carpenter, 1864)
- Ocinebrina leukos Houart, 2000: synonym of Ocenebra leukos (Houart, 2000) (original combination)
- Ocinebrina lucasi Bozzetti, 2007: synonym of Murexsul planiliratus (Reeve, 1845) (synonym)
- Ocinebrina lurida (Middendorff, 1848): synonym of Paciocinebrina lurida (Middendorff, 1848)
- Ocinebrina miscowichae Pallary, 1920: synonym of Ocenebra miscowichae (Pallary, 1920) (original combination)
- Ocinebrina miscowichi Pallary, 1920: synonym of Ocinebrina miscowichae Pallary, 1920: synonym of Ocenebra miscowichae (Pallary, 1920) (must be emended to miscowichae following ICZN rules)
- Ocinebrina nicolai Monterosato, 1884: synonym of Ocenebra nicolai (Monterosato, 1884) (original combination)
- Ocinebrina paddeui Bonomolo & Buzzurro, 2006: synonym of Ocenebra paddeui (Bonomolo & Buzzurro, 2006) (original combination)
- Ocinebrina perfecta Monterosato in Settepassi, 1977: synonym of Ocinebrina helleri (Brusina, 1865): synonym of Ocenebra helleri (Brusina, 1865) (unavailable following ICZN art. 11.4)
- Ocinebrina piantonii Cecalupo, Buzzurro & Mariani, 2008: synonym of Ocenebra piantonii (Cecalupo, Buzzurro & Mariani, 2008) (original combination)
- Ocinebrina purpuroidea Pallary, 1920: synonym of Ocenebra purpuroidea (Pallary, 1920) (original combination)
- Ocinebrina ruderata Settepassi, 1977: synonym of Ocinebrina edwardsii (Payraudeau, 1826): synonym of Ocenebra edwardsii (Payraudeau, 1826) (not available, published in a work which does not consistently use binomial nomenclature (ICZN art. 11.4))
- Ocinebrina scalaropsis Settepassi, 1977: synonym of Ocinebrina aciculata (Lamarck, 1822) (unavailable following ICZN art. 11.4)
- Ocinebrina scaloropsis Settepassi, 1977: synonym of Ocinebrina edwardsii (Payraudeau, 1826): synonym of Ocenebra edwardsii (Payraudeau, 1826) (not available, published in a work which does not consistently use binomial nomenclature (ICZN art. 11.4))
- Ocinebrina sclera (Dall, 1919): synonym of Paciocinebrina sclera (Dall, 1919)
- Ocinebrina seftoni (Chace, 1958): synonym of Paciocinebrina seftoni (Chace, 1958)
- † Ocinebrina squamulifera (Carpenter, 1869): synonym of † Paciocinebrina squamulifera (Carpenter, 1869)
- Ocinebrina titii (Stossich, 1865): synonym of Ocinebrina corallina (Scacchi, 1836)
