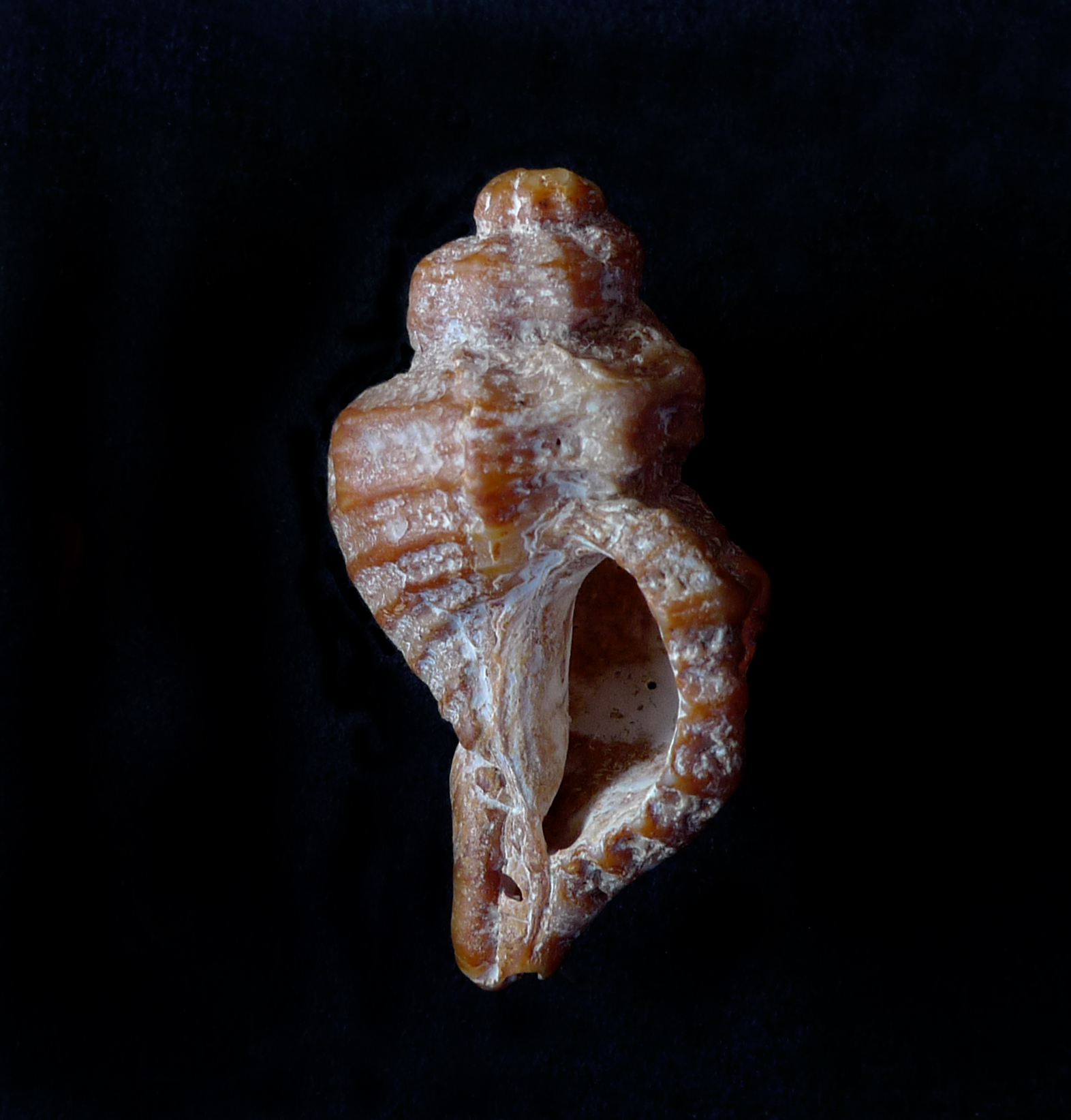
- A beachworn shell of Ocenebra erinaceus

Scientific classification
- Kingdom: Animalia
- Phylum: Mollusca
- Class: Gastropoda
- Subclass: Caenogastropoda
- Order: Neogastropoda
- Superfamily: Muricoidea
- Family: Muricidae
- Subfamily: Ocenebrinae
- Genus: Ocenebra; Gray, 1847

Type species
- Murex erinaceus Linnaeus, 1758

Synonyms
- Dentocenebra Monterosato, 1917; Murex (Ocenebra); Murex (Ocinebra); Ocenebra (Ocenebra) Gray, 1847; Ocinebra Leach, 1852 (incorrect subsequent spelling); Tritonalia Fleming, 1828 (Invalid: placed on the Official Index by ICZN Opinion 886)

= Ocenebra =

Genus of gastropods

Ocenebra is a genus of predatory sea snails, marine gastropod mollusks in the subfamily Ocenebrinae of the family Muricidae, the murex and rock snails.

== Species ==
Species with accepted names within the genus Ocenebra include according to the World Register of Marine Species (WoRMS) :

- Ocenebra aparicioae Cunningham Aparicio, 2020
- Ocenebra brevirobusta Houart, 2000
- Ocenebra chavesi Houart, 1996
- Ocenebra edwardsii (Payraudeau, 1826)
- Ocenebra erinaceus (Linnaeus, 1758)
- † Ocenebra etteri Landau & Houart, 2014
- Ocenebra helleri (Brusina, 1865)
- Ocenebra hispidula (Pallary, 1904)
- Ocenebra hybrida (Aradas & Benoit, 1876)
- Ocenebra ingloria (Crosse, 1865)
- Ocenebra inordinata Houart & Abreu, 1994
- Ocenebra leukos (Houart, 2000)
- Ocenebra miscowichae (Pallary, 1920)
- Ocenebra nicolai (Monterosato, 1884)
- Ocenebra paddeui (Bonomolo & Buzzurro, 2006)
- Ocenebra piantonii (Cecalupo, Buzzurro & Mariani, 2008)
- † Ocenebra prionotus (Tate, 1888)
- Ocenebra purpuroidea (Pallary, 1920)
- Ocenebra salahi T. Cossignani & Ahuir, 2021
- Ocenebra vazzanai Crocetta, Houart & Bonomolo, 2020
- †Ocenebra vindobonensis (Hörnes, 1853)

Species inquirendum

- Ocenebra juritzi (Barnard, 1969)

Species brought into synonymy

- Ocenebra acanthophora (A. Adams, 1863): synonym of Ocinebrellus acanthophorus (A. Adams, 1863)
- Ocenebra angolensis Odhner, 1922: synonym of Orania fusulus (Brocchi, 1814) (synonym)
- Ocenebra atropurpurea Carpenter, 1865: synonym of Paciocinebrina atropurpurea (Carpenter, 1865) (original combination)
- Ocenebra brevirostra [sic]: synonym of Ocenebra brevirobusta Houart, 2000 (lapsus in abstract)
- Ocenebra cala (Pilsbry, 1897): synonym of Urosalpinx cala (Pilsbry, 1897) (unaccepted combination)
- Ocenebra circumtexta Stearns, 1871: synonym of Paciocinebrina circumtexta (Stearns, 1871)
- Ocenebra contracta (Reeve, 1846) synonym of Ergalatax contracta (Reeve, 1846)
- Ocenebra coseli Houart, 1989: synonym of Africanella coseli (Houart, 1989) (original combination)
- Ocenebra crispatissima Berry, 1953: synonym of Paciocinebrina crispatissima (Berry, 1953) (original combination)
- Ocenebra erinacea (Linnaeus, 1758) - sting winkle : synonym of Ocenebra erinaceus (Linnaeus, 1758) but still: synonym of a valid name by the ICZN (Op. 886)
- Ocenebra erronea (Monterosato in Poirier, 1883): synonym of Ocinebrina hispidula (Pallary, 1904): synonym of Ocenebra hispidula (Pallary, 1904)
- Ocenebra fairiana Houart, 1979: synonym of Pteropurpura fairiana (Houart, 1979) (original combination)
- Ocenebra fasciata (G. B. Sowerby II, 1841): synonym of Inermicosta inermicosta (Vokes, 1964)
- Ocenebra fenestrata : synonym of Muricodrupa fenestrata (Blainville, 1832)
- Ocenebra erronea (Monterosato in Poirier, 1883): synonym of Ocinebrina hispidula (Pallary, 1904): synonym of Ocenebra hispidula (Pallary, 1904)
- Ocenebra fairiana Houart, 1979: synonym of Pteropurpura fairiana (Houart, 1979) (original combination)
- Ocenebra fasciata (G. B. Sowerby II, 1841): synonym of Inermicosta inermicosta (Vokes, 1964)
- Ocenebra gibbosa (Lamarck, 1822): synonym of Jaton decussatus (Gmelin, 1791)
- Ocenebra hayesi Lorenz, 1995: synonym of Vaughtia hayesi (Lorenz, 1995) (original combination)
- Ocenebra inermicosta Vokes, 1964 : synonym of Inermicosta inermicosta (Vokes, 1964)
- Ocenebra inornata (Récluz, 1851): synonym of Ocinebrellus inornatus (Récluz, 1851)
- Ocenebra interfossa Carpenter, 1864: synonym of Paciocinebrina interfossa (Carpenter, 1864) (original combination)
- Ocenebra intermedia (C. B. Adams, 1850): synonym of Favartia alveata (Kiener, 1842)
- Ocenebra isaacsi Houart, 1984: synonym of Africanella isaacsi (Houart, 1984) (original combination)
- Ocenebra jenksii F. C. Baker, 1889: synonym of Haustrum vinosum (Lamarck, 1822): synonym of Bedeva vinosa (Lamarck, 1822) (synonym)
- Ocenebra keenae Bormann, 1946: synonym of Paciocinebrina barbarensis (Gabb, 1865)
- † Ocenebra keepi Arnold, 1903 : synonym of † Paciocinebrina squamulifera (Carpenter, 1869)
- Ocenebra levicula (Dall, 1889): synonym of Favartia levicula (Dall, 1889)
- Ocenebra lumaria Yokoyama, 1926: synonym of Ocinebrellus lumarius (Yokoyama, 1926) (original combination)
- Ocenebra lurida (Middendorff, 1848): synonym of Paciocinebrina lurida (Middendorff, 1848)
- Ocenebra michaeli Ford, 1888: synonym of Urosalpinx subangulata (Stearns, 1873)
- Ocenebra minor (Dall, 1919): synonym of Paciocinebrina minor (Dall, 1919)
- Ocenebra newmani Lorenz, 1990: synonym of Vaughtia dunkeri (F. Krauss, 1848)
- Ocenebra poulsoni Carpenter, 1864: synonym of Roperia poulsoni (Carpenter, 1864) (original combination)
- Ocenebra purpuroides (Reeve, 1845): synonym of Vaughtia purpuroides (Reeve, 1845)
- Ocenebra rosea (Reeve, 1846): synonym of Muricopsis rosea (Reeve, 1846)
- Ocenebra rubra F. C. Baker, 1891: synonym of Paciocinebrina atropurpurea (Carpenter, 1865)
- Ocenebra sclera (Dall, 1919) : synonym of Paciocinebrina sclera (Dall, 1919)
- Ocenebra scrobiculata (Philippi, 1846): synonym of Vaughtia scrobiculata (Dunker, 1846)
- Ocenebra seftoni Chace, 1958: synonym of Paciocinebrina seftoni (Chace, 1958) (original combination)
- Ocenebra sloati Hertlein, 1958: synonym of Coralliophila orcuttiana Dall, 1919
- Ocenebra sperata (Cossmann, 1921): synonym of Urosalpinx sperata (Cossmann, 1921): synonym of Hadriania sperata (Cossmann, 1921)
- Ocenebra subangulata (Stearns, 1873) : synonym of Urosalpinx subangulata (Stearns, 1873)
- Ocenebra wardiana F. C. Baker, 1891: synonym of Ocinebrina aciculata (Lamarck, 1822)
