= Roperia =

Roperia is the scientific name for two different genera of organisms and may refer to:

- Roperia (gastropod) Dall, 1898 is genus of sea snails in the family Muricidae. There is only one species in the genus: Roperia poulsoni (Carpenter, 1864).
- Roperia (diatom) Grunow ex Peletan, 1889 is a genus of marine diatoms in the family Hemidiscaceae. There is only one species in the genus: Roperia tesselata (Roper) Grunow ex Pelletan, 1889.
