= Ocinebrellus falcatus =

Scientific classification
- Kingdom: Animalia
- Phylum: Mollusca
- Class: Gastropoda
- Subclass: Caenogastropoda
- Order: Neogastropoda
- Family: Muricidae
- Genus: Ocinebrellus
- Species: O. falcatus

Binomial name
- Ocinebrellus falcatus (G.B. Sowerby II, 1834)

Synonyms
- Murex aduncus G.B. Sowerby II, 1834; Murex caliginosus Reeve, 1845; Murex eurypteron Reeve, 1845; Murex falcatus Sowerby, 1834; Ocinebra falcata (G. B. Sowerby II, 1834); Ocinebrellus aduncus (G. B. Sowerby II, 1834); Ocinebrellus eurypteron (Reeve, 1845); Phyllonotus coronatus A. Adams, 1863 (nomen dubium); Phyllonotus unifasciatus A. Adams, 1863 (nomen dubium); Pteropurpura (Ocinebrellus) falcata (G. B. Sowerby II, 1834); Pteropurpura adunca (G. B. Sowerby II, 1834); Pteropurpura adunca adunca (G. B. Sowerby II, 1834); Pteropurpura falcata (G. B. Sowerby II, 1834)

Species of gastropod

Ocinebrellus falcatus is a species of sea snail, a marine gastropod mollusk in the family Muricidae, the murex snails or rock snails.
