= Paciocinebrina grippi =

Scientific classification
- Kingdom: Animalia
- Phylum: Mollusca
- Class: Gastropoda
- Subclass: Caenogastropoda
- Order: Neogastropoda
- Family: Muricidae
- Genus: Paciocinebrina
- Species: P. grippi

Binomial name
- Paciocinebrina grippi (Dall, 1911)

Synonyms
- Eupleura grippi Dall, 1911; Urosalpinx grippi (Dall, 1911)

Species of gastropod

Paciocinebrina grippi is a species of sea snail, a marine gastropod mollusc in the family Muricidae, the murex snails or rock snails.

== Distribution ==
This marine species occurs off San Diego, California.
