= Ocinebrina aciculata =

- Ocinebrina aciculata shell

Scientific classification
- Kingdom: Animalia
- Phylum: Mollusca
- Class: Gastropoda
- Subclass: Caenogastropoda
- Order: Neogastropoda
- Family: Muricidae
- Genus: Ocinebrina
- Species: O. aciculata

Binomial name
- Ocinebrina aciculata (Lamarck, 1822)

Synonyms
- Fusus acrisius Nardo, 1847; Fusus titii Stossich, 1865; Murex aciculatus Lamarck, 1822 (basionym); Murex corallinus Scacchi, 1836; Murex inconspicuus G.B. Sowerby II, 1841; Murex pistacia Reeve, 1845; Murex subaciculatus Locard, 1886; Ocenebra wardiana F.C. Baker, 1891; Ocinebrina aciculata aciculata (Lamarck, 1822); Ocinebrina scalaropsis Settepassi, 1977

Species of gastropod

Ocinebrina aciculata is a species of sea snail, a marine gastropod mollusc in the family Muricidae, the murex snails or rock snails.

== Subspecies and varieties ==
- Ocinebrina aciculata aciculata (Lamarck, 1822): synonym of Ocinebrina aciculata (synonyms: Fusus gyrinus Brown, 1827; Fusus lavatus Philippi, 1836; Murex aciculatus var. curta Monterosato in Bucquoy, Dautzenberg & Dollfus, 1882; Murex aciculatus var. elongata Monterosato, 1878; Murex aciculatus var. minor Monterosato in B. D. & D., 1882; Ocinebrina aciculata var. cingulifera Pallary, 1920; Ocinebrina aciculata var. scalariformis Monterosato in Coen, 1933; Ocinebrina corallinus var. major Pallary, 1900; Ocinebrina titii (Stossich, 1865); Ocinebrina titii minor Monterosato in Settepassi, 1977)
- Ocinebrina aciculata corallinoides Pallary, 1912: synonym of Ocinebrina corallinoides Pallary, 1912
- Ocinebrina aciculata var. cingulifera Pallary, 1920 : synonym of Ocinebrina aciculata (Lamarck, 1822)
- Ocinebrina aciculata var. scalariformis Monterosato in Coen, 1933: synonym of Ocinebrina aciculata (Lamarck, 1822)

== Distribution ==
This species occurs in the following locations:

- European waters
- Mediterranean Sea+
- Northeast Atlantic Ocean: Azores
