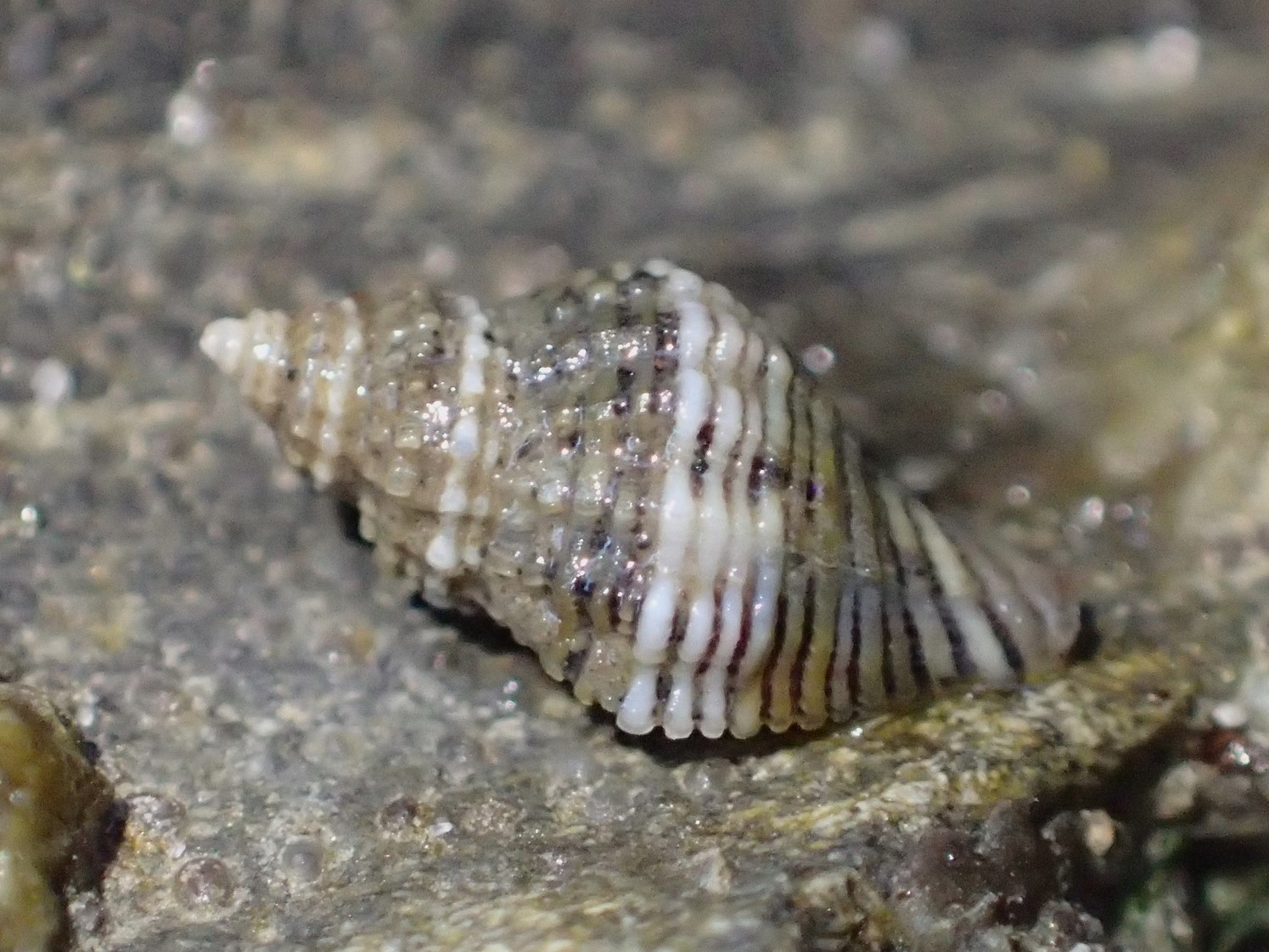
- Paciocinebrina gracillima

Scientific classification
- Kingdom: Animalia
- Phylum: Mollusca
- Class: Gastropoda
- Subclass: Caenogastropoda
- Order: Neogastropoda
- Superfamily: Muricoidea
- Family: Muricidae
- Subfamily: Ocenebrinae
- Genus: Paciocinebrina; Houart, Vermeij & Wiedrick, 2019

Type species
- Tritonium luridum Middendorff, 1848

= Paciocinebrina =

Genus of gastropod

Paciocinebrina is a genus of sea snail, a marine gastropod mollusk in the family Muricidae, the murex snails or rock snails.

== Species ==
The World Register of Marine Species accepts the following species within Paciocinebrina:

- Paciocinebrina atropurpurea (Carpenter, 1865)
- Paciocinebrina barbarensis (Gabb, 1865)
- Paciocinebrina benitoensis Houart, Vermeij & Wiedrick, 2019
- Paciocinebrina bormannae Wiedrick & Houart, 2020
- Paciocinebrina circumtexta (Stearns, 1871)
- Paciocinebrina crispatissima (Berry, 1953)
- Paciocinebrina foveolata (Hinds, 1844)
- Paciocinebrina fraseri (Oldroyd, 1920)
- Paciocinebrina gracillima (Stearns, 1871)
- Paciocinebrina grandilurida Wiedrick & Houart, 2020
- Paciocinebrina grippi (Dall, 1911)
- Paciocinebrina interfossa (Carpenter, 1864)
- Paciocinebrina lurida (Middendorff, 1848)
- Paciocinebrina macleani Houart, Vermeij & Wiedrick, 2019
- Paciocinebrina mininterfossa Wiedrick & Houart, 2020
- Paciocinebrina minor (Dall, 1919)
- Paciocinebrina munda (Carpenter, 1864)
- Paciocinebrina murphyorum Wiedrick & Houart, 2020
- Paciocinebrina neobarbarensis Houart, Vermeij & Wiedrick, 2019
- Paciocinebrina pseudomunda Houart, Vermeij & Wiedrick, 2019
- Paciocinebrina pseudopusilla Wiedrick & Houart, 2020
- Paciocinebrina pusilla Wiedrick & Houart, 2020
- Paciocinebrina sclera (Dall, 1919)
- Paciocinebrina seftoni (Chace, 1958)
- †Paciocinebrina squamulifera (Carpenter, 1869)
- Paciocinebrina thelmacrowae Houart, Vermeij & Wiedrick, 2019
