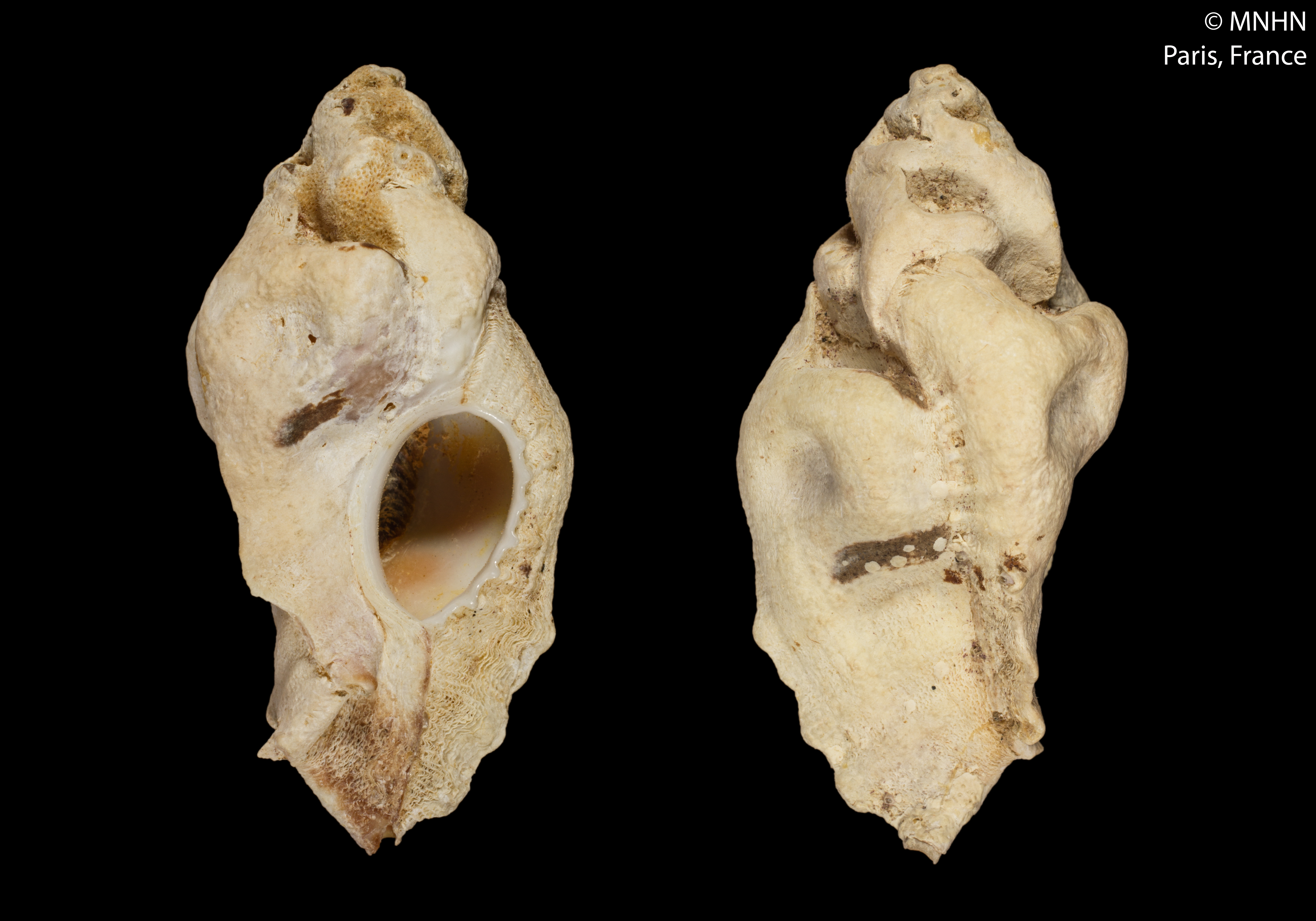

Scientific classification
- Kingdom: Animalia
- Phylum: Mollusca
- Class: Gastropoda
- Subclass: Caenogastropoda
- Order: Neogastropoda
- Family: Muricidae
- Genus: Jaton
- Species: J. sinespina

Binomial name
- Jaton sinespina Vermeij & Houart, 1996

Synonyms
- Jaton decussatus var. angolensis Ryall, 1984 (Unavailable name: established as a variety after 1960)

= Jaton sinespina =

Species of gastropod

Jaton sinespina is a species of sea snail, a marine gastropod mollusk family Muricidae, the murex snails or rock snails.
