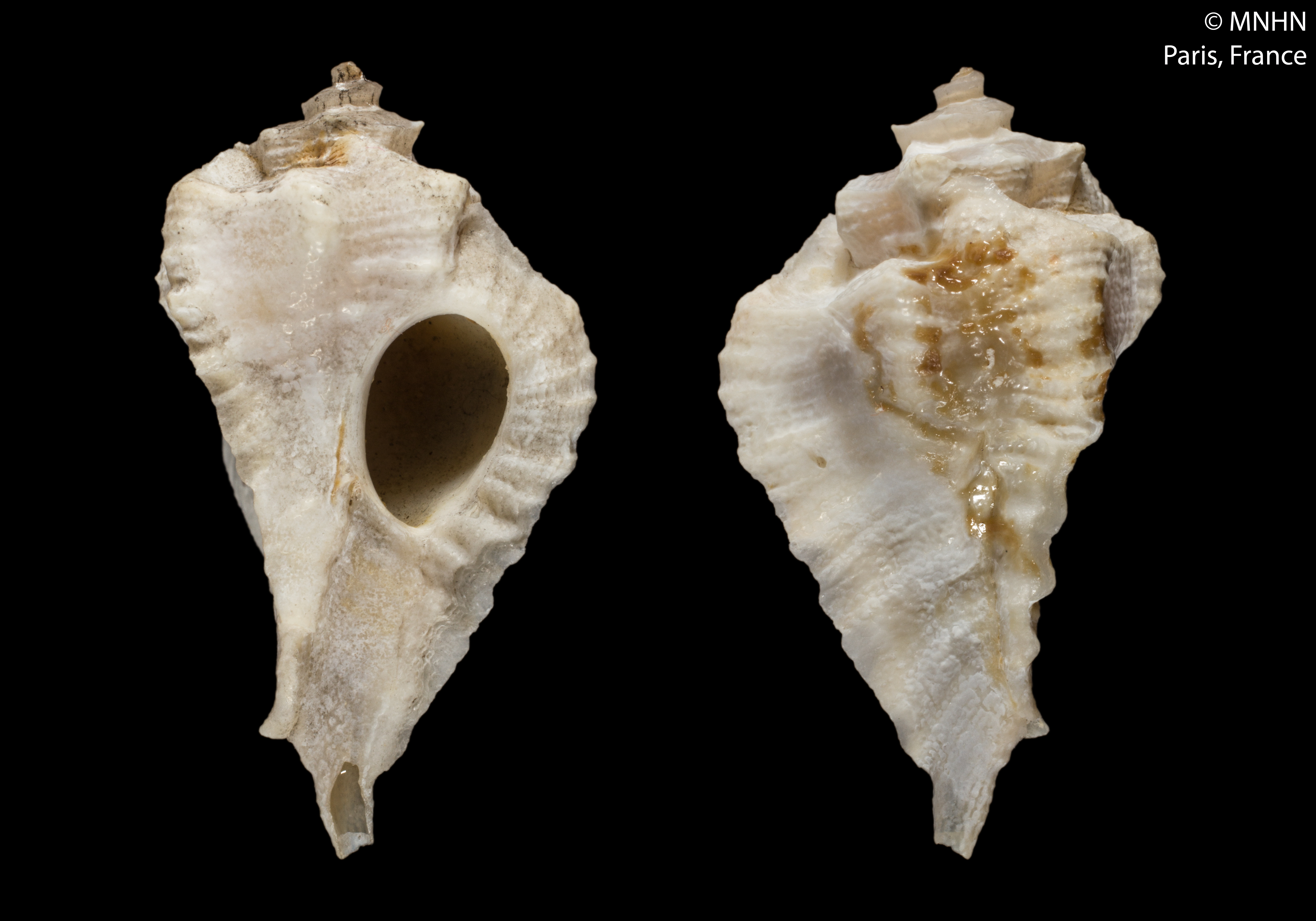

Scientific classification
- Kingdom: Animalia
- Phylum: Mollusca
- Class: Gastropoda
- Subclass: Caenogastropoda
- Order: Neogastropoda
- Family: Muricidae
- Genus: Jaton
- Species: J. hemitripterus

Binomial name
- Jaton hemitripterus (Lamarck, 1816)

Synonyms
- Jaton rikae Petuch & Berschauer, 2019; Jaton westsahariensis Franchi, 2007; Murex hemitripterus Lamarck, 1816

= Jaton hemitripterus =

Species of gastropod

Jaton hemitripterus is a species of sea snail, a marine gastropod mollusk in the family Muricidae, the murex snails or rock snails.
