= Ocinebrellus =

Scientific classification
- Kingdom: Animalia
- Phylum: Mollusca
- Class: Gastropoda
- Subclass: Caenogastropoda
- Order: Neogastropoda
- Superfamily: Muricoidea
- Family: Muricidae
- Subfamily: Ocenebrinae
- Genus: Ocinebrellus; Jousseaume, 1880

Type species
- Murex eurypteron Reeve, 1845

Synonyms
- Ocenebra (Ocinebrellus) Jousseaume, 1880; Pteropurpura (Ocinebrellus) Jousseaume, 1880; Ternaria Coen, 1943 (not available: no type species designated)

Genus of gastropods

Ocinebrellus is a genus of predatory sea snails, marine gastropod mollusks in the subfamily Ocenebrinae of the family Muricidae, the murex and rock snails.

== Species ==
- Ocinebrellus acanthophorus (A. Adams, 1863)
- Ocinebrellus falcatus (G. B. Sowerby II, 1834)
- Ocinebrellus inornatus (Récluz, 1851)
- Ocinebrellus lumarius (Yokoyama, 1926)
- † Ocinebrellus ogasawarai Amano & Vermeij, 1998
- † Ocinebrellus protoaduncus Hatai & Kotaka, 1959

Species brought into synonymy

- Ocinebrellus aduncus (G. B. Sowerby II, 1834): synonym of Ocinebrellus falcatus (G. B. Sowerby II, 1834)
- Ocinebrellus eurypteron (Reeve, 1845): synonym of Ocinebrellus falcatus (G. B. Sowerby II, 1834)
