= Ocenebra chavesi =

Scientific classification
- Kingdom: Animalia
- Phylum: Mollusca
- Class: Gastropoda
- Subclass: Caenogastropoda
- Order: Neogastropoda
- Family: Muricidae
- Genus: Ocenebra
- Species: O. chavesi

Binomial name
- Ocenebra chavesi Houart, 1996

Species of gastropod

Ocenebra chavesi is a species of sea snail, a marine gastropod mollusc in the family Muricidae, the murex snails or rock snails.
