= Jaton =

Scientific classification
- Kingdom: Animalia
- Phylum: Mollusca
- Class: Gastropoda
- Subclass: Caenogastropoda
- Order: Neogastropoda
- Superfamily: Muricoidea
- Family: Muricidae
- Subfamily: Ocenebrinae
- Genus: Jaton; Pusch, 1837

Type species
- Murex decussatus Gmelin, 1791

Synonyms
- Jatova Jousseaume, 1880; Murex (Jaton) Pusch, 1837 (superseded combination)

Genus of gastropods

Jaton is a genus of sea snails, marine gastropod mollusks in the subfamily Ocenebrinae of the family Muricidae, and murex snails or rock snails.

== Species ==
Species within the genus Jaton include:

- Jaton decussatus (Gmelin, 1791)
- † Jaton dufrenoyi (Grateloup, 1845)
- Jaton flavidus (Jousseaume, 1874)
- Jaton hemitripterus (Lamarck, 1816)
- Jaton sinespina Vermeij & Houart, 1996
- † Jaton sowerbyi (Michelotti, 1841)

Species brought into synonymy

- Jaton angolensis Ryan, 1984: synonym of Jaton sinespina Vermeij & Houart, 1996
- Jaton rikae Petuch & Berschauer, 2019: synonym of Jaton hemitripterus (Lamarck, 1816)
- Jaton westsahariensis Franchi, 2007: synonym of Jaton hemitripterus (Lamarck, 1816)
