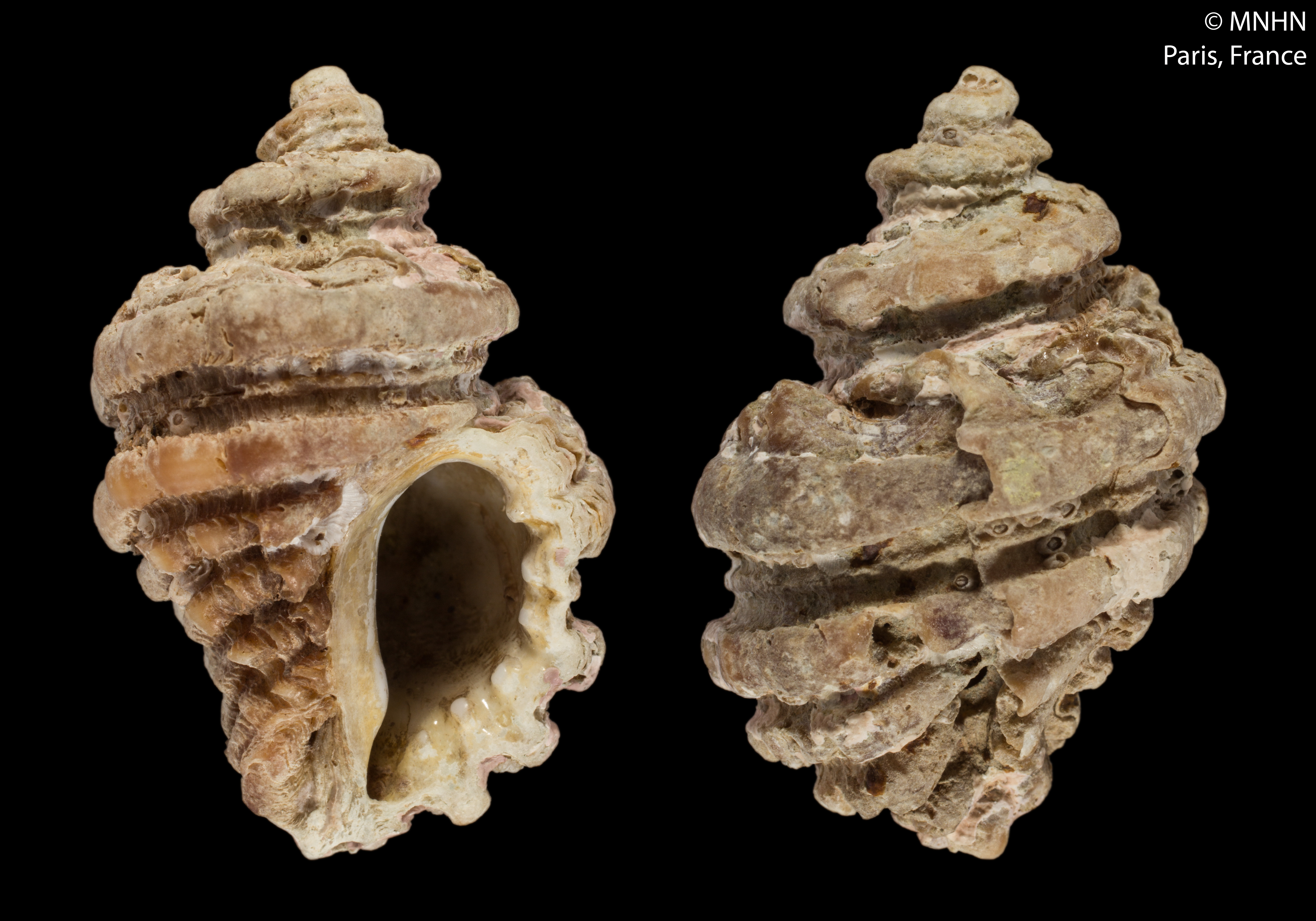
- Shell of Ocenebra brevirobusta (holotype at MNHN, Paris)

Scientific classification
- Kingdom: Animalia
- Phylum: Mollusca
- Class: Gastropoda
- Subclass: Caenogastropoda
- Order: Neogastropoda
- Family: Muricidae
- Genus: Ocenebra
- Species: O. brevirobusta

Binomial name
- Ocenebra brevirobusta Houart, 2000

Synonyms
- Ocenebra brevirostra [sic] (lapsus in abstract)

= Ocenebra brevirobusta =

Species of gastropod

Ocenebra brevirobusta is a species of sea snail, a marine gastropod mollusc in the family Muricidae, commonly known as murex snails or rock snails.

== Etymology ==
The term brevirobusta comes from Latin. Brevis means short; Robusta means strong.

== Description ==
Its shell can grow up to 42 mm (1.65 inches) in length.

== Distribution ==
This marine species occurs off Morocco.
