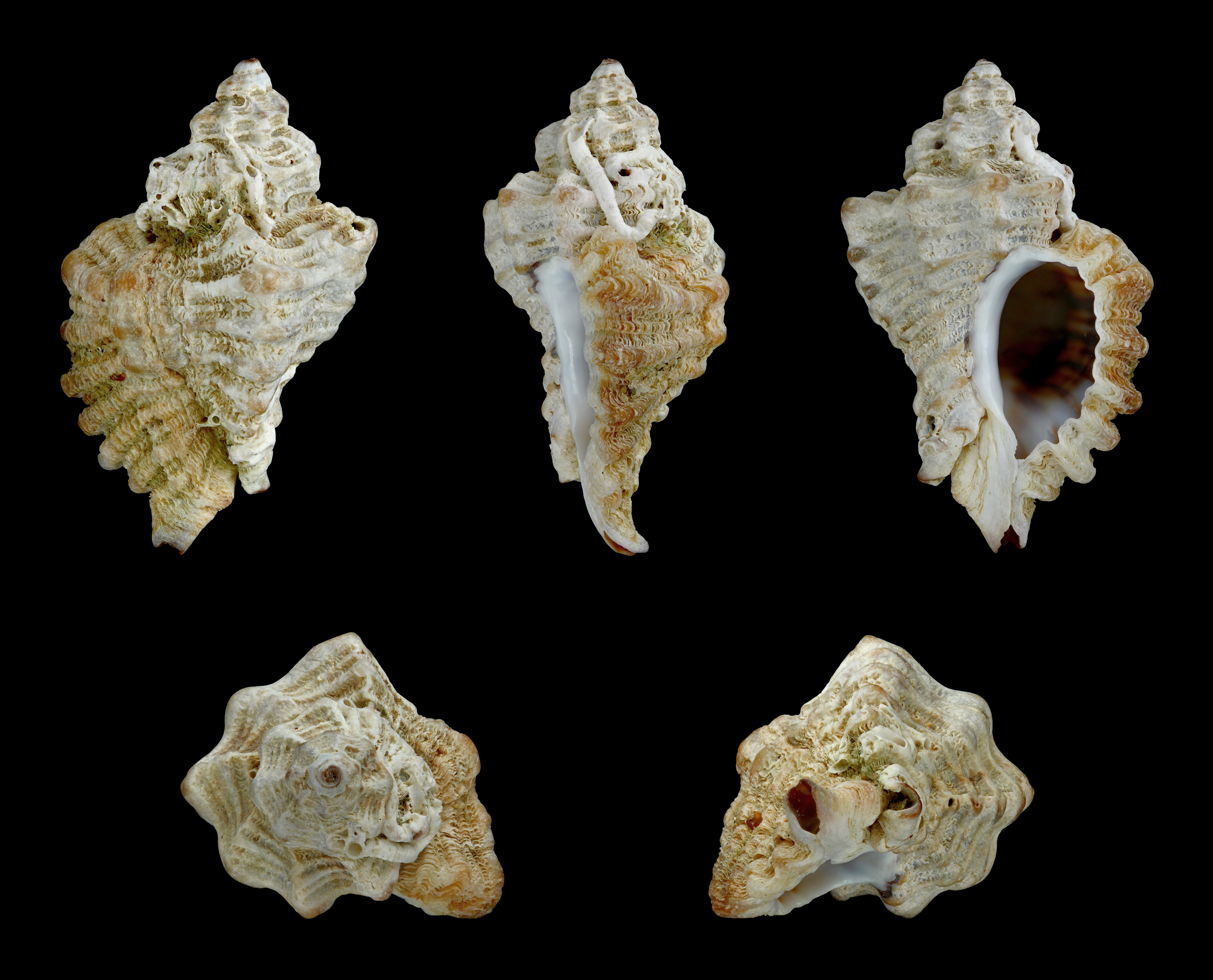
- A shell of Ocenebra erinaceus

Scientific classification
- Kingdom: Animalia
- Phylum: Mollusca
- Class: Gastropoda
- Subclass: Caenogastropoda
- Order: Neogastropoda
- Family: Muricidae
- Genus: Ocenebra
- Species: O. erinaceus

Binomial name
- Ocenebra erinaceus (Linnaeus, 1758)

= Ocenebra erinaceus =

Species of gastropod

Ocenebra erinaceus, common name the European sting winkle, is a species of predatory sea snail, a marine gastropod mollusc in the family Muricidae, the murex and rock snails. Also known as the oyster drill, it is a pest in oyster beds.

The name Ocenebra erinaceus is the accepted name according to the database World Register of Marine Species (WoRMS), and the name is also accepted as valid by the ICZN (Op. 886)

== Description ==
The size of the shell varies between 8 mm and 65 mm. The shell has four to seven varicose, nodulous, encircled by prominent cord-like, raised ribs. These are alternately smaller, the smaller ones minutely scabrous. The varices are sometimes frondose, sometimes lamellated, occasionally appressed. Occasionally the larger revolving ribs thickly overlap the varices, forming a succession of elongated nodules The color of the shell is yellowish-brown and whitish within.

== Distribution ==
This marine species occurs in European waters from Norway to the Black Sea; in the Atlantic Ocean off the Azores and Madeira

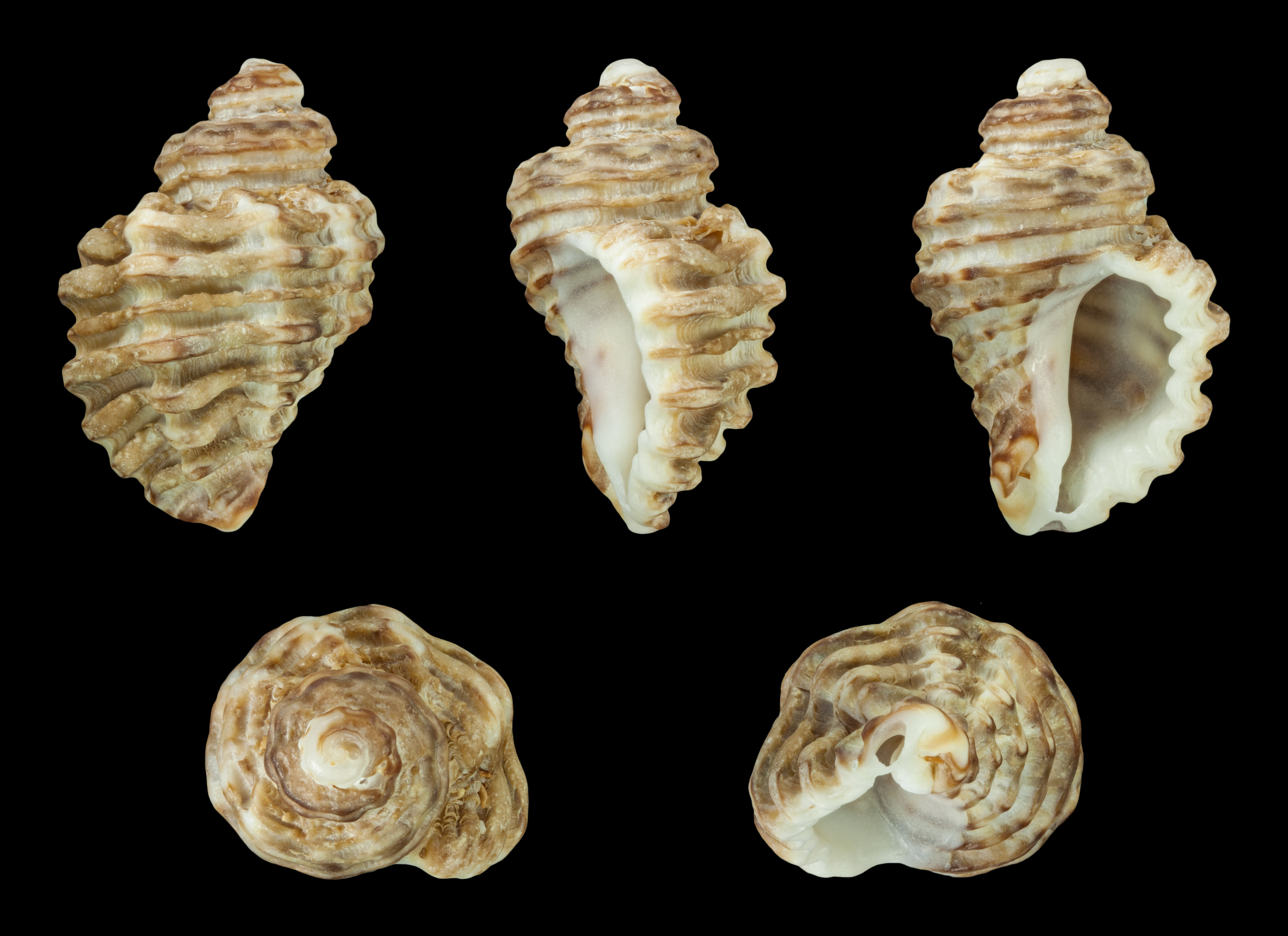
Ocenebra erinaceus torosa

== Synonyms ==
- Cenebra erinacea
- Murex bicristatus Risso, 1826
- Murex cinguliferus Lamarck, 1822
- Murex duthiersi Velain, 1877
- Murex erinaceus Linnaeus, 1758 (original combination)
  - Murex erinaceus var. amirrus de Gregorio, 1885
  - Murex erinaceus var. benisafiensis Koch in Pallary, 1900
  - Murex erinaceus var. conspersa Dautzenberg, 1887
  - Murex erinaceus var. depauperata Dautzenberg, 1887
  - Murex erinaceus var. fasciata Dautzenberg, 1887
  - Murex erinaceus var. fusca Dautzenberg, 1887
  - Murex erinaceus var. major Dautzenberg, 1920
  - Murex erinaceus var. mutica Dautzenberg & Durouchoux, 1913
  - Murex erinaceus var. sculpta Jeffreys, 1867
  - Murex erinaceus var. thersites Coen, 1933
  - Murex erinaceus var. triquetra Coen, 1933
  - Murex erinaceus var. venetiana de Gregorio in Coen, 1933
  - Murex erinaceus var. viriditincta Dautzenberg & Fischer, 1925
- Murex hanleyi Dautzenberg, 1887
- Murex imbricatus Chiereghini in Nardo, 1847
- Murex labiosus Chiereghini in Nardo, 1847
- Murex orbignyanus Risso, 1826
- Murex pirotectus de Gregorio, 1885
- Murex tarantinus Lamarck, 1822
- Murex triquetra Risso, 1826
- Murex ungulatus Chiereghini in Nardo, 1847
  - Ocenebra erinaceus elongatus Settepassi, 1970
  - Ocenebra erinaceus var. africanus Settepassi, 1970
  - Ocenebra erinaceus var. algerianus Settepassi, 1970
  - Ocenebra erinaceus var. candida Dautzenberg, 1894
  - Ocenebra erinaceus var. carneola Dautzenberg & Durouchoux, 1913
  - Ocenebra erinaceus var. dilatatus Settepassi, 1970
  - Ocenebra erinaceus var. foliosa Monterosato in Coen, 1914
  - Ocenebra erinaceus var. ibericus Settepassi, 1970
  - Ocenebra erinaceus var. neglectus Settepassi, 1970
  - Ocenebra erinaceus var. pagodulinus Settepassi, 1970
  - Ocenebra erinaceus var. producta Dautzenberg & Durouchoux, 1913
  - Ocenebra erinaceus var. solidus Settepassi, 1970
  - Ocenebra erinaceus var. squamulosus Philippi in Settepassi, 1970
  - Ocenebra gibbosus var. acuminatus Settepassi, 1970
  - Ocenebra gibbosus var. compositus Settepassi, 1970
  - Ocenebra gibbosus var. elongatus Settepassi, 1970
- Ocinebra labiosus (Chiereghini in Nardo, 1847)
  - Ocinebra labiosus var. fasciata Coen, 1933
- Purpura congener Roding, 1798
- Purpura senegalla Roding, 1798
- Tritonalia chicoroides Coen, 1947
- Tritonalia erinaceus (Linnaeus, 1758)
  - Tritonalia erinaceus var. clathrata Coen, 1947
- Tritonalia humilis Coen, 1947
- Tritonalia lampusiopsis Coen, 1947
- Tritonalia mercaensis Coen, 1947
- Tritonalia rejecta Monterosato in Coen, 1947
- Tritonalia rotunda Coen, 1947
- Tritonalia ruscuriana Monterosato in Coen, 1947
