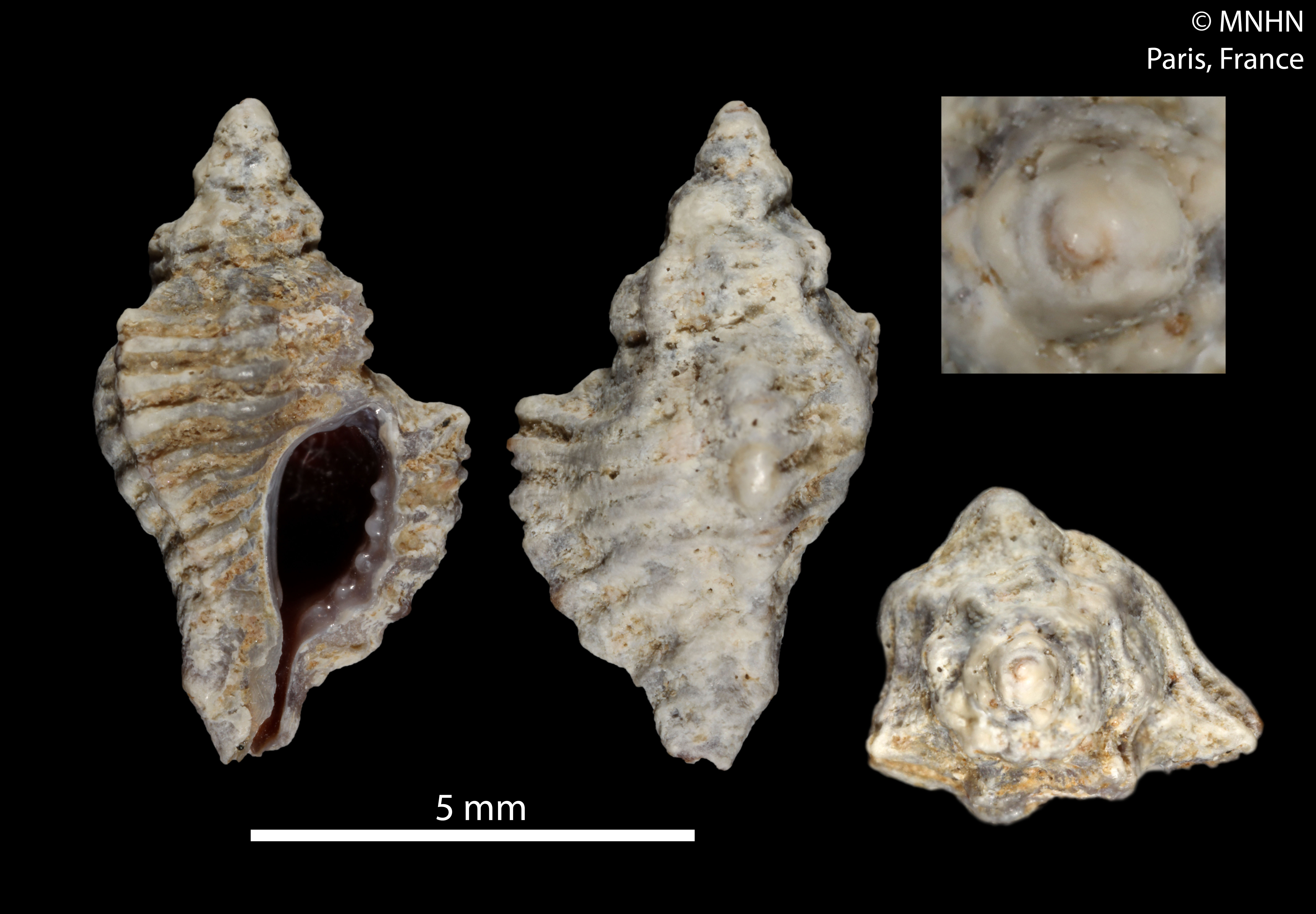
- Shell of Africanella isaacsi

Scientific classification
- Kingdom: Animalia
- Phylum: Mollusca
- Class: Gastropoda
- Subclass: Caenogastropoda
- Order: Neogastropoda
- Superfamily: Muricoidea
- Family: Muricidae
- Subfamily: Ocenebrinae
- Genus: Africanella; Vermeij & Houart, 1999

Type species
- Ocenebra isaacsi Houart, 1984

Species
- See text

= Africanella =

Genus of gastropods

Africanella is a genus of sea snails, marine gastropod mollusks in the family Muricidae, the murex snails or rock snails.

== Species ==
Species within the genus Africanella include:

- Africanella coseli (Houart, 1989)
- Africanella isaacsi (Houart, 1984)
