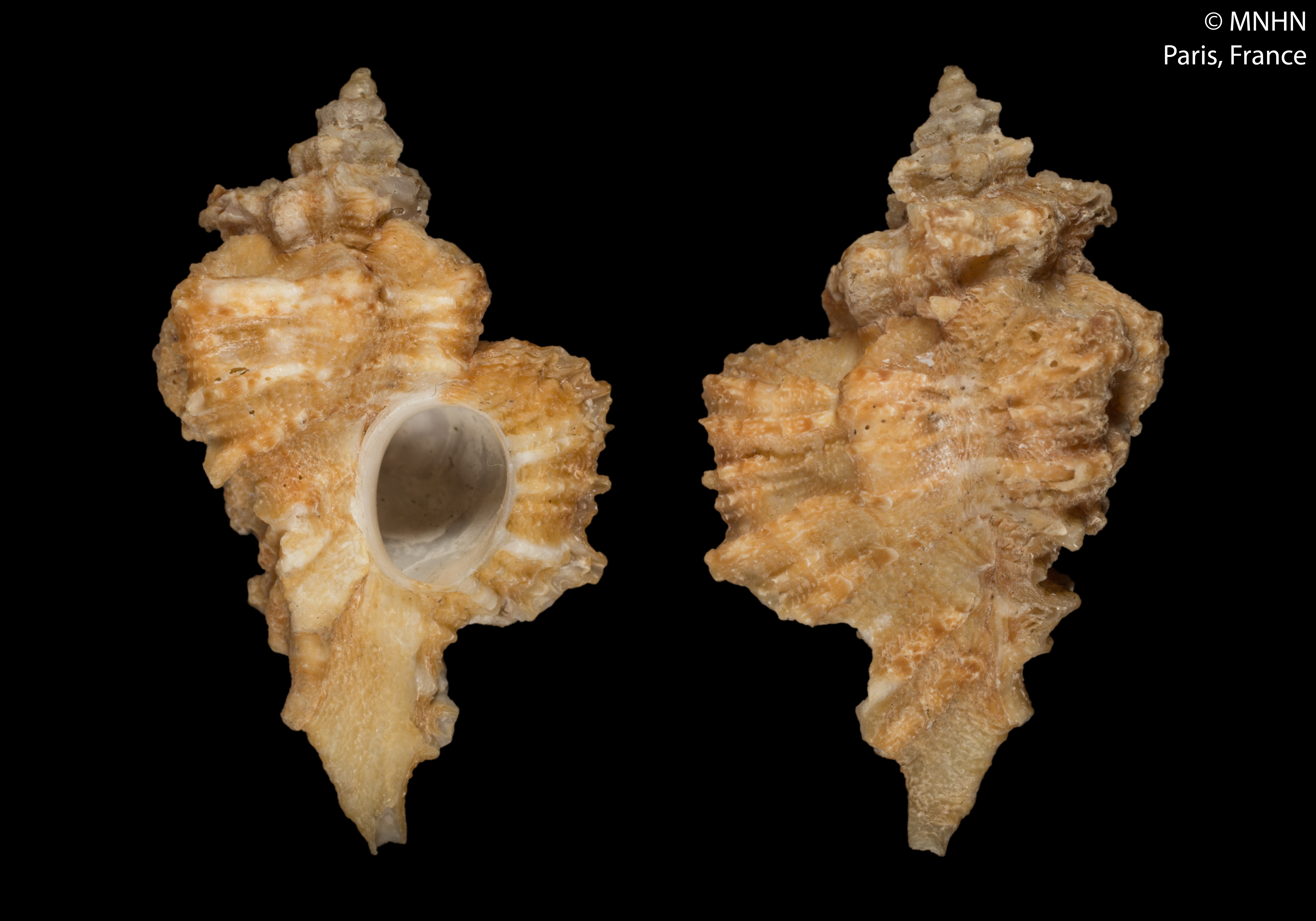

Scientific classification
- Kingdom: Animalia
- Phylum: Mollusca
- Class: Gastropoda
- Subclass: Caenogastropoda
- Order: Neogastropoda
- Family: Muricidae
- Genus: Jaton
- Species: J. flavidus

Binomial name
- Jaton flavidus (Jousseaume, 1874)

Synonyms
- Murex flavidus Jousseaume, 1874; Murex rusticus Jousseaume, 1874

= Jaton flavidus =

Species of gastropod

Jaton flavidus is a species of sea snail, a marine gastropod mollusk in the family Muricidae, the murex snails or rock snails.

== Distribution ==
This marine species occurs off Dakar, Senegal at a depth of ca 10–50 m.
