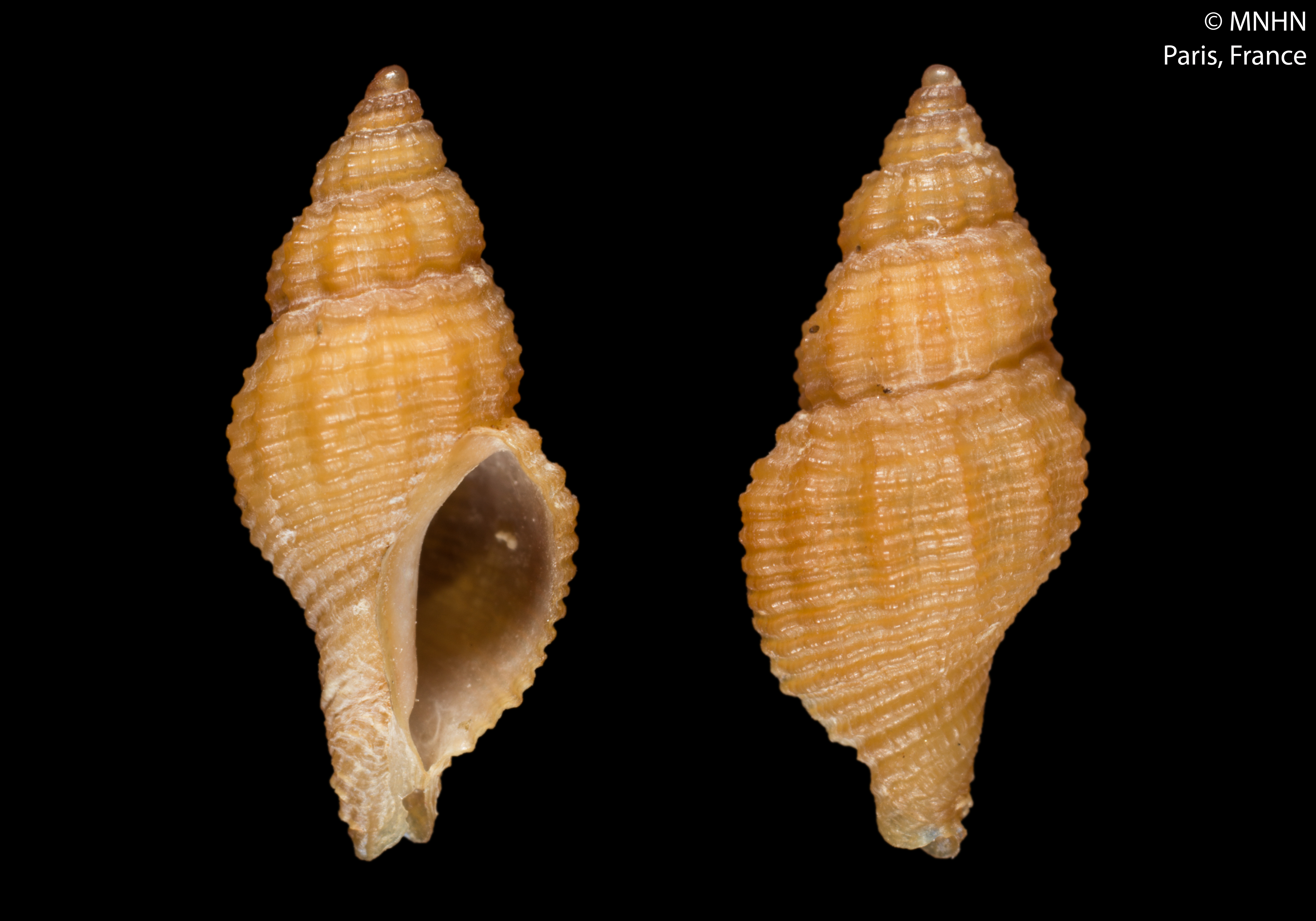
- Shell of Ocinebrina corallinoides (holotype at MNHN, Paris)

Scientific classification
- Kingdom: Animalia
- Phylum: Mollusca
- Class: Gastropoda
- Subclass: Caenogastropoda
- Order: Neogastropoda
- Family: Muricidae
- Subfamily: Ocenebrinae
- Genus: Ocinebrina
- Species: O. corallinoides

Binomial name
- Ocinebrina corallinoides Pallary, 1912

Synonyms
- Ocinebrina aciculata corallinoides Pallary, 1912; Ocinebrina aciculata exilis Houart, 2001; Ocinebrina buzzurroi Cecalupo & Mariani, 2008

= Ocinebrina corallinoides =

Species of gastropod

Ocinebrina corallinoides is a species of sea snail, a marine gastropod mollusk in the family Muricidae, the murex snails or rock snails.

== Description ==
The length of the shell attains 9.6 mm.

The variety Ocinebrina corallinus var. major Pallary, 1900 is a synonym of Ocinebrina aciculata aciculata (Lamarck, 1822): synonym of Ocinebrina aciculata (Lamarck, 1822)

== Distribution ==
This marine species occurs in the Gulf of Gabès, Tunisia
