= Ocinebrellus lumarius =

Scientific classification
- Kingdom: Animalia
- Phylum: Mollusca
- Class: Gastropoda
- Subclass: Caenogastropoda
- Order: Neogastropoda
- Family: Muricidae
- Genus: Ocinebrellus
- Species: O. lumarius

Binomial name
- Ocinebrellus lumarius (Yokoyama, 1926)

Synonyms
- Ocenebra lumaria Yokoyama, 1926 (original combination)

Species of gastropod

Ocinebrellus lumarius is a species of sea snail, a marine gastropod mollusc in the family Muricidae, the murex snails or rock snails.
