= Ocenebra paddeui =

Scientific classification
- Kingdom: Animalia
- Phylum: Mollusca
- Class: Gastropoda
- Subclass: Caenogastropoda
- Order: Neogastropoda
- Family: Muricidae
- Genus: Ocenebra
- Species: O. paddeui

Binomial name
- Ocenebra paddeui (Bonomolo & Buzzurro, 2006)

Synonyms
- Ocinebrina paddeui Bonomolo & Buzzurro, 2006

Species of gastropod

Ocenebra paddeui is a species of sea snail, a marine gastropod mollusk in the family Muricidae, the murex snails or rock snails.
