= Jaton decussatus =

Scientific classification
- Kingdom: Animalia
- Phylum: Mollusca
- Class: Gastropoda
- Subclass: Caenogastropoda
- Order: Neogastropoda
- Family: Muricidae
- Genus: Jaton
- Species: J. decussatus

Binomial name
- Jaton decussatus (Gmelin, 1791)

Synonyms
- Murex decussatus Gmelin, 1791; Murex gibbosus Lamarck, 1822; Murex jatonus Lamarck, 1816; Murex lingua Dillwyn, 1817; Murex linguavervecina Reeve, 1845; Ocenebra gibbosa (Lamarck, 1822); Purpura jatou Jousseaume, 1879

Species of gastropod

Jaton decussatus is a species of sea snail, a marine gastropod mollusk in the family Muricidae, the murex snails or rock snails.
