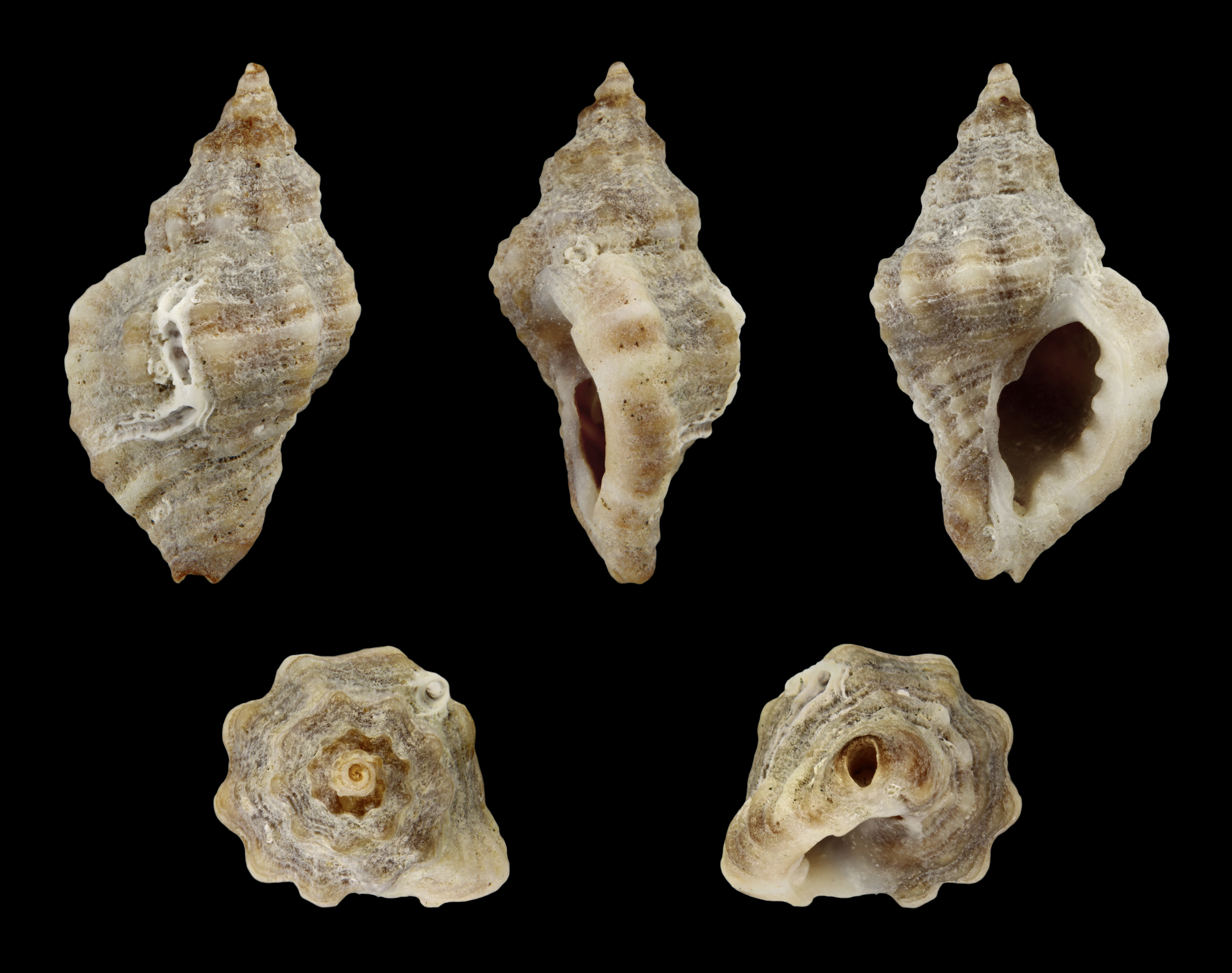

Scientific classification
- Kingdom: Animalia
- Phylum: Mollusca
- Class: Gastropoda
- Subclass: Caenogastropoda
- Order: Neogastropoda
- Family: Muricidae
- Genus: Ocenebra
- Species: O. edwardsii

Binomial name
- Ocenebra edwardsii (Payraudeau, 1826)

Synonyms
- List: Amyclina compacta F. Nordsieck, 1968; Fusus lusitanicus Allen, 1858; Fusus subaciculatus Brugnone, 1876; Murex baeticus Reeve, 1845; Murex edwardsi (Payraudeau, 1826) [lapsus]; Murex edwardsii (Payraudeau, 1826); Murex lassaignei Deshayes, 1835; Murex pumilus Kuster, 1869; Murex scopulorum Segre, 1954; Murex semiclausus Kuster, 1869; Muricopsis affinis Settepassi, 1977; Muricopsis apiculata Dautzenberg, 1917; Muricopsis edwardsii (Payraudeau, 1826); Ocenebra requieni Locard, 1899; Ocinebrina cyclopus Benoit in Monterosato, 1884; Ocinebrina edwardsi (Payraudeau, 1826) [lapsus]; Ocinebrina edwardsii (Payraudeau, 1826); Ocinebrina ruderata Settepassi, 1977; Ocinebrina scaloropsis Settepassi, 1977; Purpura edwardsii Payraudeau, 1826

= Ocenebra edwardsii =

Species of gastropod

Ocinebrina edwardsii is a species of sea snail, a marine gastropod mollusk in the family Muricidae, the murex snails or rock snails.

== Description ==
The shell size varies between 12 mm and 20 mm.

== Distribution ==
This species is distributed in European waters and in the Mediterranean Sea along Greece and Apulia, Italy; in the Atlantic Ocean along western Africa.
