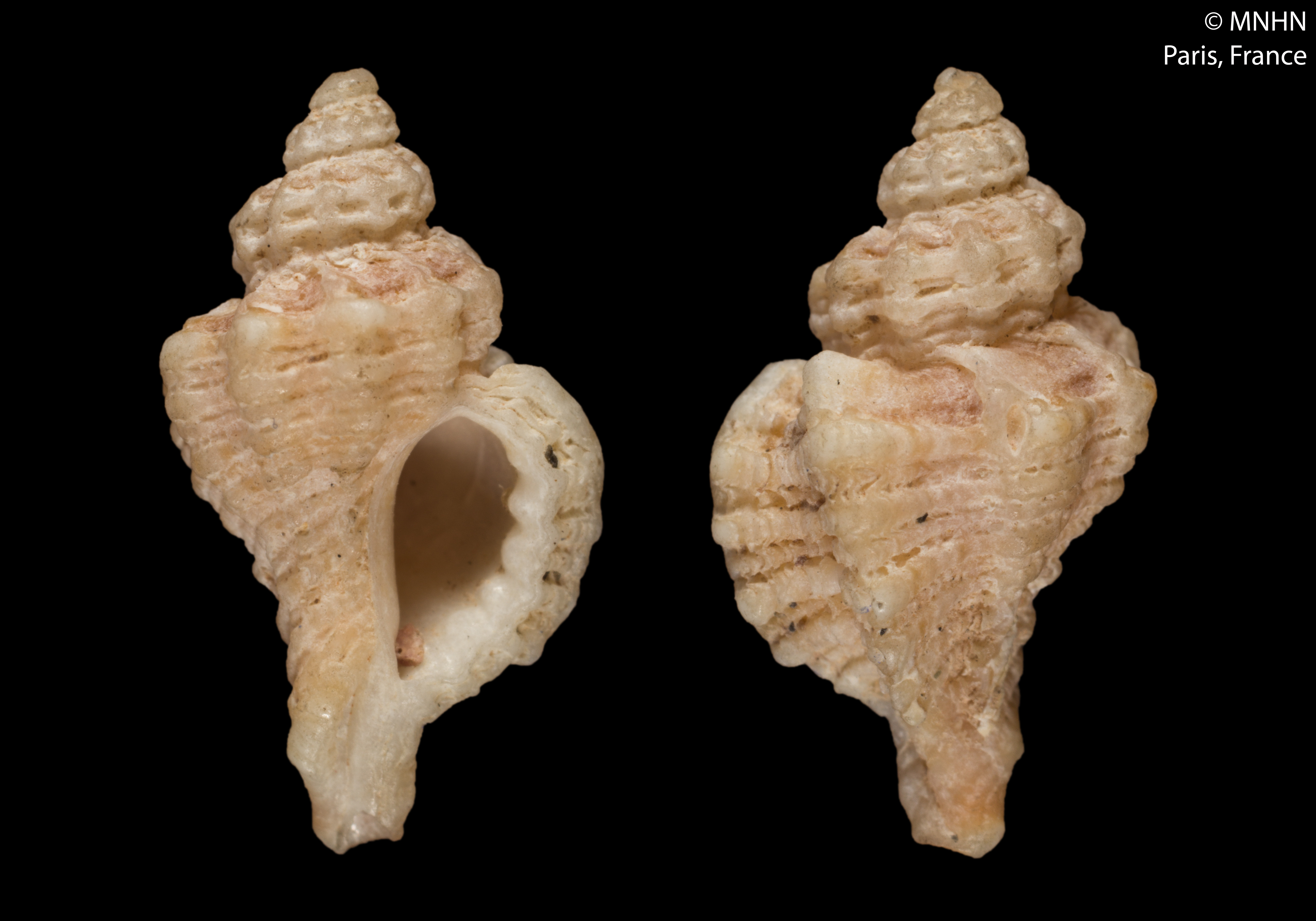
- Shell of Ocenebra miscowichae (syntype at MNHN, Paris)

Scientific classification
- Kingdom: Animalia
- Phylum: Mollusca
- Class: Gastropoda
- Subclass: Caenogastropoda
- Order: Neogastropoda
- Family: Muricidae
- Genus: Ocenebra
- Species: O. miscowichae

Binomial name
- Ocenebra miscowichae (Pallary, 1920)

Synonyms
- Ocinebrina miscowichi Pallary, 1920; Ocinebrina miscowichae Pallary, 1920

= Ocenebra miscowichae =

Species of gastropod

Ocenebra miscowichae is a species of sea snail, a marine gastropod mollusk in the family Muricidae, the murex snails or rock snails.

== Distribution ==
This marine species occurs off Morocco.
