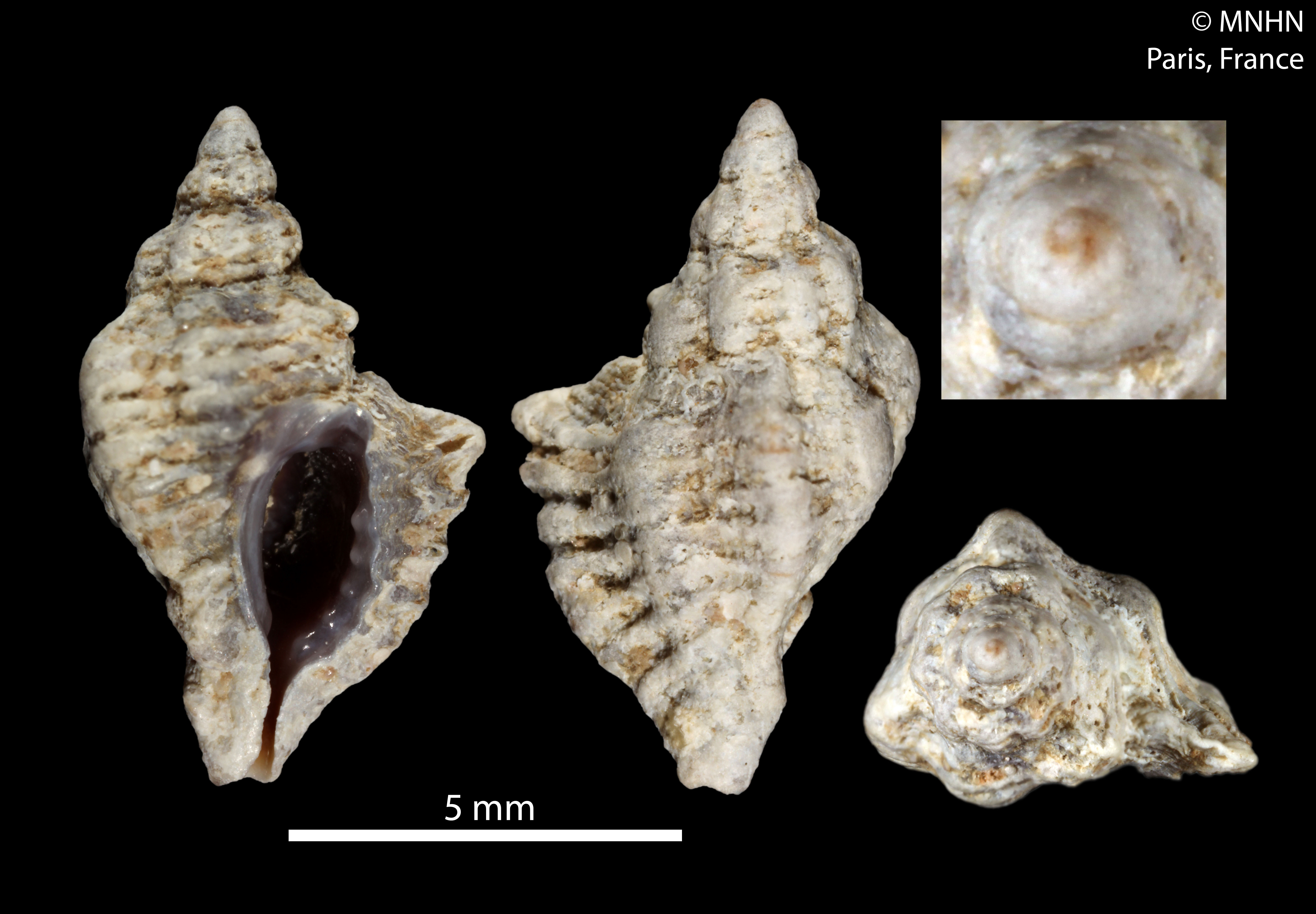
- Shell of Africanella isaacsi (paratype at MNHN, Paris)

Scientific classification
- Kingdom: Animalia
- Phylum: Mollusca
- Class: Gastropoda
- Subclass: Caenogastropoda
- Order: Neogastropoda
- Family: Muricidae
- Genus: Africanella
- Species: A. isaacsi

Binomial name
- Africanella isaacsi (Houart, 1984)

Synonyms
- Ocenebra isaacsi Houart, 1984

= Africanella isaacsi =

Species of gastropod

Africanella isaacsi is a species of sea snail, a marine gastropod mollusk in the family Muricidae, the murex snails or rock snails.
