= Ocenebra inordinata =

Scientific classification
- Kingdom: Animalia
- Phylum: Mollusca
- Class: Gastropoda
- Subclass: Caenogastropoda
- Order: Neogastropoda
- Family: Muricidae
- Genus: Ocenebra
- Species: O. inordinata

Binomial name
- Ocenebra inordinata Houart & Abreu, 1994

Synonyms
- Ocenebra (Ocinebrina) inordinata Houart & Abreu 1994; Ocinebrina inordinata (Houart & Abreu, 1994)

Species of gastropod

Ocenebra inordinata is a species of sea snail, a marine gastropod mollusk in the family Muricidae, the murex snails or rock snails.
