= Ocenebra ingloria =

Scientific classification
- Kingdom: Animalia
- Phylum: Mollusca
- Class: Gastropoda
- Subclass: Caenogastropoda
- Order: Neogastropoda
- Family: Muricidae
- Genus: Ocenebra
- Species: O. ingloria

Binomial name
- Ocenebra ingloria (Crosse, 1865)

Synonyms
- Murex inglorius Crosse, 1865; Ocinebrina ingloria (Crosse, 1865)

Species of gastropod

Ocenebra ingloria is a species of sea snail, a marine gastropod mollusk in the family Muricidae, the murex snails or rock snails.

== Description ==
The length of the shell attains 18 mm. it lives in the marine and found in Chioggia, Italy and often trawled by local fishermen. It stays -20/30m inside sea soil.
