= Ocenebra nicolai =

Scientific classification
- Kingdom: Animalia
- Phylum: Mollusca
- Class: Gastropoda
- Subclass: Caenogastropoda
- Order: Neogastropoda
- Family: Muricidae
- Genus: Ocenebra
- Species: O. nicolai

Binomial name
- Ocenebra nicolai (Monterosato, 1884)

Synonyms
- Ocinebrina nicolai Monterosato, 1884

Species of gastropod

Ocenebra nicolai is a species of sea snail, a marine gastropod mollusk in the family Muricidae, the murex snails or rock snails.
