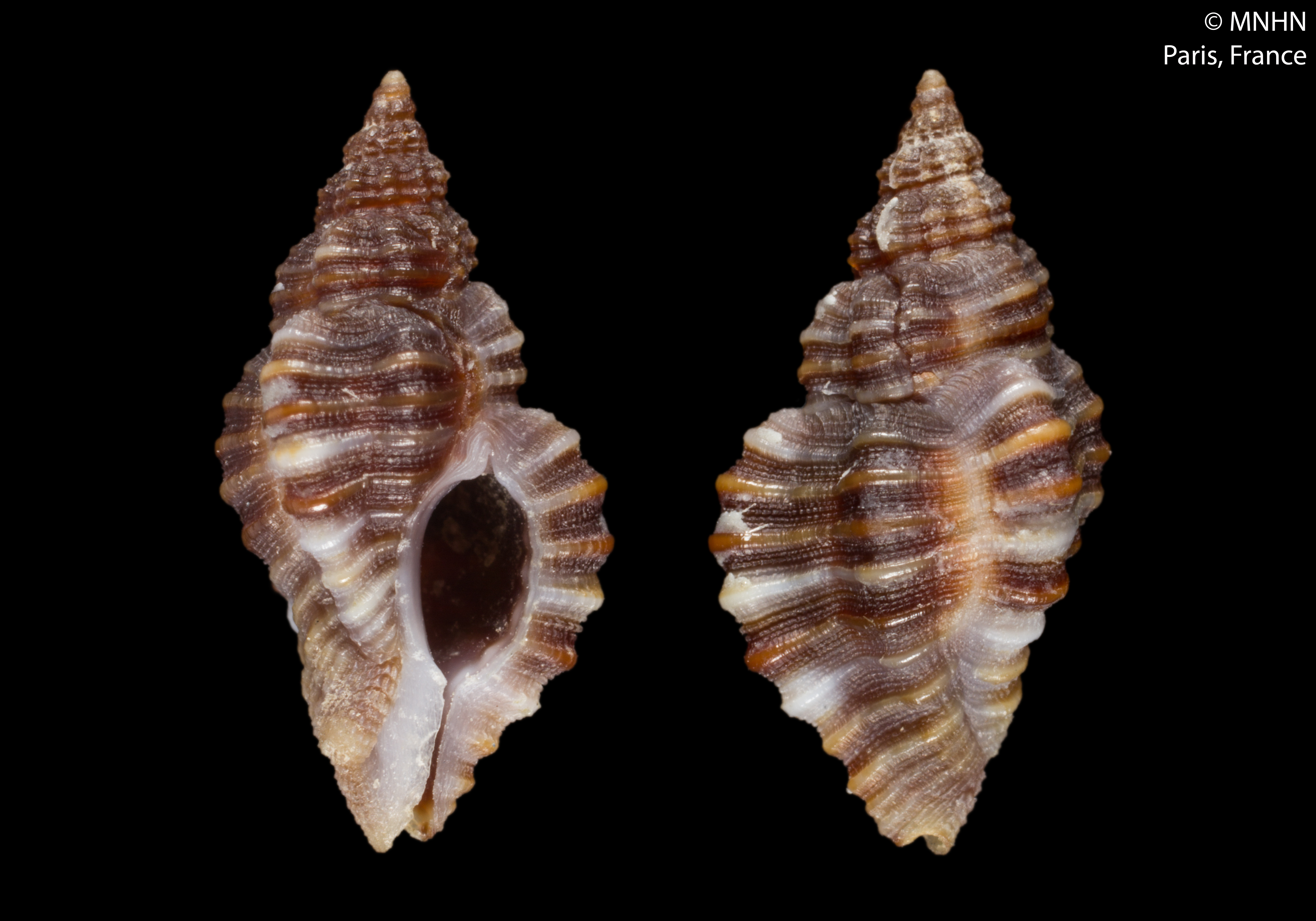
- Shell of Africanella coseli (holotype at MNHN, Paris)

Scientific classification
- Kingdom: Animalia
- Phylum: Mollusca
- Class: Gastropoda
- Subclass: Caenogastropoda
- Order: Neogastropoda
- Family: Muricidae
- Genus: Africanella
- Species: A. coseli

Binomial name
- Africanella coseli (Houart, 1989)

Synonyms
- Ocenebra coseli Houart, 1989

= Africanella coseli =

Species of gastropod

Africanella coseli is a species of sea snail, a marine gastropod mollusk in the family Muricidae, the murex snails or rock snails.
