= Urosalpinx subangulata =

Scientific classification
- Kingdom: Animalia
- Phylum: Mollusca
- Class: Gastropoda
- Subclass: Caenogastropoda
- Order: Neogastropoda
- Family: Muricidae
- Subfamily: Ocenebrinae
- Genus: Urosalpinx
- Species: U. subangulata

Binomial name
- Urosalpinx subangulata (Stearns, 1873)

Synonyms
- Muricidea subangulata Stearns, 1873; Ocenebra michaeli Ford, 1888; Ocenebra subangulata (Stearns, 1873); Ocenebra subangulata waldorfensis Arnold 1907; Pteropurpura waldorfensis Arnold 1907

Species of gastropod

Ocenebra subangulata is a species of sea snail, a marine gastropod mollusk in the family Muricidae, the murex snails or rock snails.

== Description ==
The length of the shell attains 13.7 mm.

(Original description) The small shell has an abbreviated fusiform shape. It is dingy white and marked spirally by an inconspicuous band formed of three reddish-brown lines more or less interrupted on the basal and the preceding whorl. The shell contains five whorls angulated above and on the body whorl, rounded below the angle, with a shallow sulcation beneath. The surface is covered with rounded and irregular ribs, which are inconspicuous or obsolete on the upper whorls. The shell is longitudinally marked with from seven to nine irregular rounded ribs, which at the edge of the angle (which is somewhat carinated). They are broken into angular or pointed knobs or blunt spines. The aperture is ovate, angulated above and white within. The outer lip has five or six tubercles internally. The siphonal canal is moderately prolonged, slightly curved and open in the two specimens before the author.

== Distribution ==
This marine species occurs off California.
