= Ocenebra piantonii =

Scientific classification
- Kingdom: Animalia
- Phylum: Mollusca
- Class: Gastropoda
- Subclass: Caenogastropoda
- Order: Neogastropoda
- Family: Muricidae
- Genus: Ocenebra
- Species: O. piantonii

Binomial name
- Ocenebra piantonii (Cecalupo, Buzzurro & Mariani, 2008)

Synonyms
- Ocinebrina carmelae Cecalupo, Buzzurro & Mariani, 2008; Ocinebrina piantonii Cecalupo, Buzzurro & Mariani, 2008

Species of gastropod

Ocenebra piantonii is a species of sea snail, a marine gastropod mollusk in the family Muricidae, the murex snails or rock snails.
