= Ocinebrellus acanthophorus =

Scientific classification
- Kingdom: Animalia
- Phylum: Mollusca
- Class: Gastropoda
- Subclass: Caenogastropoda
- Order: Neogastropoda
- Family: Muricidae
- Genus: Ocinebrellus
- Species: O. acanthophorus

Binomial name
- Ocinebrellus acanthophorus (A. Adams, 1863)

Synonyms
- Murex endermonensis Sowerby, 1879; Phyllonotus acanthophora A. Adams, 1863

Species of gastropod

Ocinebrellus acanthophorus is a species of sea snail, a marine gastropod mollusk in the family Muricidae, the murex snails or rock snails.
