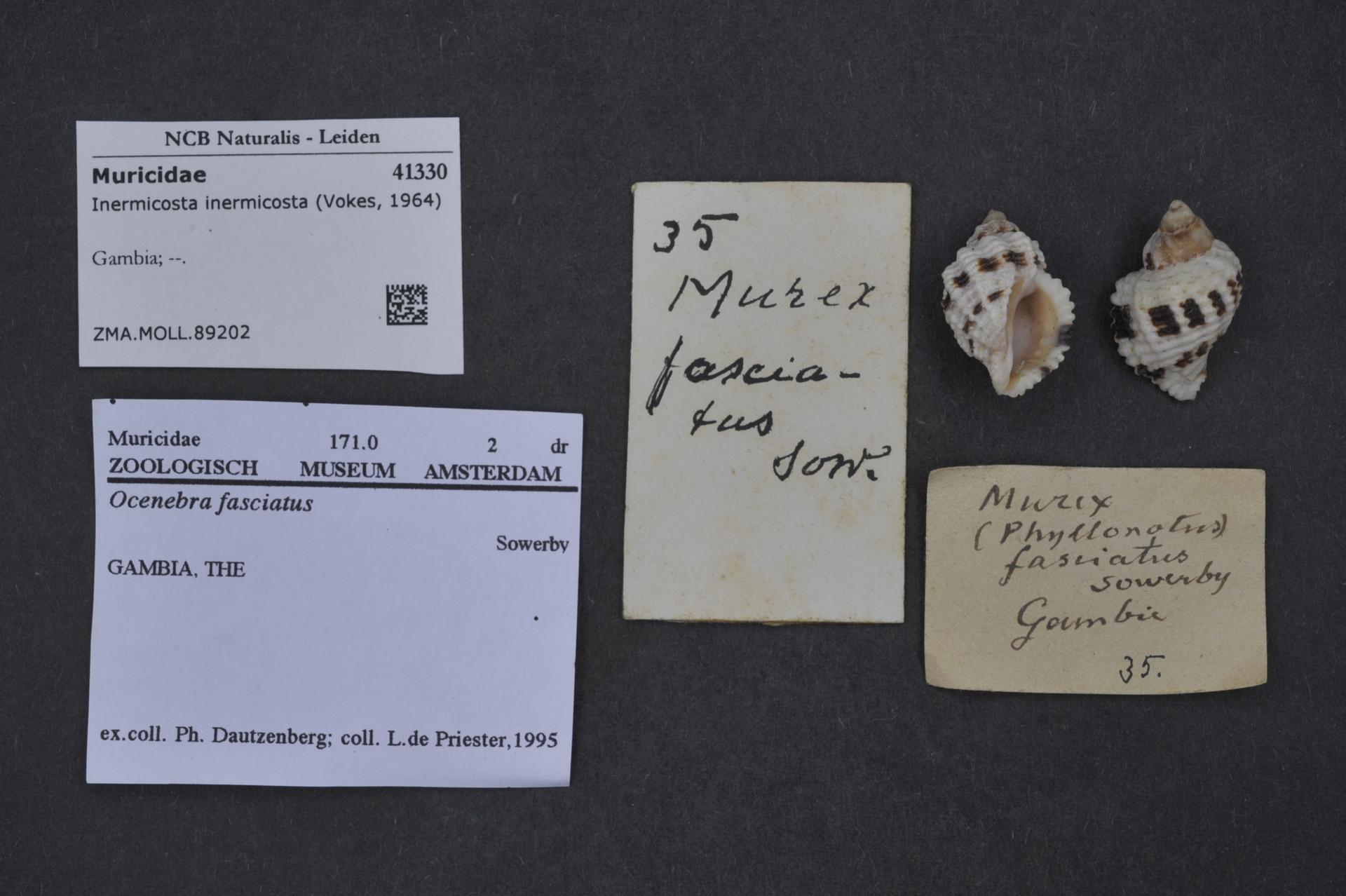
- Inermicosta inermicosta

Scientific classification
- Kingdom: Animalia
- Phylum: Mollusca
- Class: Gastropoda
- Subclass: Caenogastropoda
- Order: Neogastropoda
- Family: Muricidae
- Genus: Inermicosta
- Species: I. inermicosta

Binomial name
- Inermicosta inermicosta (Vokes, 1964)

Synonyms
- Murex fasciatus; Murex fasciatus sensu Risso Sowerby, 1841; Ocenebra inermicosta (Vokes, 1964); Tritonalia inermicosta Vokes, 1964

= Inermicosta inermicosta =

Species of gastropod

Inermicosta inermicosta is a species of sea snail, a marine gastropod mollusk in the family Muricidae, the murex snails or rock snails.

== Description ==
Shell size 20–25 mm.

== Distribution ==
This species is distributed in the Western Atlantic Ocean along Gabon and Angola.

Trawled on sandy mud bottom at 30–40 metres depth off Rivers State, Nigeria.
