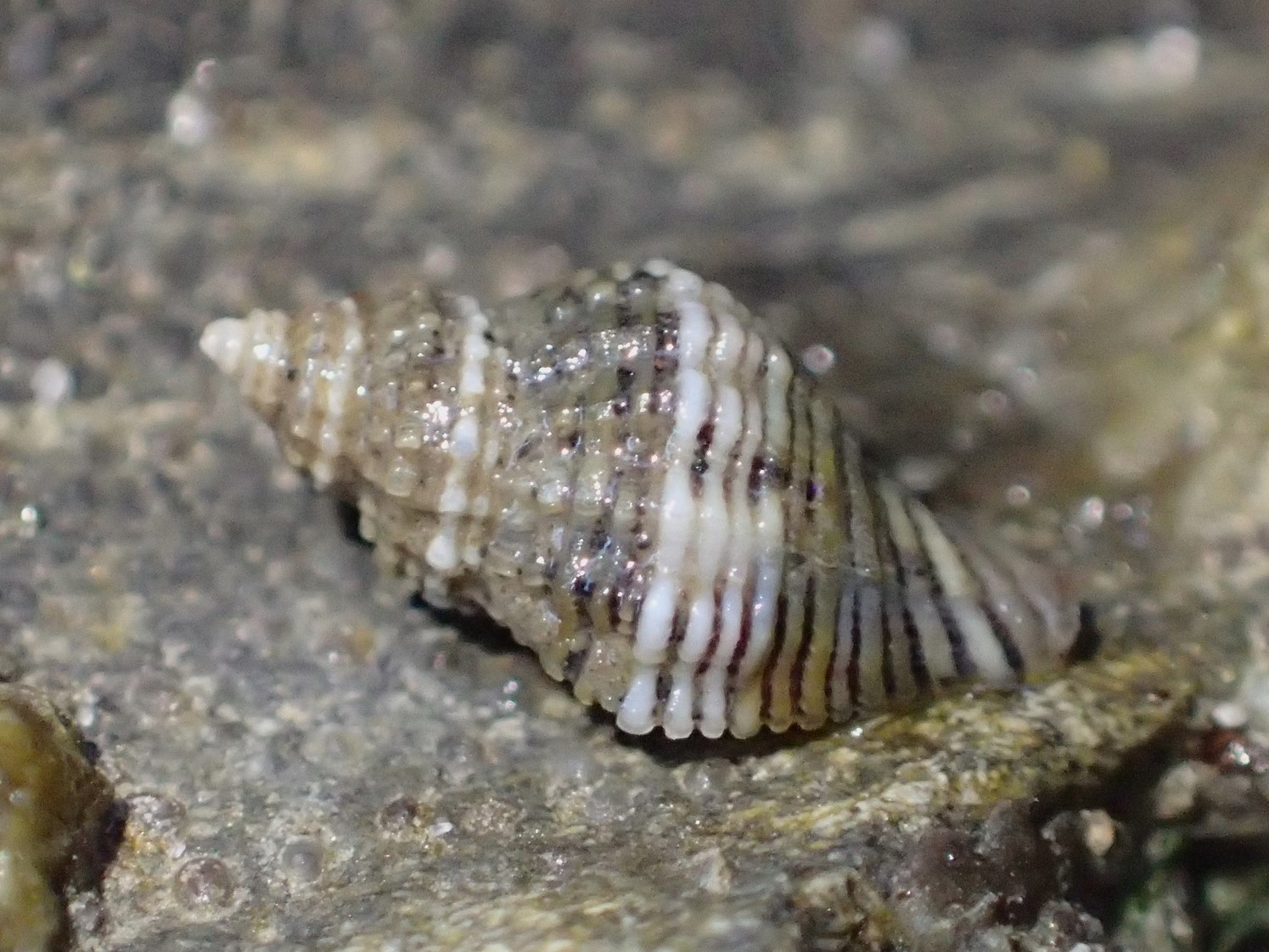

Scientific classification
- Kingdom: Animalia
- Phylum: Mollusca
- Class: Gastropoda
- Subclass: Caenogastropoda
- Order: Neogastropoda
- Family: Muricidae
- Genus: Paciocinebrina
- Species: P. gracillima

Binomial name
- Paciocinebrina gracillima (Stearns, 1871)

Synonyms
- Ocenebra gracillima Stearns, 1871; Ocenebra stearnsi Hemphill, 1911; Ocinebrina gracillima (Stearns, 1871); Tritonalia gracillima (Stearns, 1871)

= Paciocinebrina gracillima =

Graceful rocksnail

Species of gastropod

Paciocinebrina gracillima is a species of sea snail, a marine gastropod mollusk in the family Muricidae, the murex snails or rock snails.
