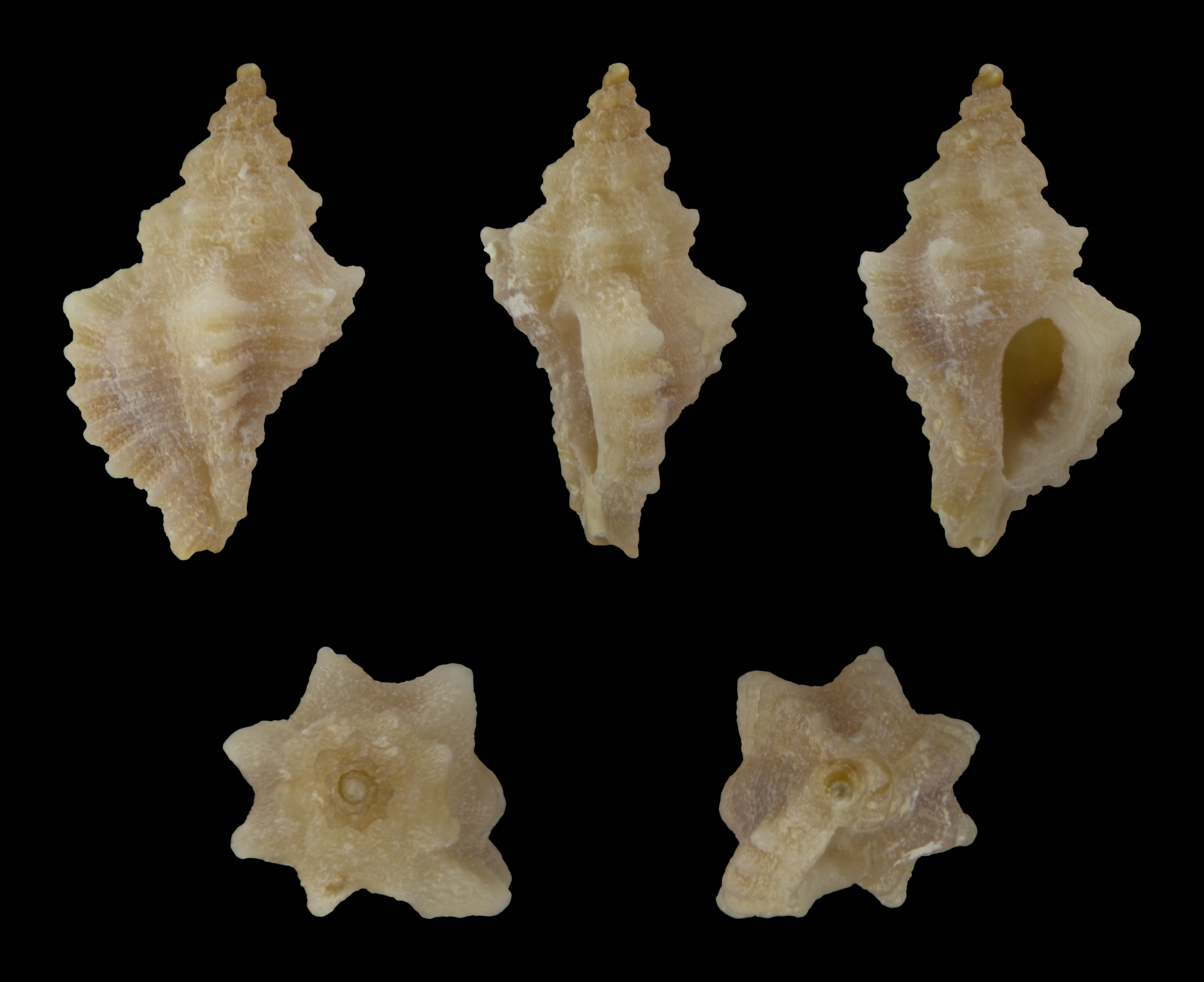

Scientific classification
- Kingdom: Animalia
- Phylum: Mollusca
- Class: Gastropoda
- Subclass: Caenogastropoda
- Order: Neogastropoda
- Family: Muricidae
- Genus: Ocenebra
- Species: O. hybrida

Binomial name
- Ocenebra hybrida (Aradas & Benoit, 1876)

Synonyms
- List: Murex hybridus Aradas & Benoit, 1876; Murex pereger Brugnone, 1873; Muricopsis edwardsii var. inflatus Settepassi, 1977; Muricopsis hispidula fasciata Settepassi, 1977; Muricopsis hispidulus inflatus Settepassi, 1977; Muricopsis tenellus Monterosato in Settepassi, 1977; Ocinebrina edwardsi var. fasciatus Settepassi, 1977; Ocinebrina hybrida (Aradas & Benoit, 1876)

= Ocenebra hybrida =

Species of gastropod

Ocenebra hybrida is a species of sea snail, a marine gastropod mollusk in the family Muricidae, the murex snails or rock snails.
