= Ocenebra purpuroidea =

Scientific classification
- Kingdom: Animalia
- Phylum: Mollusca
- Class: Gastropoda
- Subclass: Caenogastropoda
- Order: Neogastropoda
- Family: Muricidae
- Genus: Ocenebra
- Species: O. purpuroidea

Binomial name
- Ocenebra purpuroidea (Pallary, 1920)

Synonyms
- Ocinebrina purpuroidea Pallary, 1920 (original combination); Ocinebrina purpuroidea var. minor Pallary, 1920

Species of gastropod

Ocenebra purpuroidea is a species of sea snail, a marine gastropod mollusk in the family Muricidae, the murex snails or rock snails.

== Distribution ==
This marine species occurs off Morocco.
