= Ocinebrellus inornatus =

Scientific classification
- Kingdom: Animalia
- Phylum: Mollusca
- Class: Gastropoda
- Subclass: Caenogastropoda
- Order: Neogastropoda
- Family: Muricidae
- Genus: Ocinebrellus
- Species: O. inornatus

Binomial name
- Ocinebrellus inornatus (Récluz, 1851)

Synonyms
- Murex crassus A. Adams, 1853; Murex endermonis E. A. Smith, 1875; Murex inornatus Récluz, 1851; Murex japonicus Dunker, 1860; Murex talienwhanensis Crosse, 1862; Ocinebrellus inornatus (Récluz, 1851) (recombination); Pteropurpura (Ocinebrellus) inornata (Récluz, 1851) (recombination); Tritonium (Fusus) submuricatum Schrenck, 1862; Trophon incompta Gould, 1860

Species of gastropod

Preserved Ocinebrellus inornatus specimen.

Ocinebrellus inornatus, commonly called the Japanese oyster drill, Asian oyster drill, Asian drill, and Japanese oyster borer, is a species of small predatory sea snail, a marine gastropod mollusk in the family Muricidae, the murex snails or rock snails.

This species is native to Asia (Japan and Korea), but it has become a notorious introduced pest species in oyster beds in the western USA and Europe.
