= Ocenebra leukos =

Scientific classification
- Kingdom: Animalia
- Phylum: Mollusca
- Class: Gastropoda
- Subclass: Caenogastropoda
- Order: Neogastropoda
- Family: Muricidae
- Subfamily: Ocenebrinae
- Genus: Ocenebra
- Species: O. leukos

Binomial name
- Ocenebra leukos (Houart, 2000)

Synonyms
- Ocinebrina leukos Houart, 2000

Species of gastropod

Ocenebra leukos is a species of sea snail, a marine gastropod mollusk in the family Muricidae, the murex snails or rock snails.

== Description ==
Shell size 16 mm.

== Distribution ==
This operculated marine species occurs off the Canary Islands.
