= Coralliophila orcuttiana =

Scientific classification
- Kingdom: Animalia
- Phylum: Mollusca
- Class: Gastropoda
- Subclass: Caenogastropoda
- Order: Neogastropoda
- Superfamily: Muricoidea
- Family: Muricidae
- Subfamily: Coralliophilinae
- Genus: Coralliophila
- Species: C. orcuttiana

Binomial name
- Coralliophila orcuttiana Dall, 1919

Synonyms
- Ocenebra sloati Hertlein, 1958; Ocenebra sloati hambachi Hertlein, 1958

Species of gastropod

Coralliophila orcuttiana is a species of sea snail, a marine gastropod mollusk, in the family Muricidae, the murex snails or rock snails.
