= Pteropurpura fairiana =

Scientific classification
- Kingdom: Animalia
- Phylum: Mollusca
- Class: Gastropoda
- Subclass: Caenogastropoda
- Order: Neogastropoda
- Family: Muricidae
- Genus: Pteropurpura
- Species: P. fairiana

Binomial name
- Pteropurpura fairiana (Houart, 1979)

Synonyms
- Ocenebra fairiana Houart, 1979

Species of gastropod

Pteropurpura fairiana is a species of sea snail, a marine gastropod mollusk in the family Muricidae, the murex snails or rock snails.
