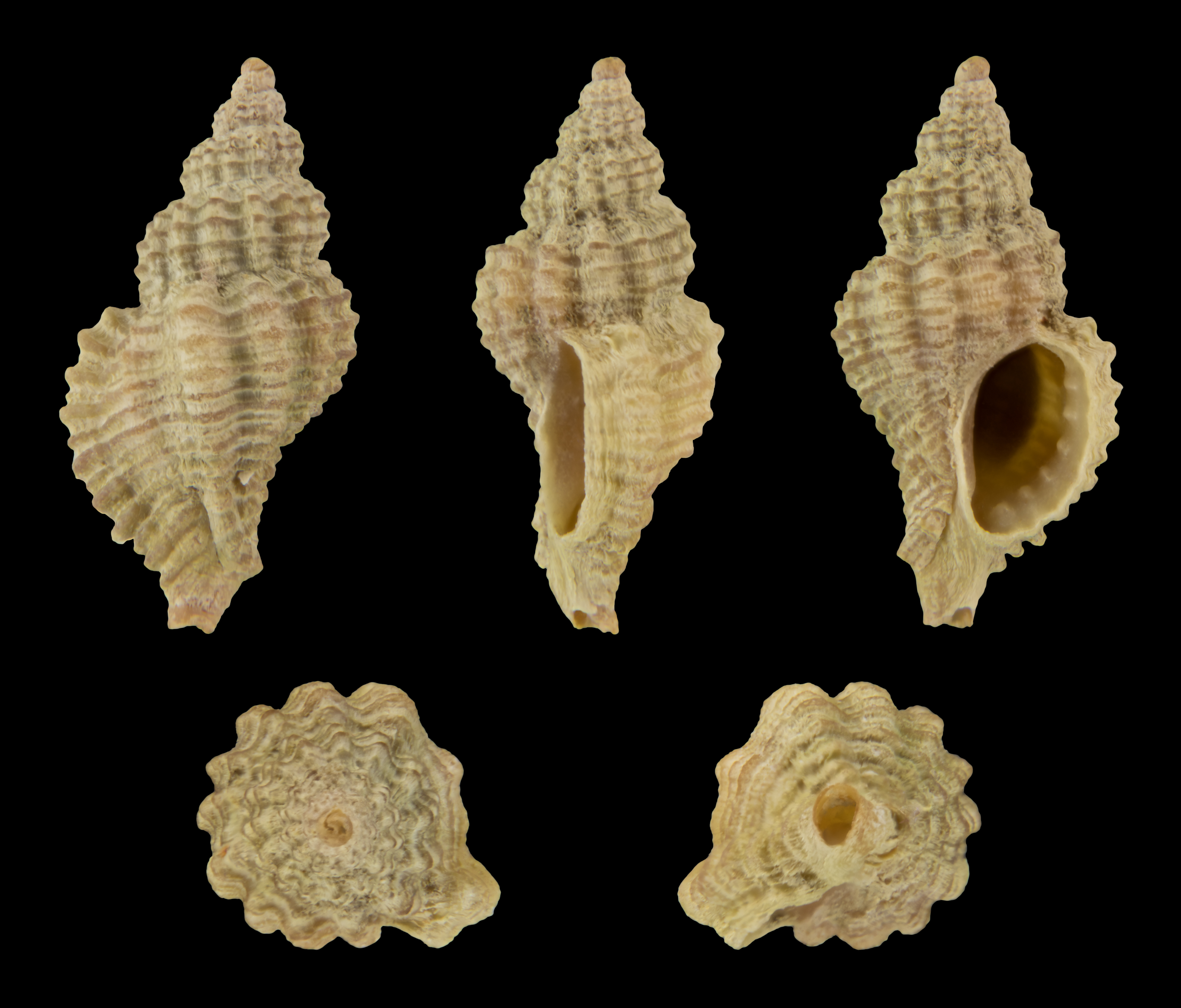

Scientific classification
- Kingdom: Animalia
- Phylum: Mollusca
- Class: Gastropoda
- Subclass: Caenogastropoda
- Order: Neogastropoda
- Family: Muricidae
- Genus: Ocenebra
- Species: O. helleri

Binomial name
- Ocenebra helleri (Brusina, 1865)

Synonyms
- Fusus helleri Brusina, 1865; Fusus hellerianus Brusina, 1866; Murex hellerianus Brusina, 1866; Murex weinkauffianus Crosse, 1866; Ocinebrina helleri (Brusina, 1865); Ocinebrina perfecta Monterosato in Settepassi, 1977

= Ocenebra helleri =

Species of gastropod

Ocenebra helleri is a species of sea snail, a marine gastropod mollusk in the family Muricidae, the murex snails or rock snails.
