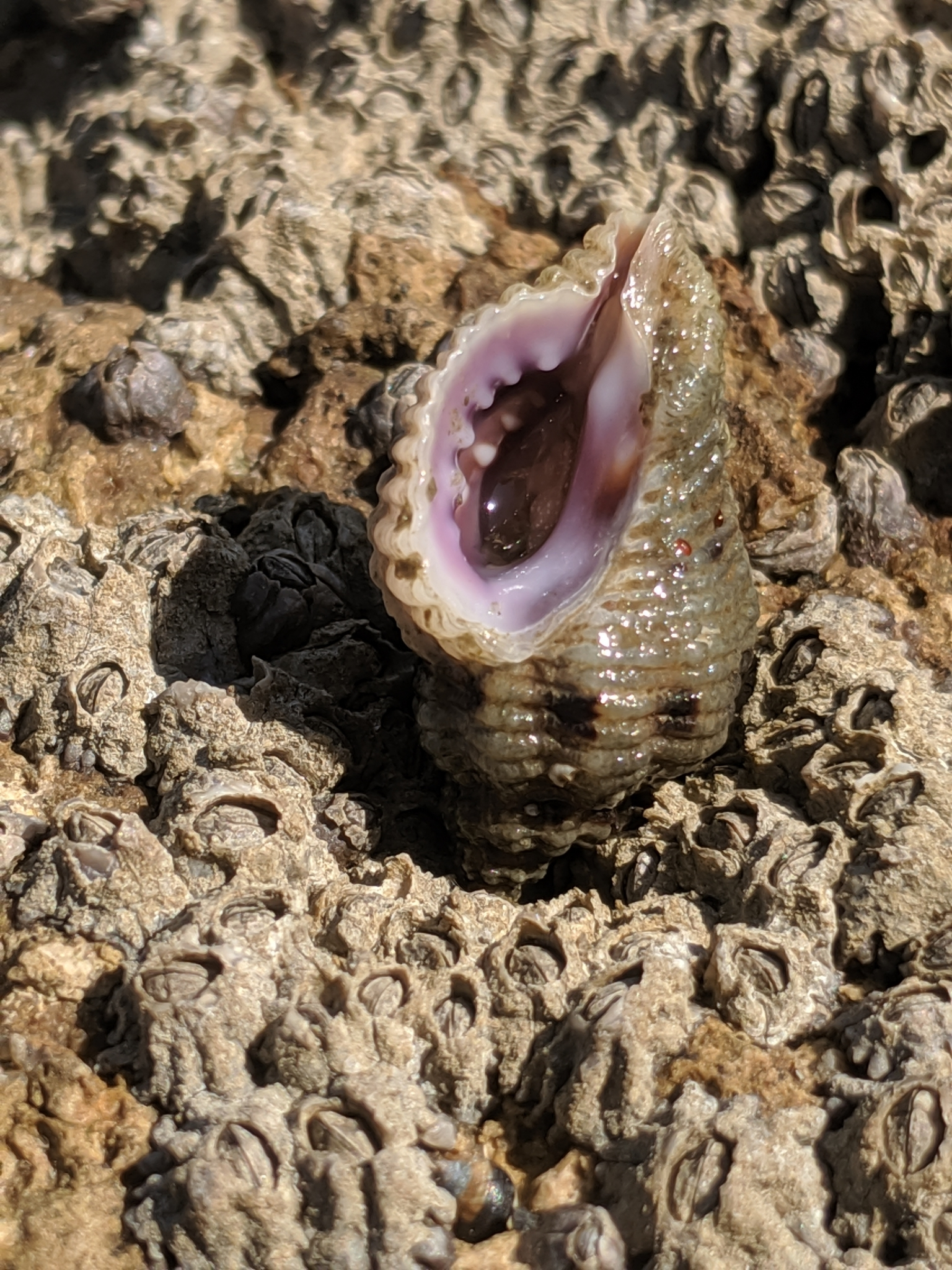

Scientific classification
- Kingdom: Animalia
- Phylum: Mollusca
- Class: Gastropoda
- Subclass: Caenogastropoda
- Order: Neogastropoda
- Family: Muricidae
- Genus: Paciocinebrina
- Species: P. circumtexta

Binomial name
- Paciocinebrina circumtexta (Stearns, 1871)

Synonyms
- Ocinebra circumtexta Stearns, 1871; Ocenebra circumtexta (Stearns, 1871); Tritonalia circumtexta (Stearns, 1871); Tritonalia citrica Dall, 1919; Tritonalia lurida var. rotunda Dall, 1919; Urosalpinx circumtexta (Stearns, 1871)

= Paciocinebrina circumtexta =

Species of gastropod

Paciocinebrina circumtexta is a species of sea snail, a marine gastropod mollusk in the family Muricidae, the murex snails or rock snails.
