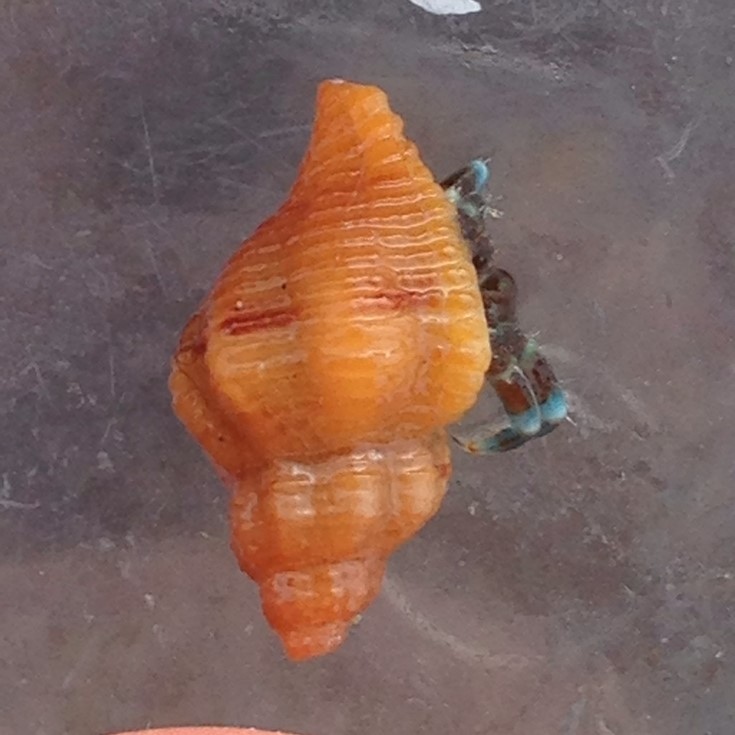

Scientific classification
- Kingdom: Animalia
- Phylum: Mollusca
- Class: Gastropoda
- Subclass: Caenogastropoda
- Order: Neogastropoda
- Family: Muricidae
- Genus: Paciocinebrina
- Species: P. foveolata

Binomial name
- Paciocinebrina foveolata (Hinds, 1844)

Synonyms
- Murex foveolatus Hinds, 1844; Ocenebra foveolata (Hinds, 1844); Ocinebrina epiphanea (Dall, 1919); Ocinebrina foveolata (Hinds, 1844); Tritonalia epiphanea Dall, 1919; Tritonalia fusconotata Dall, 1919

= Paciocinebrina foveolata =

Species of gastropod

Paciocinebrina foveolata is a species of sea snail, a marine gastropod mollusk in the family Muricidae, the murex snails or rock snails.
