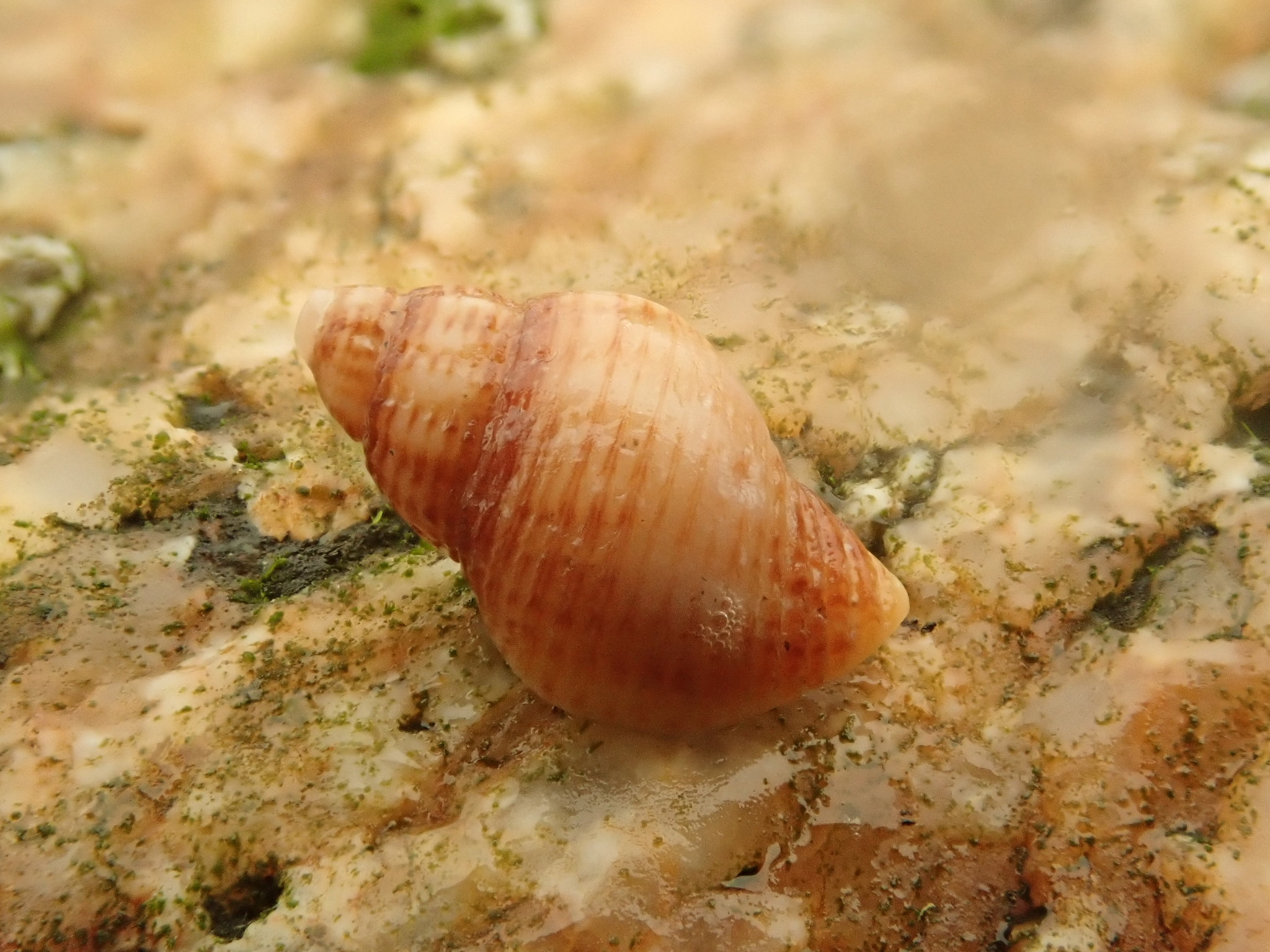

Scientific classification
- Kingdom: Animalia
- Phylum: Mollusca
- Class: Gastropoda
- Subclass: Caenogastropoda
- Order: Neogastropoda
- Family: Muricidae
- Genus: Paciocinebrina
- Species: P. lurida

Binomial name
- Paciocinebrina lurida (Middendorff, 1848)

Synonyms
- Ocenebra lurida (Middendorff, 1848); Ocinebra lurida Middendorff, 1848; Ocinebrina lurida Middendorff, 1848; Tritonalia lurida Middendorff, 1848; Tritonalia rotunda Dall, 1919; Tritonium luridum Middendorff, 1848; Vitularia aspera Baird, 1863

= Paciocinebrina lurida =

Species of gastropod

Paciocinebrina lurida is a species of sea snail, a marine gastropod mollusk in the family Muricidae, the murex snails or rock snails.

Common names for this species are dwarf lurid triton, lurid dwarf triton, lurid rocksnail, and dwarf triton. The species grows to 4cm long and lives in the intertidal to depths of 200 metres from central Alaska to northern Mexico. This marine gastropod favours strong-currents.
