= Paciocinebrina squamulifera =

Scientific classification
- Kingdom: Animalia
- Phylum: Mollusca
- Class: Gastropoda
- Subclass: Caenogastropoda
- Order: Neogastropoda
- Family: Muricidae
- Genus: Paciocinebrina
- Species: †P. squamulifera

Binomial name
- †Paciocinebrina squamulifera (Carpenter, 1869)

Synonyms
- †Ocenebra keepi Arnold, 1903; †Ocinebrina squamulifera (Carpenter, 1869); †Trophon squamulifera Carpenter, 1869

Species of gastropod

Paciocinebrina squamulifera is an extinct species of sea snail, a marine gastropod mollusk in the family Muricidae, the murex snails or rock snails.
