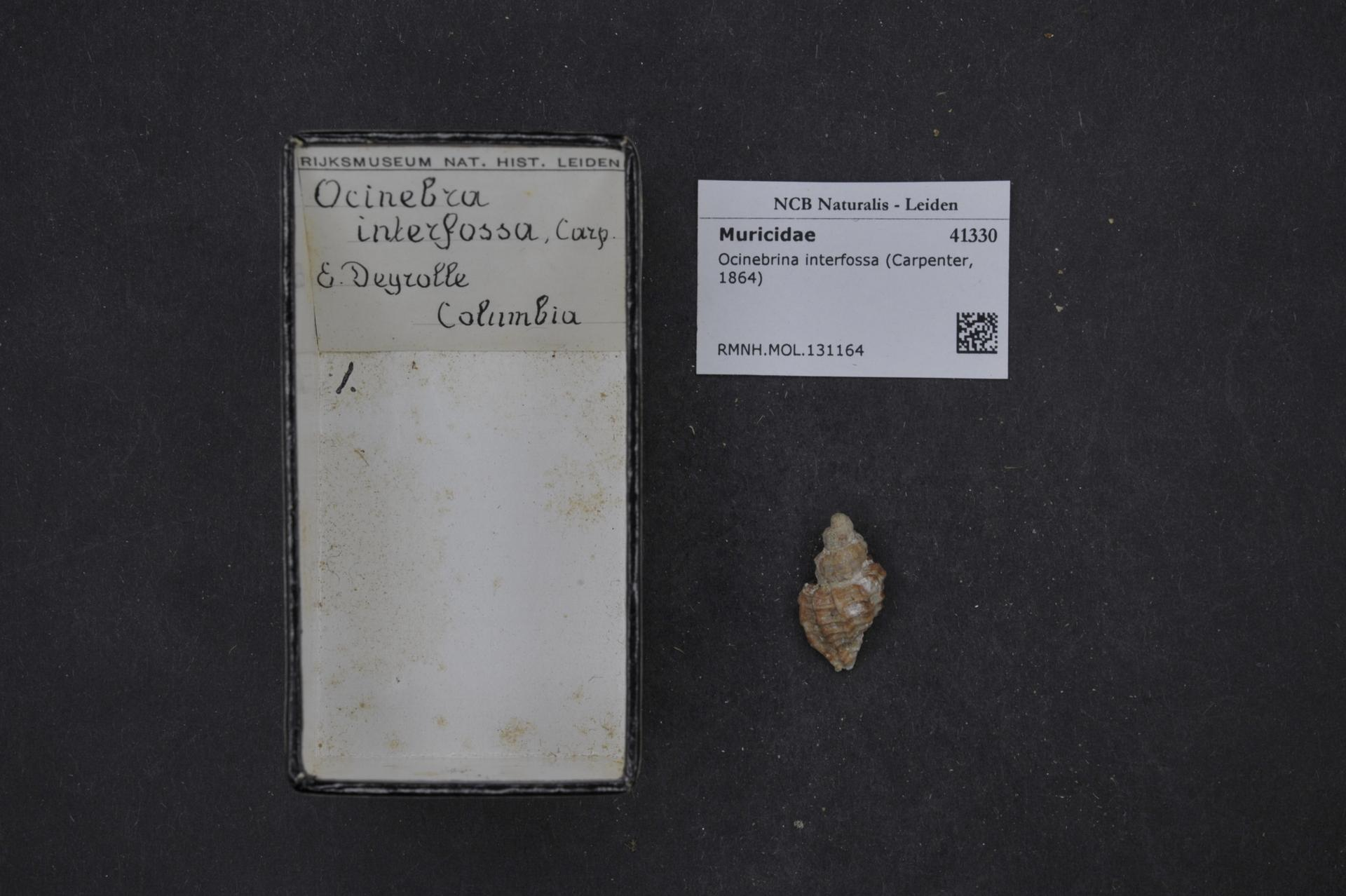

Scientific classification
- Kingdom: Animalia
- Phylum: Mollusca
- Class: Gastropoda
- Subclass: Caenogastropoda
- Order: Neogastropoda
- Family: Muricidae
- Genus: Paciocinebrina
- Species: P. interfossa

Binomial name
- Paciocinebrina interfossa (Carpenter, 1864)

Synonyms
- Ocenebra interfossa Carpenter, 1864; Ocinebrina interfossa (Carpenter, 1864); Tritonalia clathrata Dall, 1919; Tritonalia interfossa (Carpenter, 1864)

= Paciocinebrina interfossa =

Sculptured Rocksnail

Species of gastropod

Paciocinebrina interfossa is a species of sea snail, a marine gastropod mollusk in the family Muricidae, the murex snails or rock snails.
