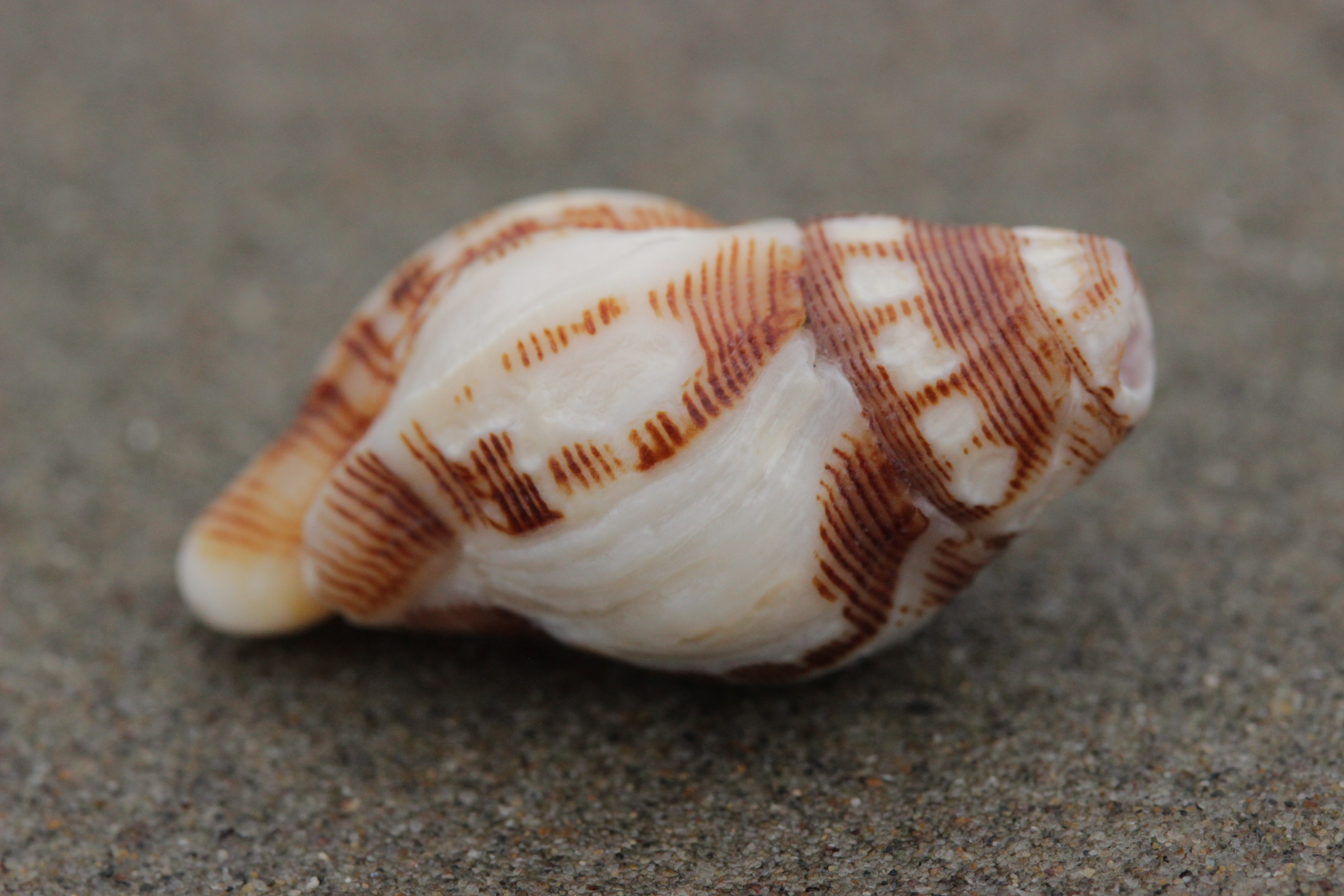

Scientific classification
- Kingdom: Animalia
- Phylum: Mollusca
- Class: Gastropoda
- Subclass: Caenogastropoda
- Order: Neogastropoda
- Family: Muricidae
- Genus: Roperia
- Species: R. poulsoni

Binomial name
- Roperia poulsoni (Carpenter, 1864)

Synonyms
- Fusus roperi Dall, 1898; Ocenebra poulsoni Carpenter, 1864

= Roperia poulsoni =

Species of gastropod

Roperia poulsoni is a species of sea snail, a marine gastropod mollusk in the family Muricidae, the murex snails or rock snails.

Roperia poulsoni is the only species in the genus Roperia.

Ocenebra poulsoni is the basionym, but this species has been placed in a separate genus because of its distinctive radula.
