= Paciocinebrina seftoni =

Scientific classification
- Kingdom: Animalia
- Phylum: Mollusca
- Class: Gastropoda
- Subclass: Caenogastropoda
- Order: Neogastropoda
- Family: Muricidae
- Genus: Paciocinebrina
- Species: P. seftoni

Binomial name
- Paciocinebrina seftoni (Chace, 1958)

Synonyms
- Ocenebra seftoni Chace, 1958; Ocinebrina seftoni (Chace, 1958)

Species of gastropod

Paciocinebrina seftoni is a species of sea snail, a marine gastropod mollusk in the family Muricidae, the murex snails or rock snails.
