= Ecphora =

Ecphora Temporal range: Eocene–Piacenzian
- Ecphora quadricostata, formation unknown

Scientific classification
- Kingdom: Animalia
- Phylum: Mollusca
- Class: Gastropoda
- Subclass: Caenogastropoda
- Order: Neogastropoda
- Family: Muricidae
- Subfamily: Ocenebrinae

Genera
- See text

Extinct group of gastropods

Ecphora is the common name for a group of extinct predatory marine gastropod molluscs within the family Muricidae, the rocks snails or murexes. The common name is based on the first officially described genus, Ecphora. The entire lineage of these ocenebrinin murexes are descended from the Eocene murex, Tritonopsis. Ecphoras were indigenous to the North American Eastern Seaboard, being found in marine strata from the Late Eocene until their extinction during the Pliocene. Many ecphora species are important index fossils.

== Etymology ==
The name "Ecphora" is Greek, meaning "bearing out." The word was originally used by Vitruvius to signify the projecture of a member or moulding of a column, and here refers to the distinctive "T-shaped" ribs that project from the shell.

== Subdivisions ==
There are at least 70 recognized species in nine genera of ecphoras recognized.

- Rapanecphora from Priaboian stage (Eocene) until the early Miocene
- Chesathais from Oligocene to Aquitanian stage (Miocene)
- Ecphorosycon from Oligocene to Aquitanian stage (Miocene)
- Siphoecphora early Miocene
- Trisecphora Miocene
- Ecphora Conrad, 1843 Miocene to Pliocene
    - E. gardnerae (the type species)
- Globecphora Miocene
- Latecphora Miocene to Pliocene
- Planecphora Miocene to Pliocene

== Evolution ==
In his book, The Field Guide to Ecphoras, Edward Petuch proposed that the ecphoras comprised the subfamily "Ecphorinae," a sister-group of the Rapaninae that were descended from various Maastrichtian Texan species of the Mesozoic murex genus Saragana. However, later research lead Petuch to revise ecphora evolution: now, the ecphoras are thought to be ocenibrenine murexes descended from the Eocene genus Tritonopsis, which is a common fossil in marine Eocene strata of the Southeastern United States. The closest living relatives of the ecphoras is the extant ocenibrine murex genus Forreria.

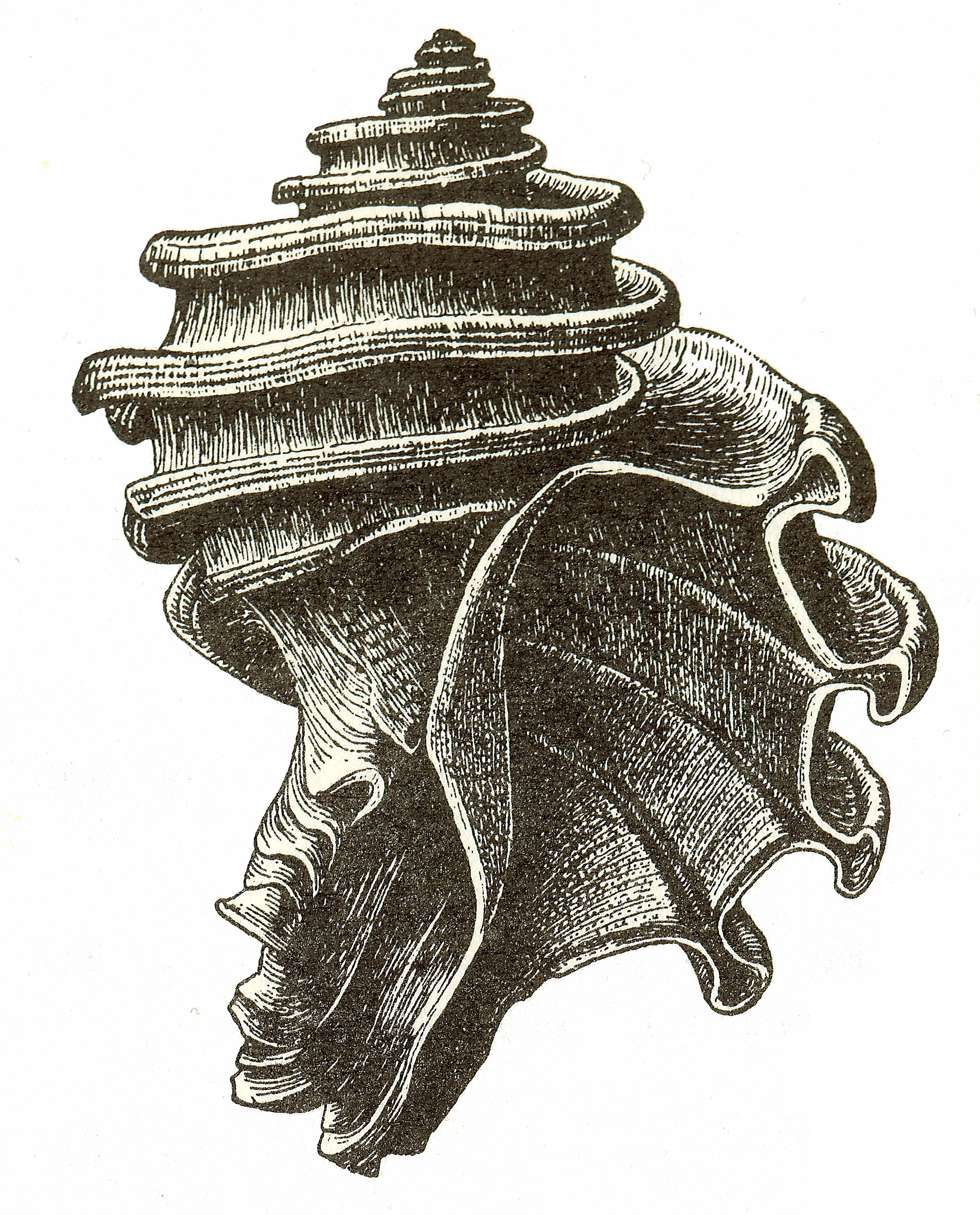
An apertural view of a shell of the ecphora known as Ecphora gardnerae gardnerae, drawn by J. C. McConnell

At the end of the Eocene, Tritonopsis disappeared from the fossil record, leaving behind its two daughter genera, Rapanecphora and Ecphorosycon. Rapanecphora would eventually become extinct during the early Miocene, while Ecphorosycon would undergo several diversification events, one during the Oligocene that produced the genus Chesathais, and two events during the early Miocene that produced the genera Siphoecphora and Trisecphora. The three-ribbed Trisecphora would then give rise to the (mostly) four-ribbed genus Ecphora, and both genera coexisted together with Chesathais and Ecphorosycon, along with Planecphora, up until midway through the Serravallian stage, when Planecphora was extirpated from the Eastern American Seaboard (surviving only in coral reefs of Florida), and all ecphora genera up to this time, save for Ecphora, itself, became extinct.

During the late Miocene, Ecphora would then give rise to two more daughter taxa, Latecphora and Globecphora. These genera persisted until their extinction during the early Pliocene. Ecphora also persisted, though, its species were slowly pushed south to coral reefs in southern Florida due to climate changes turning the Eastern Seaboard from tropical/subtropical to temperate. Eventually, by the end of the early Pliocene, Ecphora and Planecphora were restricted to the Everglades Pseudoatoll, until their extinction due to competition by newer murex genera invading from the Caribbean.
