= Trisecphora =

Trisecphora Temporal range: Langhian–Serravallian

Scientific classification
- Kingdom: Animalia
- Phylum: Mollusca
- Class: Gastropoda
- Subclass: Caenogastropoda
- Order: Neogastropoda
- Family: Muricidae
- Subfamily: Ocenebrinae
- Genus: †Trisecphora; Petuch, 1988

Type species
- Ecphora tricostata Martin, 1908

Extinct genus of gastropods

Trisecphora is a genus of extinct predatory ocenebrinid murexes indigenous to the Miocene coastline of what is now Maryland, North Carolina, and Virginia from the Aquitanian stage until their extinction near the end of the Serravallian. The common name for this genus and their relatives is "ecphora"(s).

== Etymology ==
The name "Ecphora" is Greek, meaning "bearing out." The word was originally used by Vitruvius to signify the projecture of a member or moulding of a column, and here refers to the distinctive "T-shaped" ribs that project from the shell. The prefix "tris" is added to denote how all members of the genus have three ribs.

== Subdivisions ==
As originally proposed by Petuch in 1988, Trisecphora was presented as a precursor subgenus of Ecphora (sensu stricto), even though a subgenus can not technically precede the genus that contains it. Later, Petuch would promote Trisecphora to the status of full genus.

=== List of species ===
- T. chamnessi (Petuch, 1989)
- T. eccentrica (Petuch, 1989)
- T. prunicola (Petuch, 1988)
- T. schmidti (Petuch, 1989)
- T. tricostata (Martin, 1904) (type species, synonym = Ecphora tricostata)
- T. martini (Petuch, 1988)
- T. scientistensis (Petuch, 1992)
- T. bartoni (Petuch and Drolshagen, 2010)
- T. smithae (Petuch, 1988)
- T. patuxentia (Petuch, 1989)
- T. shattucki (Petuch, 1989)

== Evolution ==
Trisecphora is one of three daughter genera of the Oligocene to Miocene ecphora Ecphorosycon, the other two being Siphoecphora, and Chesathais. Trisecphora and its sister genera diverged from Ecphorosycon during a speciation event during the Aquitanian epoch in the Chesapeake Bay. During the Langhian epoch, Trisecphora underwent its own speciation event where several species, and the first of a divergent lineage, Ecphora wardi of genus Ecphora, were produced. Species of Trisecphora coexisted with Ecphorosycon, Chesathais, and Ecphora (together with its subgenus Planecphora), until the beginning of the Serravallian, when Ecphorosycon went extinct (Trisecphora's sister genus, Siphoecphora would later go extinct during the Langhian). Trisecphora, itself, would go extinct during the middle of the Serravallian when a warming event killed the last species of that genus and of Chesathais off, as well as extirpating Planecphora (which would survive until the Pliocene in Floridian coral reefs).
