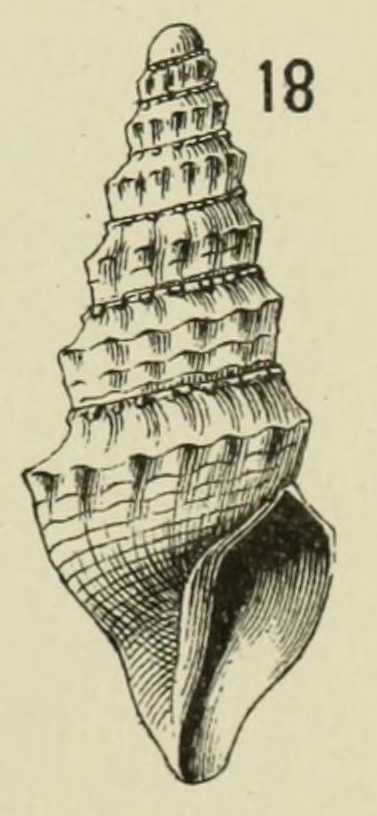
- Illustration of C. premorra by J. C. McConnell.

Scientific classification
- Kingdom: Animalia
- Phylum: Mollusca
- Class: Gastropoda
- Subclass: Caenogastropoda
- Order: Neogastropoda
- Superfamily: Conoidea
- Family: Pseudomelatomidae
- Genus: Crassispira
- Species: C. premorra

Binomial name
- Crassispira premorra (W. H. Dall, 1889)

Synonyms
- Drillia premorra Dall, 1889

= Crassispira premorra =

Species of gastropod

Crassispira premorra is a species of sea snail, a marine gastropod mollusk in the family Pseudomelatomidae. It was described by William Healey Dall in 1889.

== Description ==
The length of the shell attains 9.5 mm, its diameter 3.5 mm.

(Original description) The waxen white shell has a vitreous white smooth rounded protoconch of nearly two whorls and eight subsequent sculptured whorls. The spiral sculpture consists of an undulated more or less nodulous narrow band in front of the suture, separated by the fasciole from an angulation, which in the upper whorls is peripheral, and on the body whorl forms a well marked shoulder. In front of this on the upper whorls are one to three, and on the body whorl between the angle and the anterior end of the siphonal canal about a dozen, small sharply elevated threads with much wider interspaces, threads which are, where they intersect the transverse ridges, modified by small sharp nodulations. The transverse sculpture consists of (on the body whorl 14 to 18) sharp-edged low narrow oblique strongly bent ridges rather than ribs, evanescent on the base and fasciole, but corresponding to the elevations on the presutural band. These are proportionally stronger and more prominent near the apex, and become obsolete on the last part of the body whorl. The suture is distinct. The whorls are moderately full. The base of the shell is subconical, slightly constricted for the short siphonal canal. The incremental lines are distinct, stronger on the body whorl. The fasciole is somewhat excavated, smooth except for the curved incremental lines. The surface of the shell is rather vitreous. The aperture of the (not adult) shell is rather wide. The wide anal notch is rather shallow. The outer lip is arched. The siphonal canal is hardly differentiated, short, and narrow. The columella is straight and anteriorly attenuated.

== Distribution ==
It is found in the Gulf of Mexico from Georgia to northwest Cuba, at depths of 183–732 m (600–2,402 ft), in the benthic zone
