= Mangelia chariessa =

Scientific classification
- Kingdom: Animalia
- Phylum: Mollusca
- Class: Gastropoda
- Subclass: Caenogastropoda
- Order: Neogastropoda
- Superfamily: Conoidea
- Family: Mangeliidae
- Genus: Mangelia
- Species: M. chariessa

Binomial name
- Mangelia chariessa (J. A. Gardner, 1947)

Synonyms
- Cythara chariessa (J. A. Gardner, 1937); Cytharella chariessa (J. A. Gardner, 1937)

Extinct species of gastropod

Mangelia chariessa, also known by Cythara chariessa and Cytharella chariessa, is an extinct species of sea snail, a marine gastropod in the family Mangeliidae.

== Description ==
The length of the shell of Mangelia chariessa measures 5.8 mm, and its diameter is 2.5 mm.

== Distribution ==
This extinct marine species was found in the Alum Bluff Group in Florida, USA.
