= Vexillum ctenotum =

Scientific classification
- Kingdom: Animalia
- Phylum: Mollusca
- Class: Gastropoda
- Subclass: Caenogastropoda
- Order: Neogastropoda
- Superfamily: Turbinelloidea
- Family: Costellariidae
- Genus: Vexillum
- Species: V. ctenotum

Binomial name
- Vexillum ctenotum J. Gardner, 1937

Species of gastropod

Vexillum ctenotum is an extinct species of sea snail, a marine gastropod mollusk, in the family Costellariidae, the ribbed miters.

== Description ==
The length of the shell attains 6 mm.

== Distribution ==
Fossils of this marine species were found in the Alum Bluff Formation, Florida before extinction in the Miocene epoch.
