= Mangelia compsacosta =

Scientific classification
- Kingdom: Animalia
- Phylum: Mollusca
- Class: Gastropoda
- Subclass: Caenogastropoda
- Order: Neogastropoda
- Superfamily: Conoidea
- Family: Mangeliidae
- Genus: Mangelia
- Species: M. compsacosta

Binomial name
- Mangelia compsacosta (J. Gardner, 1947)

Synonyms
- Ithycythara compsacostaJ. Gardner, 1937

Extinct species of gastropod

Mangelia compsacosta is an extinct species of sea snail, a marine gastropod mollusk in the family Mangeliidae.

== Description ==
The length of the shell attains 5.8 mm, its diameter is 2 mm.

== Distribution ==
This extinct marine species was found in the Alum Bluff Group, Florida, USA.
