= Florence Bascom =

American professor of geology (1862–1945)

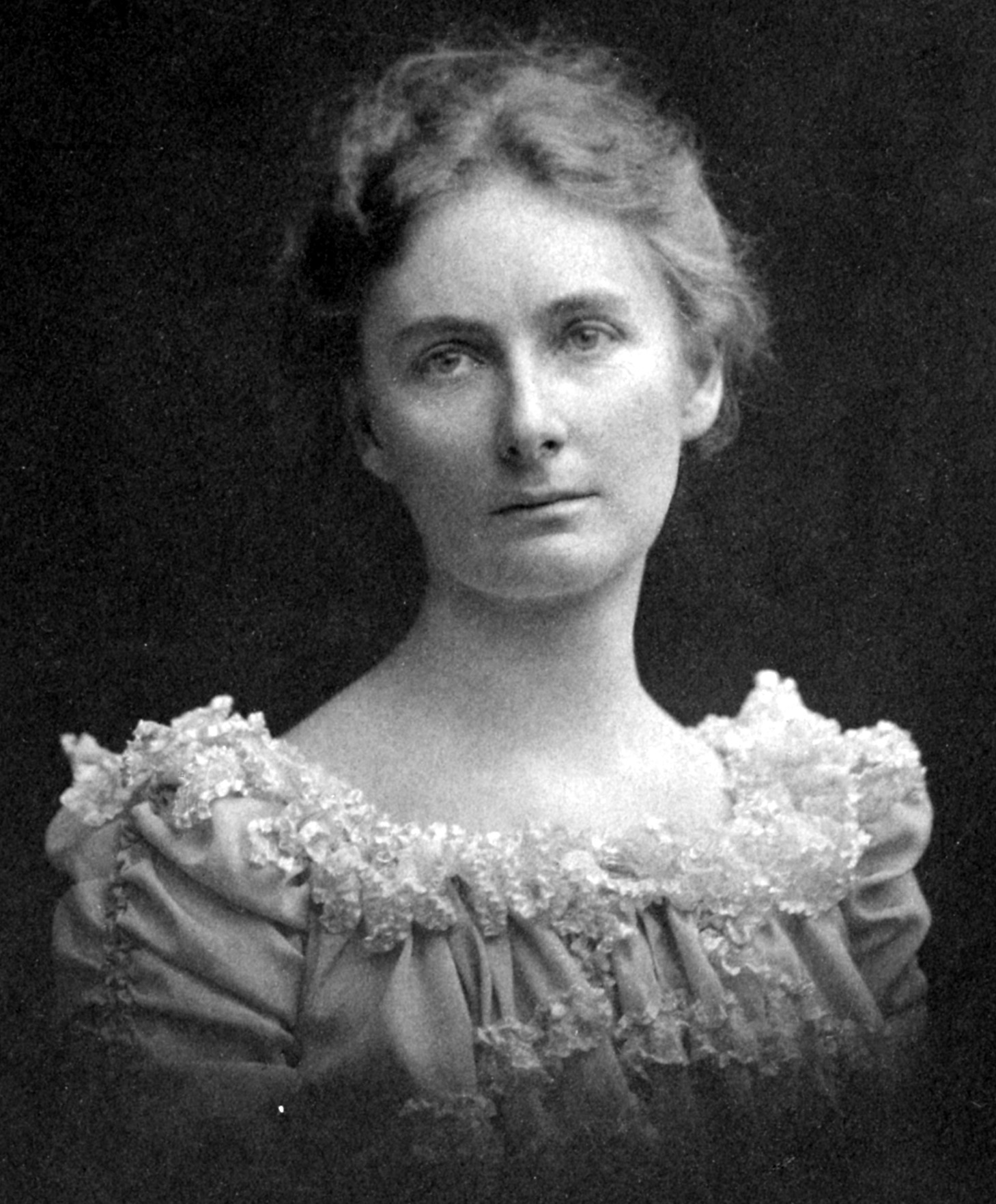
- Florence Bascom, circa 1900.
- Born: July 14, 1862; Williamstown, Massachusetts
- Died: June 18, 1945 (aged 82); Williamstown, Massachusetts
- Education: University of Wisconsin, Madison, B.A. 1882, B.S. 1884, M.S. 1887; Johns Hopkins University, Ph.D. 1893
- Known for: Geology; Petrology; Geology education
- Awards: Fellow of the Geological Society of America (1894)
- Scientific career
- Fields: Geology
- Workplaces: United States Geological Survey; Rockford University; Bryn Mawr College; Ohio State University
- Thesis: A Contribution to the Geology of South Mountain, Pennsylvania (1893)
- Academic advisors: Roland Duer Irving; Charles R. Van Hise; George Huntington Williams

Florence Bascom (July 14, 1862 – June 18, 1945) was a pioneer American woman geologist and educator. Bascom was the second woman to earn a PhD in geology in the United States, following Mary Emilie Holmes. She received her PhD in 1893 from Johns Hopkins University and was the first woman to earn a PhD at the institution in any field. In 1896 Bascom became the first woman to work for the United States Geological Survey. Bascom also founded the department of geology at Bryn Mawr College where she trained many leading women geologists.

== Early life ==
Florence Bascom was born in Williamstown, Massachusetts, on July 14, 1862, the youngest of five children. Bascom came from a family which, unlike most at the time, encouraged women's education and participation in public life. Her father John Bascom was then a professor at rhetoric at Williams College. In 1874 her father became the president of the University of Wisconsin and the family moved out west to Madison. Her mother, Emma Curtiss Bascom, was a women's rights activist involved in the suffrage movement. Her parents were steadfast supporters of women's rights and encouraged women to obtain a college education. In 1875, one year after John Bascom took office, the University of Wisconsin began accepting female students. Bascom Hill, within the Madison campus, was later named after her father.

Florence Bascom had a very close relationship with her father and he played a very influential role in her life. He was the driving factor of her career and her first contact in the field of geology. Her father had struggled with mental illness and would often take his children exploring into the mountains. It was a drive with her father who pointed out a landscape that she did not understand, which intrigued her enough to learn about the earth and its geologic processes. These explorations and the various scientific instruments they had in their household encouraged her to have an interest in sciences. Florence graduated with high grades from Madison High School at the age of 16.

== Education ==
Bascom graduated from the University of Wisconsin with two bachelor's degrees. The first degree was in arts which was received in 1882 and the second was a Bachelor of Science in 1884. Bascom also received her master's in geology in 1887 at the same university and this is where she discovered her interest in geology but specifically in the very unknown field at that time – petrography. After completing her master's, Bascom enrolled at Johns Hopkins University when it allowed women to attend graduate school and continued her studies in petrography there. Bascom's thesis was on "A Contribution to the Geology of South Mountain, Pennsylvania". In 1893, Bascom graduated from Johns Hopkins with her PhD, making her the first woman to graduate the university with that degree and the second woman in the United States to earn a PhD in geology.

While attending the University of Wisconsin, Bascom was a member of the Kappa Kappa Gamma chapter and was one of the first members to join an all women's fraternities between 1867 and 1902.

== Career ==
After receiving her PhD, Bascom spent the next two years as an instructor and associate professor at Ohio State University teaching geology. Bascom then went on to Bryn Mawr College and founded the department of geology in 1895 which led to it becoming one of the best departments in the country. Bascom was appointed assistant geologist, on the U.S. Geological Survey and later was assigned that section of the Piedmont which lies in Maryland, Pennsylvania and part of New Jersey, making her the first woman to receive that title. In 1899 Bascom went on to teach petrography and by 1906 Bascom became a full professor and had an associate. Bascom spent many summers mapping the schists and gneisses of that area and studied the thin sections of the rocks both during summer and winter. This area of work came with great complexity, however Bascom's work and careful study provided much clarification. Throughout her career of thirty-three years, Bascom continued to work at Bryn Mawr College and retired when the college had just expanded its science building. By 1924, Bascom became a councillor of the Geological Society of America and in 1930 she was appointed as vice-president of that society making her the only woman to have ever held those offices. Bascom's career consisted of her being an associate editor of the American Geologist from 1896-1905, during this time she was the first woman to present a paper before the Geological Society of Washington, a member of the National Academy of Sciences, the National Research Council, as well as the Geophysical Union and many other scientific societies. Bascom had also written many short papers, some which were in the field of geomorphology. In 1906 Bascom was the only woman voted as one of the top 100 geologists in the country in the first edition of American Men of Science. Bascom also taught at Hampton Institute of Negroes and American Indians, later renamed Hampton University (1884–1885), Rockford College (1887–1889) and Ohio State University (1903–1895).

== Work ==
Florence Bascom contributed to a special type of identification for acidic volcanoes. Her article, "The Structures, Origin, and Nomenclature of Acidic Volcanic Rocks of South Mountain", begins by identifying various rock structures formed by the volcano. Bascom argues that South Mountain's rock formations have changed over time, with some rocks originally showing signs of being rhyolite, but now holocrystalline rock. These rocks defy the nomenclature used to identify rocks invented by German and English scientists, so she created prefixes to add to these pre-existing names, to identify acidic changes in rocks. The prefixes she came up with are meta-, epi-, and apo-.

Bascom presented a second notable new conclusion regarding the cycles of erosion within Pennsylvania; earlier scientific thought was that the Piedmont province of Pennsylvania was made by two to three erosion cycles, while she discovered that there were at least nine cycles. Bascom found this by compiling a stratigraphic record of Atlantic deposit in the province, listing the depth, unconformities, and different grain sizes (like sand, clay, or gravel). The cycles occurred over a large period of time, with six cycles occurring in the post-Cretaceous period and three occurring in the Cretaceous period. This conclusion gave scientists new ideas about erosion cycles regarding their rate of occurrence and how to define a cycle. In 1896, Bascom worked as an assistant for the USGS. Her role in the team was to study crystalline schists in a square degree of area along eastern Pennsylvania and Maryland, as well as a portion of northwest Delaware. For part of her life as a teacher, Bascom simultaneously worked in the geological survey and her work lead to a multitude of comprehensive reports of geologic folios.

Bascom spent a year learning and researching advanced crystallography in the laboratory of Victor Goldschmidt in Heidelberg before going back to teaching as she did not want to spend time doing "overspecialistic research", that she would not be able to teach to her students in the courses offered.

Bascom's specialization in petrography focused on complex layers of rocks and mountains. The formations that took place there had been regarded as sediments previously however, the closer study of it done under microscopes proved them to be altered volcanics and not sediments which Bascom then named "aporhyolites" with the prefix of "apo-".

At Bryn Mawr College, geology was considered adjunct in comparison to other natural sciences. Her workspace consisted of storage space in a building constructed solely for chemistry and biology. Over a two-year period, Bascom managed to develop a substantial collection of minerals, fossils, and rocks. Bascom founded Bryn Mawr's department of geology in 1895 and proceeded to teach and train a generation of young women in this department. In the first third of the 20th century, Bascom's graduate program was considered to be one of the most rigorous in the country, with a strong focus on both lab and fieldwork. It was known for training the most American female geologists. Her students did not just graduate, they often succeeded in important geology careers for themselves. Additionally during WW II some of her students were involved in confidential work for the Military Geology Unit in the U.S. Geological Survey. Bascom was known to set high standards for her students as well as herself. Though she was extremely tough, her students were grateful for the quality of education that she gave to them. In 1928, Bascom retired but continued to work at the United States Geological Survey until 1936.

== Notable mentors ==
Bascom trained under experts in metamorphism and crystallography. Bascom's choice of study was strongly influenced by Roland Duer Irving, a professor at the University of Wisconsin, and Charles R. Van Hise, who was Irving's assistant. In the years Bascom worked under the two, 1884–1887, the Geological Survey in Washington had established a division of glacial geology, motivating her to enter the field of petrography and structural geology. This led Bascom to the discovery of "aporhyolites".

George Huntington Williams (1856–1894): Bascom met George Huntington Williams through her early mentor Irving, and later worked with Williams in field research while she was at Johns Hopkins University. Bascom began her studies at Hopkins, and was told there was a chance she would not get her degree because she was a woman. Williams supported her and she later received her PhD.

Edward Francis Baxter Orton (1829–1899): Bascom worked with Edward Francis Baxter Orton while she was at Ohio State University.

Victor Mordechai Goldschmidt (1853–1933): Bascom studied crystallography under Victor Mordechai Goldschmidt while on leave in Germany in 1906–1907.

== Legacy ==
Florence Bascom has an everlasting legacy as both a pioneering Earth scientist and a valiant advocate for female presence in scientific discussion and higher education. Breaking through systemic gender barriers in the late nineteenth century, she became the first woman to earn a Ph.D. She produced foundational research on crystalline rocks and geomorphology. Beyond her more than 40 scientific publications and innovative geologic maps she founded the geology department at Bryn Mawr college, Transforming it into one of the nations most astound programs. Through rigorous schooling and academic standards, she introduced nearly an entire generation of American women to the possibility of women succeeding in STEM. Not only did Bascom have immense influence on the systems we use to study contemporary geology, but she permanently reshaped the demographic of the discipline. Bascom trained and mentored Louise Kingsley, Katharine Fowler-Billings, petrologist Anna Jonas Stose, petrologist Eleanora Bliss Knopf, crystallographer Mary Porter, paleontologist Julia Gardner, petroleum geologist Maria Stadnichenko, glacial geomorphologist Ida Ogilvie, Isabel Fothergill Smith, Dorothy Wyckoff, and Anna Heitonen.

Bascom's students went on to become successful scientists, and some were featured in American Men of Science. Those featured were Ida Ogilvie, Eleanor Bliss (Knopf), Anna Jonas (Stose), Isabel Smith, and Julia Gardner.

== Death ==
Bascom died of a stroke (cerebral hemorrhage) on June 18, 1945, at the age of 82. She is buried in a Williams College cemetery in Williamstown, close to family members.

== Named in honor of Florence Bascom ==
- Bascom Crater on Venus
- 6084 Bascom, an asteroid discovered in 1985
- Glacial Lake Bascom, a prehistoric, postglacial lake located in what is now northern Berkshire County, Massachusetts, formed when receding glacial ice acted as a dam and prevented drainage of the Hoosic River watershed.
- The U.S. Geological Survey's Florence Bascom Geoscience Center located in Reston, Virginia
- The Geological Society of America's Florence Bascom Geologic Mapping Award
- The Bascom Undergraduate Teaching Laboratories at the Homewood Campus of Johns Hopkins University

== Publications ==
Florence Bascom published over 40 articles on genetic petrography, geomorphology (specifically the provenance of surficial deposits), and gravel. Her own account of her youth in Madison may be found in the Wisconsin Magazine of History with the title "The University in 1874–1887", March 1925.

- "John Bascom's Signature" The Wisconsin Magazine of History, June 1925
- "The Geology of the Crystalline Rocks of Cecil County" Maryland Geological Survey (1902)
- "The ancient volcanic rocks of South Mountain, Pennsylvania" Pennsylvania US Geological Survey Bulletin No. 136 (1896)
- "Water resources of the Philadelphia district" US Geological Survey Water-Supply Paper No. 106 (1904)
- "Geology and mineral resources of the Quakertown-Doylestown district, Pennsylvania and New Jersey" Edgar Theodore Wherry and George Willis Stose. US Geological Survey Bulletin No. 828 (1931)
- "Elkton-Wilmington folio, Maryland-Delaware-New Jersey-Pennsylvania" with B.L. Miller. Geologic Atlas of the United States; Folio No. 211 (1920)
- American Mineralogist, Volume 31, 1946
- Bryn Mawr Alumnae Bulletin, November 1945; spring, 1965
- Science, September 1945
- University of Wisconsin Department of Geology and Geophysics Alumni Newsletter, 1991
- Arnold, Lois Barber, Four Lives in Sciences, Schocken Books, 1984
- Smith, Isabel F., The Stone Lady: A Memoir of Florence Bascom, Bryn Mawr College, 1981

== See also ==
- Timeline of women in science
