= Eleanora Knopf =

American geologist

Eleanora Frances Bliss Knopf
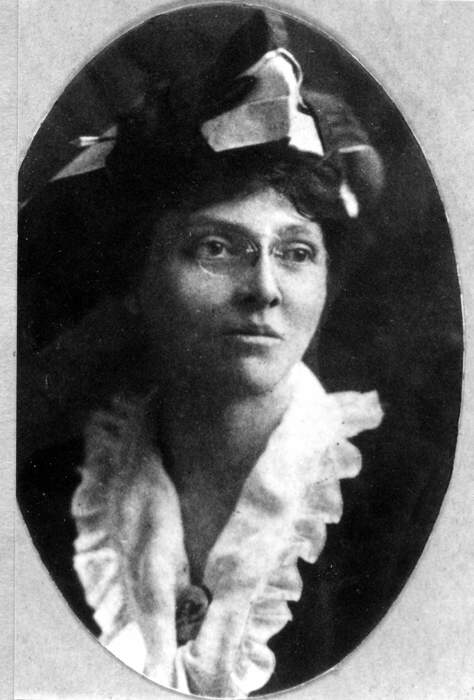
- 1928 US Geological Survey ID Portrait
- Born: Eleanora Frances Bliss; July 15, 1883; Rosemont, Pennsylvania
- Died: January 21, 1974 (aged 90); Menlo Park, California
- Occupation: Geologist

Eleanora Frances Knopf (née Bliss; July 15, 1883 – January 21, 1974) was an American geologist who worked for the United States Geological Survey (USGS) and did research in the Appalachians during the first two decades of the twentieth century. She studied at Bryn Mawr College, and earned a bachelor's degree in chemistry, a master's degree in geology, and a Ph.D. in geology in 1912. She was the first American geologist to use the new technique of petrography which she pioneered in her life's work - the study of Stissing Mountain.

== Early life ==
Eleanora Frances Bliss was born in Rosemont, Pennsylvania on July 15, 1883. Her father was General Tasker Howard Bliss — a career soldier who became Chief of Staff of the US Army during the First World War as well as a principal representative of the United States in the Allied Councils. Her mother was Eleanora Emma (Anderson) Bliss. Both sides of the family could trace their ancestry to settlers from England. The Bliss family home was located near crystalline rocks which she later studied. She married geologist Adolph Knopf, in 1920. They did not have children of their own, but she became a stepmother to his three children, who were already of school age at the time.

== Education ==
She received her early education from Florence Baldwin School. She attended Bryn Mawr College, where she earned her bachelor's degree in 1904. She was a student of a remarkable woman and geologist Florence Bascom who was praised for her pioneering findings in Geology and had a major influence in the next generation of female geologists, including Eleanora Knopf, who studied the field. While Knopf was not recognized by Yale University for her accomplishments, she still extended her knowledge to others who specialized in Geology, especially the study of metamorphic rocks, and had started the Geology department at Florence Baldwin School. Knopf completed both her undergraduate and graduate studies under Bascom. Eleanora worked as a demonstrator in the geology lab at Bryn Mawr as well as an assistant curator in the Geological Museum at the college (1904 -1909). After two years at Berkeley (1910-1911), she returned to Bryn Mawr to work with Anna Jonas Stose (another one of Bascom's students), on the study of the metamorphic rocks near the college. Stose and Bliss had followed Bascom into the study of petrology. They presented their dissertation together and received doctorates in 1912. They collaborated on multiple papers, and went on to publish the most notable ones, such as one relating to the structure of metamorphic rocks called Schists, and another regarding the geology of McCalls Ferry. She later went on to pursue a postdoctoral fellowship in geology at Johns Hopkins University (1917-1918). Eleanora was among 28 women who were elected for a fellowship, she was elected in 1919.

== Career ==
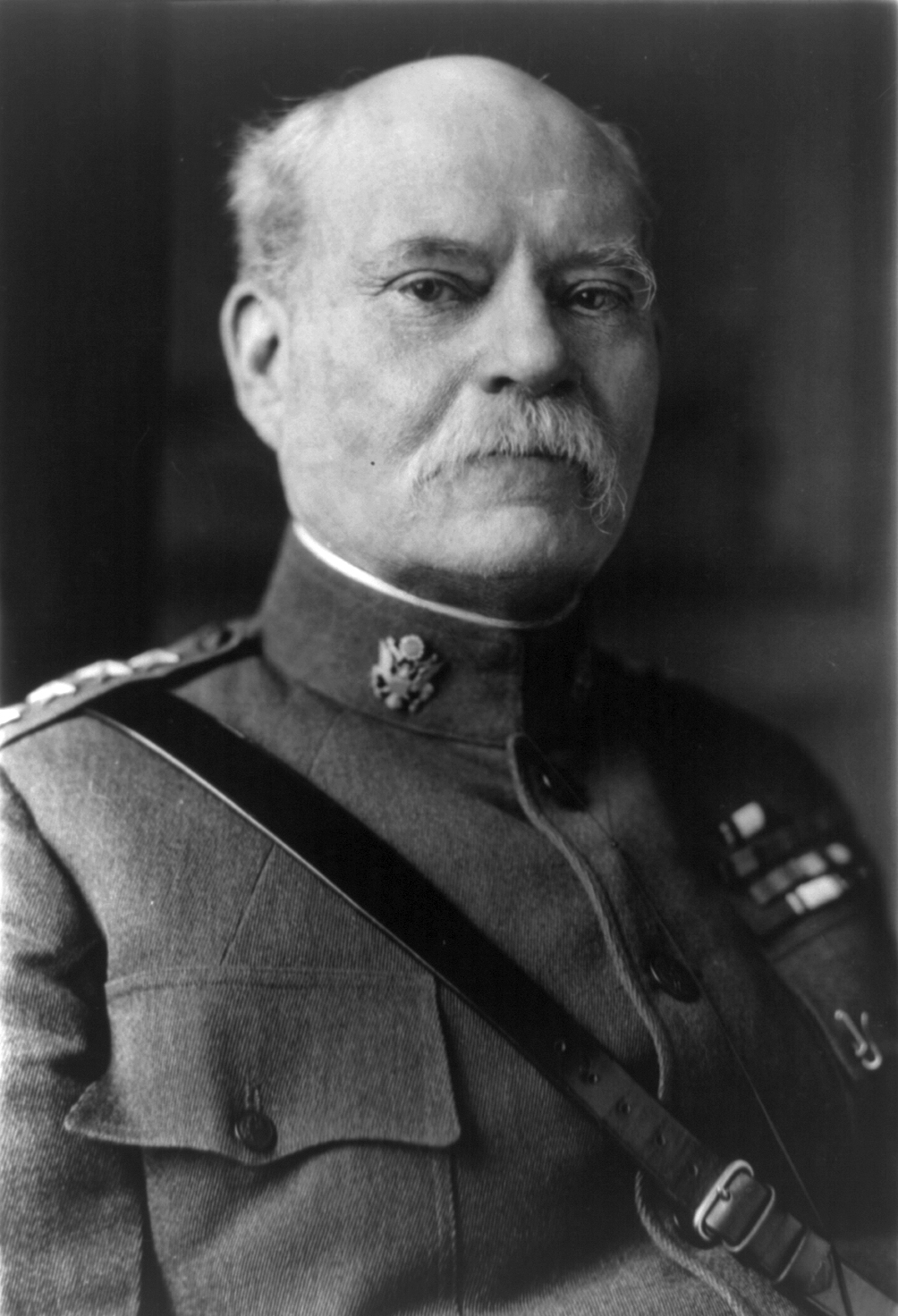
Her father, General Tasker Bliss, about 1918.

Shortly after receiving a Ph.D. in geology from Bryn Mawr and passing the civil service examinations, she went to Washington, DC to assist as a geological aide to the United States Geological Survey (USGS) in 1912 and continued her work on the metamorphic rocks on sites around Bryn Mawr. In 1913 she published her findings in the American Museum of Natural History of the first American sighting of mineral glaucophane, located in Pennsylvania which had never been found before in the east part of the Pacific Coast in the U.S. In 1917, she was promoted to a geological assistant where she worked with the Maryland State Geological Survey and the federal survey. Later in 1920, she became an official Geologist. During this time, she was never given the opportunity to teach any material in a high-level academic setting. She would still offer to teach geology students who reached out to her directly through informal teaching sessions, where she would teach them basic geologic concepts to direct field work practices. In the 1930s, she would go on to work as a visiting lecturer at both Yale and Harvard. She continued to work for the USGS until 1955 on a when actually employed basis. In 1925 she began studying the rocks of the Stissing Mountain region. This study necessitated her attentiveness for the rest of her career. These presented unusual difficulty for examination purposes due to thrust faults. After searching overseas for new ways to precisely study the region, she settled upon the methods of Bruno Sander (from Innsbruck University) in which the fine structure of the rock was examined — the grains and the optical properties. She translated his work and used it for the following 40 years in the United States for her studies, mastering this new technique. This technique of petrography was new to US geology. Her book from 1938 on the subject, Structural Petrography, brought her much distinction. Eleanora Knopf was one of several American women geologists who spent time working in the Appalachians during the twentieth century. Though she was primarily a petrologist, she made astute observations concerning inequalities in erosion in catchments and hence the survival of palaeoforms in the landscape. Although these observations were opposed to one of primary principles of geomorphology at the time, Knopf implied that remnant landforms should still survive for an extended period due to unequal erosion. As a result of her research, her findings in elation to deformation and the visual effects of the rock formations lead to the creation a new division of Geological study. In 1951, she joined Stanford University in geology department as a research associate.

She continued to study the Stissing Mountain rocks until her retirement in 1955 but also made some expeditions to the Rocky Mountains.

== Later years ==
After retiring Eleanora Knopf moved out to the Rocky Mountains with her husband (Adolph Knopf) to aid him with his studies, after his death in 1966 she devoted herself to completing his research regarding the Boulder Batholith but health complications arose for her. She died in 1974 from arteriosclerosis in Menlo Park, California, at the age of 90.

== Bibliography ==
- Oakes, Elizabeth H. (2007), Encyclopedia of World Scientists, InfoBase Publishing, ISBN 978-0816061587
- Rodgers, John (1977), " Memorial to Eleanora Bliss Knopf", Department of Geology and Geophysics, Yale University, New Haven, Connecticut, pp. 1–3.
- Aldrich, Michele L. (1980), "Knopf, Eleanora Frances Bliss", Notable American Women: The Modern Period, Harvard University Press, pp. 401–403, ISBN 9780674627338
- Aldrich, Michele L. (1993), "Women in Geology", Women of Science: Righting the Record, Indiana University Press, pp. 42–187, ISBN 9780253208132
- Commire, Anne (2007), "Knopf, Eleanora Bliss", Dictionary of Women Worldwide, Yorkin Publications, p. 1044, ISBN 9780787676766
- The Baldwin School: Eleanora Bliss Knopf, The Baldwin School, archived from the original on October 9, 2017
- Bourne, Jennifer A.; Twidale, C. Rowland (2008). "Eleanora Bliss Knopf and Unequal Erosion". Earth Sciences History. 27 (1): 132–133. Bibcode:2008ESHis..27..131B. doi:10.17704/eshi.27.1.y117972u01wx3587.
- Bourne, Jennifer A.; Twidale, C. Rowland (2008). "Eleanora Bliss Knopf and Unequal Erosion". Earth Sciences History. 27 (1): 131–135. Bibcode:2008ESHis..27..131B. doi:10.17704/eshi.27.1.y117972u01wx3587.
- Eckel, Edwin (1982). The Geological Society of America: Life History of a Learned Society, Issue 155. Boulder, Colorado: The Geological Society of America. pp. 37–38.
