= Anna Jonas Stose =

American Geologist

Anna Isabel Jonas Stose
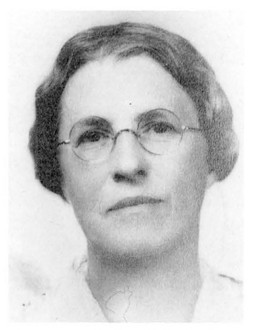
- Anna Jonas Stose
- Born: Anna Isabel Jonas; August 17, 1881; Bridgeton, N.J.
- Died: October 27, 1974 (aged 93)
- Education: Bryn Mawr College (PhD)
- Occupation: Geologist
- Spouse: George Stose
- Parents: George Jonas (father); Mary Hughes Gilbert (mother)

Anna Isabel Jonas Stose (August 17, 1881 – October 27, 1974) was a major geological pioneer, who worked for the American Museum of Natural History, Maryland Geological Survey, Pennsylvania Geological Survey, Virginia Geological Survey, and the United States Geological Survey. She is best known for her work mapping the Appalachian Mountain Range, documenting the structure of and exposure to the rock formations, and tracing crystalline rocks. Stose was among the first to implement petrographic and structural techniques to the Appalachian Mountains, which were still in development at the time. This was rare because women at this time didn't do outdoor fieldwork. She contributed largely to the Geologic Map of Virginia and the Geologic Map of the United States.

== Early life ==
Anna was the only child to George and Mary Hughes Gilbert Jonas and grew up in Bridgeton, New Jersey. Her parents ran a family-owned business called the Williamstown Glass Company where she worked during World War I as a cashier. Anna was known to be fond of her ancestry that included relatives who emigrated from New England to Cape May in the 1690s. Her lineage is made of relatives who were plantation owners in Cape May, whalers, and Delaware River Pilots. She began her mapping in Southeastern Pennsylvania and Maryland. Then on, she began her mapping Southwestward into the crystalline rocks of Virginia to North Carolina afterwards. In 1938, Anna married George Willis Stose who worked as a U.S. G.S. stratigrapher and would end up working by her side on the Appalachian Mountains.

== Education ==
Anna received formal education from Bryn Mawr College and earned her A.D in 1904. In 1905, she earned her A.M, and then her PhD in 1912. Furthermore, she had an education major in the Arts. Throughout her college career, Anna had the opportunity to work under tenured female geologists, who she would continue to work with closely after graduating from college. From 1908 to 1909, she was an assistant curator at the Geology Museum and worked extensively in the geology laboratories during college. Her classmates included Eleanora Knopf and Julia Gardner, and she mentored under Florence Bascom, one of the pioneer women of geology.

Between 1916 and 1917, she began work at the Department of Geology, following that she worked at the American Museum of Natural History.

== Geological contributions ==
Anna contributed to geology simply by being a woman during a time when women faced prejudices for being active in such a field. In her professional career as a geologist, Anna was known to be very outspoken. During Anna's long career in the scientific community, she made numerous geological contributions, including identification of structural characteristics and trends by using maps that she printed in colour. Instead of creating 5 by 6 quadrangle maps, Anna's work was focused on creating larger scaled maps. Working with Eleanora Knopf, Anna helped defined the Martic Line. They believed it to be a major thrust fault in Pennsylvania. Her ideas were often considered to be incomprehensible by other geologists at the time, as her work was far too advanced. Being a female in this time also caused scientists to often disregard or overlook her ideas. Stose and Knopf provided many contributions when it came to defining and naming important places, such as the Conestoga Limestone, this being a major part of Pennsylvania, the major units of the Blue Ridge Province, many of the granite plutons in both the Blue Ridge and Piedmont, and the Mount Rogers volcanic sequence in southern Virginia. The Piedmont and Blue Ridge provinces in the southern and central Appalachians were the locations where Anna's studies led her to one of her greatest achievements. Anna printed a map in color of the Piedmont and Blue Ridge Rocks on the 1982 Virginia State Geological map, which was not accepted in the geological community at the time, but with today's enhanced understandings and technology, we have realized her theories and findings were ultimately correct, and her discoveries are still used in science today.

== Findings from the Appalachian Mountains ==
Throughout her research over the Appalachian Mountains, Anna worked alongside her husband George W. Stose, and many of their findings were published together. Crystalline rock makes up the southern Appalachian Mountains and was mobile during the Precambrian and again during the Paleozoic era. During this time, there was intense crustal folding and intrusion to the rock formation. Once the crust folding ceased, granite rock carved through the inner part of the mountain range.

== Publications ==
Anna's publications spanned sixty years. In 1905, she published her first paper, it focused on the rocks of the crystalline Appalachians. In 1965, she published her last paper that described the cataloging of lithologies, and the potential origins of 18th-century tombstones in old cemeteries located in Cape May County, New Jersey. In her last paper she also noted that the correlation of certain rocks dated back to Early Paleozoic rocks. Anna was the first person to interpret the Brevard Zone rocks as having formed along a thrust fault. Afterwards, contrary to Stose's interpretation, other geologists saw the Brevard Zone was actually the trace of a large strike-slip fault. For many years, this idea obtained widespread acceptance, but at the present time, Stose's explanation is believed to be more accurate.

In a book called Studies of Appalachian Geology: Central and Southern, which was published in 1970 and edited by George Fisher, Stose is the geologist with the most listings in the author index. Stose and her husband, George Stose, compiled county wide reports such as the "New Holland quadrangle" (Jonas and Stose, 1926), "Geology and Mineral Resources of York County" (Stose and Jonas, 1939), "Middletowne quadrangle" (Stose and Jonas, 1933). These reports laid the foundation for southeastern Pennsylvanian geology. In 1944, the couple wrote a report on the Geology of the Hanover-York District (published by the U.S. Geological Survey). This is their only work that is formally listed as Stose and Stose, and is still acknowledged by today's geologists due to the advanced explanations and illustrations contained within the publication.

== Later life ==
Anna spent time working at the American Museum of Natural History throughout 1916 and 1917, she then worked as a geologist for the Maryland and Pennsylvania Geological Surveys between 1919 and 1937. She worked as a geologist two more times, firstly for the Virginia Geological Survey from 1926 to 1945, and secondly with the U.S. Geological Survey from 1930 until her retirement in 1954. Anna later died on October 27, 1974, due to a stroke, while George Stose died back in 1960. Her work is still used today as a tribute of her contributions to field of geology in a time when women were not recognized.
