= Brevard Fault =

Geological feature in the eastern United States

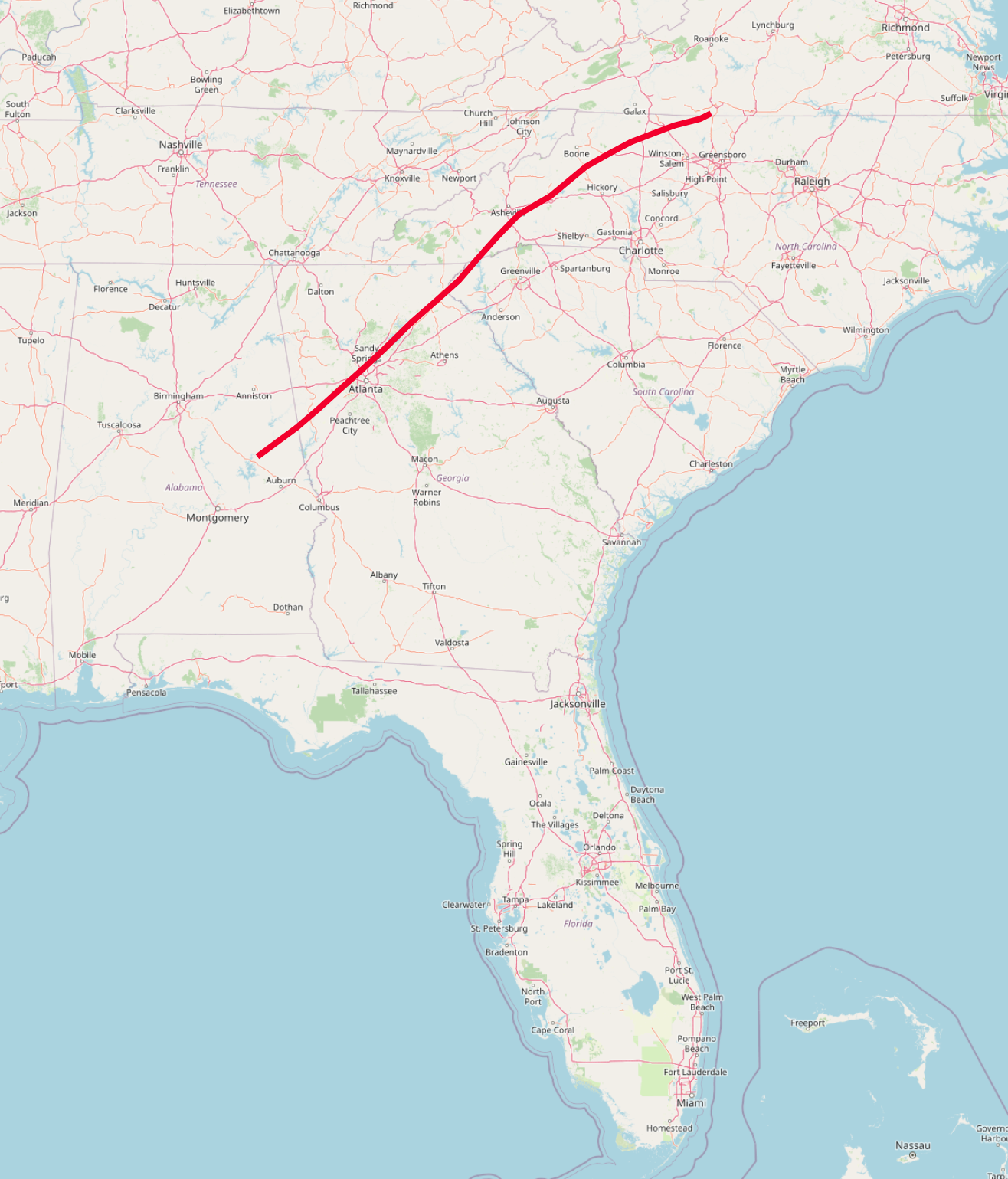
Brevard Fault Zone in its extent from Montgomery, Alabama to the North-Carolina-Virginia border.

The Brevard Fault Zone is a 700-km long and several km-wide thrust fault that extends from the North Carolina-Virginia border, runs through the north metro Atlanta area, and ends near Montgomery, Alabama. It is an important Paleozoic era feature in the uplift of the Appalachian Mountains.

== Discovery ==
Arthur Keith from the United States Geological Survey first identified an exposed segment of the Brevard Fault in 1905, believing it to be a syncline. In 1932, Anna Jonas Stose used local petrology to identify the site as a thrust fault. Stose, the first to trace the fault, is also credited with identifying that the rocks in the area must have been formed through deformation, placing the Brevard Fault in a regional perspective. Using modern methods of seismic reflection and high-resolution profiling, geologists have since discovered that the Brevard Fault Zone has undergone both thrust and strike-slip movement.

== Geology ==
The Brevard Fault Zone is a part of a much larger system of faults at the base of the Appalachian thrust sheet that played a key role in uplifting the Appalachian Mountains. The extent of its role remains uncertain because most of the fault is buried beneath Quaternary sediment. Many studies of the fault come from Grandfather Mountain in the Linville Fall Quadrangle, which contains the exposed region that was first discovered by Arthur Keith. This region is only 1–3 km of its 700 km length.

The Brevard Fault experienced multiple phases of deformation and minimal stratigraphic displacement. The Brevard Fault Zone contains diverse lithologies, but it is primarily composed of mylonitic metagraywacke, schist, amphibolite, and gneiss that underwent metamorphism 350–360 million years ago. The Fault Zone is characterized by ductile behavior as indicated by the widespread presence of mylonitic and phyllonitic rocks.

== See also ==
- Geology of Georgia (U.S. state)
- Geology of North Carolina

== Bibliography ==
- Robert D. Hatcher; Matthew T. Huebner; Justin R. Rehrer; Louis L. Acker; Paul D. Fullagar; Angang Liu; Patricia Lee Goad (September 11, 2017). Geologic and kinematic insights from far-traveled horses in the Brevard fault zone, southern Appalachians. Vol. 213. doi:10.1130/2017.1213(13). ISBN 978-0-8137-8213-3. Wikidata Q61122687.
- Nikolas I. Christensen; Daniel L. Szymanski (1988). "Origin of reflections from the Brevard Fault Zone". Journal of Geophysical Research. 93 (B2): 1087. Bibcode:1988JGR....93.1087C. doi:10.1029/JB093IB02P01087. ISSN 0148-0227. Wikidata Q105127624.
- Thomas J. Crawford; Jack H. Medlin (October 1, 1973). "The western Georgia Piedmont between the Cartersville and Brevard fault zones". American Journal of Science. 273 (8): 712–722. Bibcode:1973AmJS..273..712C. doi:10.2475/AJS.273.8.712. ISSN 0002-9599. Wikidata Q105128412.
