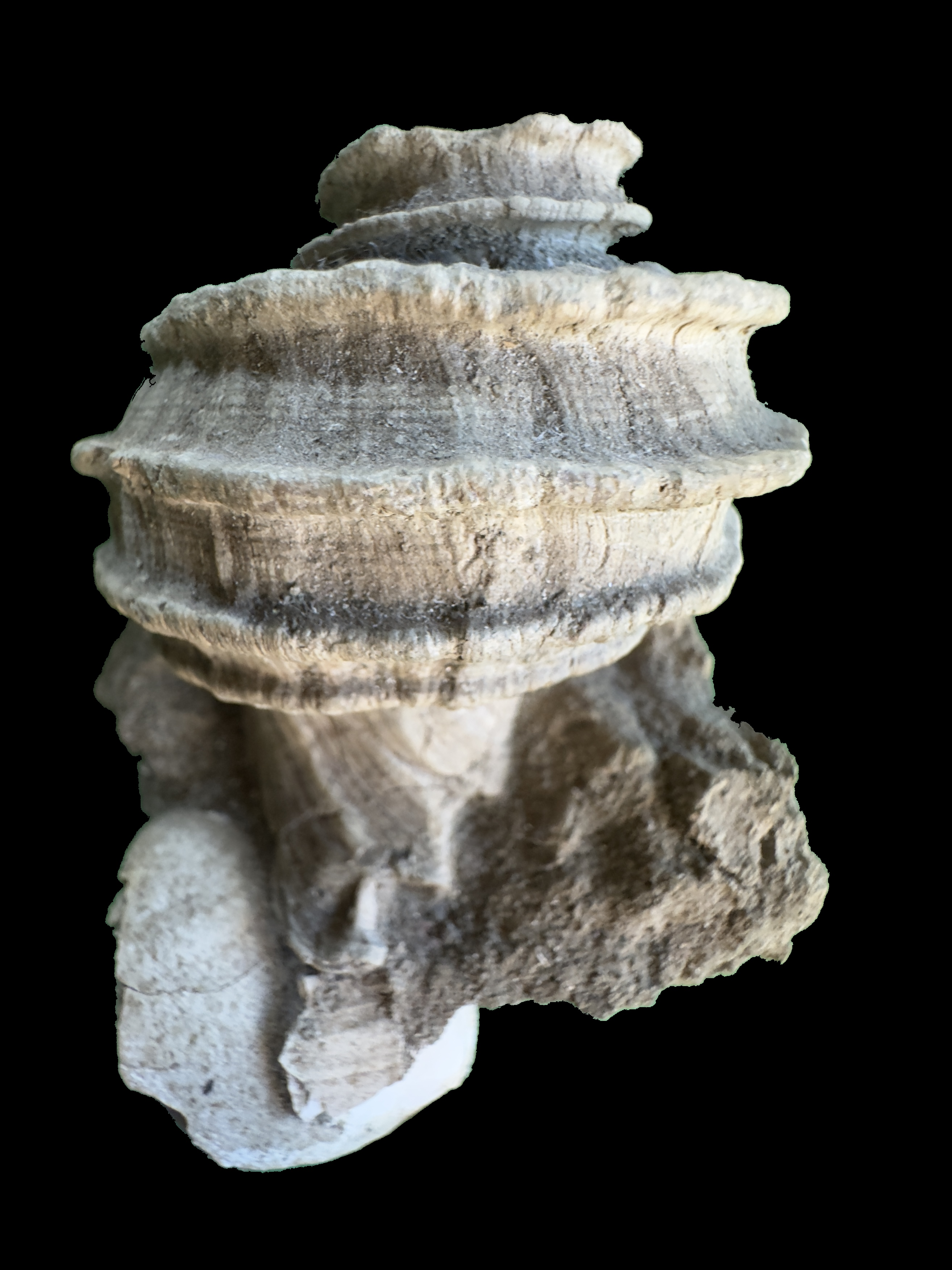
- A fossil shell of Ecphora gardnerae gardnerae

Scientific classification
- Kingdom: Animalia
- Phylum: Mollusca
- Class: Gastropoda
- Subclass: Caenogastropoda
- Order: Neogastropoda
- Family: Muricidae
- Subfamily: Ocenebrinae
- Genus: †Ecphora; Conrad, 1843

= Ecphora (genus) =

Ecphora Temporal range: Langhian–Piacenzian

Extinct genus of gastropods

Ecphora is a genus of extinct predatory ocenebrinid murexes indigenous to the North American Eastern Seaboard from Miocene until their extinction during the Pliocene. The common name for this genus and a group of related genera is "ecphora"(s).

== Etymology ==
The name "Ecphora" is Greek, meaning "bearing out." The word was originally used by Vitruvius to signify the projecture of a member or moulding of a column, and here refers to the distinctive "T-shaped" ribs that project from the shell.

== Subdivisions ==
As originally proposed by Petuch in 1988, Trisecphora was regarded as a subgenus of Ecphora (sensu stricto), as was the genus Latecphora. However, further study (by Petuch) of these two subgenera lead to their promotion to genera proper.

Currently, Ecphora is subdivided into the subgenus Planecphora, and several species complexes. Originally, the species of Planecphora consisted of the "Ecphora choptankensis Species Complex" before Petuch elevated the complex to genus status.

=== Planecphora ===
- Planecphora (Petuch, 1988) Miocene Maryland and Virginia
- Planecphora vokesi (Petuch, 1988) Miocene Maryland and Virginia
- Planecphora choptankensis (Petuch, 1988) (nominate species) Miocene Maryland and Virginia
- Planecphora delicata (Petuch, 1988) Miocene Maryland and Virginia
- Planecphora hertweckorum (Petuch, 1987) Pliocene Florida
- Planecphora mansfieldi (Petuch, 1989) Pliocene Florida

=== Ecphora (sensu stricto) ===
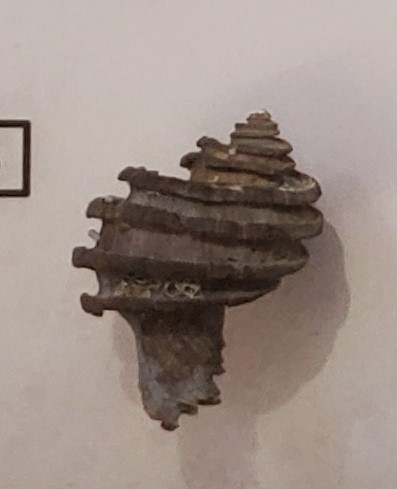
Ecphora gardnerae fossil

==== Ecphora gardnerae Species Complex ====
- E. wardi Petuch, 1988
- E. calvertensis Petuch, 1988
- E. chesapeakensis Petuch, 1992
- E. williamsi Ward and Gilinsky, 1988
- E. conoyensis Petuch, 2004
- E. asheri Petuch, 1988
- E.germonae Ward and Gilinsky, 1988
- E. gardnerae gardnerae Wilson, 1987(nominate subspecies = Ecphora gardneri)
- E. gardnerae angusticostata Petuch, 1989
- E. whiteoakensis Ward and Gilinsky, 1988
- E. streami (Petuch, 1994) Pliocene
- E. pachycostata (Petuch, 1989) Pliocene

==== Ecphora meganae Species Complex ====
- E. mattinglyi Petuch, 2004
- E. sandgatensis Petuch, 1989
- E. meganae Ward and Gilinsky, 1988
- E. amyae Petuch and Drolshagen, 2010
- E. roxaneae Petuch, 1991

==== Ecphora rikeri Species Complex ====
- E. harasewychi Petuch, 1989
- E. rikeri Petuch, 1988

==== Ecphora quadricostata Species Complex ====
- E. floridana Petuch, 1989
- E. kochi Ward and Gilinsky, 1988
- E. quadricostata quadricostata (Say, 1824 (nominate subspecies = Ecphora quadricostata)
- E. quadricostata rachelae Petuch, 1988
- E. striatula Petuch, 1986
- E. umbilicata Petuch, 1986

== Evolution ==
Ecphora is derived from the slightly older Trisecphora, diverging during the Langhian epoch. The oldest species is E. wardi, found in the Plum Point Member of the Calvert Formation. Later during the Miocene, daughter genera, in the form of Latecphora, and Globecphora, and Planecphora split off during the early Pliocene, persisting in a coral atoll in what is now the Everglades until the late Piacenzian epoch of the late Pliocene, when remaining species of both Ecphora and Planecphora were driven to extinction due to encroachment by new murexes invading from the south.
