= Isabel Fothergill Smith =

Geology professor from Greeley, Colorado

Isabel Fothergill Smith A.B., 1915; A.M., 1919; PhD., 1922
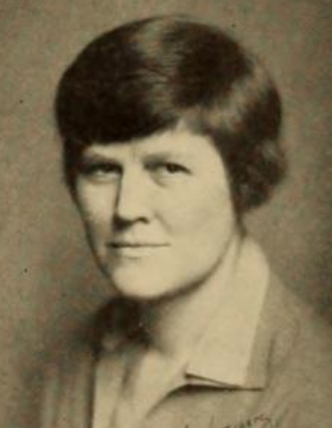
- Isabel Fothergill Smith, from the 1929 yearbook of Smith College
- Born: November 15, 1890; Greeley, Colorado
- Died: September 16, 1990 (aged 99)
- Resting place: Linn Grove Cemetery
- Education: Bryn Mawr College
- Occupation: Geologist
- Known for: Geology professor
- Father: Frederic Elias Smith

Isabel Fothergill Smith (November 15, 1890 – September 16, 1990) was a geology professor from Greeley, Colorado. She studied geology at Bryn Mawr College under her mentor Florence Bascom. Smith published various articles as a student and a memoir on Bascom later during her retirement. Beginning her career as an associate professor of geology at Smith College, Isabel later became the first dean of Scripps College, a prestigious women's liberal arts college.

== Early life ==
Isabel Fothergill Smith was born in Greeley, Colorado, on November 15, 1890, as the youngest of four daughters. Her family moved to Los Angeles, California, in her early teens. Her father was a student of Cornell University, and her sisters had attended the University of Colorado, Stanford and Columbia University. In 1909, her father was killed in a horse and buggy accident. After her father's death, Smith's mother would be unable to provide funding for an education similar to her siblings, however a cousin with ties to Bryn Mawr College provided her the chance to pursue a bachelor's degree, guiding her along a path that would begin her mentorship under Professor Florence Bascom.

== Education ==
Given her family's background within education, Isabel thought she would have no issue pursuing her studies at any institute she saw as fit. However, after her father's death in 1909, financial hardships made any such opportunity uncertain. A cousin whose sister studied at Bryn Mawr College funded the opportunity for Isabel to pursue a bachelor's degree at the same institute. For the 1918–19 school year, Isabel Smith is listed as both the recipient of the President's European Fellow award and as a fellow in geology. Isabel Fothergill Smith gained her bachelor's degree from Bryn Mawr alongside the help of Florence Bascom, a professor known for her accomplishments as one of the first woman geologists, and the first woman in America to achieve a PhD in geology. She continued her studies within this circle and obtained her master's degree, publishing "A columbite crystal from Boothwyn, Pennsylvania." In this research article she studied the relationship between columbite and granitic, pegmatitic and metamorphic rocks. She adds particular attention to a well-developed crystal from Boothwyn, Delaware County, that is held in Bryn Mawr College. The crystal came from Naaman Creek, Southwest of Boothwyn, in a pegmatite mass.

After she received her master's, Bascom recommended an M. Carey Thomas European Fellowship from Bryn Mawr to Smith, enabling her to study mineralogy in Paris for a year (1920–1921). During this time, she was able to work and study with Professor A. Lacroix at the Université de Paris, whilst also finding value in listening to Professor Haüy's lectures. Following this, Smith completed her Ph.D. at Bryn Mawr, writing her dissertation: "Anorthosite in the Piedmont province of Pennsylvania." Here Smith pursues towards understanding the origin of anorthosite. She studied a small body of anorthosite in Honeybrook, Pennsylvania, more specifically, in Chester County. The evidence she finds gives support to Bowen's theory of the origin of anorthosite. From the evidence she gathered, she concluded that it was never in the form of a fluid. This was once published in the Pan-American Geologist.

== Career ==
Isabel F. Smith came to Smith college as a geology teacher in 1923 and quickly became a greatly beloved member of Smith College. For the 1924–25 school year, Smith is listed as an instructor, teaching the following courses: general geology, glacial geology, petrology, and special advanced work. For the 1925–26 school year, Smith is listed as an assistant professor, instructing the following courses: general geology, mineralogy, special phases of the quaternary ice age, petrology, and special advanced work. She taught these same courses for the 1926–27 school year. From 1927 to 1928, she again served as an assistant professor, returning to teach general geology, meteorology, mineralogy, petrology special advanced work, and this time, lithology. For the 1928–29 school year, Smith only taught mineralogy, lithology, petrology, and special advanced work. During the 1927–28 school year, Isabel was a member of the summer reading standing committee. During the 1928–29 school year, Isabel Smith served on the Smith College board of Admission, and in February 1929 the school held a board of trustees meeting where Smith received a promotions from Assistant Professor to Associate Professor in the field of geology.

In 1929 Florence Bascom wrote a letter of recommendation for Smith to Scripps College, a private women's liberal arts college. And in the following July edition of Smith College's Alumnae Quarterly, it was announced that after seeing several visitors from other institutions looking to recruit Smith College's, Isabel F. Smith would be departing to join Scripps College of Claremont California, where she had family members. This came just as Smith was in the hospital recovering from an unknown illness. In her absence, Leona Gabel of the Department of History assumed her responsibilities as Dean of the Class of 1932.

She was interested in Scripps College as she was excited to promote education programs that would go against disciplinary boundaries. As dean, she encouraged a more intellectual agenda that would encourage interdisciplinary programs and student life. Dr. Smith was responsible for students’ well-being, and she often dealt with student misbehaviour, such as staying out too late. Under her deanship, the faculty instituted the "Scripps Humanities Program", similar programs were then adopted by larger institutions like Stanford and the University of Chicago. After six years Smith resigned from her position and took a year-long sabbatical (1935–1936) studying the History of Science at Columbia University and Harvard University, under Professor George Sarton. Upon her return, she continued teaching at Scripps and began teaching at Pomona College. Smith taught interdisciplinary courses such as the "Progress and Meaning in Science" to "The Natural History of Southern California." She also taught introductory geology courses, historical geology, and her specialty mineralogy. This continued until her retirement in 1954.

== Later life and death ==
After Bascom's death, Isabel F. Smith inherited her house and its contents. In 1976, Smith donated what is now known as the Florence Bascom Papers to the Sophia Smith Collection of Women's History. She then wrote a memoir to her teacher, The Stone Lady: A Memoir of Florence Bascom (1981):

The Stone Lady was written and published by Isabel Fothergill Smith after her retirement from academic work. It was written as a way to commemorate her mentor, Florence Bascom, and the lessons she learned because of her. She brings attention to the ways in which she learned about teaching and learning through lessons she received from Florence Bascom, specifically about learning to appreciate the process of research and learning, more than the actual results. Following the publishing of The Stone Lady: A Memoir of Florence Bascom, Smith went on to donate additional biographical materials.

Isabel F. Smith had never married and going well into her 99th year, died on September 16, 1990.

== Legacy ==
Scripps honored Smith's contributions by establishing a scholarship in her name (The Isabel Fothergill Smith Scholarship). The scholarship was established in 1979, and is awarded to female students who attend Scripps College; they must be mathematics or physical sciences students who are also committed to the humanities. The initial $100,000 amount was a result of an anonymous donor who was a former student of Smith's. It was created to “celebrate her profound influence on the development and progress of the College and on the lives of individual students.”

== Published works ==
- A columbite crystal from Boothwyn, Pennsylvania (1919)
- Anorthosite in the Piedmont province of Pennsylvania (1923)
- The Stone Lady: a Memoir of Florence Bascom (1981)
