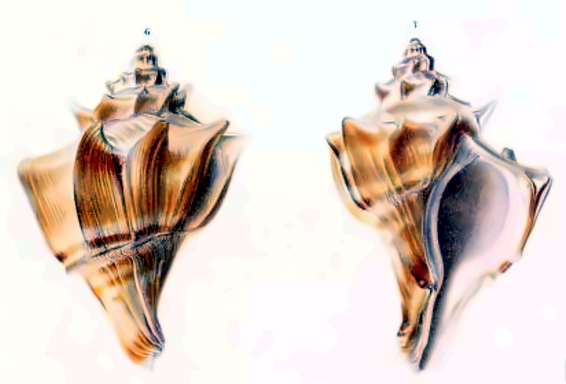
- image of a shell of Forreria belcheri

Scientific classification
- Kingdom: Animalia
- Phylum: Mollusca
- Class: Gastropoda
- Subclass: Caenogastropoda
- Order: Neogastropoda
- Family: Muricidae
- Genus: Forreria
- Species: F. belcheri

Binomial name
- Forreria belcheri (R.B. Hinds, 1843)

Synonyms
- Murex belcheri Hinds, 1843

= Forreria belcheri =

Species of gastropod

Forreria belcheri is a species of sea snail, a marine gastropod mollusc in the family Muricidae, the murex snails or rock snails.

== Description ==
The length of the shell varies between 64 mm and 187 mm.

== Distribution ==
Eastern Pacific Ocean: west coast of North America.

This marine species occurs off California, USA, to Central Baja California, Mexico.
