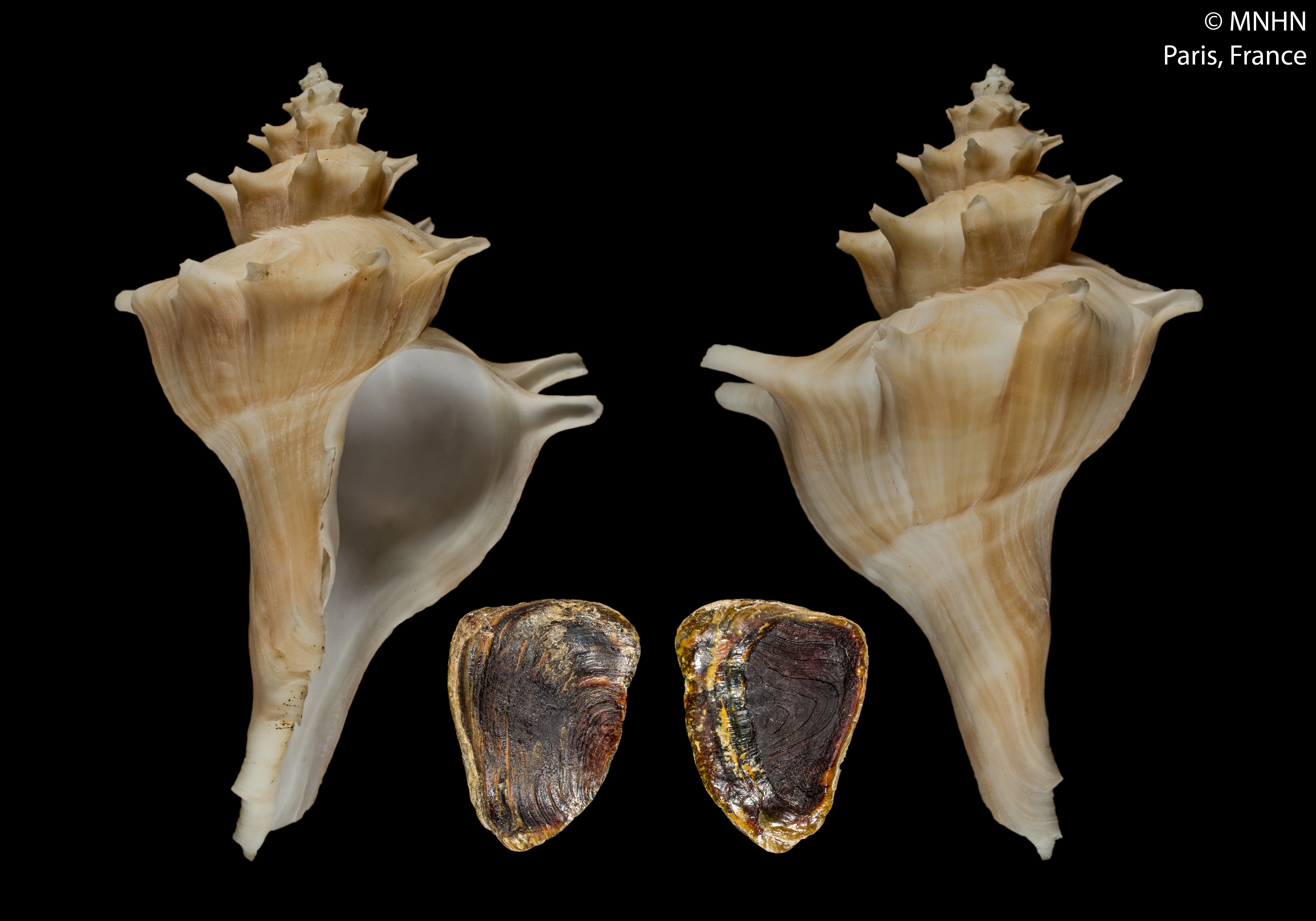
- Shell of Forreria corteziana (paratype at MNHN, Paris)

Scientific classification
- Kingdom: Animalia
- Phylum: Mollusca
- Class: Gastropoda
- Subclass: Caenogastropoda
- Order: Neogastropoda
- Superfamily: Muricoidea
- Family: Muricidae
- Subfamily: Ocenebrinae
- Genus: Forreria; Jousseaume, 1880

Type species
- Murex belcheri Hinds, 1844

= Forreria =

Genus of gastropods

Forreria is a genus of marine gastropod mollusks in the family Muricidae, the murex snails or rock snails.

The genus is indigenous to the Pacific coast of California. According to Petuch, they are the closest living relatives of the extinct ecphoras, a diverse lineage of murexes from what is now the North American Eastern Seaboard.

== Species ==
Species within the genus Forreria include:

- Forreria belcheri (Hinds, 1843)
- Forreria corteziana Berschauer, Petuch and Clark, 2018
