= 6084 Bascom =

Phocaea asteroid from the inner regions of the asteroid belt

Discovery
- Discovered by: C. S. Shoemaker; E. M. Shoemaker
- Discovery site: Palomar Obs.
- Discovery date: 12 February 1985

Designations
- Named after: Florence Bascom (American geologist)
- Alternative designations: 1985 CT · 1978 EC_{6} 1992 BM_{1}
- Minor planet category: main-belt · Phocaea

Orbital characteristics
- Epoch 4 September 2017 (JD 2458000.5)
- Uncertainty parameter 0
- Observation arc: 67.22 yr (24,553 days)
- Aphelion: 2.8582 AU
- Perihelion: 1.7697 AU
- Semi-major axis: 2.3139 AU
- Eccentricity: 0.2352
- Orbital period (sidereal): 3.52 yr (1,286 days)
- Mean anomaly: 163.37°
- Mean motion: 0° 16^{m} 48^{s} / day
- Inclination: 22.999°
- Longitude of ascending node: 147.24°
- Argument of perihelion: 258.81°
- Known satellites: 1 (P: 43.5 h; 0.37 D_{s}/D_{p}) (Note: Central Bureau for Astronomical Telegrams – CBET No. 389 Photometric observations obtained between 29 December 2005 and 2 February 2006, reveal, that 6084 Bascom is a binary system with an orbital period of 43.5 hours. The primary rotates with a period of 2.7454 hours. The lightcurve's amplitude is 0.22 magnitude. Mutual eclipse and occultation events between 0.12 and 0.18 magnitude, suggest a secondary-to-primary mean-diameter ratio of 0.37±0.02. The system's mean absolute R magnitude is 12.8±0.1. Reported by: David Higgins (Hunters Hill Obs., Canberra, Australia), Petr Pravec, Peter Kušnirák, and Lenka Šarounová (Ondřejov Obs., Czech Republic) and Štefan Gajdoš, Adrián Galád and Jozef Világi (Modra Obs., Slovakia))

Physical characteristics
- Dimensions: 6.17±1.15 km 6.347±0.218 km 6.388 km 6.39 km (taken)
- Synodic rotation period: 2.74516±0.00002 h 2.7454±0.0005 h 2.74542 h 2.74544±0.00002 h (Note: Pravec (2013) web: rotation period 2.74544±0.00002 hours with a brightness amplitude of 0.23 mag. Summary figures at Collaborative Asteroid Lightcurve Link and Ondrejov Asteroid Photometry Project)
- Geometric albedo: 0.2091; 0.220±0.030; 0.26±0.10
- Spectral type: S
- Absolute magnitude (H): 12.8±0.1 (R) · 12.80±0.03 (R) · 12.9 · 12.91±0.34 · 13.19 · 13.25 · 13.29±0.058

6084 Bascom, provisional designation 1985 CT, is a binary Phocaea asteroid from the inner regions of the asteroid belt, approximately 6.3 kilometers in diameter. It was discovered on 12 February 1985, by American astronomer couple Carolyn and Eugene Shoemaker at Palomar Observatory in California. It is named after American geologist Florence Bascom. Its satellite measures approximately 2.3 kilometers (0.37 D_{s}/D_{p}) and has an orbital period of 43.51 hours.

== Orbit and classification ==
Bascom is a stony S-type asteroid and member of the Phocaea family (701), a group of asteroids with similar orbital characteristics. It orbits the Sun in the inner main-belt at a distance of 1.8–2.9 AU once every 3 years and 6 months (1,286 days). Its orbit has an eccentricity of 0.24 and an inclination of 23° with respect to the ecliptic. A first precovery was taken at Palomar in 1950, extending the body's observation arc by 30 years prior to its official discovery observation.

== Diameter ==
According to the survey carried out by NASA's Wide-field Infrared Survey Explorer with its subsequent NEOWISE mission, Bascom measures 6.17 and 6.347 kilometers in diameter and its surface has an albedo of 0.22 and 0.26, respectively. The Collaborative Asteroid Lightcurve Link (CALL) adopts Petr Pravec's revised WISE-data, that is, an albedo of 0.2091 and a diameter of 6.39 kilometers for an absolute magnitude of 13.29.

== Moon and lightcurve ==
Between 29 December 2005 and 2 February 2006, the first ever rotational lightcurve was obtained from photometric observations taken by astronomers David Higgins at Hunters Hill Observatory, Australia, by Petr Pravec, Peter Kušnirák, and Lenka Šarounová at Ondřejov Observatory, Czech Republic, and by Štefan Gajdoš, Adrián Galád and Jozef Világi at Modra Observatory, Slovakia.

The observations revealed, that Bascom is a synchronous binary asteroid that has a moon orbiting its primary every 43.5 hours. Mutual asteroid occultation and eclipsing events with a magnitude between 0.12 and 0.18 suggest, that the satellite's diameter is 37±2% of that of Bascom (a secondary-to-primary diameter ratio of 0.37), which translates into a mean-diameter of 2.3 kilometers for the minor-planet moon. The photometric observations had an average absolute magnitude of 12.8.

Since Bascom's first observation in December 2005, astronomer Peter Pravec has obtained additional lightcurves. They gave a refined rotation period for the primary of 2.74516 to 2.74544 hours with a brightness variation between 0.14 and 0.23 magnitude (U=3/3/3). These observations also confirmed the presence of the satellite giving a concurring orbital period of 43.51 hours. For an asteroid of its size, Bascom has a relatively fast spin rate, but still above those of fast rotators. CALL adopts a rotation period of 2.74542 hours.

== Naming ==
This minor planet was named in memory of Florence Bascom (1862–1945), the second woman to earn her Ph.D. in geology in the United States. She was also the first woman hired by the United States Geological Survey and the first woman elected to the Council of the Geological Society of America. Bascom founded the geology department at Bryn Mawr College, Pennsylvania, where she taught the next generation of notable female geologists for 33 years. Expert in petrography, mineralogy and crystallography, her research focused on geomorphology. The approved naming citation was published by the Minor Planet Center on 11 April 1998 (M.P.C. 31610).
