= Geology of North Carolina =

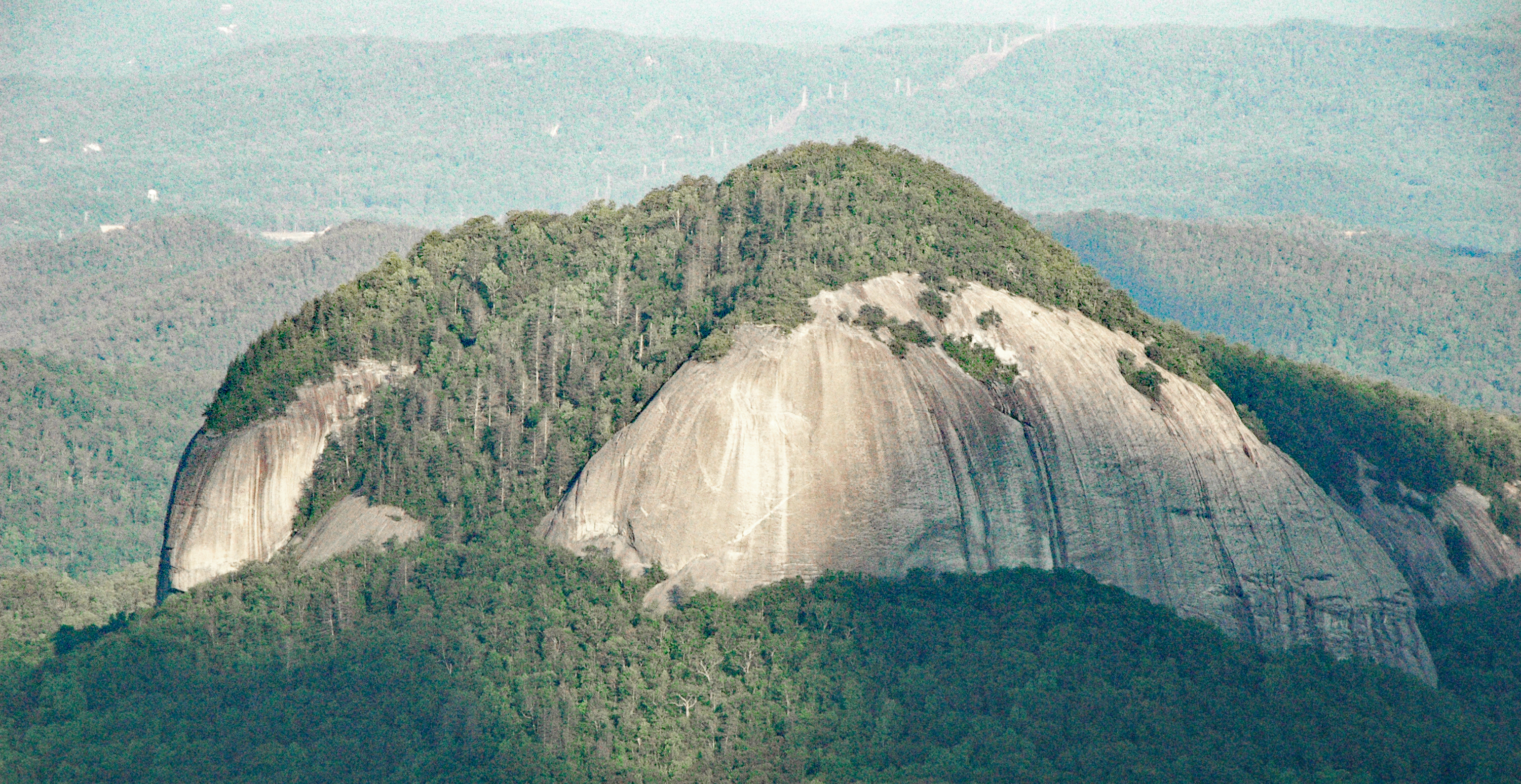
Looking Glass Dome

The geology of North Carolina includes ancient Proterozoic rocks belonging to the Grenville Province in the Blue Ridge. The region experienced igneous activity and the addition of new terranes and orogeny mountain building events throughout the Paleozoic, followed by the rifting of the Atlantic Ocean and the deposition of thick sediments in the Coastal Plain and offshore waters.

== Geologic history, stratigraphy and tectonics ==
The oldest rocks in North Carolina are part of the Grenville Province, which stretches from Texas to Labrador and which was impacted by the Grenville orogeny in the Mesoproterozoic to form the Appalachian Mountains. Grenville age rocks are exposed in the Blue Ridge province and the Sauratown Mountains. The Bakersville mafic dike swarm from 734 million years ago along with the peralkaline granites of the Crossnore Complex and bimodal volcanic rocks atop the crystalline basement point to the rifting of the proto-North American continent Laurentia.

=== Paleozoic (539-251 million years ago) ===
Neoproterozoic rifting formed the Iapetus Ocean and the Cambrian Unicoi Formation and Chillhowee Group, from the early Paleozoic show a transition from terrestrial sandstone to marine sedimentary rocks. Small volcanic island arcs and pieces of oceanic crust, collectively known as terranes, accreted onto the edge of Laurentia with the shifting of the Iapetus, Rheic and Theic ocean basins. Folding, thrusting and compression resulted in a series of different mountain building events.

The Taconic orogeny deformed and metamorphosed terranes in northwest North Carolina between 470 and 440 million years ago. The Salisbury and Concord Plutonic Suites formed 400 million years ago and may have been related to the Acadian orogeny in the Devonian.

South of the Brevard fault zone, granitoid plutons formed during the Alleghanian orogeny which was the final phase in the buildup of the Appalachians. The orogeny produced amphibolite grade rocks on the sequence of metamorphic facies in the Raleigh and Kiokee metamorphic belts in the eastern Piedmont as well as near High Shoals Granite, introduced strike-slip faulting from the Brevard fault southeast to the Piedmont fault zone and produced the thrust sheets of the Blue Ridge and Piedmont.

=== Mesozoic (251-66 million years ago) ===
In the Mesozoic, rifting in the Triassic began to break apart the supercontinent Pangea which had assembled during the Alleghanian orogeny. Thinning of the crust produced diabase dikes in the early Jurassic 200 million years ago throughout the Piedmont, as well as felsic dikes and diabase sills in the Deep River Basin. Seismic data indicates that large basalt flows found offshore extend onshore, reaching Charleston, South Carolina. Few Cretaceous and Jurassic rocks are rare on the continental margin.

More deeply buried crystalline basement rock that remains poorly understood underlies eastern North Carolina, although the present geology of the area at the surface is dominated entirely by the Atlantic coastal plain, which resulted from sediment eroded off the Appalachian Mountains that began to steadily form in the Cretaceous.

=== Cenozoic (66 million years ago-present) ===
The Atlantic coastal plain continued to build out to sea during the Cenozoic and the current sand, clay and gravel at surface on dry land and in rivers, lakes, and nearshore water all formed during the last 2.5 million years of the Quaternary. The Waccamaw Formation includes fossil bearing sands and formed between the Pliocene and the Pleistocene, in the southeasternmost part of North Carolina, south of Wilmington. The Comfort Member and New Hanover Member formed earlier and include bryozoan and echinoid fossils, skeletal limestone and phosphate pebble conglomerate. The smaller Riverbend Formation lies just to the east, running north and south from Jackson with a limestone unit and abuts the oyster shell mounds and clay sands of the Pollocksville Member.

Rising up to 25 feet above sea level atop the Suffolk Scarp, Quaternary sediments comprise the Outer Banks and both the peninsulas and bottom of the water in and around Pamlico Sound and Albemarle Sound.
