= Stissing Mountain =

Mountain in New York, United States

- Location within New York Location within the United States

Highest point
- Elevation: 1,388 feet (423 m)
- Coordinates: 41°57′23″N 73°41′33″W

Geography
- Location: SW of Pine Plains, Dutchess County, New York, U.S.
- Topo map: USGS Pine Plains

Stissing Mountain, with an elevation of 1,403 feet (428 meters), lies in northern Dutchess County, New York, where it rises about 1,000 feet (305 meters) above its local footings. The mountain is steepest on its eastern slopes, which average 40 percent (or 21.8 degrees). This eastern escarpment is about 3 miles (4.8 km) long. Around Stissing's eastern base are substantial amounts of talus blocks composed of gneiss. A restored, 1933 fire tower is near the summit and open to the public (as of 2023) via hiking trails.

== Geology ==
Stissing is primarily gneiss but shale, limestone, and quartzite are found in the immediate area. This gneiss was originally raised along with softer sedimentary rocks via thrust faulting. Erosion wore away the softer materials, 'leaving the hard core of Stissing."Ordovician thrust faulting pushed Stissing's gneiss "core" to its current position on top of younger rock strata. This unusual age sequence of strata is "also common elsewhere in the Taconic section." Although geologically related to the Taconic Mountains, Stissing as a matter of cultural geography is neither part of the Taconics nor the greater Hudson Highlands, both of which are nearby.

== History ==
In late 1933, the Boston Corners CCC Camp built a 79-foot-6-inch-tall (24.23 m) International Derrick E-4898 steel fire lookout tower on the mountain. The tower had been provided to the State by the United States Forest Service. The tower was first staffed in 1935, reporting 91 fires and 610 visitors. The tower ceased fire lookout operations sometime between 1979 and 1982. The tower was later restored by the Friends of Stissing Landmarks and is open to the public.
