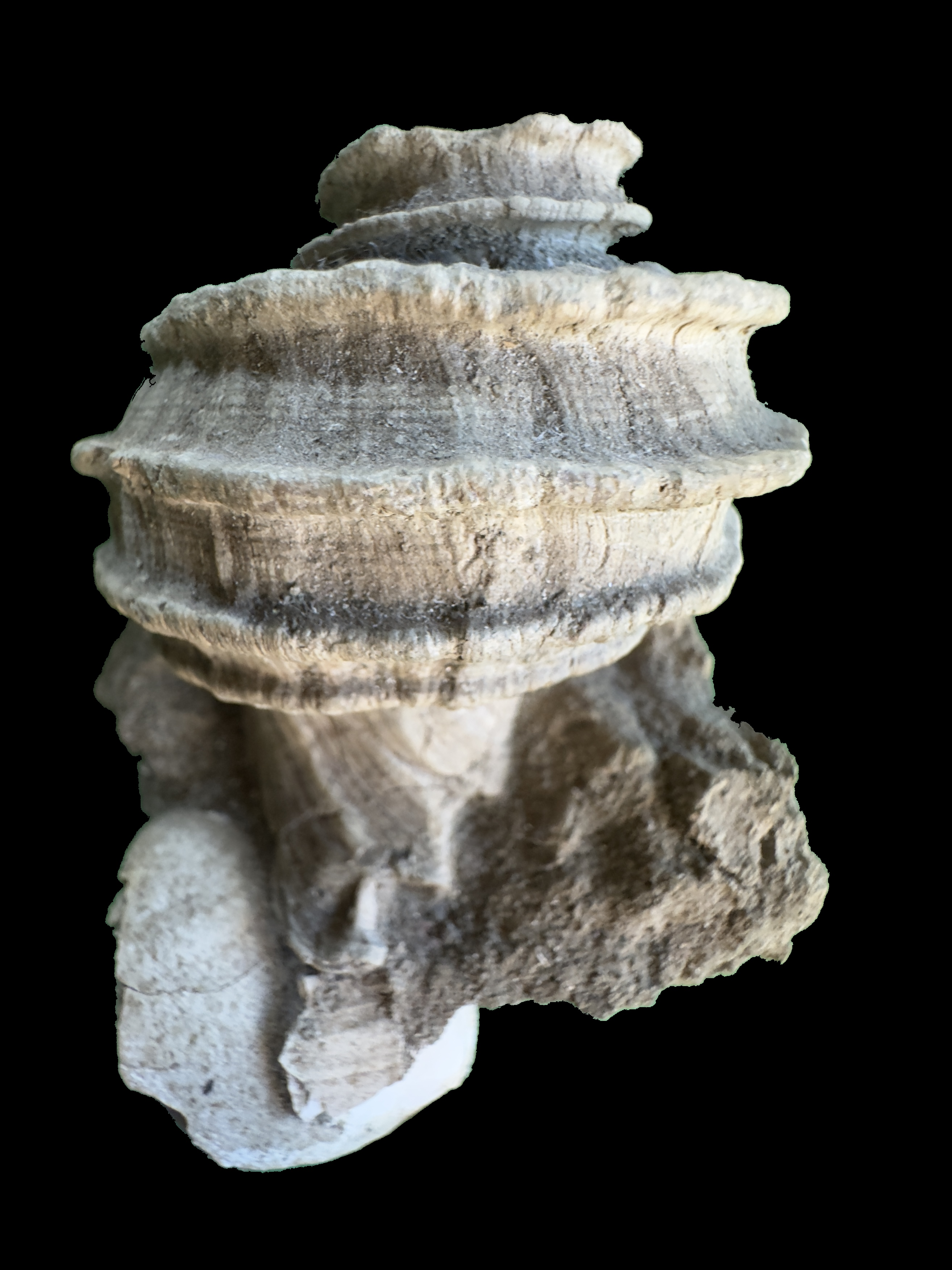
- A specimen of Ecphora gardnerae from the Miocene of Maryland

Scientific classification
- Kingdom: Animalia
- Phylum: Mollusca
- Class: Gastropoda
- Subclass: Caenogastropoda
- Order: Neogastropoda
- Family: Muricidae
- Genus: †Ecphora
- Species: †E. gardnerae

Binomial name
- †Ecphora gardnerae Wilson, 1987

= Ecphora gardnerae =

Ecphora gardnerae Temporal range: Miocene

Species of gastropod

Ecphora gardnerae is a species of extinct predatory ocenebrinid murex gastropod. Shells of E. gardnerae are found in Miocene-aged marine strata of Maryland and Virginia.

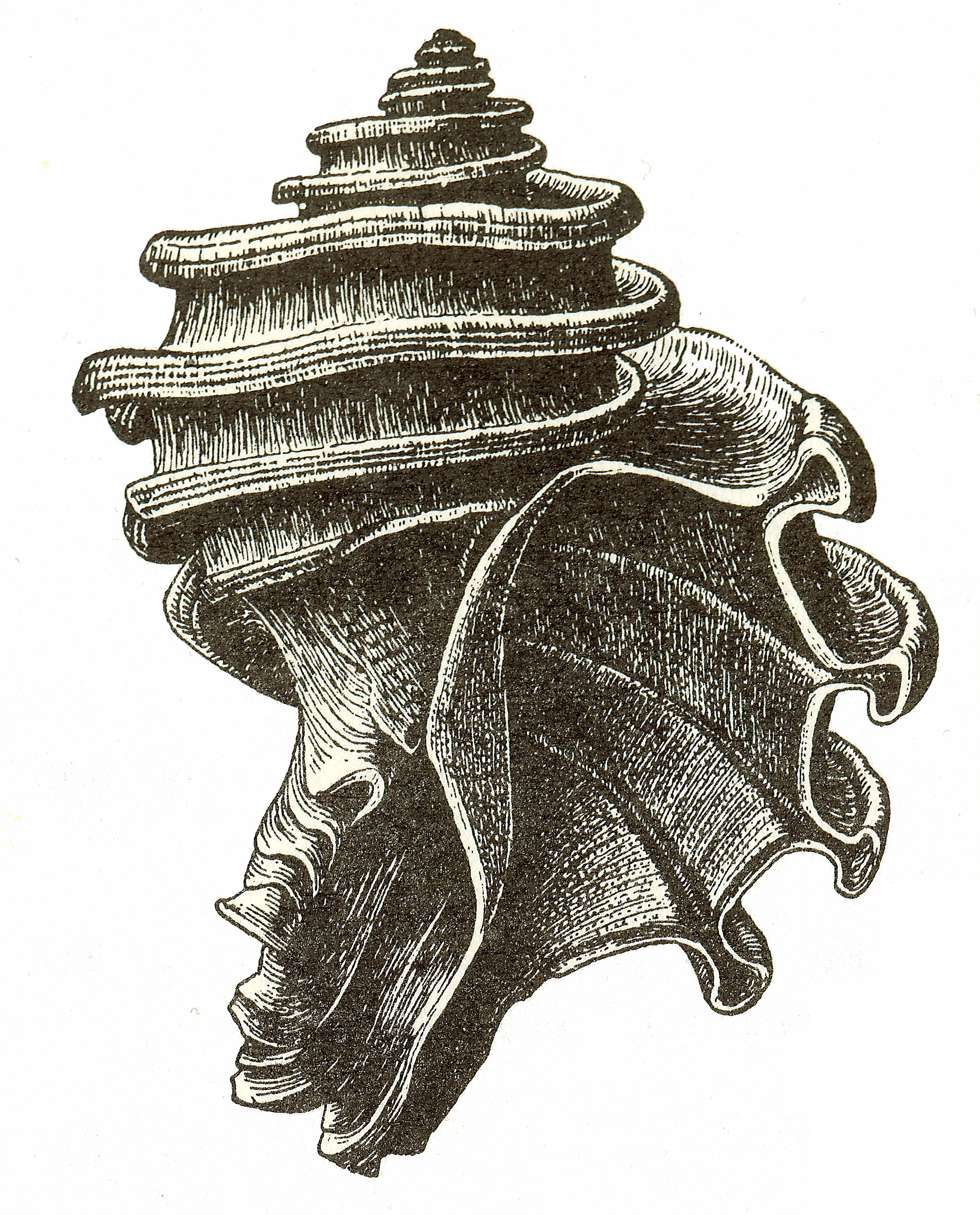
An apertural view of a shell of Ecphora gardnerae gardnerae, drawn by J. C. McConnell

== Subspecies ==
Subspecies include:

- Ecphora gardnerae gardnerae, the nominate subspecies
- Ecphora gardnerae germonae

== Geological history ==
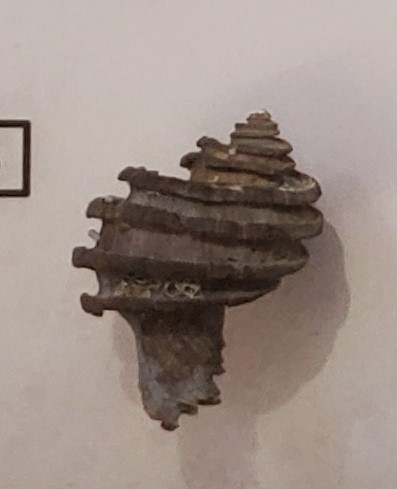
Ecphora gardnerae fossil

This species of large carnivorous sea snail lived during the Miocene epoch, and became extinct more than five million years ago.

This species was previously known as Ecphora quadricostata, but that name is now restricted to a species which is found from Pliocene strata in Virginia to Florida. The Miocene-aged specimens found in Maryland have been assigned to a different taxon, Ecphora gardnerae.

== Life habits ==
As with most other muricids, Ecphora sea snails bored holes through the hard shells of other mollusks, usually bivalves, or sometimes other snails, including other, smaller Ecphoras, in order to feed on their soft insides using a toothed, ribbonlike appendage (common to almost all gastropods) known as a radula.

== Commemoration of the fossil ==
In March 1994, Dr. Eric Seifter testified before the Maryland Legislature that the classification of the Maryland State Fossil, Ecphora quadricostata was invalid (quadricostata is not actually found in Maryland) and needed to be changed to Ecphora gardnerae gardnerae. The fossil was named for geologist Julia Anna Gardner.
