= J. C. McConnell =

American paleontologist

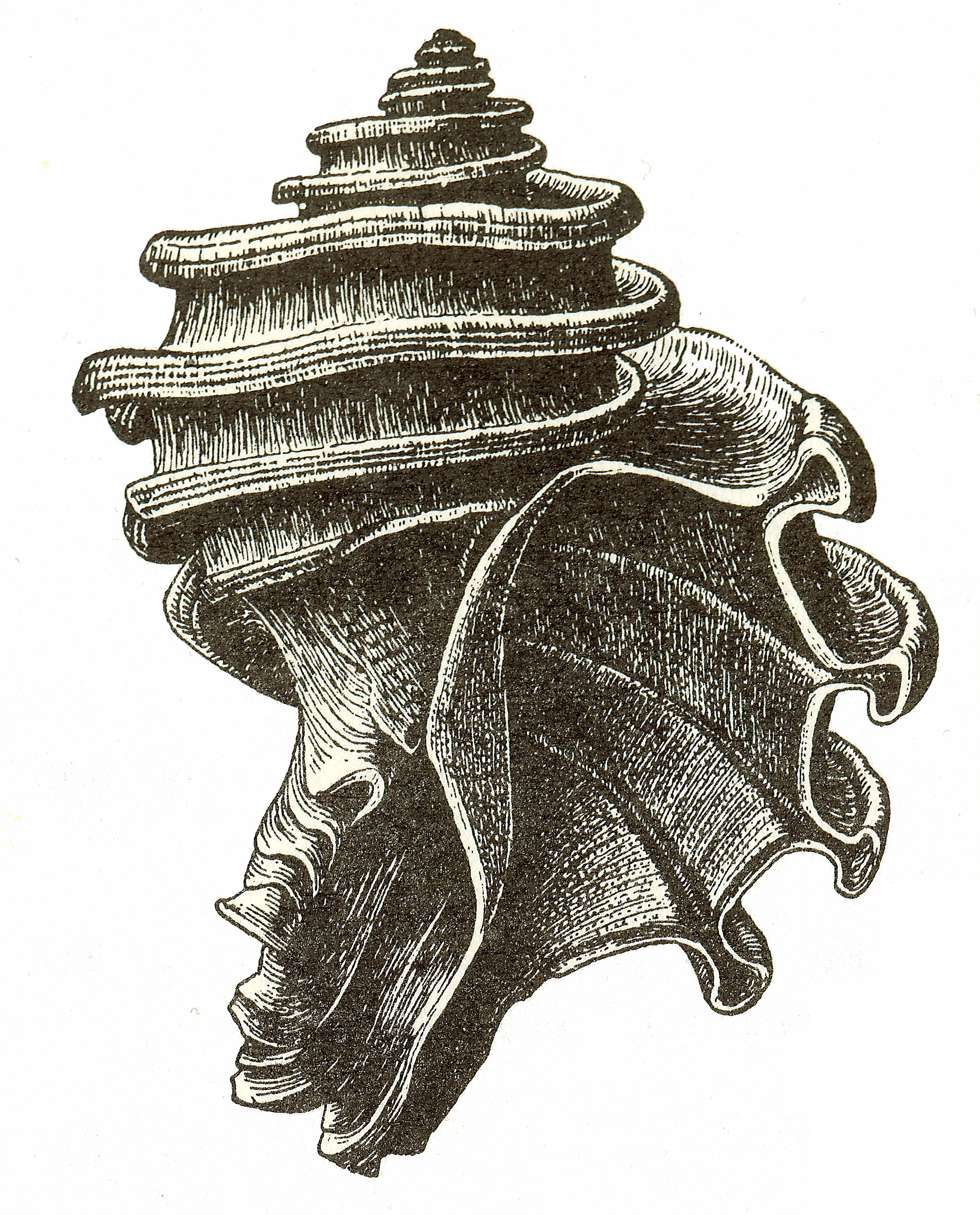
Ecphora gardnerae gardnerae drawn by McConnell, 1904

James Culbertson McConnell, usually abbreviated as J. C. McConnell (born 1844 – died July 25, 1904, Liberty, New York) was one of the world's most acclaimed scientific illustrators.

McConnell was an anatomist with the Army Medical Museum in Washington, D.C. For thirty-five years, he drew "many thousand exquisite drawings" of fossils, shells and bones for scientific publications. In an obituary, it was stated that, "as a draughtsman, in black and white line for scientific purposes, he had no equal in this country, if in the world."

He is most well known for his "incomparable pictures of shells" and illustrated a number of publications by the famous malacologist William Healey Dall. McConnell also illustrated fossils described by Charles Doolittle Walcott.

McConnell's illustrations continued to be used long after his death. For example, most of the black and white illustrations in R. Tucker Abbott's American Seashells (1954) were by McConnell.

McConnell has been described as "one of those shadowy-figured artisans about whom little is known." Although he held a medical degree and used the title "doctor", "officially he was a clerk."

== Gallery ==
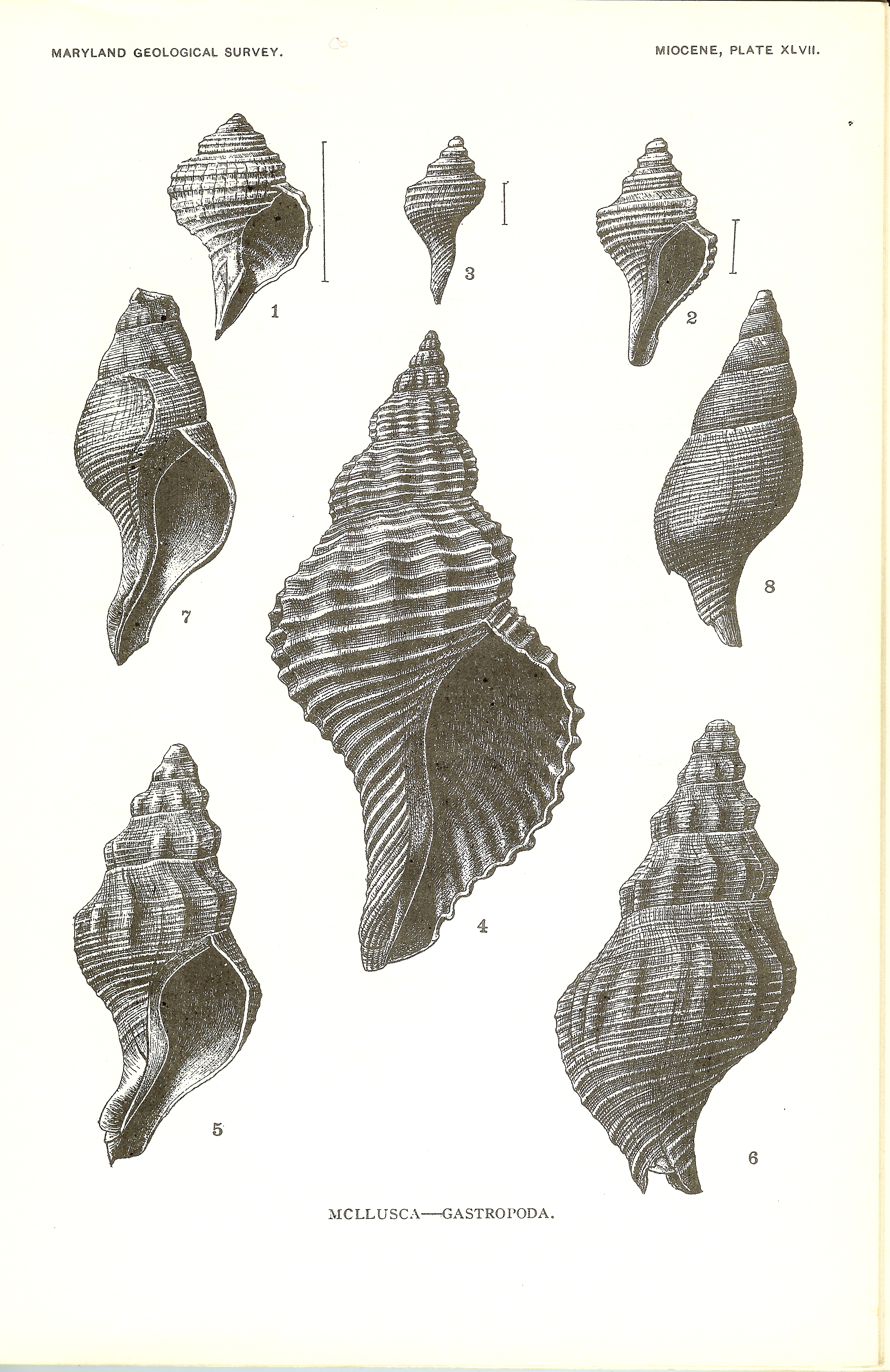
Miocene gastropods from Maryland, 1904

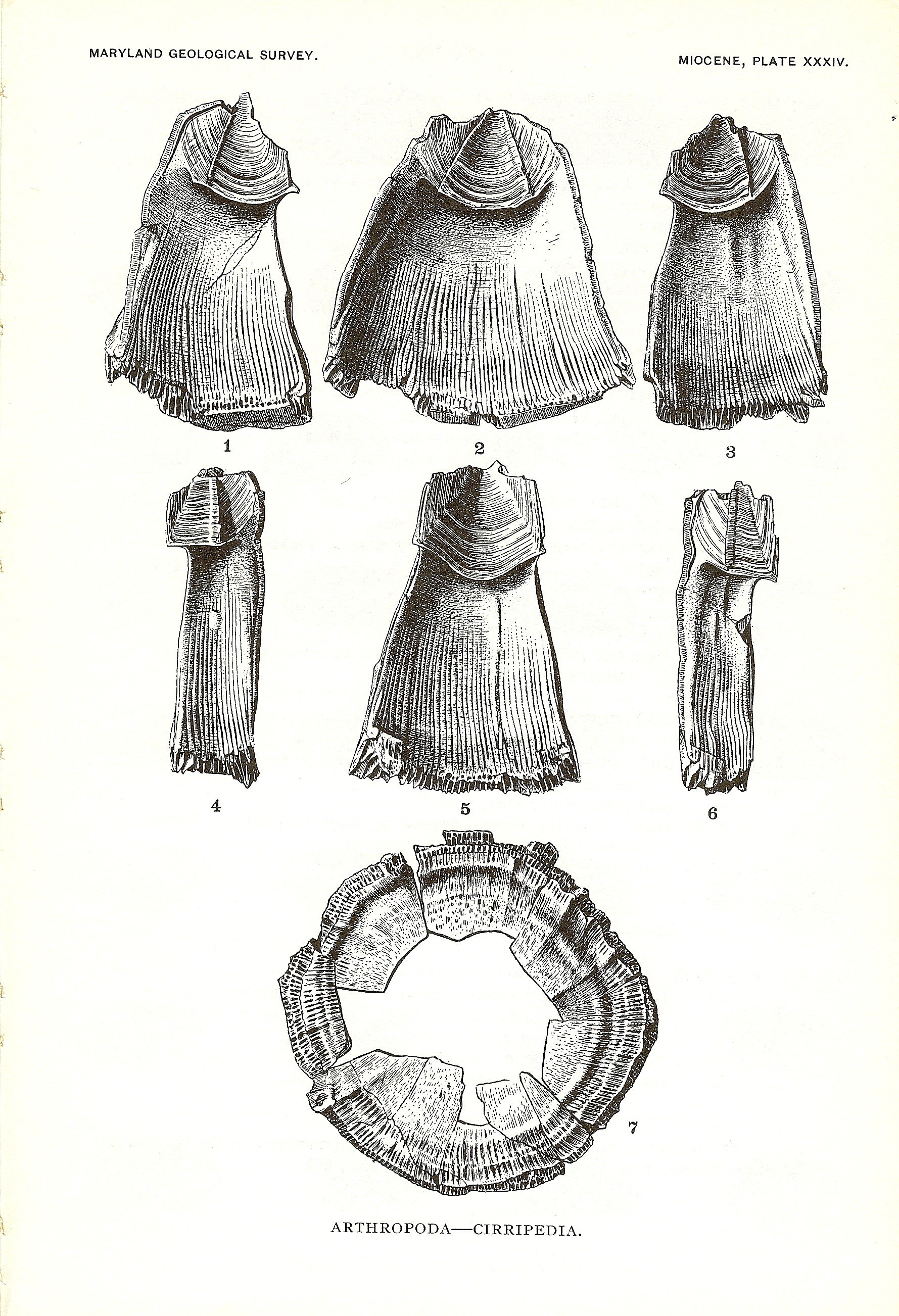
Miocene barnacle, Balanus concavus from Maryland, 1904

== Bibliography ==
McConnell's illustrations appear in (partial list):

- 1880. Indiana Dept of Statistics and Geology, Second Annual report of the Department of Statistics and Geology, Indianapolis.
- J. C. McConnell & George M. Wheeler. 1875-1889 (the Carboniferous section published in 1881) Carboniferous (invertebrate fossils of New Mexico) In: Report upon United States Geographical Surveys West of the One Hundredth Meridian, GPO, Washington.
- Charles A. White 1884. A review of the fossil ostreidæ of North America. Washington, GPO.
- Maryland Geological Survey 1901. Eocene. Baltimore.
- William Healey Dall 1903. Contributions to the Tertiary Fauna of Florida. Philadelphia.
- 1904. Maryland Geological Survey, Miocene, Baltimore, (published posthumously).
