= Planecphora =

Planecphora Temporal range: Serravallian–Piacenzian

Scientific classification
- Kingdom: Animalia
- Phylum: Mollusca
- Class: Gastropoda
- Subclass: Caenogastropoda
- Order: Neogastropoda
- Family: Muricidae
- Subfamily: Ocenebrinae
- Genus: †Planecphora; Petuch, 2003

Type species
- Ecphora choptankensis Petuch, 1988

Diversity
- 6 species

Synonyms
- Ecphora (Planecphora)

Extinct genus of snails

Planecphora is a genus of extinct carnivorous snails related to Ecphora. This group went extinct with the disappearance of the Tamiami Subsea.

== Species ==
- Planecphora choptankensis (Petuch, 1988) (nominate species) Miocene Maryland and Virginia
- Planecphora delicata (Petuch, 1988) Miocene Maryland and Virginia
- Planecphora hertweckorum (Petuch, 1987) Pliocene Florida
- Planecphora mansfieldi (Petuch, 1989) Pliocene Florida
- Planecphora turneri (Petuch, 1992)
- Planecphora vokesi (Petuch, 1988) Miocene Maryland and Virginia
