= Julia Anna Gardner =

American geologist

Julia Gardner
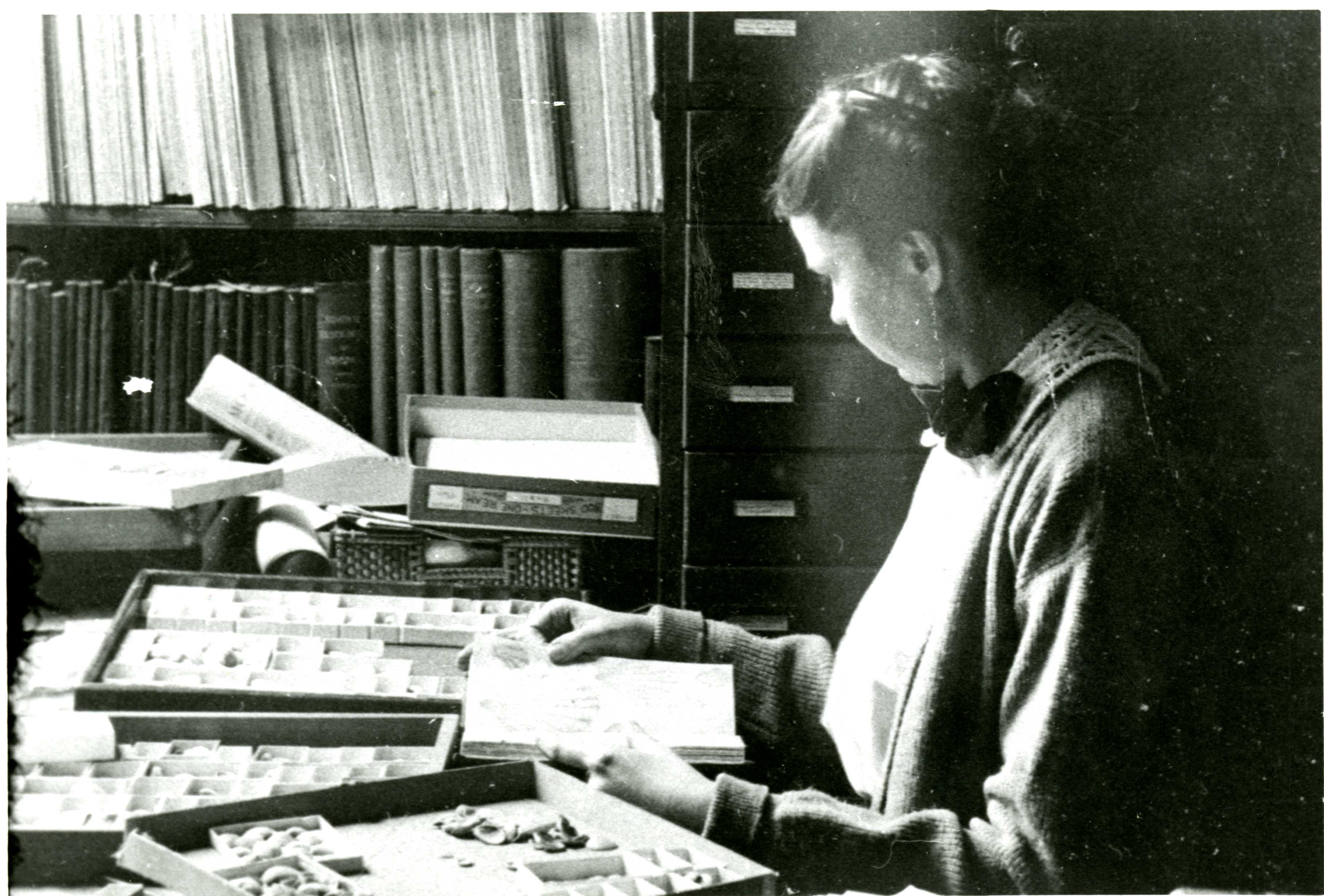
- Born: January 6, 1882; Chamberlain, South Dakota
- Died: November 15, 1960 (aged 78)
- Education: Bryn Mawr College (AB, MA); Johns Hopkins University (PhD)
- Known for: Study of stratigraphy and ancient molluscs
- Scientific career
- Fields: Paleontology, Geology
- Workplaces: United States Geological Survey

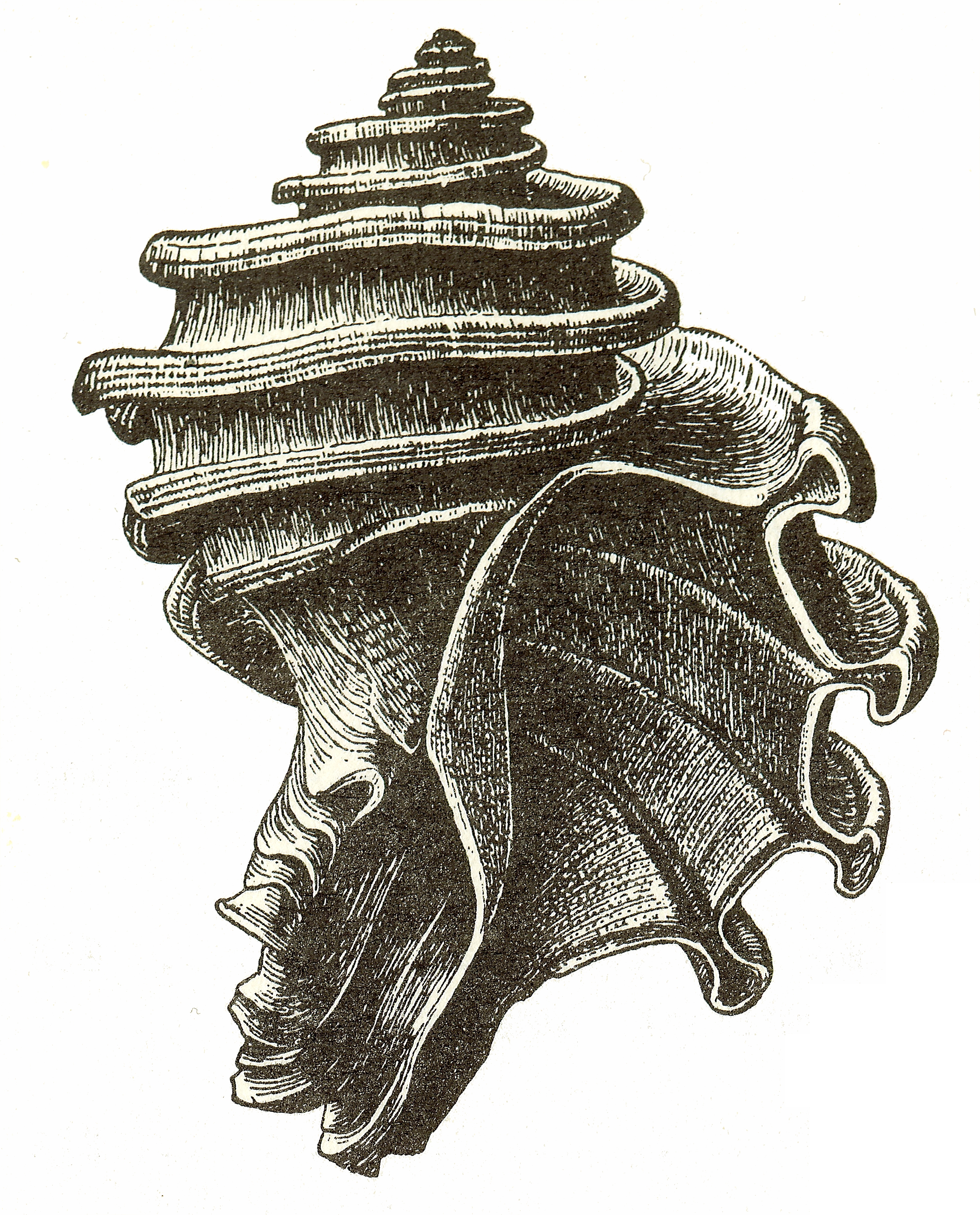
Ecphora gardnerae was named after Julia Anna Gardner and is the official fossil shell of the state of Maryland.

Julia Anna Gardner (January 26, 1882 – November 15, 1960) was an American geologist who worked for the United States Geological Survey for 32 years. She was known worldwide for her work in stratigraphy and mollusc paleontology.

== Early life and education ==
Gardner was born in Chamberlain, South Dakota, the only child of Charles Henry and Julia (Brackett) Gardner. She was raised in South Dakota but completed high school in North Adams, Massachusetts. At the very young age of 4 months, Julia's father died. Julia and her mother moved back to Dixon (the home of Julia's mother) in 1895, and then by 1898, they moved to North Adams, Mass; here, Julia completed her high school education at Drury Academy, paying for it with money left to her by her grandmother.

She earned a Bachelor of Arts in 1905 and a Master's degree in 1907 from Bryn Mawr College, studying paleontology and geology.

Gardner was the first woman admitted as a full-fledged student to the Department of Geology at Johns Hopkins University, where she earned her Ph.D. in paleontology in 1911. She continued work as an assistant in paleontology at the university. The Maryland Geological Survey published her studies of the Late Cretaceous Mollusca of Maryland in 1916.

== Professional life ==
During World War I she served as an auxiliary nurse in France and worked with the American Friends Service Committee in devastated areas of France after the war, returning to the United States in 1920. She then joined the United States Geological Survey, spending most of her career studying the Tertiary beds in the coastal plain, including areas from Maryland south into Mexico. Her work in Texas in the 1920s included consultation with petroleum company geologists and identification of seventy new species of Texas fossils. She did extensive research of Gulf Coast fauna, including in Mexico during the 1930s and 1940s.

Gardner served as a United States delegate to the 1926 International Geological Congress in Madrid, Spain and to the 1937 Congress in Moscow. During World War II, as a member of the Military Geology Unit, she became the leader of a group known as "The Dungeon Gang". Within this group she helped to prepare plans for the armed forces, organized texts, shared ideas, and created maps. Gardner was an incredibly hard worker and because of this she was well respected by all who worked with her. Over the course of the war, she helped find the Japanese beaches where the incendiary balloon bombs were being launched, by identifying shell fragments in the sand-filled ballast of the balloons. After the war she toured Japan, encouraging Japanese scientists to continue their work. Gardner not only encouraged scientists, she also encouraged artists, for she showed interest in Art. Her versatility lead her to being a charter member of the Arts club in Washington.

Gardner authored over 40 reports that were used as standards of reference regarding Tertiary strata in North and South America. These include "The Midway Group of Texas" (Texas University Bulletin 3301, 1935); "Mollusca of the Tertiary Formations of Northeastern Mexico" (Geological Society of America, 1947); and "The molluscan fauna of the Alum Bluff group of Florida" (U.S. Geological Survey paper 142, 1926-1947).

Gardner wrote papers that were primarily taxonomic, strategraphic or paleoecologic. Her published papers dealt mostly with coastal plain geology. Julia took part in fieldwork all over the world, including rougher locations such as those throughout Mexico. She spent weeks visiting and spending time in places that other geographers may not have dared visit. Her report on the "Mollusca from the Miocene and Lower Pliocene of Virginia and North Carolina" (Professional Paper 199-A), published in 1943, built partially on the work of Dr. W. C. Mansfield, and included work Gardner had started up to 30 years earlier. This report included systemic descriptions of over 40 families of Mollusca, representing 24 superfamilies and four separate orders.

In the year 1960 at the age of 78, Gardner died at her home in Maryland.

== Awards and honors ==
Gardner was a member of the Phi Beta Kappa and Sigma Xi societies, as well as the Geological Society of America, the American Association of Petroleum Geologists, and the Paleontological Society. She was named a Fellow of the American Association for the Advancement of Science in 1925. She served as president of the Paleontological Society in 1952 and vice presidency of the Geological Society of America in 1953. When she retired from the United States Geological Survey, she received the Distinguished Service Medal. Hundreds of people wrote Julia letters expressing their affection for her. The letters were bound into two volumes, which were presented to her by her Branch Chief, Preston Cloud when she entered retirement. She was recognized not only for her geological contributions but also for her great friendship. After her death the society published a memorial book.

Ecphora gardnerae, an extinct snail shell was named after Julia Anna Gardner. In 1994 the state of Maryland designated it the official state fossil shell of Maryland. Specimens of ecphora are found along the Calvert Cliffs in Calvert County and St. Mary's County, Maryland.
