= List of the prehistoric life of South Carolina =

The Paleobiology Database records no known ocences of Precambrian fossils in Alabama.

== Paleozoic ==
- †Agraulos
- †Hypagnostus
  - †Hypagnostus mammillatus
- †Paradoxides
  - †Parcus – or unidentified comparable form
- †Peronopsis
  - †Peronopsis fallax
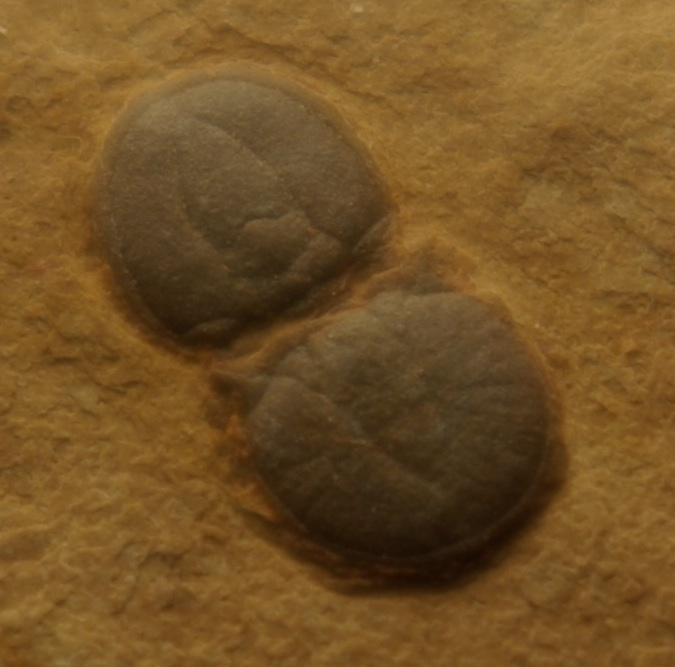
- Fossil of the Cambrian trilobite Ptychagnostus
  †Ptychagnostus
  - †Ptychagnostus fissus
- †Skreiaspis

== Mesozoic ==
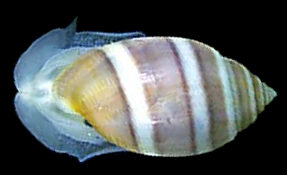
- A living Acteon barrel bubble sea snail
  †Acteon
- †Acutostrea
  - †Acutostrea plumosa
- †Aenona
  - †Aenona eufaulensis
- †Amaurellina
  - †Amaurellina stephensoni
- †Ambigostrea
  - †Ambigostrea sloani
  - †Ambigostrea tecticosta
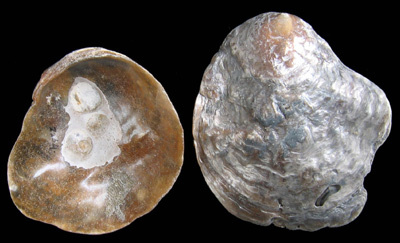
- Interior and exterior of a shell of an Anomia, or jingle shell
  †Anomia
  - †Anomia argentaria
  - †Anomia ornata
- †Anomoeodus
  - †Anomoeodus phaseolus
- †Aphrodina
  - †Aphrodina tippana
- †Arca
- †Archaeolamna
  - †Archaeolamna kopingensis
- Ataphrus
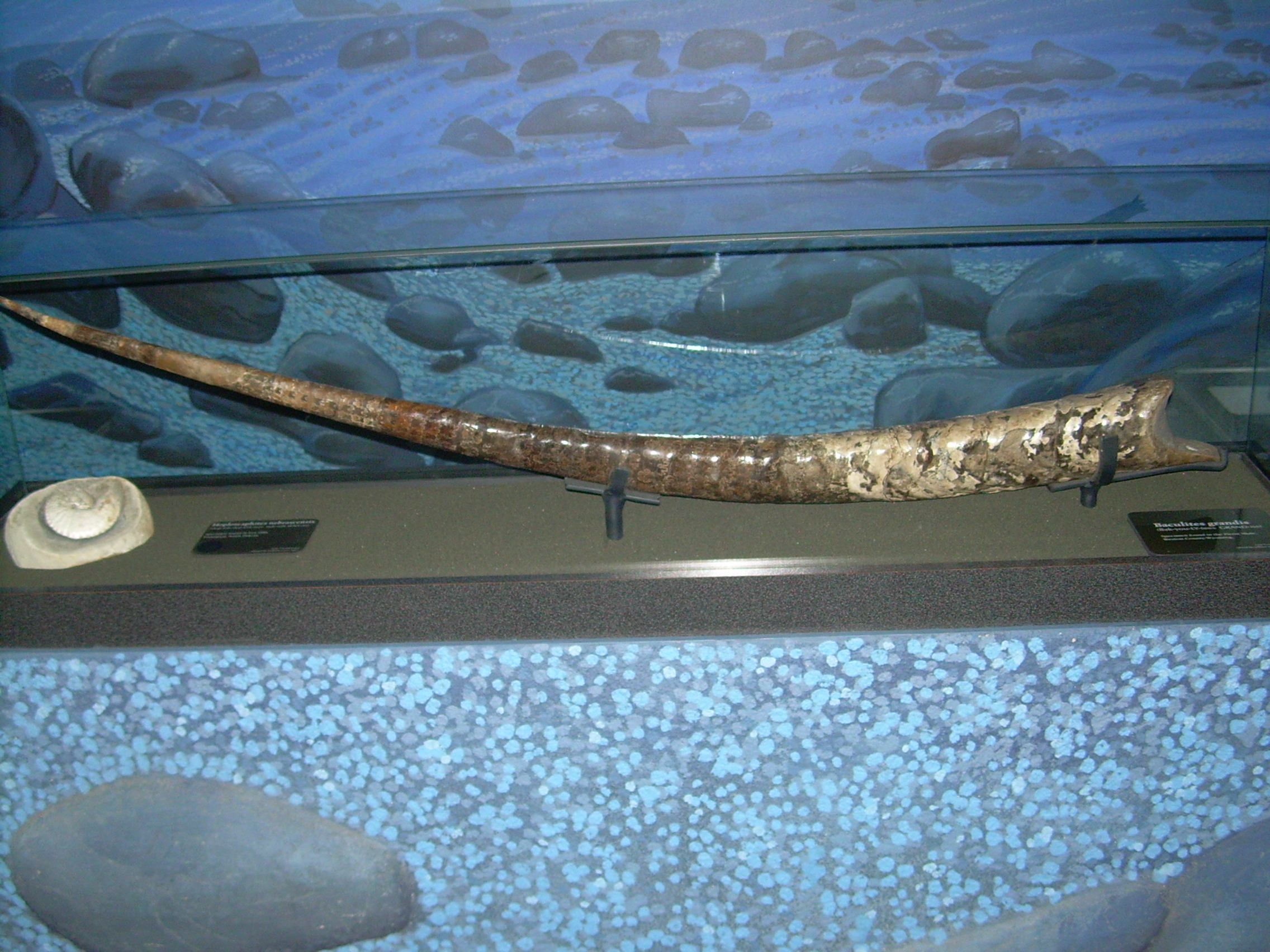
- Fossilized shell of the Late Cretaceous ammonoid cephalopod Baculites
  †Baculites
- †Bellifusus
  - †Bellifusus crassicostatus
  - †Bellifusus curvicostatus
- †Borodinopristis
  - †Borodinopristis schwimmeri
- Botula
  - †Botula carolinensis
- †Brachyrhizodus
  - †Brachyrhizodus wichitaensis
- Caestocorbula
  - †Caestocorbula crassaplica
  - †Caestocorbula crassiplica
  - †Caestocorbula terramaria
- †Calliomphalus
  - †Calliomphalus americanus
  - †Calliomphalus nudus
- Calyptraea
- †Camptonectes
  - †Camptonectes argillensis
  - †Camptonectes bubonis
- †Cantioscyllium
  - †Cantioscyllium meyeri
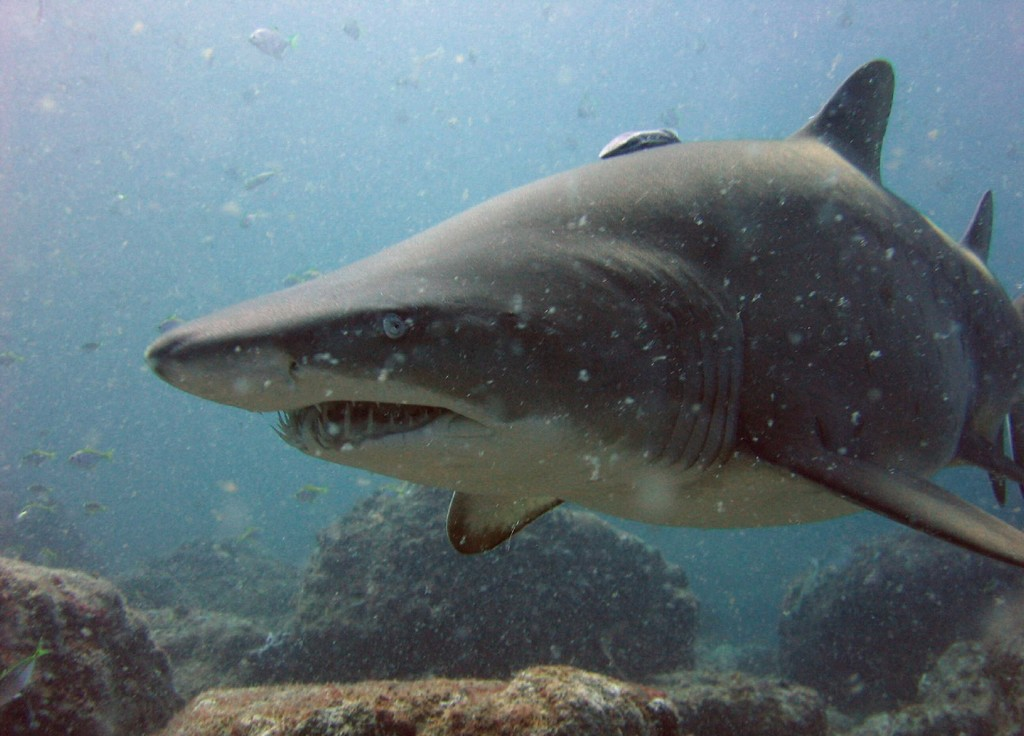
- A living Carcharias sand tiger shark
  Carcharias
  - †Carcharias holmdelensis
  - †Carcharias samhammeri
- Chiloscyllium
- Cliona
- †Clisocolus
  - †Clisocolus concentricum
- Corbula
- Crassatella
  - †Crassatella carolinana
  - †Crassatella vadosa
- †Crenella
  - †Crenella elegantula
  - †Crenella serica
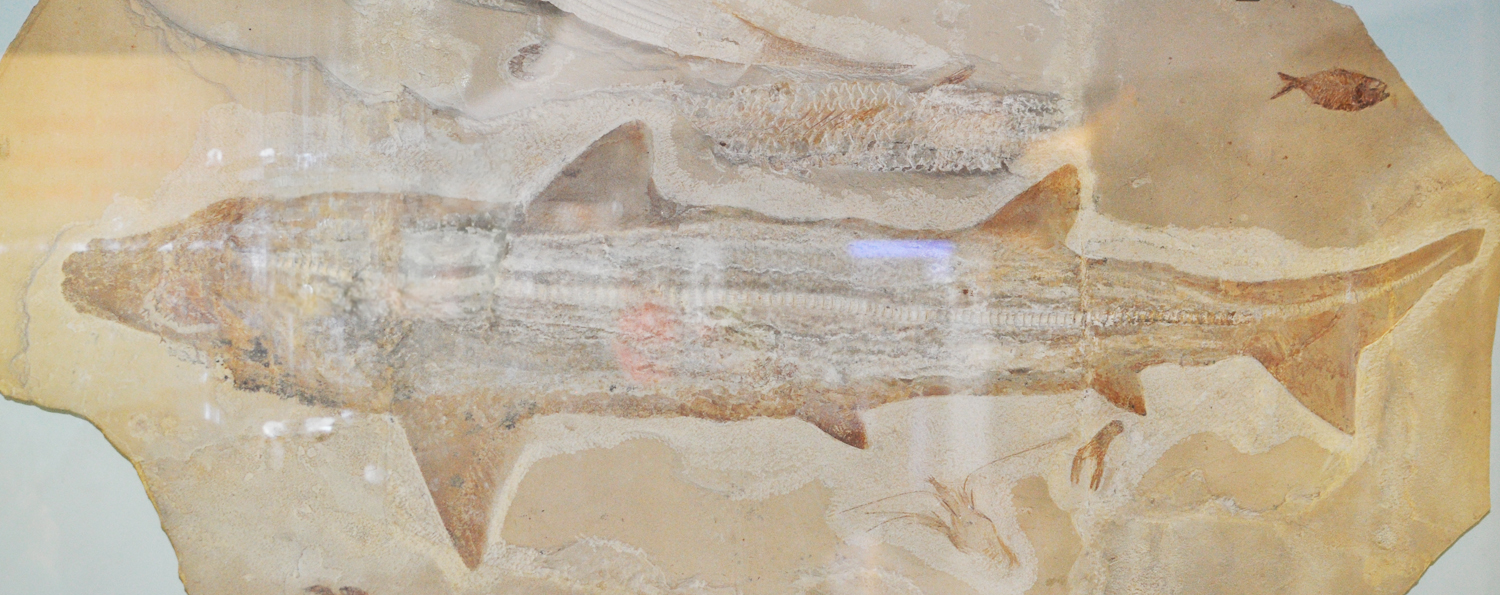
- Fossil of the Early Cretaceous-Eocene shark Cretolamna
  †Cretalamna
  - †Cretalamna appendiculata
- †Cretodus
  - †Cretodus borodini
- Cucullaea
  - †Cucullaea capax
  - †Cucullaea littlei
  - †Cucullaea powersi
- †Cuna
  - †Cuna texana
- †Cuspidaria
  - †Cuspidaria ampulla
- †Cyclorisma
  - †Cyclorisma parva
- Cylichna
- †Cymbophora
  - †Cymbophora appressa
  - †Cymbophora berryi
  - †Cymbophora trigonalis
- †Cyprimeria
  - †Cyprimeria alta
  - †Cyprimeria depressa
  - †Cyprimeria major
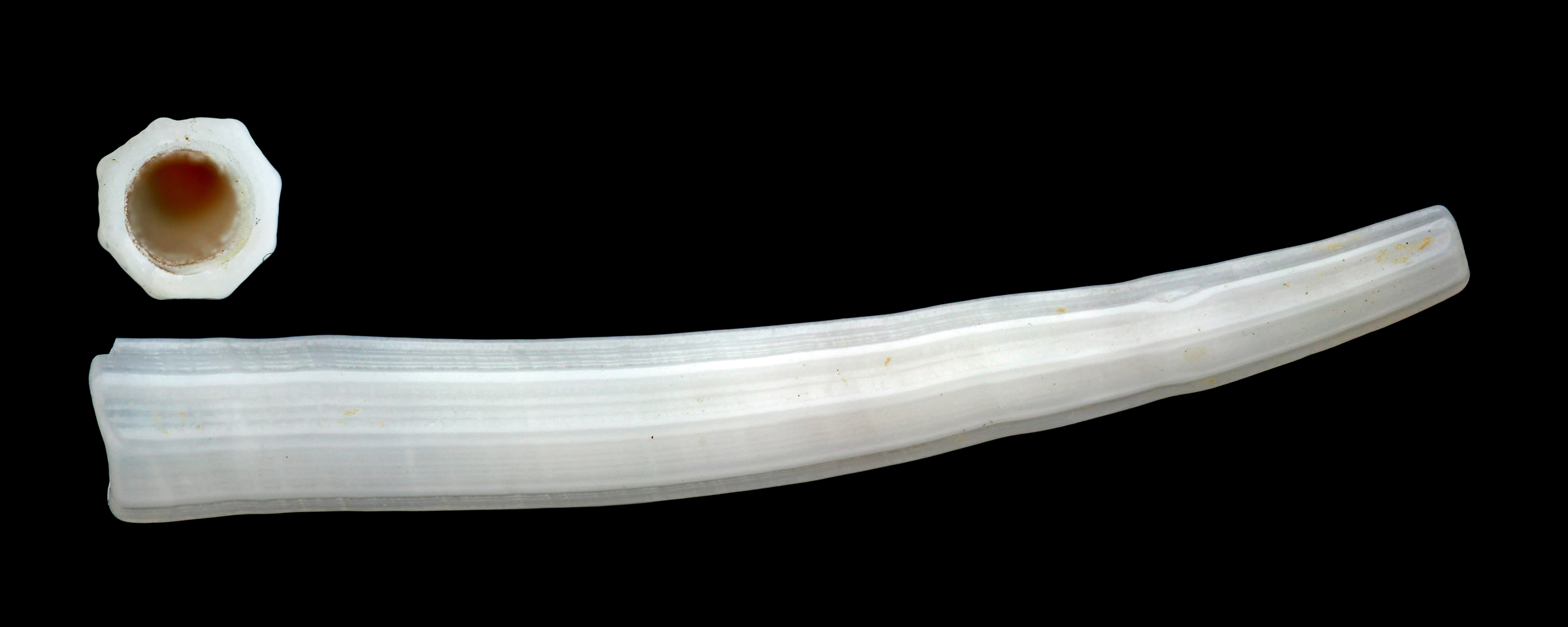
- Shell of a Dentalium tusk shell
  †Dentalium
  - †Dentalium leve
  - †Dentalium navarroi
- †Deussenia
  - †Deussenia bellalirata
- †Dhondtichlamys
  - †Dhondtichlamys venustus
- †Drilluta
  - †Drilluta buboanus
- †Ellipsoscapha
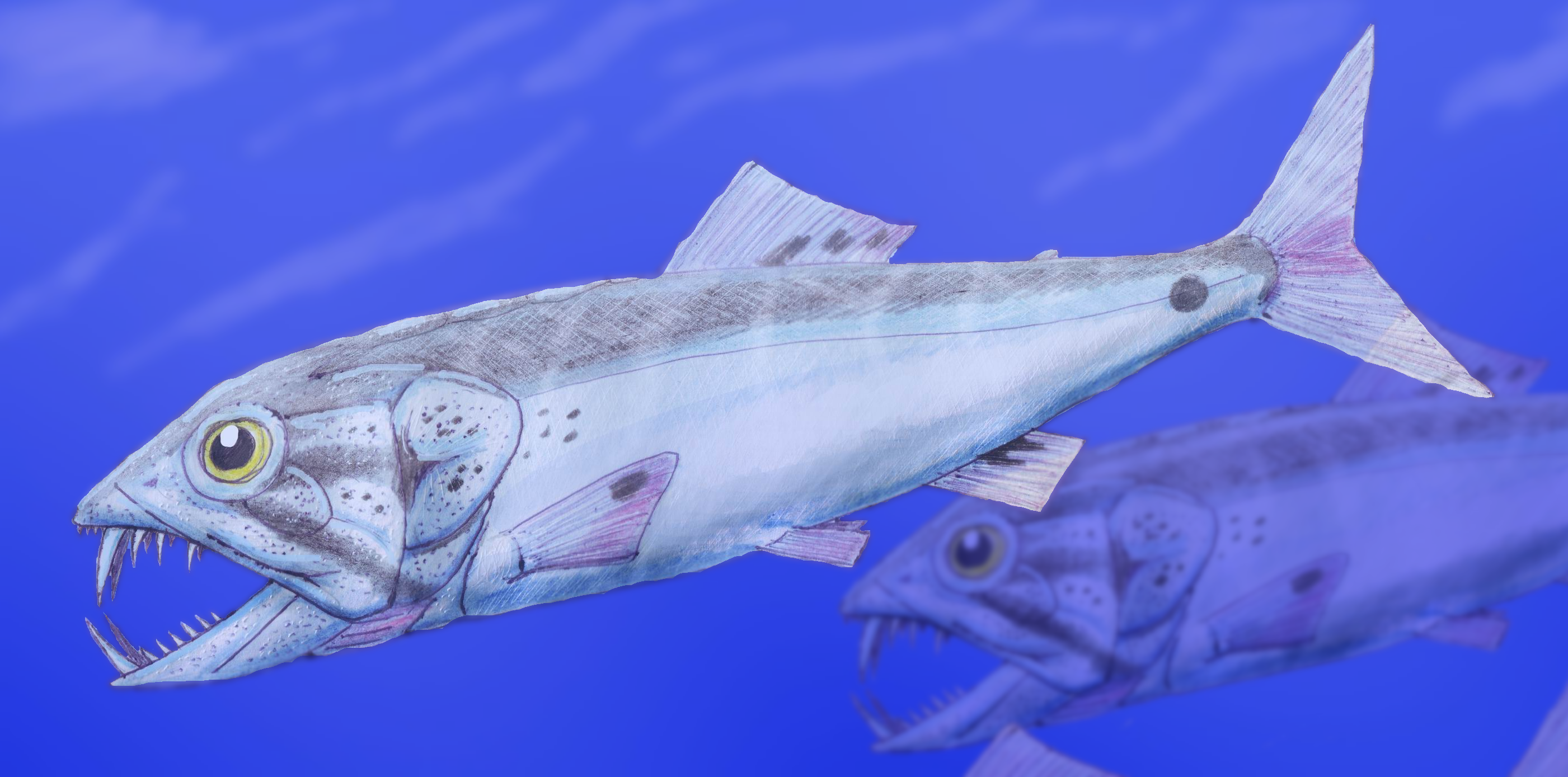
- Restoration of the Early Cretaceous-Eocene bony fish Enchodus, or the "saber-toothed herring"
  †Enchodus
  - †Enchodus petrosus
- †Etea
- †Eulima
- †Euspira
  - †Euspira rectilabrum
- †Exogyra
  - †Exogyra costata
- †Flemingostrea
- †Gegania
- Glossus
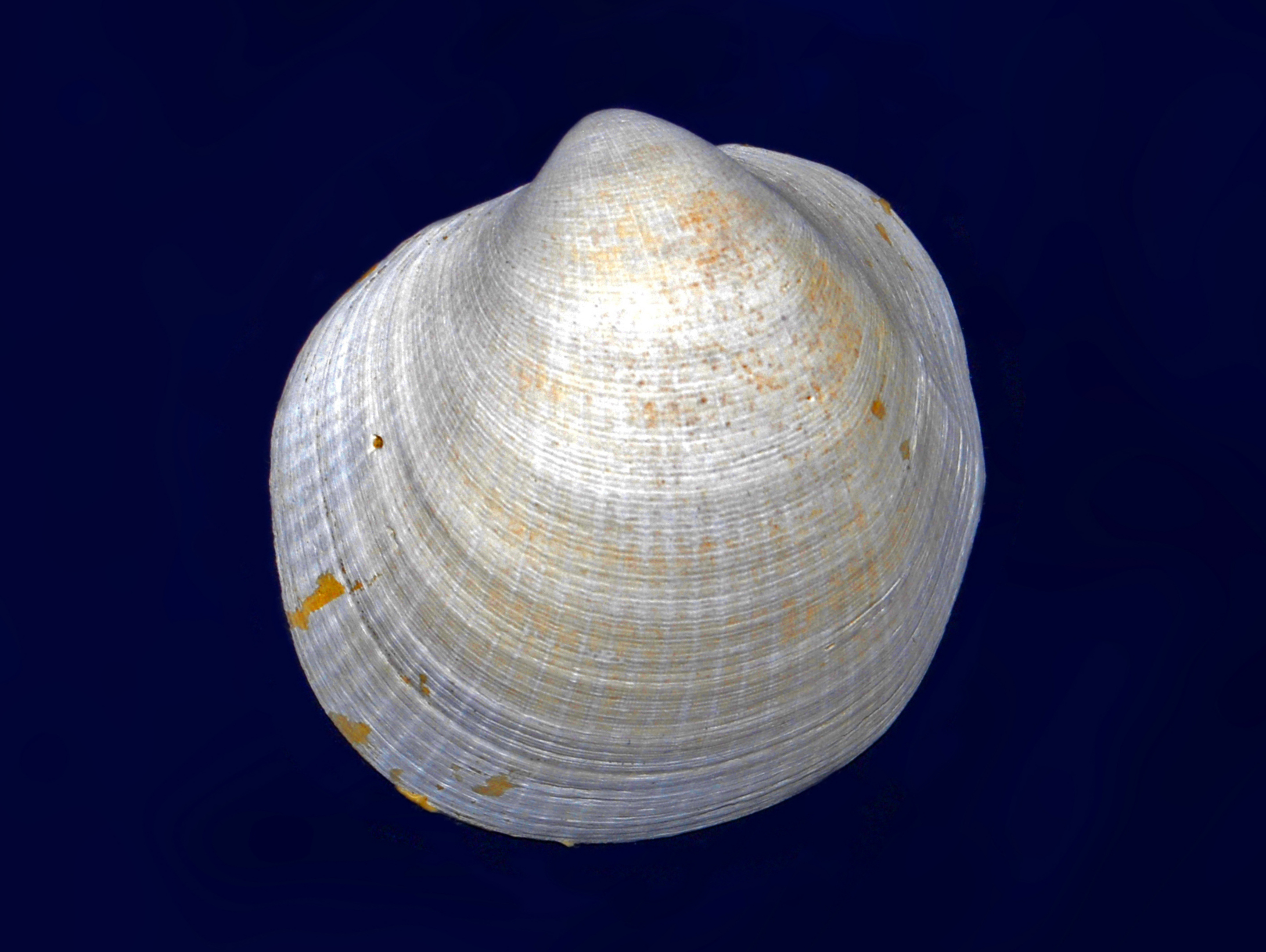
- Fossilized shell of a Glycymeris, or bittersweet clam
  Glycymeris
  - †Glycymeris rotundata
- †Graciliala
- †Granocardium
  - †Granocardium bowenae
  - †Granocardium kuemmeli
  - †Granocardium kummeli
  - †Granocardium lowei
  - †Granocardium trilineatum – or unidentified comparable form
- Gyrodes
  - †Gyrodes spillmani
  - †Gyrodes supraplicatus
- †Hamulus
  - †Hamulus huntensis – tentative report
  - †Hamulus onyx
  - †Hamulus squamosus
- †Harduinia
  - †Harduinia mortonis
- †Helicaulax
  - †Helicaulax formosa
- †Hercorhynchus
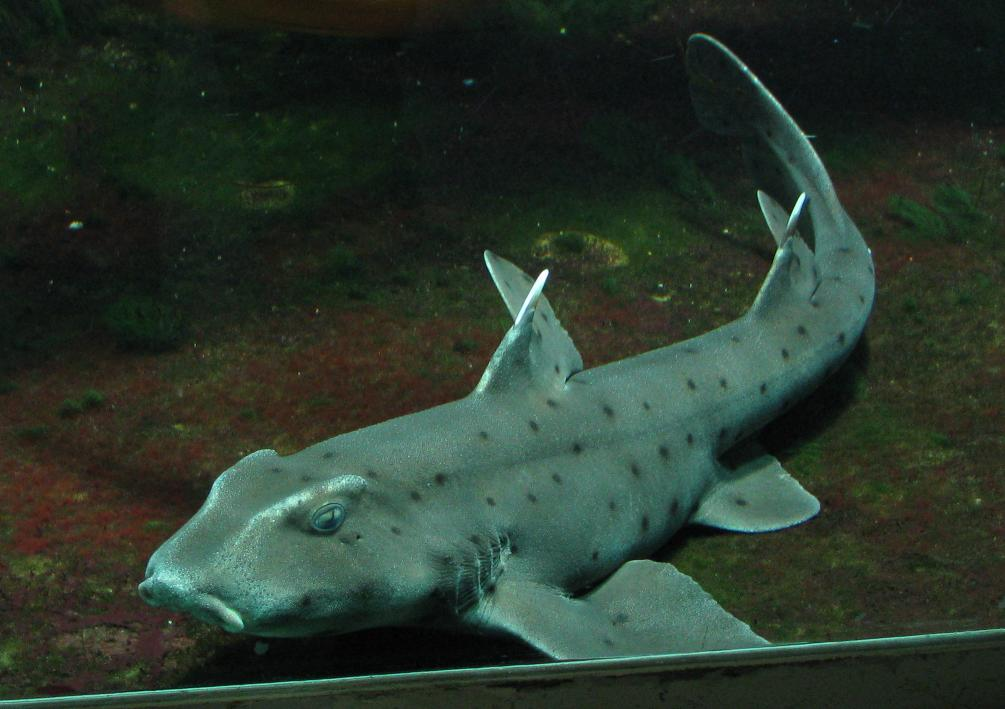
- A living Heterodontus, or bullhead shark
  Heterodontus
  - †Heterodontus granti – or unidentified related form
- †Holkopollenites
  - †Holkopollenites forix
- †Homomya
  - †Homomya thrusheri – tentative report
- †Hybodus
- †Hypolophus
  - †Hypolophus mcnultyi
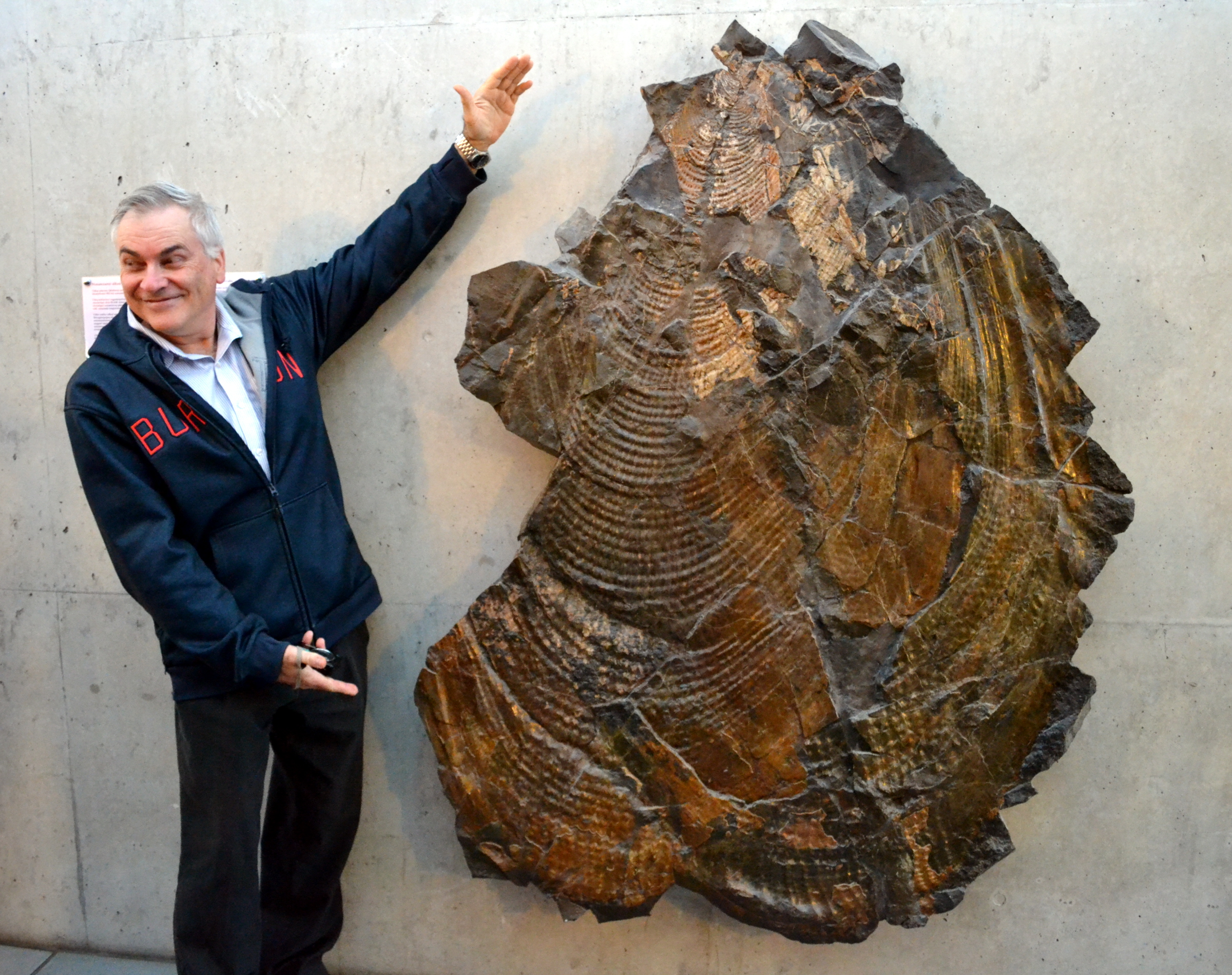
- Fossilized shell of the Early Jurassic-Late Cretaceous marine bivalve Inoceramus with a human indicating its size
  †Inoceramus
- †Ischyrhiza
  - †Ischyrhiza avonicola
  - †Ischyrhiza mira
- Juliacorbula
  - †Juliacorbula monmouthensis
- Laternula
- †Latiala
  - †Latiala lobata – or unidentified comparable form
- †Laxispira
  - †Laxispira monilifera
- †Leptosolen
  - †Leptosolen biplicata
- Lima
  - †Lima pelagica
- Limatula
  - †Limatula acutilineata
- Limopsis
- †Linearis
  - †Linearis magnoliensis
  - †Linearis metastriata
- †Liopeplum
  - †Liopeplum cretaceum
  - †Liopeplum leinodosum
- †Liopistha
  - †Liopistha protexta
- †Liothyris – tentative report
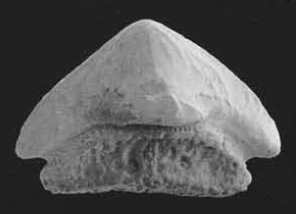
- Electron micrograph of fossilized teeth from the Early Jurassic-Early Cretaceous freshwater shark Lissodus
  †Lissodus
  - †Lissodus babulskii
- Lithophaga
- Lopha
  - †Lopha falcata
- †Lycettia
  - †Lycettia tippana
  - †Lycettia tippanus
- †Margaritella
  - †Margaritella pumila – or unidentified comparable form
- †Mathilda
- †Medionapus
- †Micrabacia
- †Modiolus
  - †Modiolus sedesclaris
  - †Modiolus sedesclarus
  - †Modiolus trigonus
- †Morea
  - †Morea cancellaria
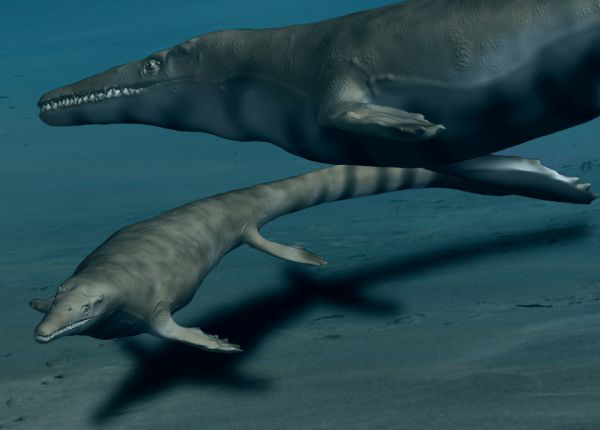
- Life restoration of two of the Late Cretaceous Mosasaurus
  †Mosasaurus
- Myrtea
  - †Myrtea stephensoni
- †Nemodon
  - †Nemodon eufalensis
  - †Nemodon eufaulensis
- †Nonactaeonina
- Nucula
  - †Nucula cuneifrons
  - †Nucula percrassa
- Nuculana
  - †Nuculana whitfieldi
- †Nymphalucina
  - †Nymphalucina linearia
- †Ornopsis – tentative report
- Ostrea
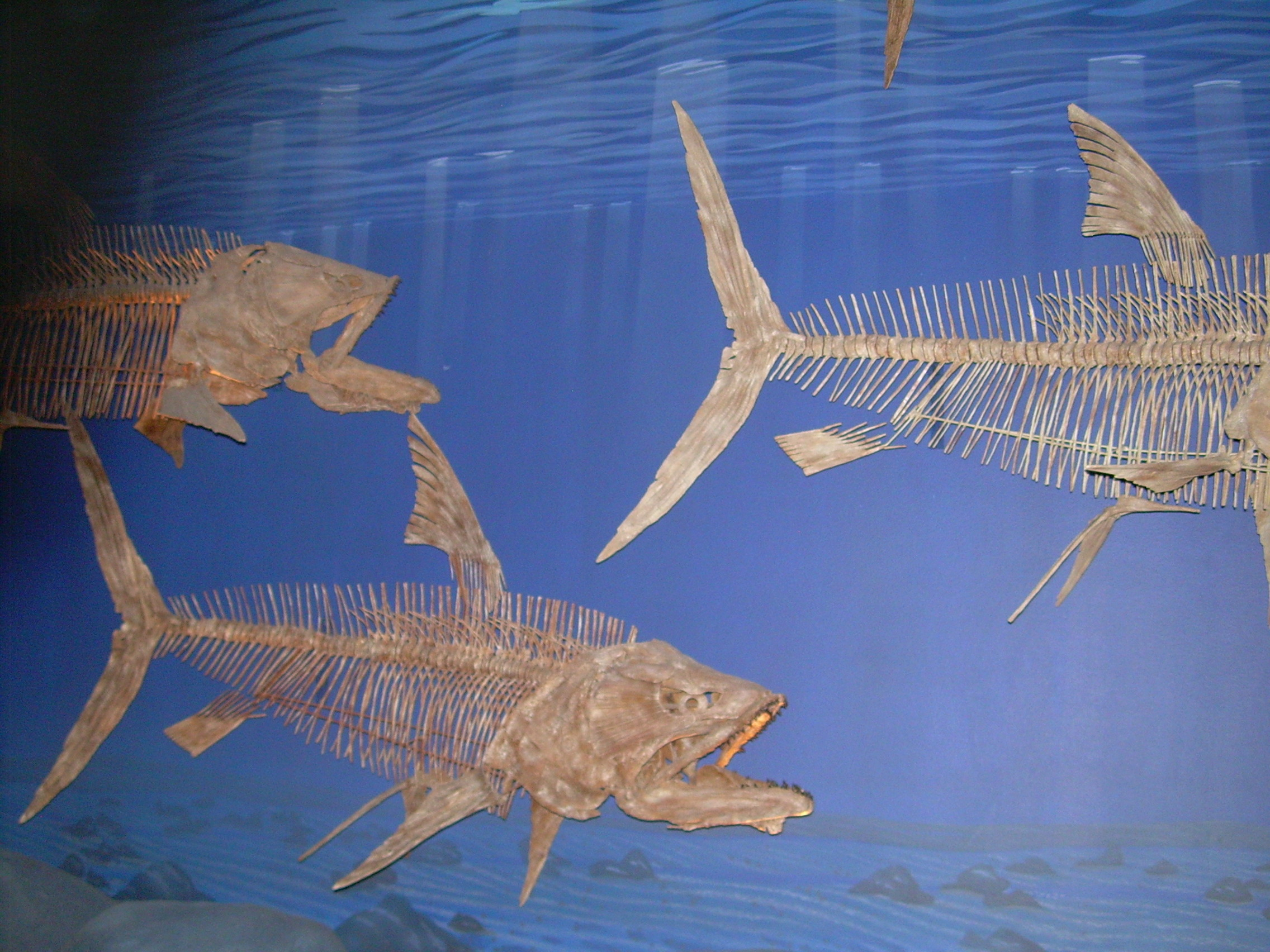
- Fossilized skeletons of the Late Cretaceous bony fish Pachyrhizodus
  †Pachyrhizodus – or unidentified comparable form
- †Paladmete
  - †Paladmete cancellaria
- †Paralbula
  - †Paralbula casei
- †Pararhincodon
- †Parmicorbula
  - †Parmicorbula terramaria
- †Periplomya
- †Pleuriocardia
  - †Pleuriocardia eufaulense
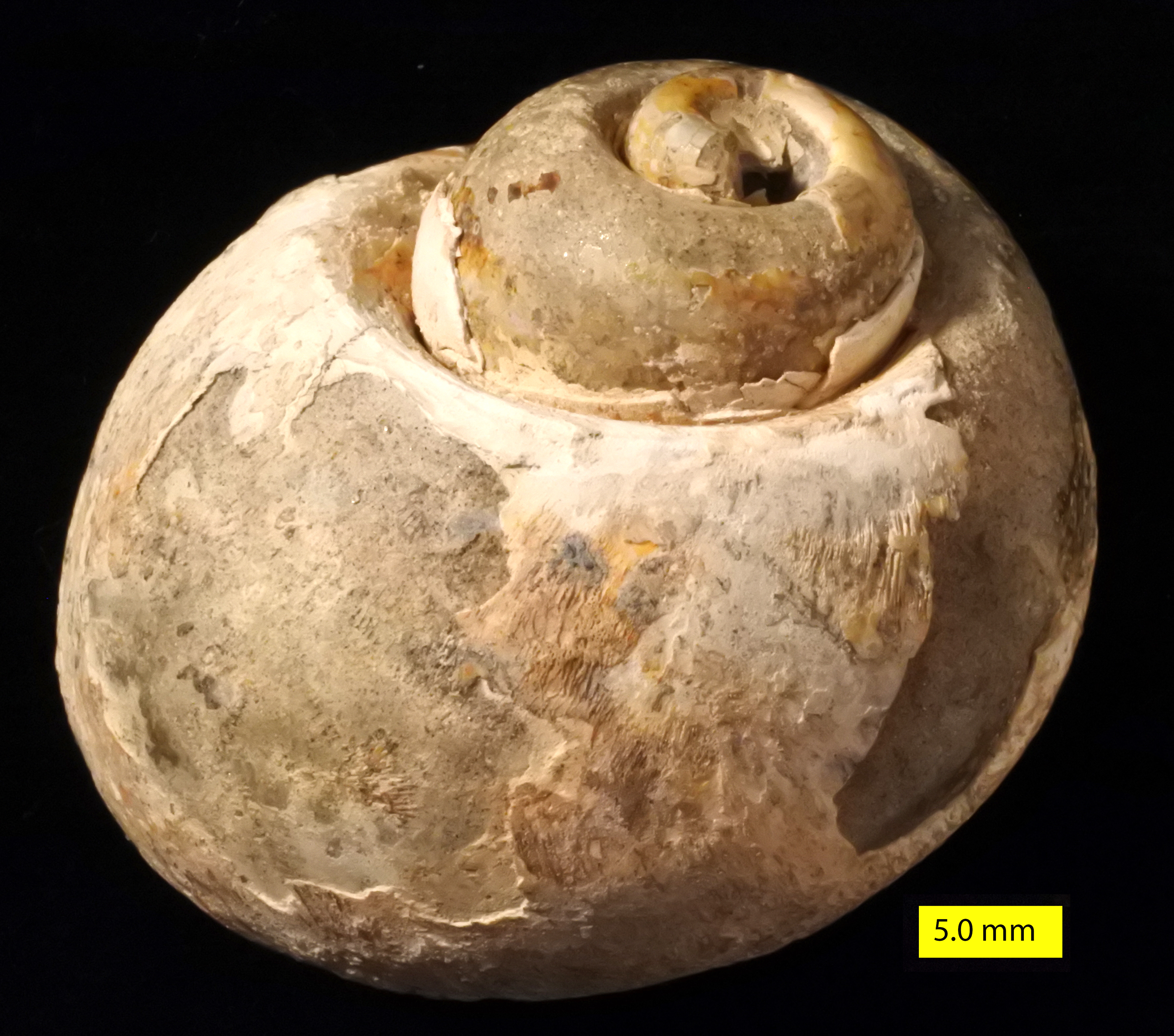
- Fossilized shell of the Paleocene-modern moon snail Polinices
  Polinices
- †Postligata
  - †Postligata wordeni
- †Protocardia
  - †Protocardia spillmani
- †Pseudolimea
  - †Pseudolimea reticulata
- Pseudomalaxis
  - †Pseudomalaxis pilsbryi
- †Pteria
- †Pterocerella
- †Pterotrigonia
  - †Pterotrigonia cerulea
  - †Pterotrigonia eufalensis
  - †Pterotrigonia eufaulensis
- †Ptychotrygon
  - †Ptychotrygon vermiculata
- Pycnodonte
  - †Pycnodonte vesicularis
- †Pyrifusus
- †Remera
- Rhinobatos
  - †Rhinobatos casieri
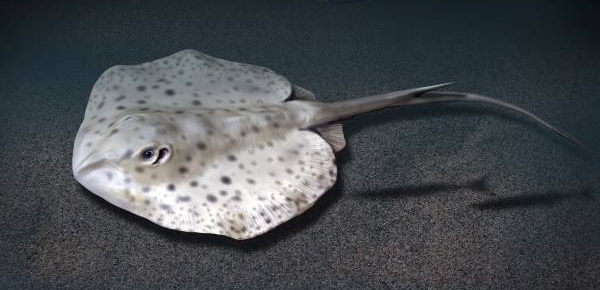
- Restoration of the Late Cretaceous-Paleocene ray Rhombodus
  †Rhombodus
  - †Rhombodus binkhorsti
  - †Rhombodus laevis
- Ringicula
  - †Ringicula clarki
- †Sargana
  - †Sargana stantoni
- †Schizorhiza
  - †Schizorhiza stromeri
- Serpula
- Solemya
- †Solyma
  - †Solyma elliptica – or unidentified related form
- †Sphenodiscus
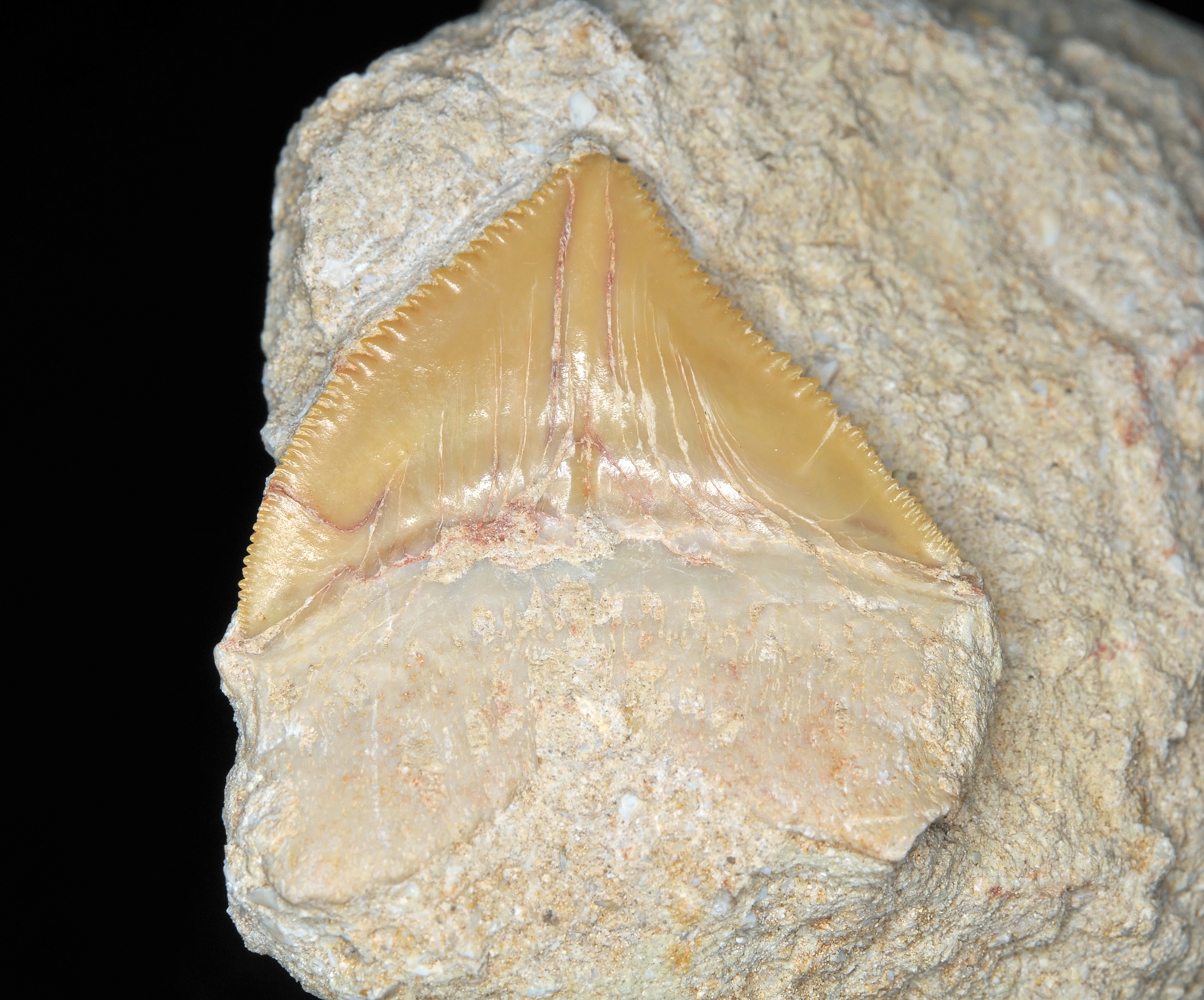
- Fossilized tooth of the Late Cretaceous shark Squalicorax
  Squalicorax
  - †Squalicorax kaupi
  - †Squalicorax pristodontus
- Squatina
  - †Squatina hassei
- †Stantonella
- †Stephanodus – report made of unidentified related form or using admittedly obsolete nomenclature
- Striarca
  - †Striarca saffordi
- †Syncyclonema
  - †Syncyclonema simplicius
- Tellina
- †Tellinimera
  - †Tellinimera buboana
  - †Tellinimera gabbi
- †Trachybaculites
  - †Trachybaculites columna
- Trachycardium
  - †Trachycardium eufaulensis
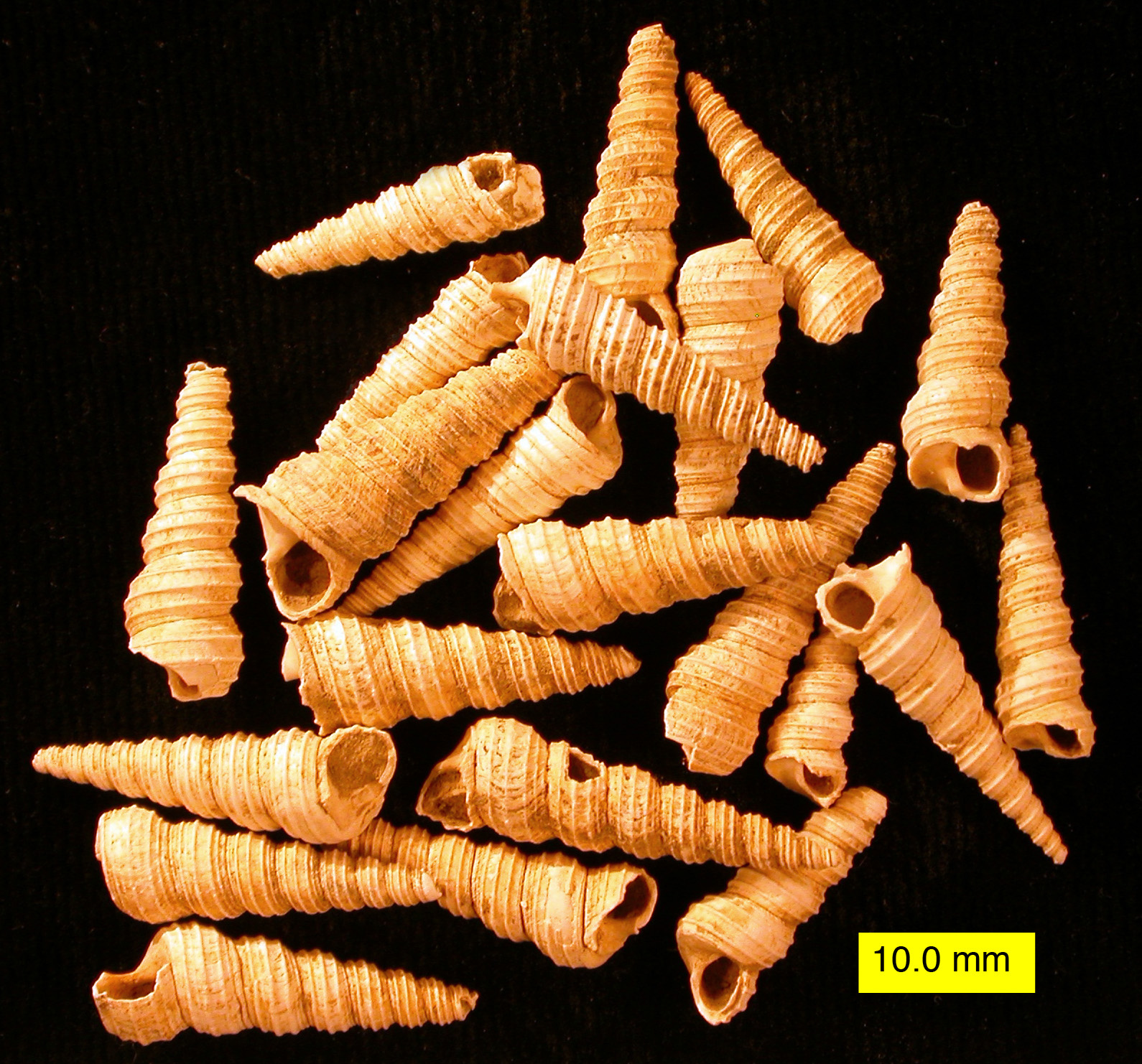
- Fossilized shells of the Late Jurassic-modern tower snail Turritella
  Turritella
  - †Turritella bilira
  - †Turritella penderensis
  - †Turritella pointensis
  - †Turritella tippana
  - †Turritella trilira
  - †Turritella vertebroides
- †Uddenia
- †Unicardium
  - †Unicardium concentricum
- †Veniella
  - †Veniella conradi
- †Vetericardiella
  - †Vetericardiella crenalirata

== Cenozoic ==
=== Selected Cenozoic taxa of South Carolina ===
- †Abra
- Acanthocardia
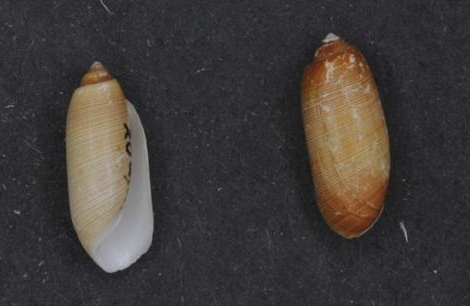
- Shells of Acteocina barrel-bubble sea snails
  Acteocina
- Acteon
- †Adeorbis
- †Adocus
- Aequipecten
- Agaronia
- Agassizia
- †Aglyptorhynchus
- †Agorophius
- Alligator
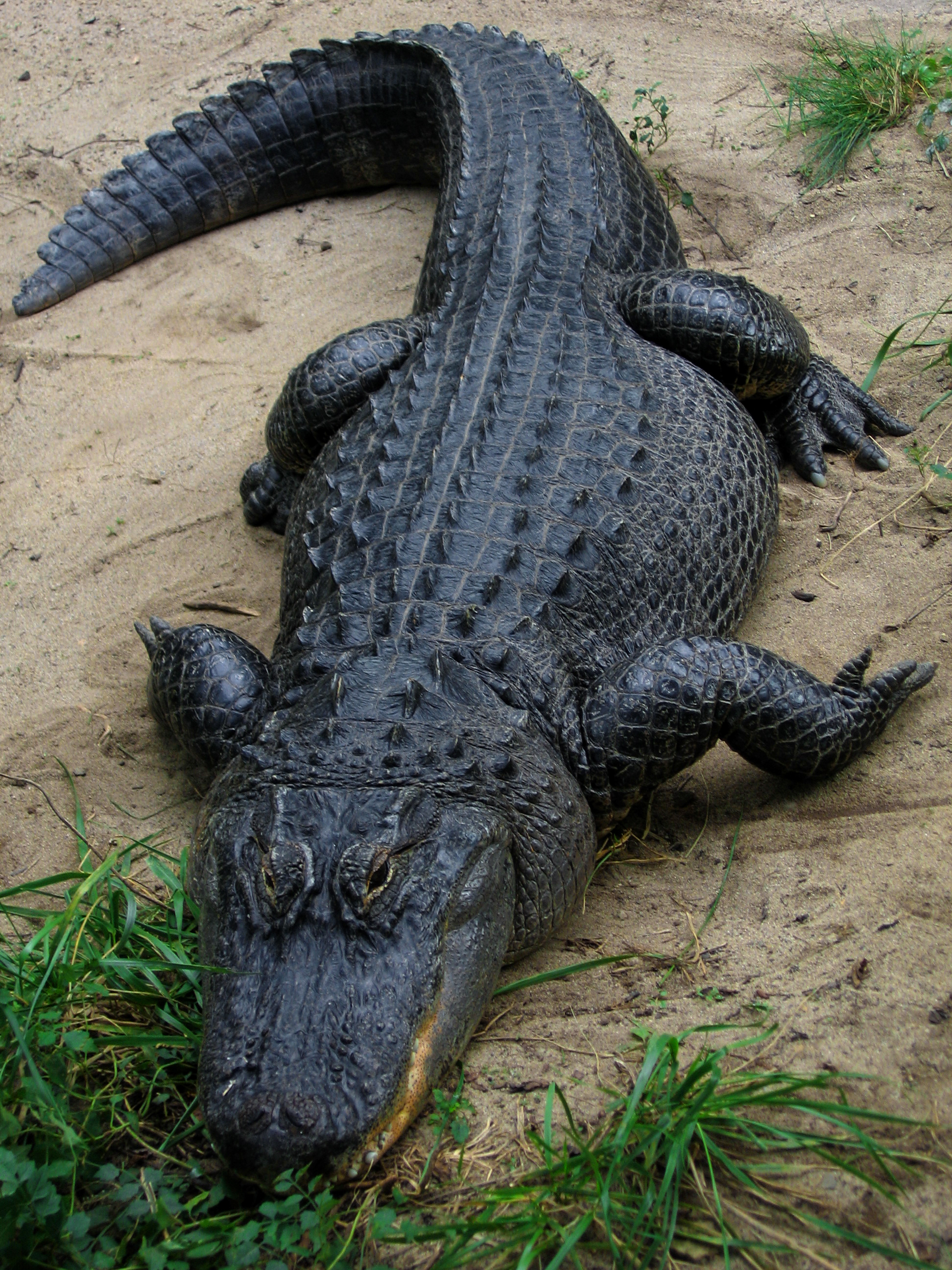
  - A living Alligator mississippiensis, or American alligator
    †Alligator mississippiensis
- Alopias
  - †Alopias vulpinus – or unidentified comparable form
- †Anotodus
  - †Anotodus agassizii
- †Altrix
- †Amalthea
- Ammonia
- Amphistegina
- Amusium
- Anachis
- Anadara
  - †Anadara brasiliana
  - †Anadara ovalis
  - †Anadara transversa
- Anatina
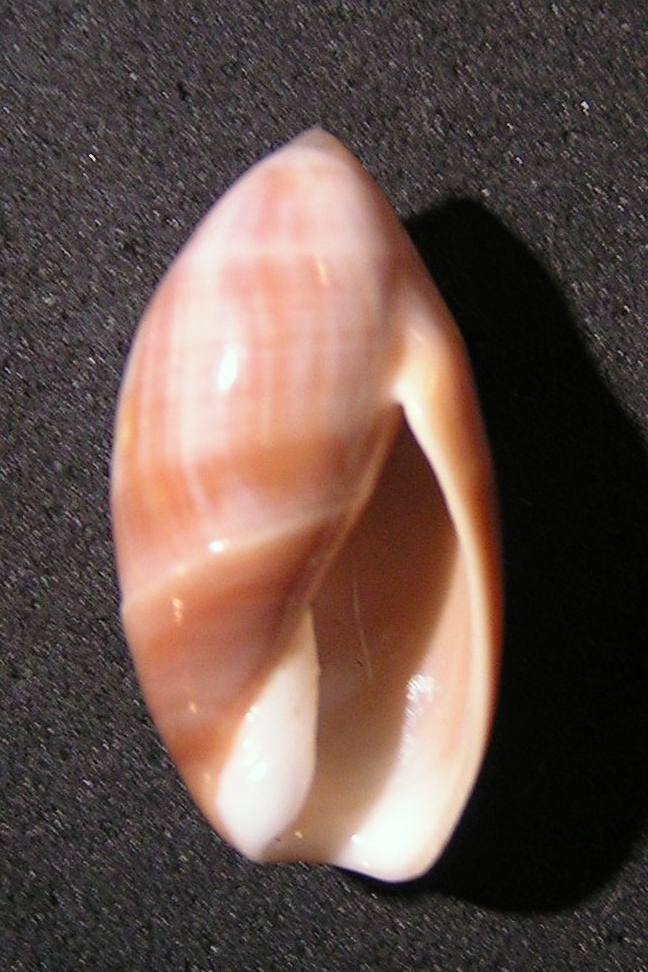
- Shell of an Ancilla sea snail
  Ancilla
- Angaria – report made of unidentified related form or using admittedly obsolete nomenclature
- Angulus
- Anomia
  - †Anomia simplex
- Antalis
- Antigona
- Arbacia
- Arca
  - †Arca imbricata
- Architectonica
- Arcinella
  - †Arcinella arcinella
  - †Arcinella cornuta
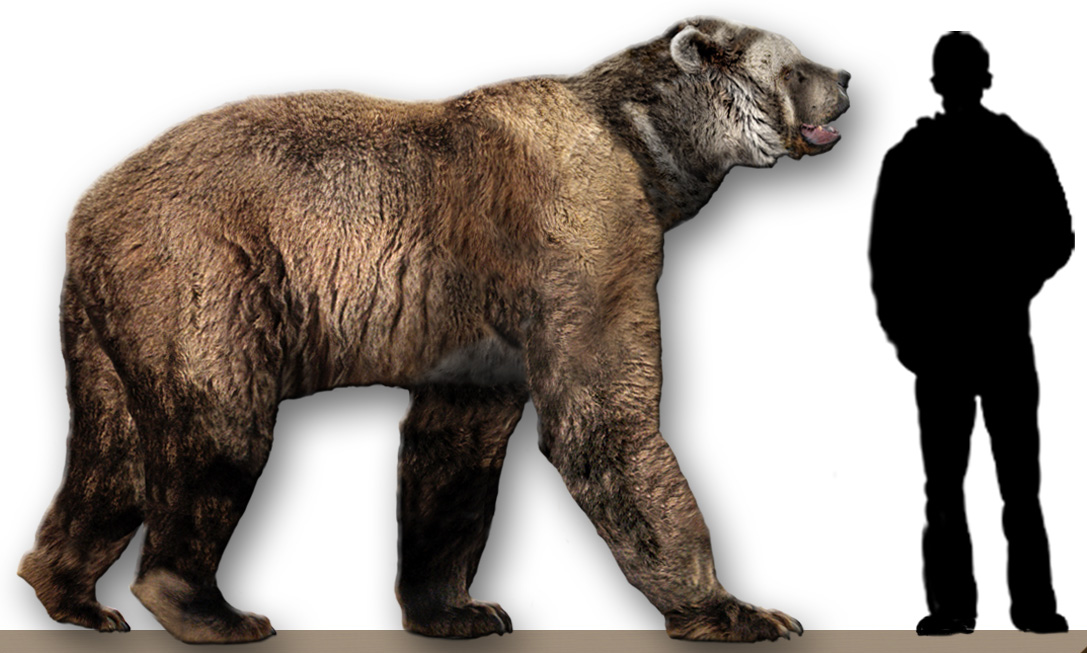
- Restoration of an Arctodus, or short-faced bear, with a human to scale
  †Arctodus
  - †Arctodus pristinus
- Argopecten
  - †Argopecten gibbus
  - †Argopecten irradians
- Argyrotheca
- Artena
- Astarte
- Astyris
  - †Astyris lunata
- Athleta
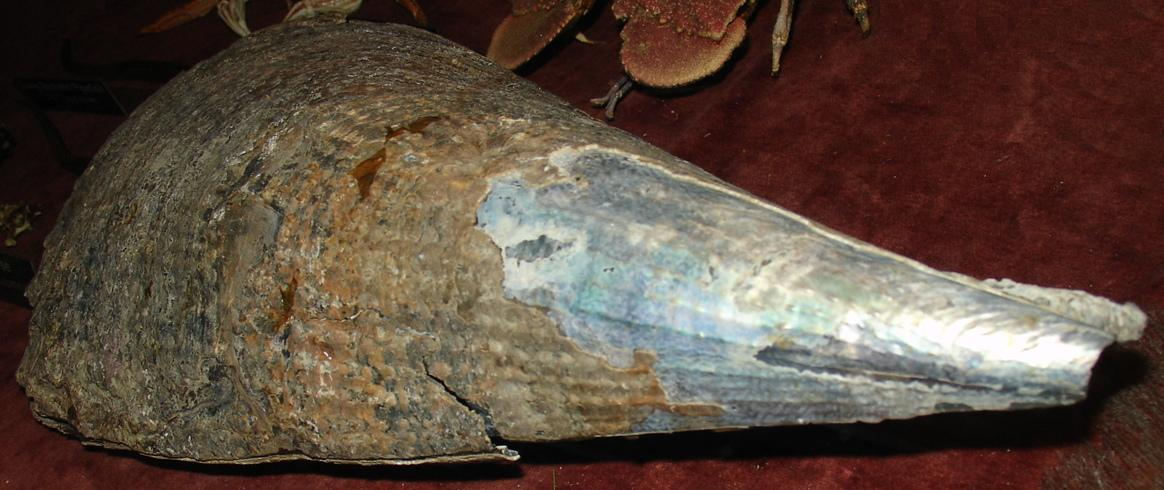
- Shell of an Atrina pen shell
  Atrina
  - †Atrina rigida
  - †Atrina seminuda
  - †Atrina serrata
- †Aturia
- Aulacomya
- Balaenoptera
- Balanophyllia
- Balanus
- Barbatia
- Barnea
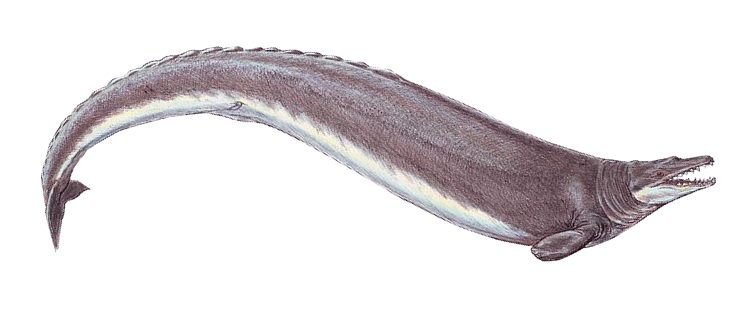
- Life restoration of the Eocene whale Basilosaurus
  †Basilosaurus
- Bison
  - †Bison antiquus
- †Bonellitia
- Boonea
  - †Boonea seminuda
- †Borophagus
  - †Borophagus hilli – or unidentified comparable form
- Borsonia
- Bostrycapulus
  - †Bostrycapulus aculeatus
- †Bottosaurus
  - †Braarudosphaera bigelowii
- Brachidontes
  - †Brachidontes exustus
- Buccella
- Bullia
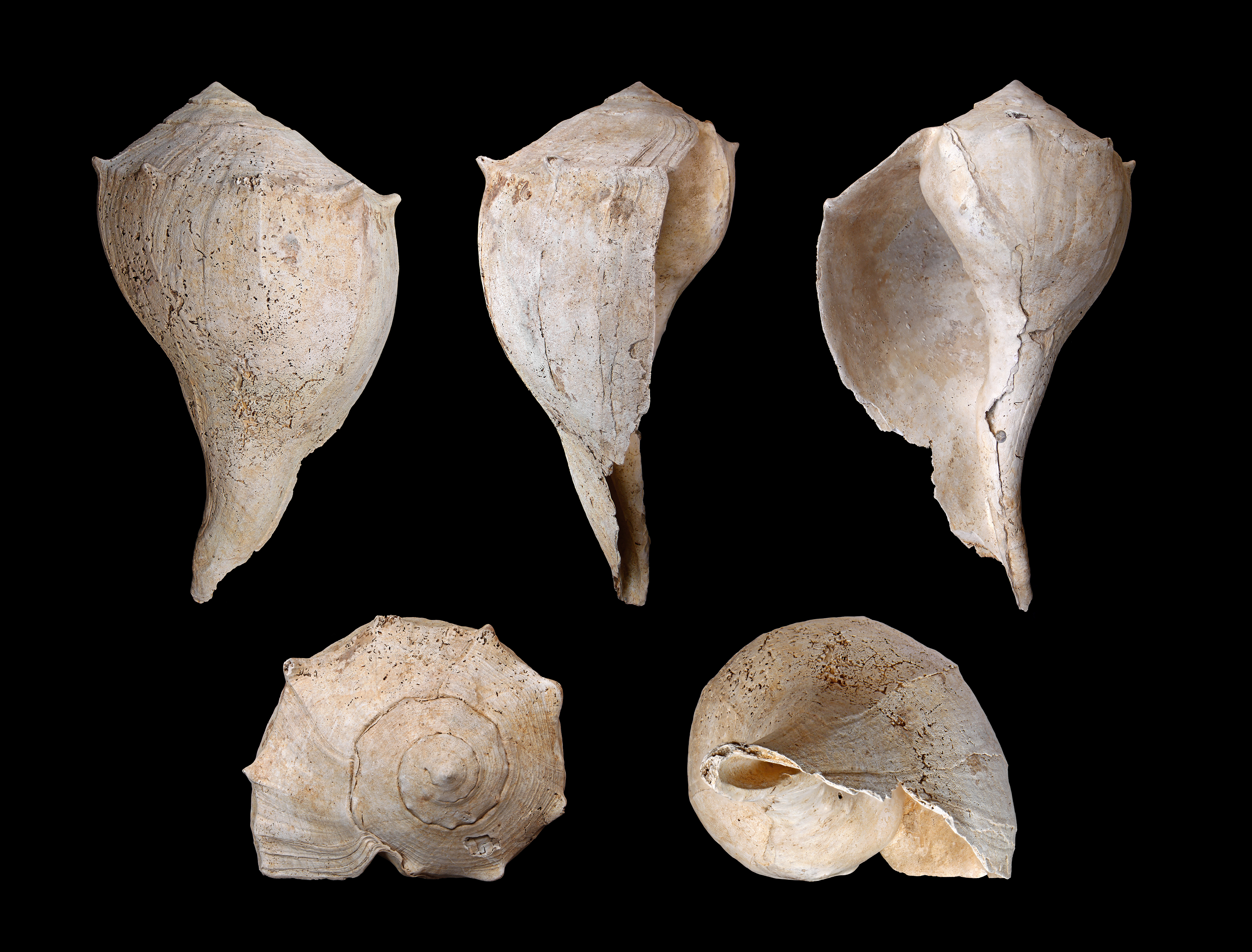
- Fossilized shell in multiple views of a Busycon sea snail
  Busycon
  - †Busycon carica
  - †Busycon contrarium
  - †Busycon perversum
- Busycotypus
  - †Busycotypus canaliculatus
- †Bythaelurus
- Cadulus
- Caecum
  - †Caecum cooperi
  - †Caecum imbricatum
- Caestocorbula
- Calliostoma
- Callista
- Calotrophon
  - †Calotrophon ostrearum
- Calyptraea
  - †Calyptraea centralis
- Cancellaria
  - †Cancellaria reticulata
- Canis
  - †Canis armbrusteri
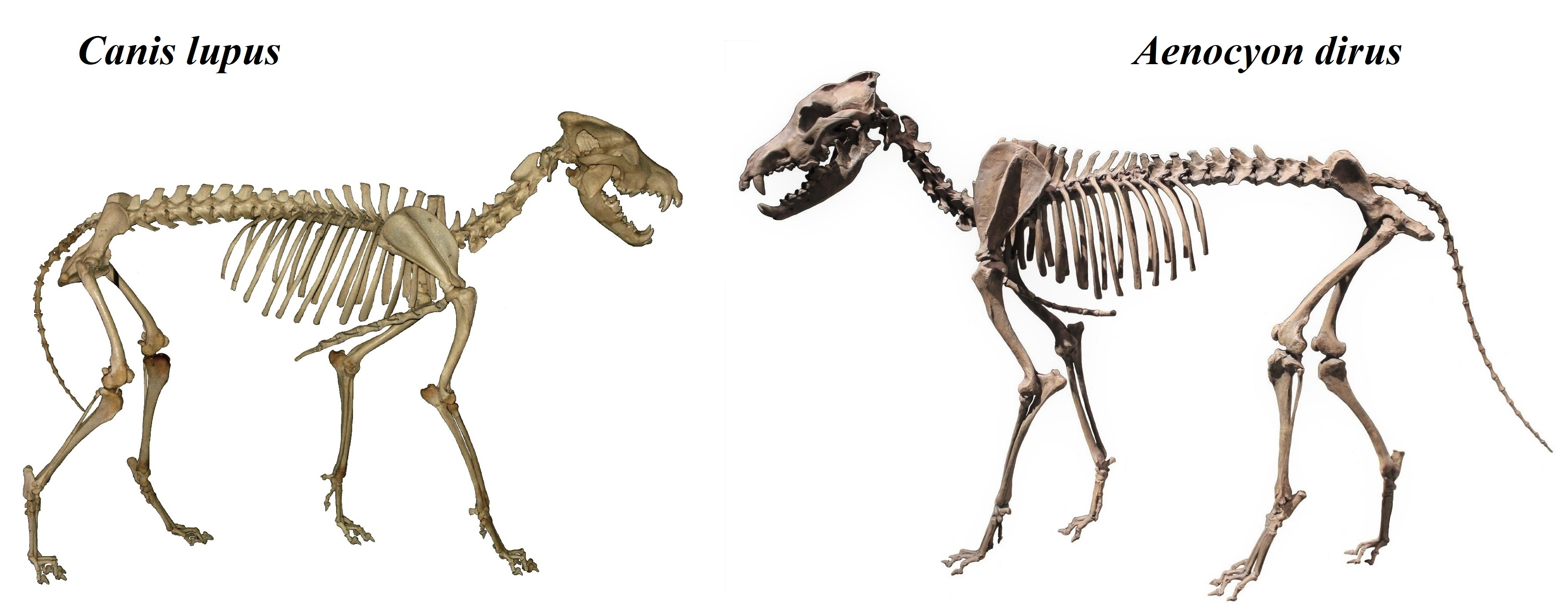
  - Modern mounted skeleton of Canis lupus, the grey wolf, to scale with a fossilized skeleton of the Pleistocene wolf Canis dirus, or dire wolf
    †Canis dirus
- Carcharhinus
- Carcharias
- Carcharodon
  - †Carcharodon hastalis
- Cardita
- Carditamera
- †Carolinacetus – type locality for genus
- Cassidulina
- Castor
  - †Castor canadensis
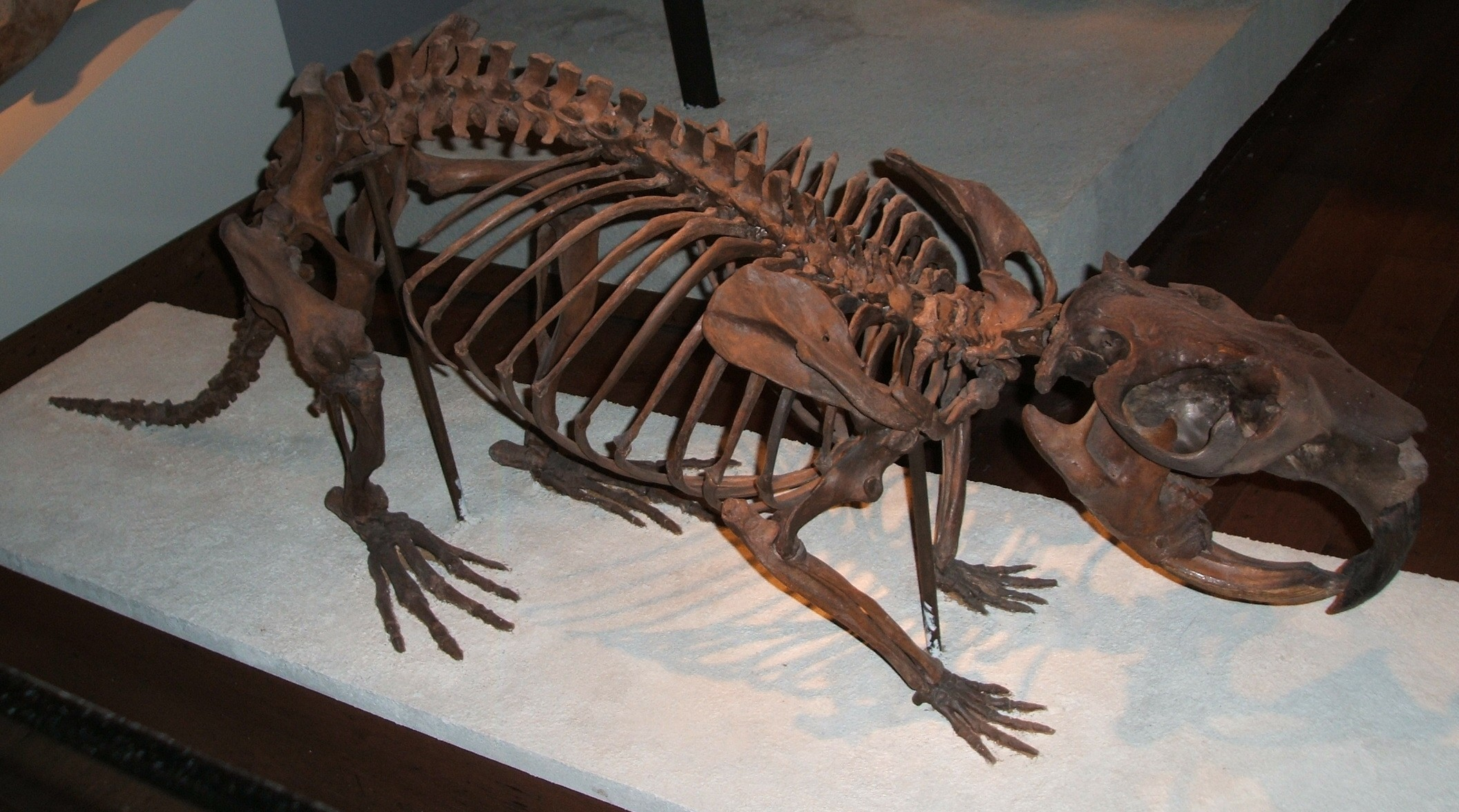
- Mounted fossilized skeleton of the Pliocene-Pleistocene giant beaver Castoroides
  †Castoroides
  - †Castoroides leiseyorum
  - †Castoroides ohioensis – or unidentified comparable form
- Cerithiella – tentative report
- Cerithiopsis
  - †Cerithiopsis emersonii
- Cerithium – tentative report
- †Cervalces
  - †Cervalces scotti
- Cervus
  - †Cervus elaphus
- Chama
  - †Chama congregata
- Cheilea
- Chelydra
  - †Chelydra serpentina
- †Chesapecten
  - †Chesapecten jeffersonius
- Chicoreus
- Chione
  - †Chione cancellata
- Chlamys
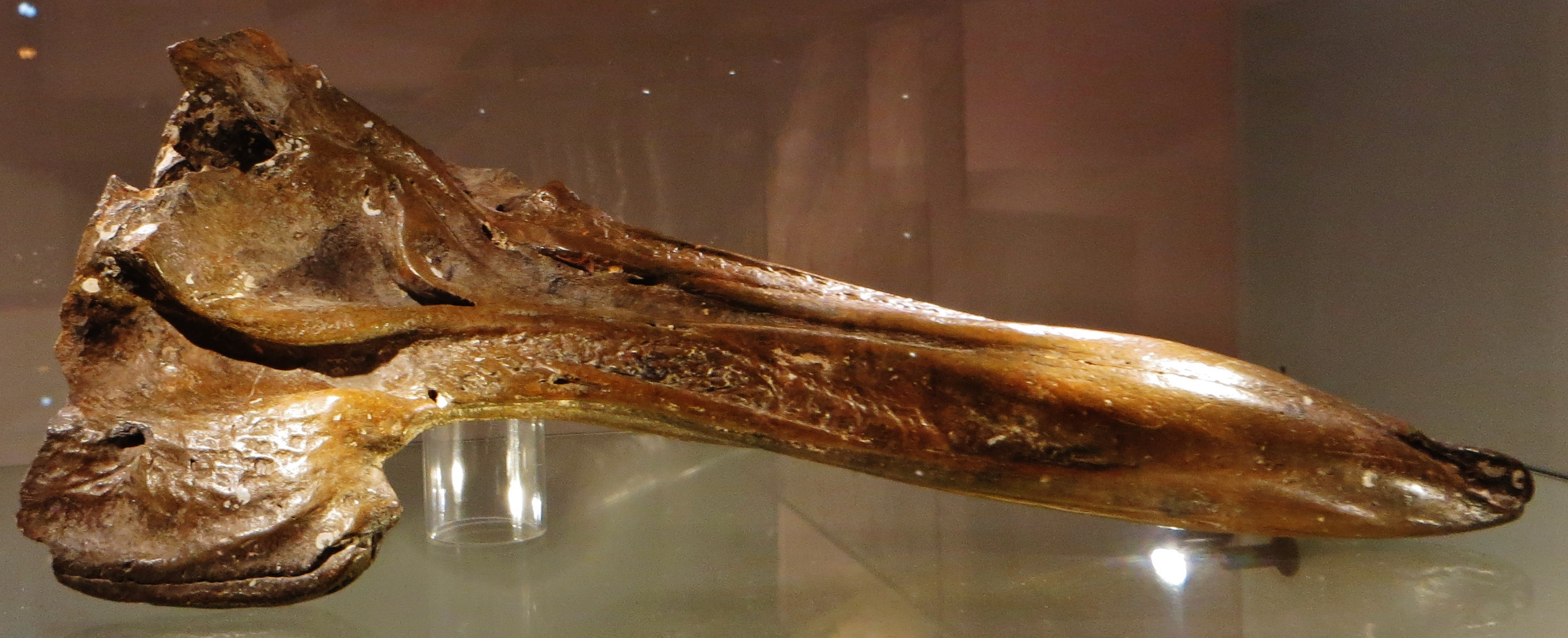
- Skull
  †Choneziphius
- Chrysemys
  - †Chrysemys floridana
- †Chrysocetus – type locality for genus
- Cibicides
- Cidaris
- Cinctura
  - †Cinctura lilium
- Cirsotrema
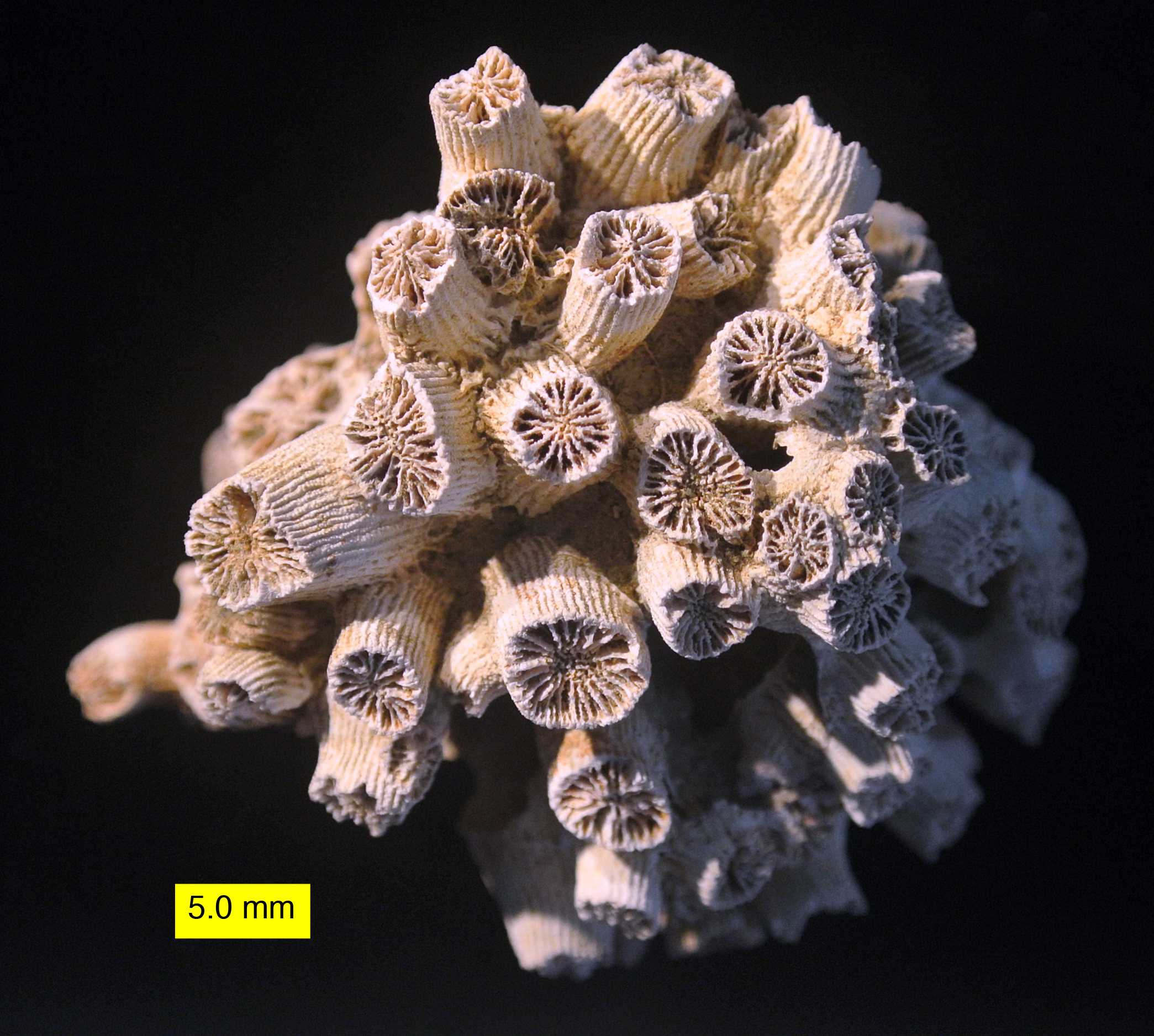
- Fossilized Cladocora stony coral
  Cladocora
- Clavilithes
- Clavus
- Cliona
- Closia
- Coccolithus
- Cochlespira
- Cochliolepis
- Coelopleurus
- Coluber – or unidentified comparable form
- Columbellopsis
- Concavus
- Conomitra
- Conus
  - †Conus delessertii
  - †Conus jaspideus
- Coralliophila
- Corbicula
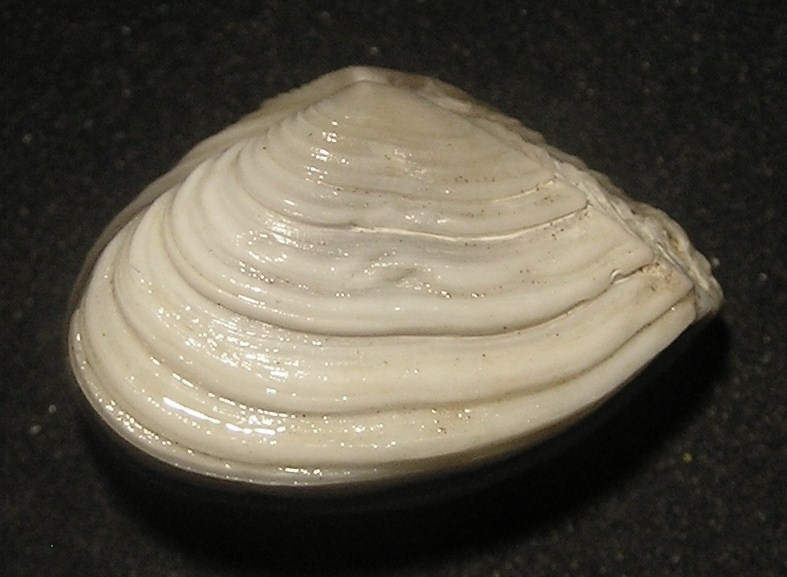
- Shell of a Corbula basket clam
  Corbula
- †Coronodon – type locality for genus
- †Cotylocara – type locality for genus
- †Coupatezia
  - †Crassinella lunulata
- Crassostrea
  - †Crassostrea virginica
- Crepidula
  - †Crepidula convexa
  - †Crepidula fornicata
  - †Crepidula plana
- †Cretolamna
  - †Cretolamna appendiculata
- Crucibulum
- Cryptonatica
- Cucullaea
- Cumingia
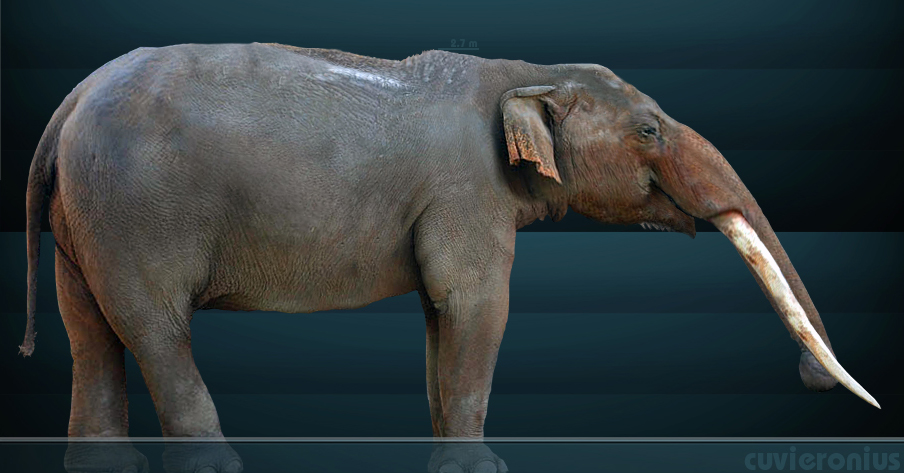
- Life restoration of the Pliocene-Holocene elephant relative Cuvieronius
  †Cuvieronius
- Cyclocardia
- Cylichna
- Cymbovula
  - †Cymbovula acicularis
- Cypraea
- Cythara
- Cytherea
- Daphnella
- Dasyatis
- Dasypus
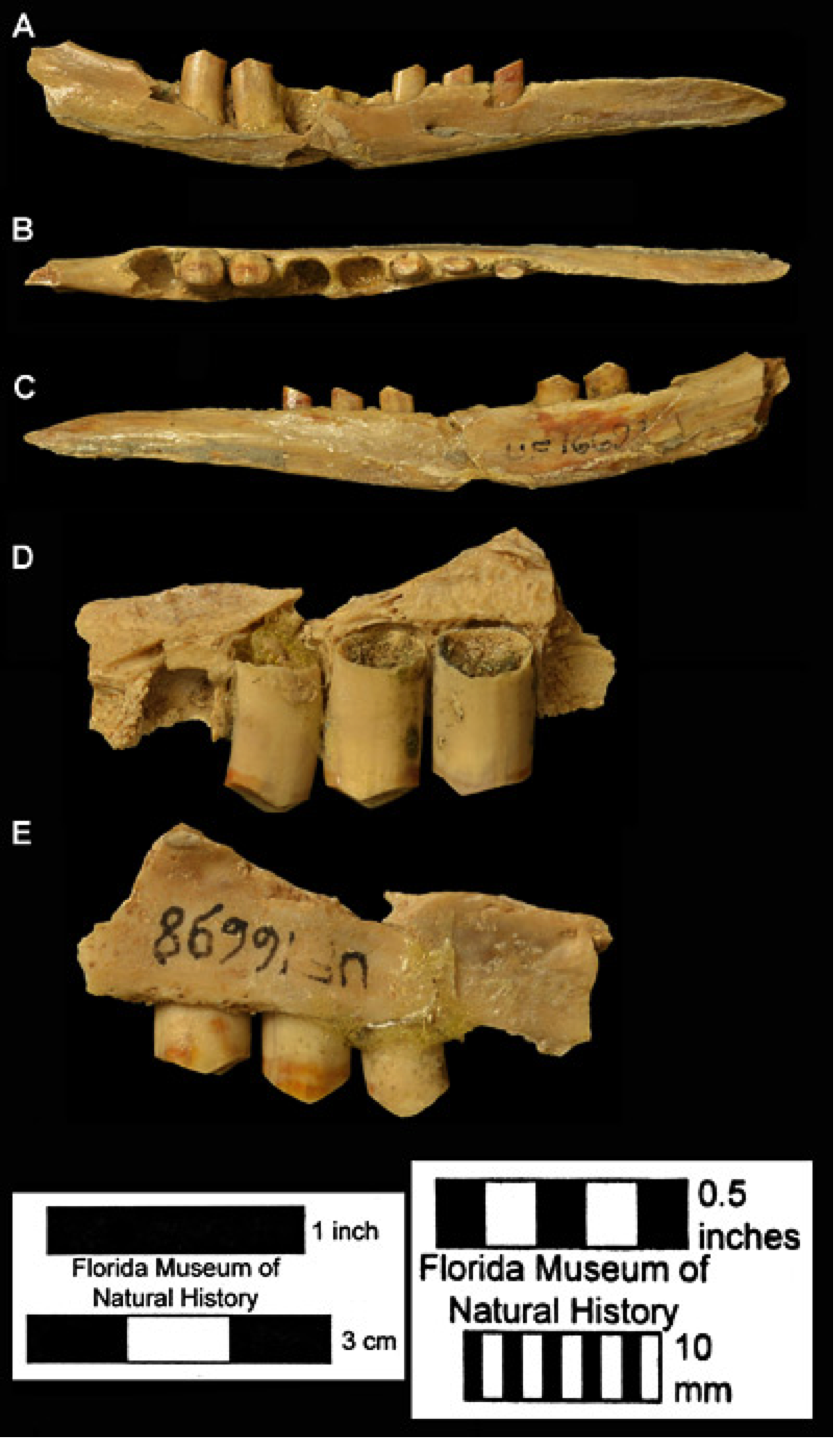
  - Fossilized mandible in multiple views of the Pleistocene Dasypus bellus, or beautiful armadillo
    †Dasypus bellus
- Dendraster
- Dentalium
- Dentimargo
  - †Dentimargo aureocinctus
- Dinocardium
  - †Dinocardium robustum
- Diodon
- Diodora
  - †Diodora cayenensis
  - †Diplodonta punctata
  - †Diplodonta semiaspera
- Discinisca
- †Discoaster
- Discorbis
- Donax
  - †Donax fossor
  - †Donax variabilis
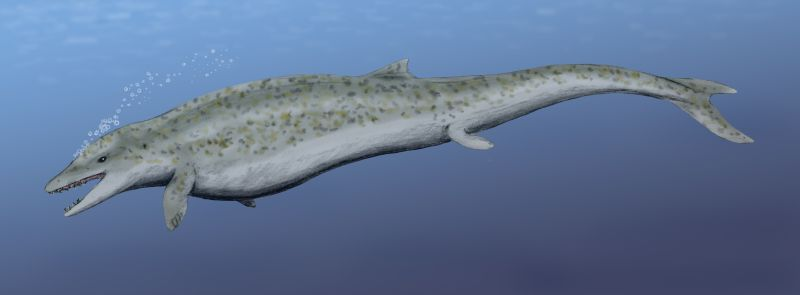
- Life restoration of the Eocene whaleDorudon
  †Dorudon – type locality for genus
  - †Dorudon serratus – type locality for species
- Dosinia
- Echinocardium
- †Echovenator – type locality for genus
- †Ecphora
- Elaphe – or unidentified comparable form
- Elphidium
- Ensis
  - †Ensis directus
  - †Ensis minor
- †Eomysticetus – type locality for genus
- †Eosurcula
- Epitonium
  - †Epitonium humphreysii
- Equus
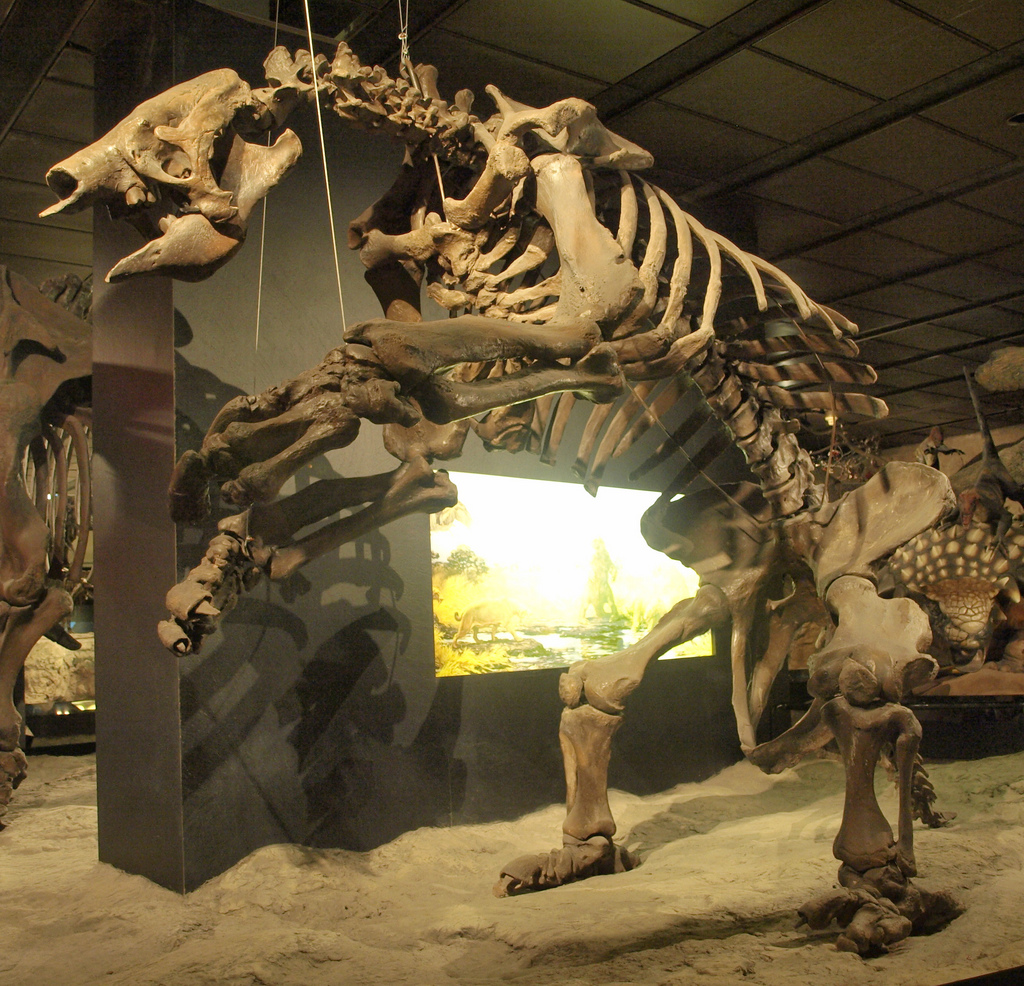
- Mounted fossilized skeleton of the Pliocene-Pleistocene ground sloth Eremotherium
  †Eremotherium
  - †Eremotherium laurillardi
- Erethizon
  - †Erethizon dorsatum
- Erignathus
  - †Erignathus barbatus
- Ervilia
- Erycina
  - †Eucrassatella speciosa
- Eupleura
  - †Eupleura caudata
- Euspira
  - †Euspira heros
- †Eutrephoceras
- Evalea
- Fasciolaria
  - †Fasciolaria tulipa
- †Ficopsis
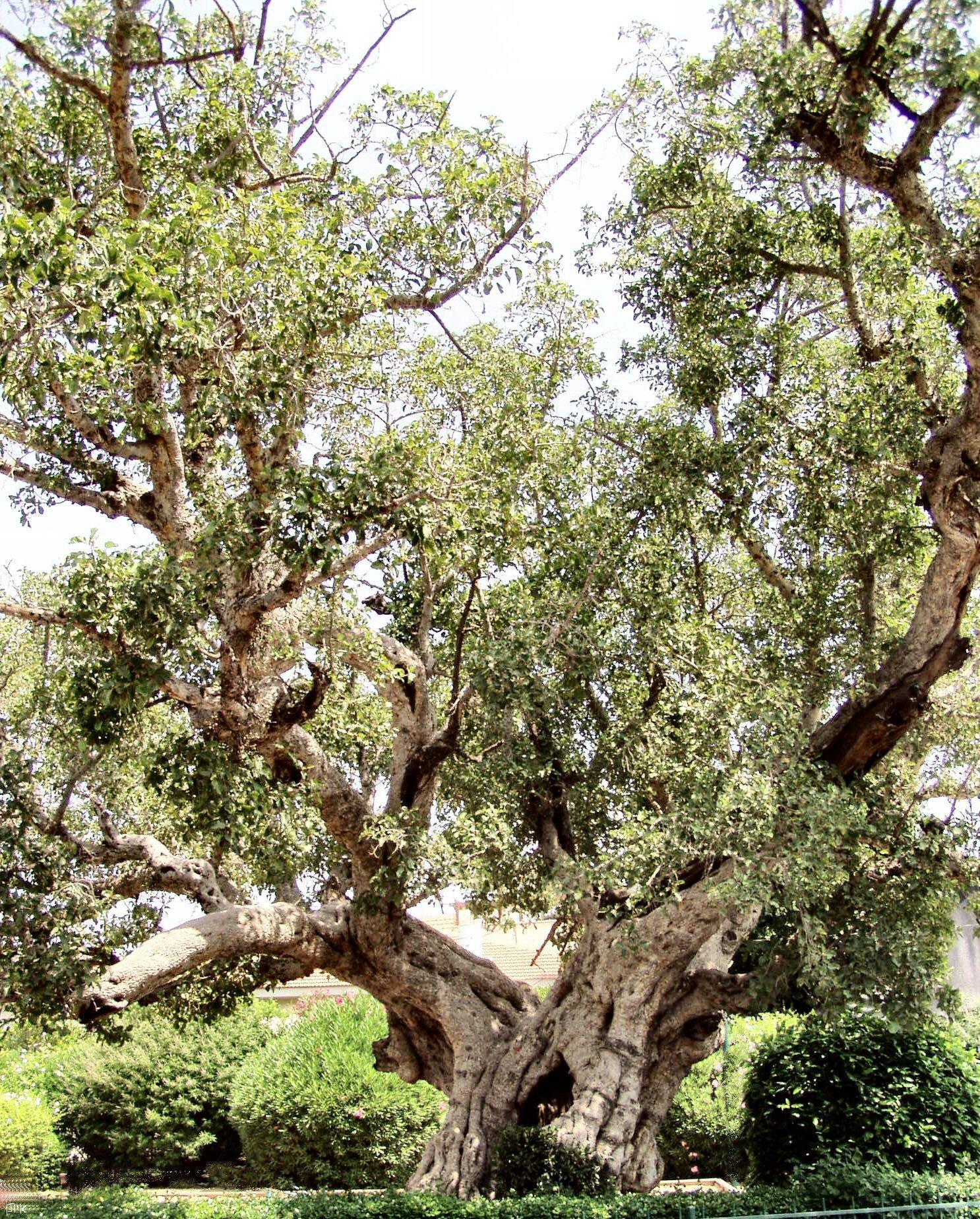
- A living Ficus, or fig tree
  Ficus
- Finella
  - †Finella dubia
- Flabellum
- Fusinus
- Galeocerdo
  - †Galeocerdo aduncus
  - †Galeocerdo cuvier
- Galeodea
- Galeorhinus
- Gari
- Gastrochaena
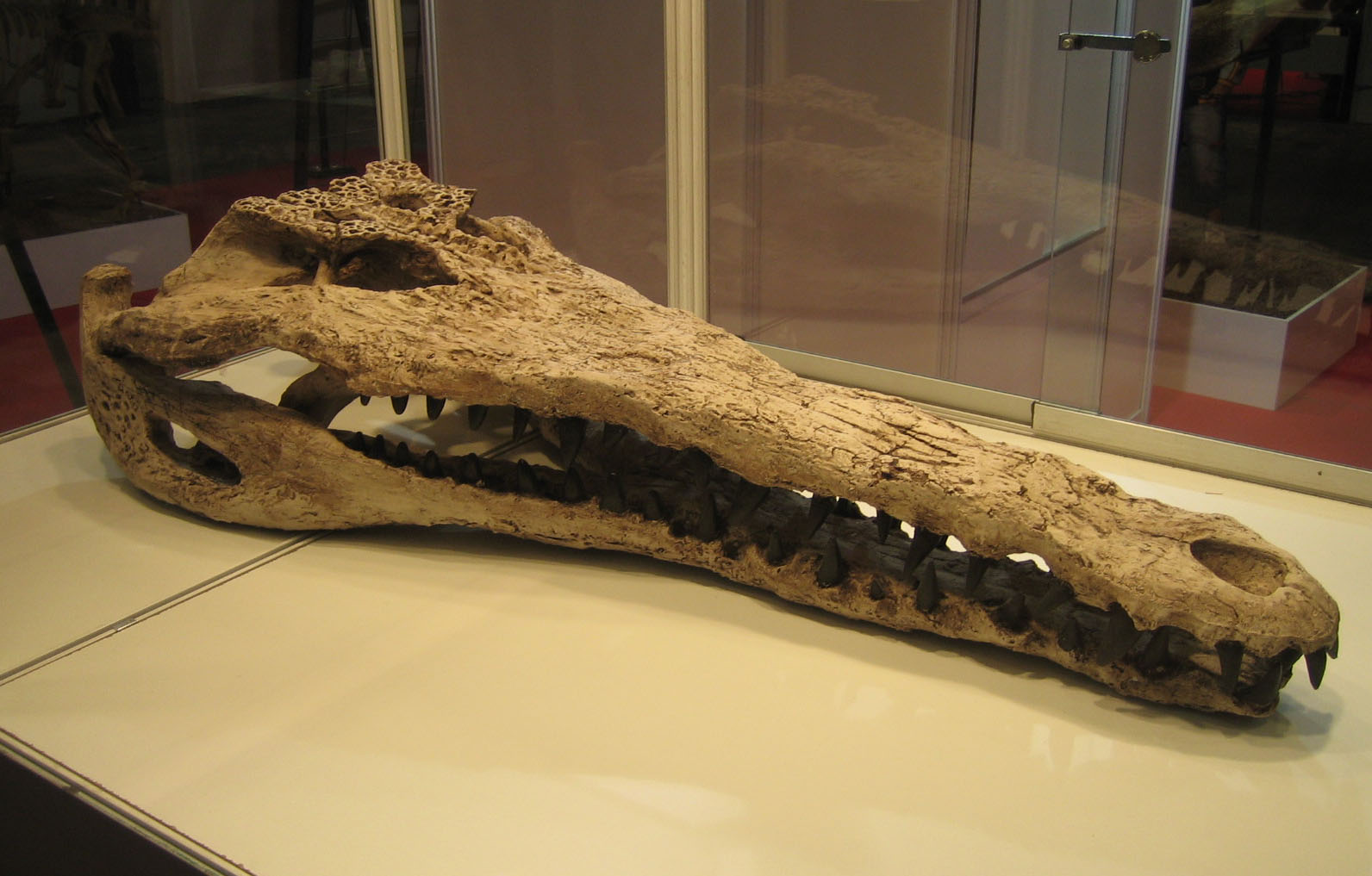
- Fossilized skull of the Miocene crocodile relative Gavialosuchus
  †Gavialosuchus
  - †Gavialosuchus americanus
- Gegania
- Gemma
- Gemophos
  - †Gemophos tinctus
- Geochelone
- †Georgiacetus
  - †Georgiacetus vogtlensis – or unidentified comparable form
- †Gigantostrea
- Ginglymostoma
- Globigerina
- Globulina
- Glossus
- Glycymeris
  - †Glycymeris americana
  - †Glycymeris decussata
- Glyptoactis
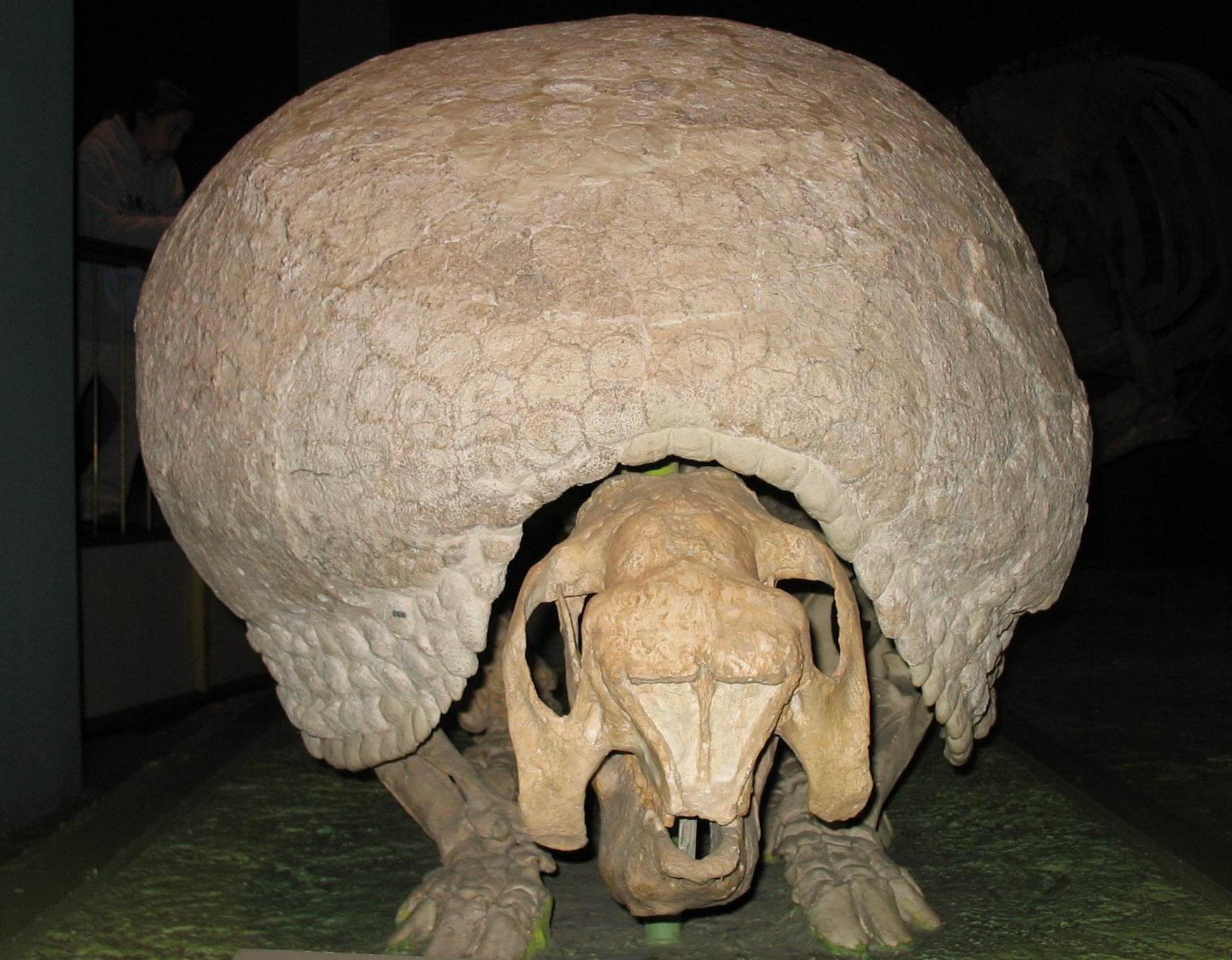
- Mounted fossilized skeleton of the Pleistocene armadillo relative Glyptotherium
  †Glyptotherium
- Gopherus
- Gymnura
- Halichoerus – or unidentified comparable form
  - †Halichoerus grypus
- †Halitherium
  - †Halitherium alleni – type locality for species
- Hastula – report made of unidentified related form or using admittedly obsolete nomenclature
- Haustator
- †Hemiauchenia
  - †Hemiauchenia macrocephala
- Hemipristis
  - †Hemipristis serra
- Here
- Hexaplex
- Hiatella
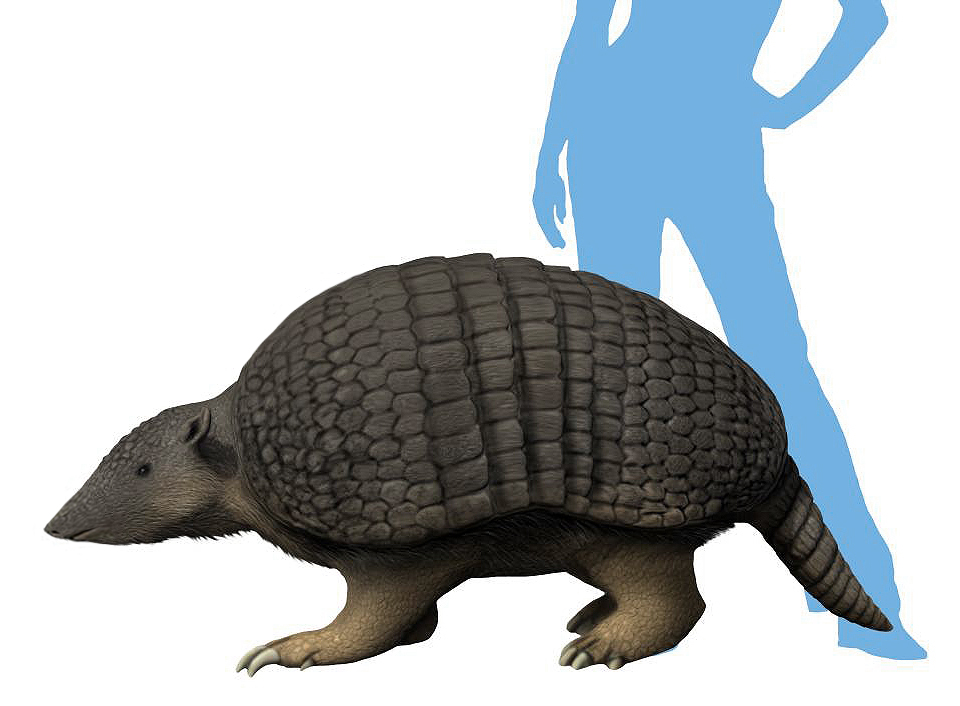
- Life restoration of the Pleistocene armadillo relative Holmesina with a human to scale
  †Holmesina
- Horologica
- Hyotissa
- †Hyposaurus
- Ilyanassa
  - †Ilyanassa obsoleta
  - †Ilyanassa trivittata
- Infundibulum
- †Ischyodus
- †Isocrania
- Isognomon
- Kinosternon
- Kurtziella
  - †Kurtziella cerina
- Laevicardium
  - †Laevicardium mortoni
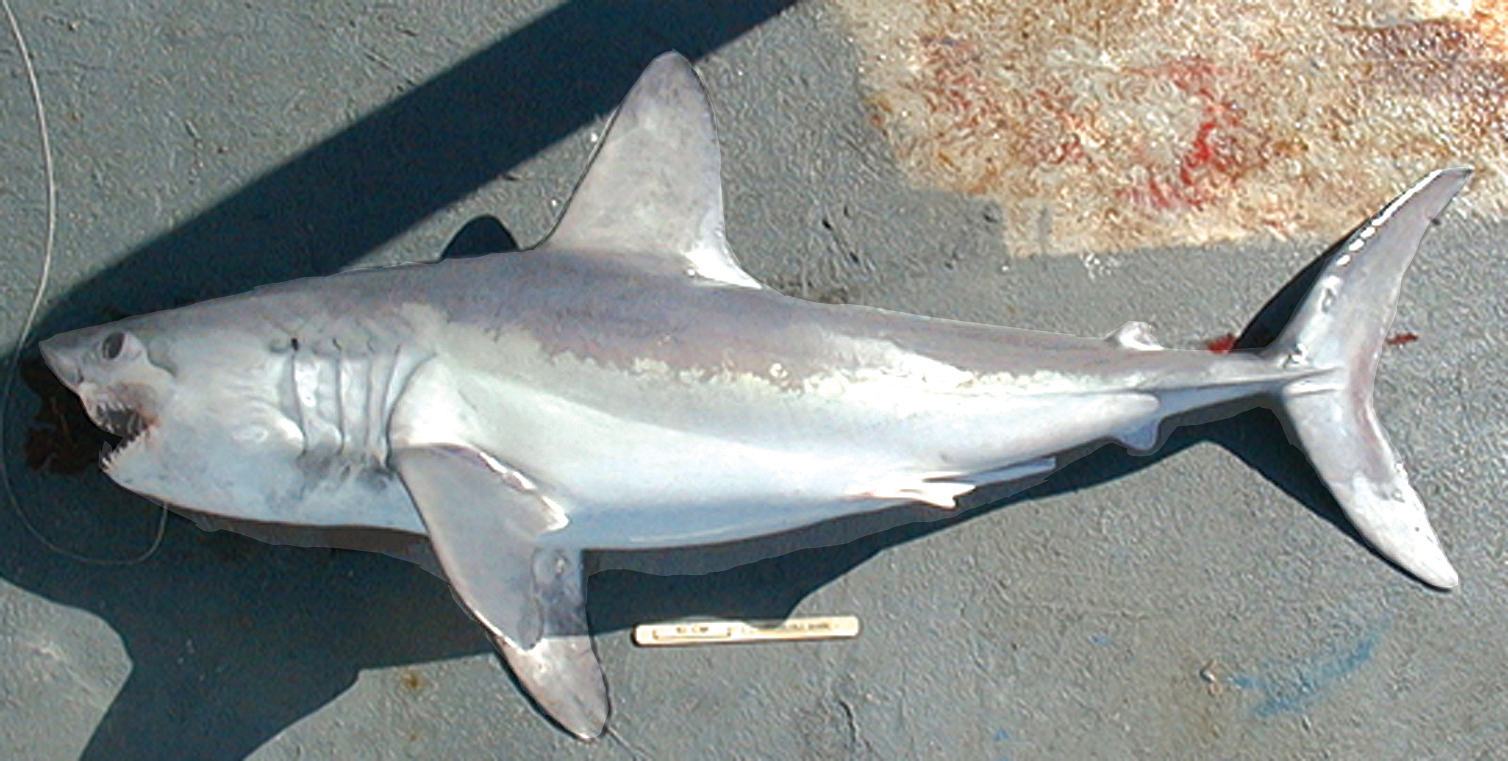
- A modern Lamna mackerel shark
  Lamna
- Latirus – tentative report
- Lima
- Limaria
- Limatula
- Linga
- †Linthia
- Liotia
- Lithophaga
- Littoraria
  - †Littoraria irrorata
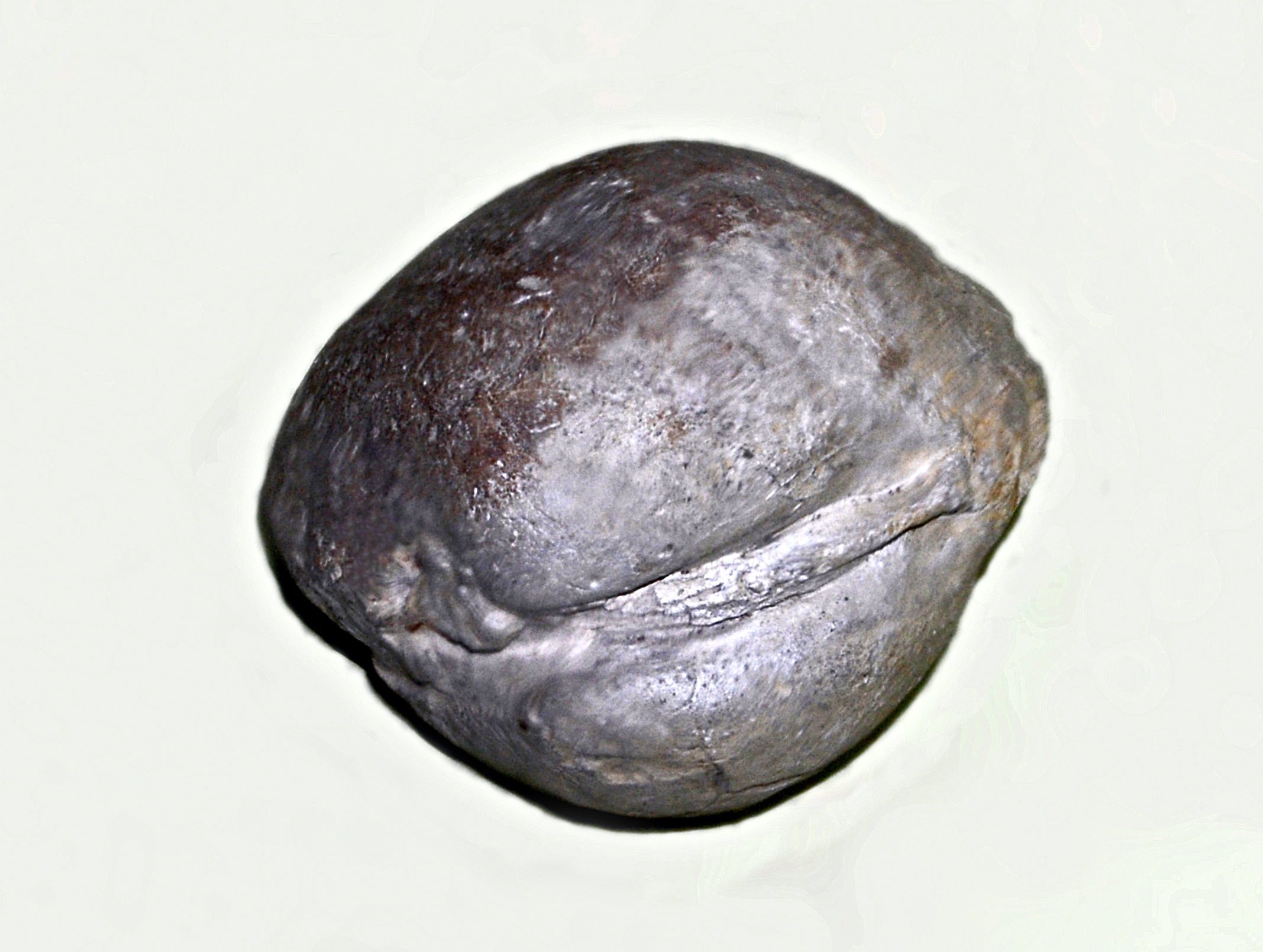
- Fossilized shell of the Devonian-modern marine bivalve Lucina
  Lucina
  - †Lucina pensylvanica
- Lunularia
- Lynx
  - †Lynx rufus
- Lyria
- Macoma
  - †Macoma balthica
  - †Macoma tenta
- Macrocallista
  - †Macrocallista maculata
  - †Macrocallista nimbosa
- Mactra
- Malaclemys
  - †Malaclemys terrapin
- †Mammut
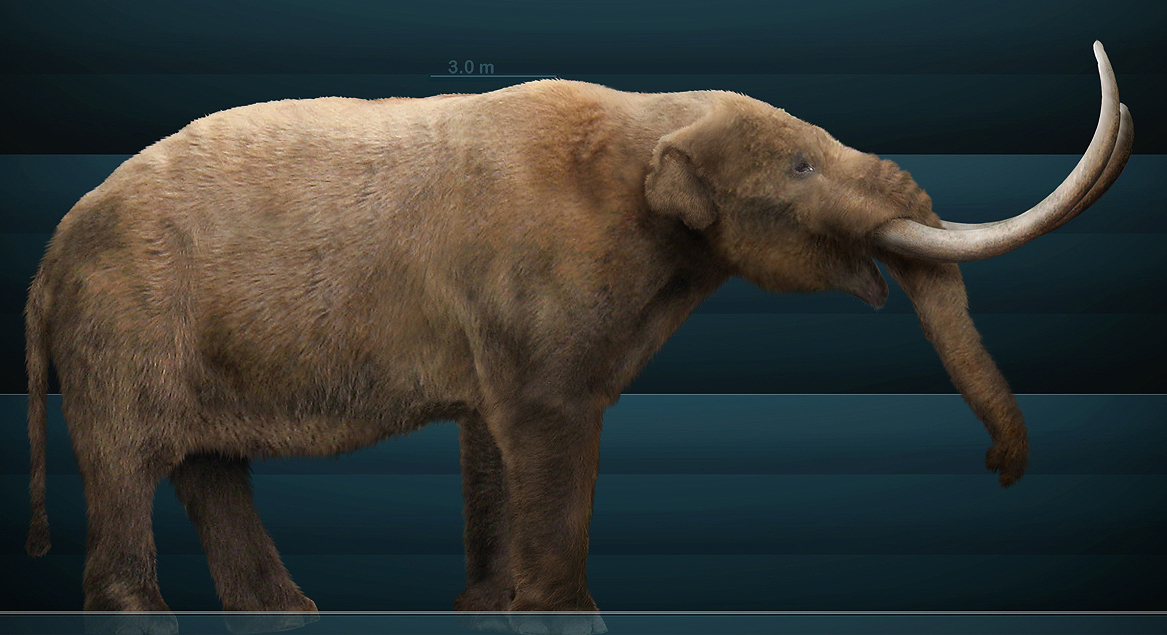
  - Restoration of a Mammut americanum, or American mastodon
    †Mammut americanum
- †Mammuthus
  - †Mammuthus columbi – or unidentified comparable form
- Manta
  - †Manta fragilis
- Maretia
- Marginella
- Martesia
- †Mathilda
- †Mauricia
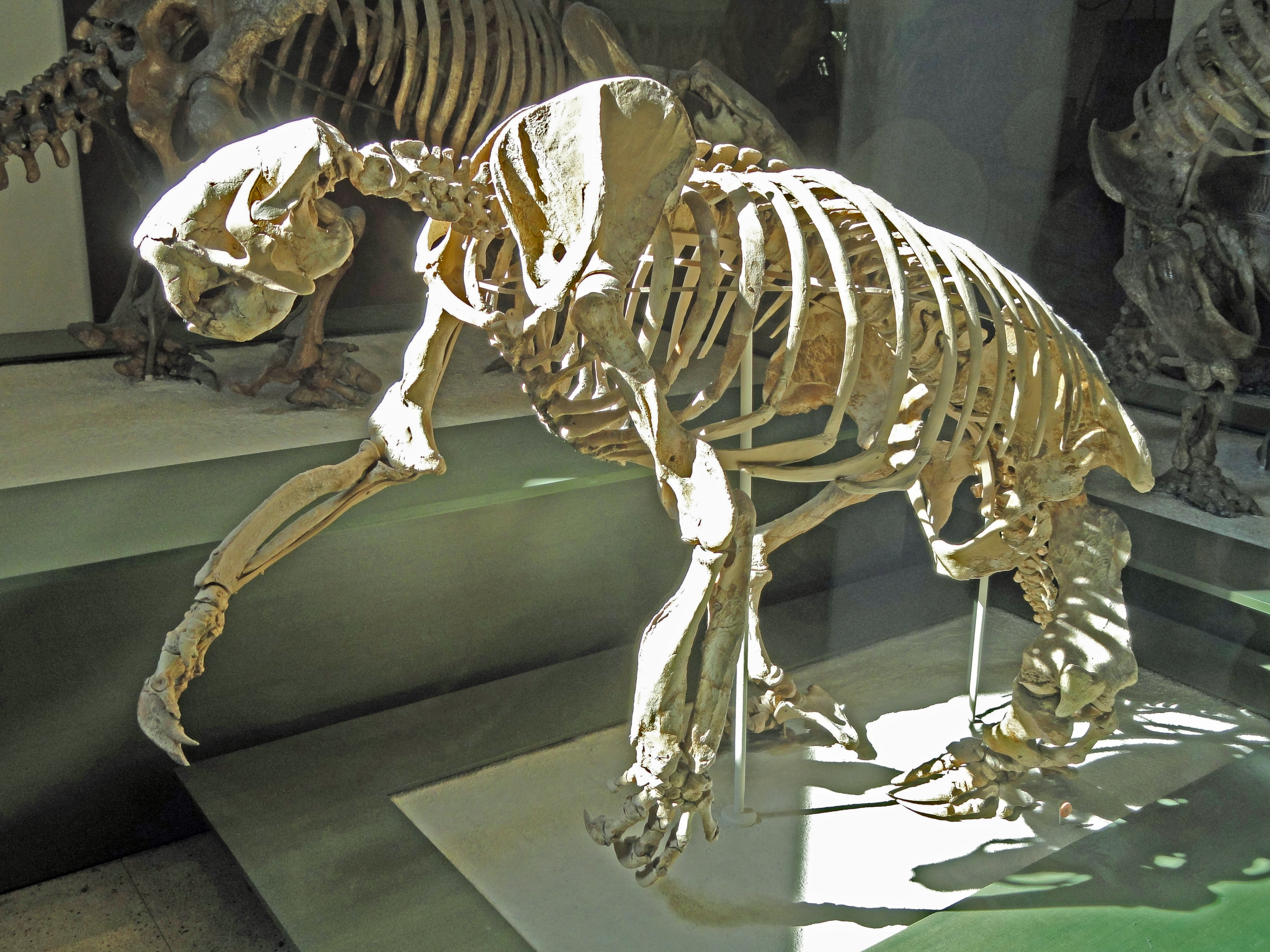
- Mounted fossilized skeleton of the Miocene-Pleistocene ground sloth Megalonyx
  †Megalonyx
  - †Megalonyx jeffersonii
- Meiocardia
- Melampus
  - †Melampus bidentatus
- Melanella
  - †Melanella conoidea
- Menippe – tentative report
- Mercenaria
  - †Mercenaria mercenaria
- Mesalia
- Mesodesma
- †Metaxytherium
- Metis – tentative report
- Microdrillia
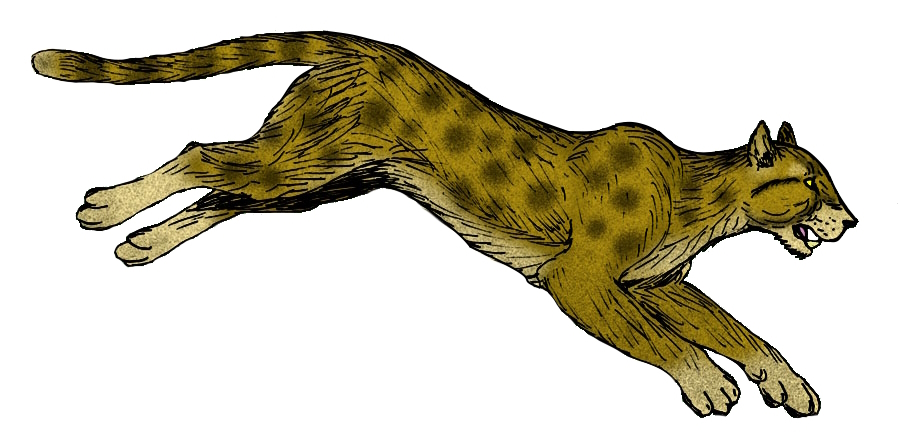
- Restoration of the Pliocene-Pleistocene Miracinonyx, or American cheetah
  †Miracinonyx
  - †Miracinonyx inexpectatus
- Mitrella
- Mobula
- Modiolus
- Mulinia
  - †Mulinia lateralis
- Murex
- Murexiella
  - †Murexiella glypta
  - †Murexiella macgintyi
- †Mya
  - †Mya arenaria
- Myliobatis
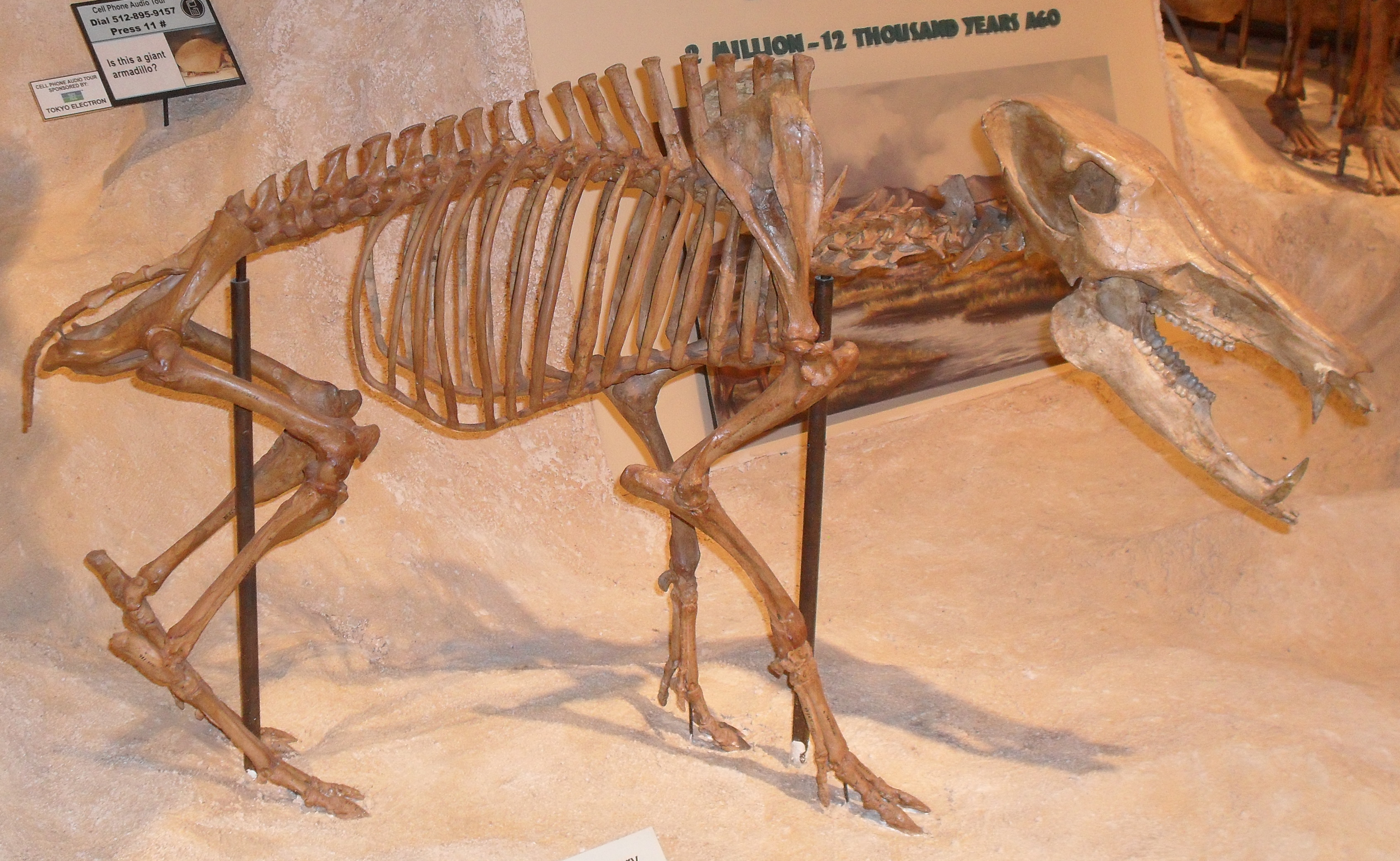
- Fossilized skeleton of the Pliocene-Holocene peccary Mylohyus
  †Mylohyus
  - †Mylohyus fossilis – or unidentified comparable form
- Mytilus
- †Nanosiren – tentative report
- Nassarius
  - †Nassarius acutus
  - †Nassarius vibex
- Natica
- Naticarius
- Nebrius
- †Neochoerus
  - †Neochoerus aesopi
  - †Neochoerus pinckneyi
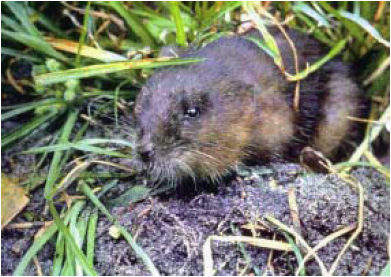
- A living Neofiber, or round-tailed muskrat
  Neofiber
  - †Neofiber alleni
- Neomonachus
  - †Neomonachus tropicalis
- Neverita
- Nodipecten
- Nucula
  - †Nucula proxima
  - †Nuculana acuta
- Oculina
- Odobenus
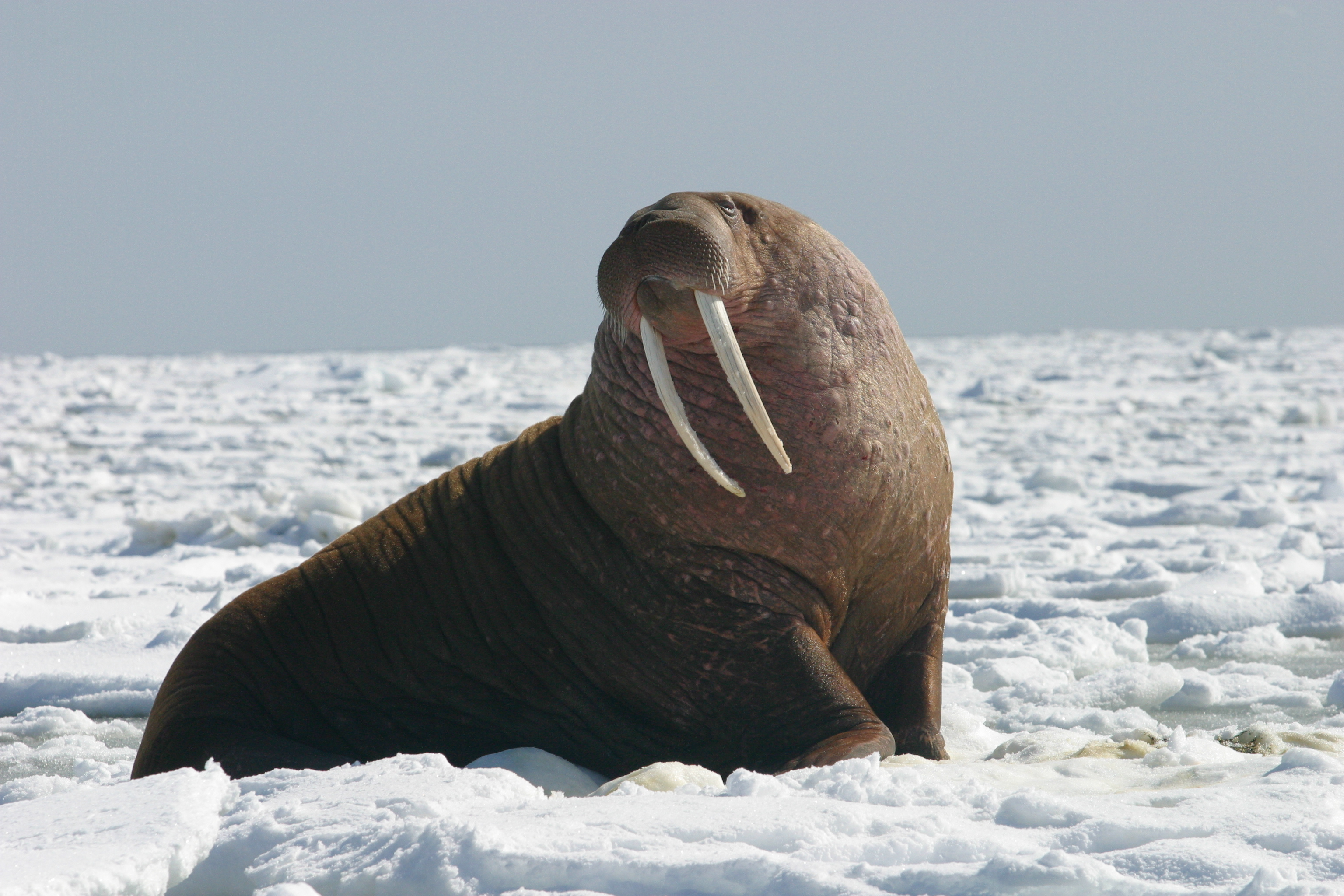
  - A living Odobenus rosmarus, or walrus
    †Odobenus rosmarus
- Odocoileus
  - †Odocoileus virginianus
- Odostomia
  - †Odostomia pedroana – or unidentified comparable form
- Oliva
  - †Oliva sayana
- Olivella
  - †Olivella mutica
- †Ontocetus
  - †Ontocetus emmonsi
- †Ophiomorpha
- †Osteopygis
- Ostrea
- †Otodus
  - Diagram illustrating the largest (grey) and most conservative (red) size estimates of the Miocene-Pliocene shark Carcharocles megalodon (sometimes Carcharodon or Otodus megalodon) with a whale shark (violet), great white shark (green), and anachronistic human (black) to scale
    †Otodus megalodon
- †Oxyrhina
- †Pachecoa
- †Pachyarmatherium
  - †Pachyarmatherium leiseyi
- †Palaeochenoides – tentative report
  - †Palaeochenoides mioceanus
- †Palaeolama
- †Palaeophis
- Pandora
- Panopea
- Panthera
  - †Panthera leo
  - †Panthera onca
- †Paramylodon
  - †Paramylodon harlani – or unidentified comparable form
- Parvanachis
  - †Parvanachis obesa
- Pecten
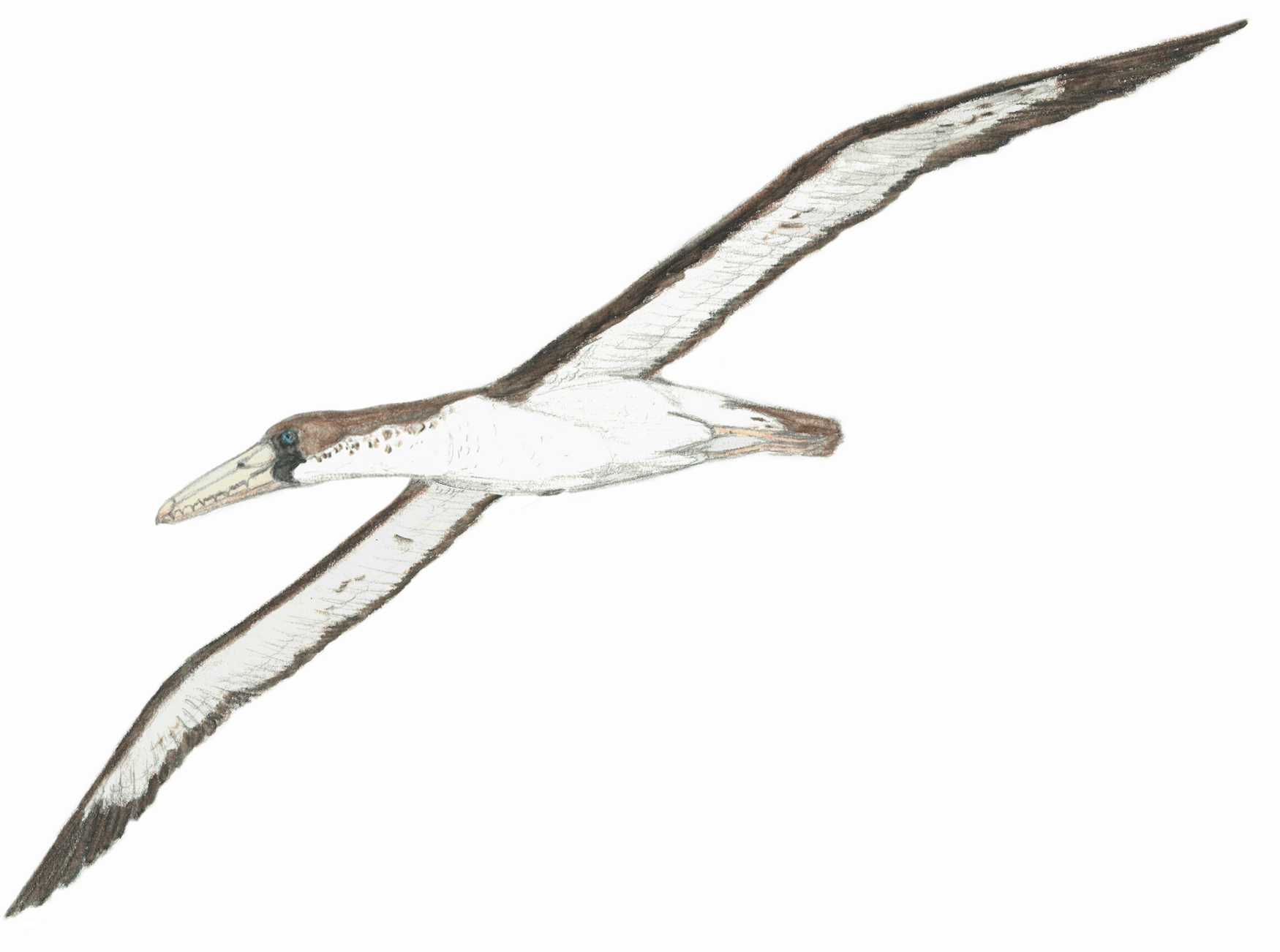
- Life restoration of the Oligocene-Pleistocene false-toothed bird Pelagornis
  †Pelagornis
  - †Pelagornis sandersi – type locality for species
- Penion
- Petaloconchus
- Petricola
  - †Petricola pholadiformis
- Phalium
- Phoca
- Pholadomya
- Pholas
- Phos
- Phyllonotus
  - †Phyllonotus pomum
- Physa
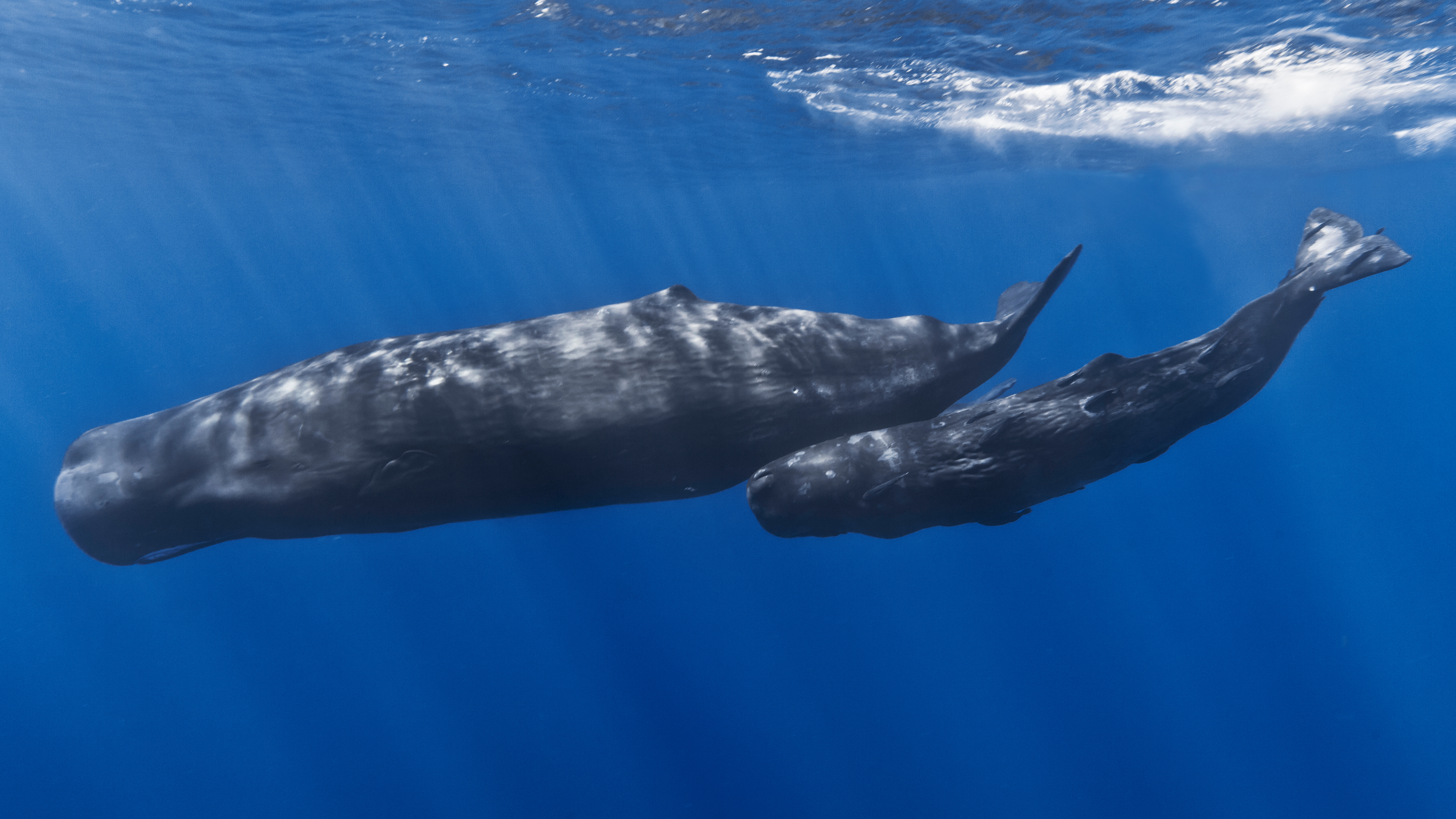
- A living Physeter macrocephalus, or sperm whale
  Physeter
- †Physogaleus
- Pinna
- Pitar
  - †Pitar morrhuanus
- Placopecten
- Planorbis
- Pleuromeris
  - †Pleuromeris tridentata
- Pleurotomaria
- Plicatula
  - †Plicatula gibbosa
- Polinices
- Polymesoda
  - †Polymesoda caroliniana
- †Prionodon
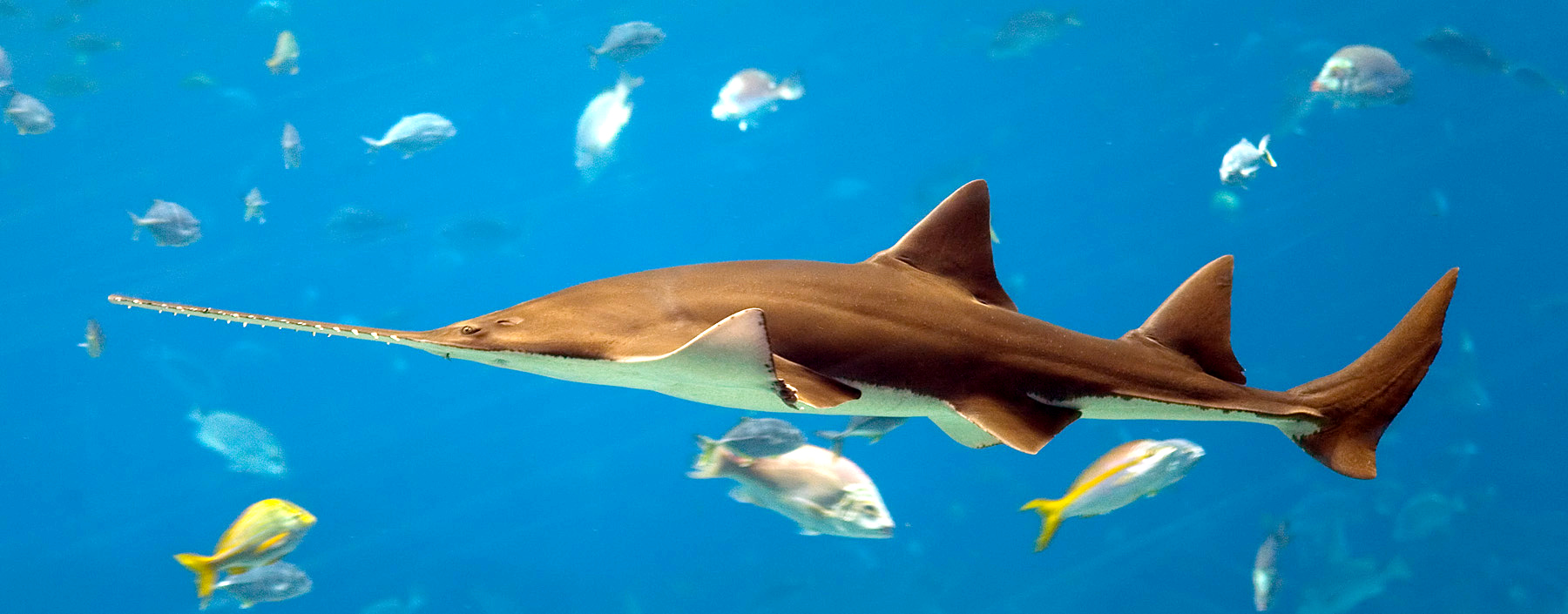
- A living Pristis sawfish
  Pristis
- †Procolpochelys
- Procyon
  - †Procyon lotor
- †Protosiren
- Prunum
  - †Prunum roscidum
- Psammechinus
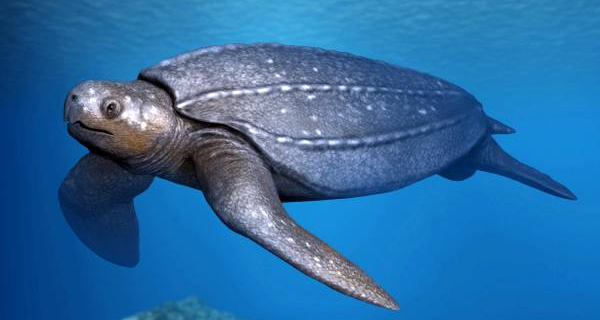
- Hypothetical restoration of the Oligocene-Pliocene sea turtle Psephophorus
  †Psephophorus
- Pseudochama
- Pseudoliva
- Pseudorca
  - †Pseudorca crassidens
- Pteria
  - †Pteria colymbus
- Pteromeris
  - †Pteromeris perplana
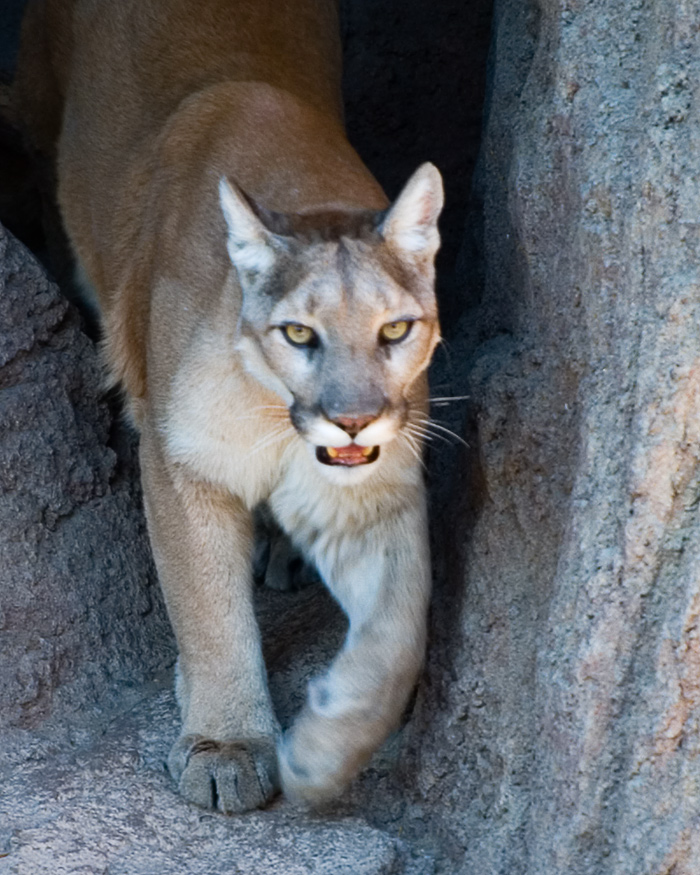
- A living Puma
  †Puma
  - †Puma concolor
- Puncturella
- Pusula
  - †Pusula pediculus
- Pycnodonte
- Pyramidella
- Pyrgo
- †Quadrans
- Quinqueloculina
- Raja
- Rangia
- Rangifer
  - †Rangifer tarandus – or unidentified comparable form
- Ranina
- Raphitoma
- Retusa
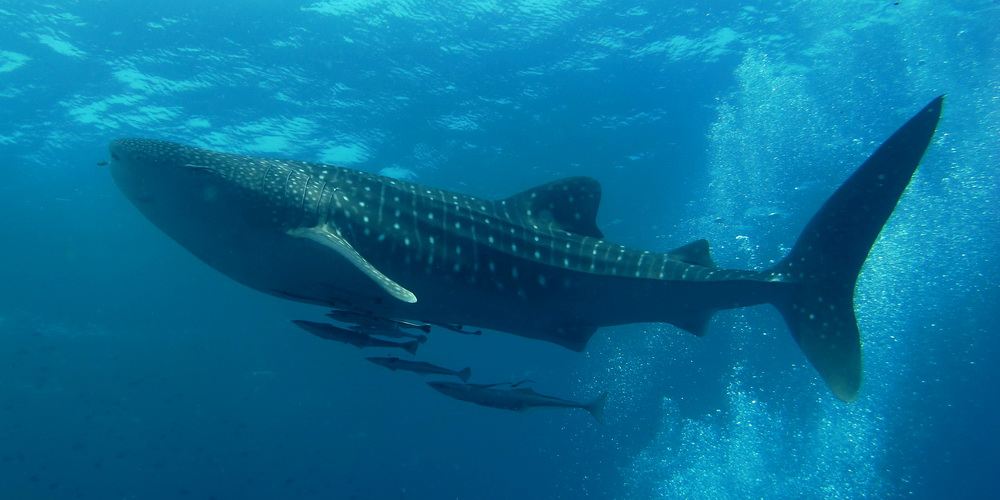
- A living Rhincodon, or whale shark
  Rhincodon
  - †Rhincodon typus – or unidentified comparable form
- Rhinobatos
- Rhinoptera
  - †Rhinoptera bonasus – or unidentified comparable form
- Rhizoprionodon
- Rhynchobatus
- Rosalina
- Rostellaria – report made of unidentified related form or using admittedly obsolete nomenclature
- Sassia
- Sayella
  - †Sayella fusca
- Scapharca
- Scaphella
- Schizoporella
  - †Schizoporella unicornis
- Sconsia
- Scyliorhinus – tentative report
- Seila
  - †Seila adamsii
- Semele
- Serpulorbis
- Sigatica
  - †Sigatica carolinensis
- Sigmodon
- Sinum
  - †Sinum perspectivum
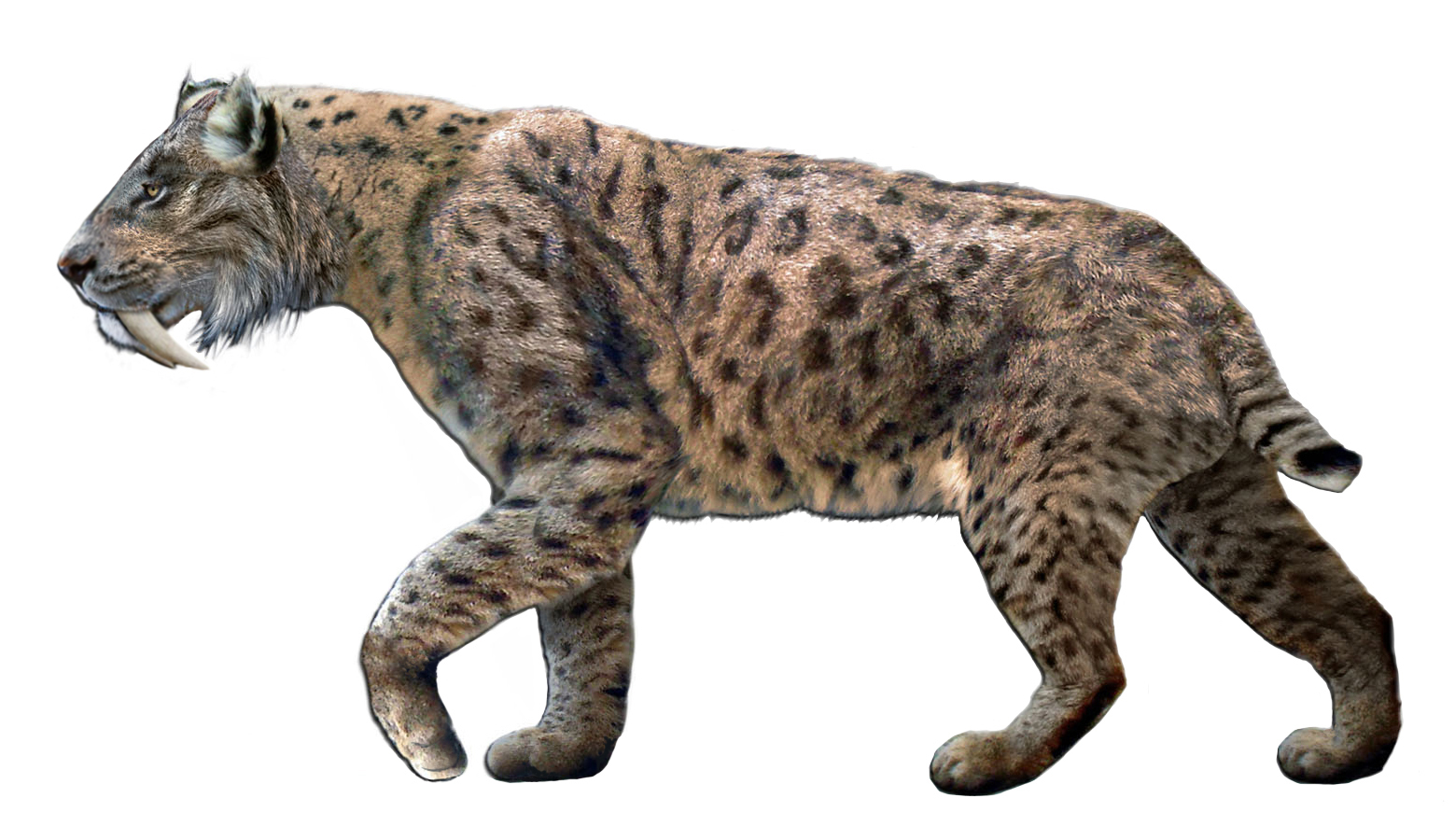
- Life restoration of the Pleistocene-Holocene saber-tooth cat Smilodon
  †Smilodon
  - †Smilodon fatalis
- Solariella
- Solemya
- Solen
  - †Solen ensis
- Solenosteira
  - †Solenosteira cancellaria
- †Spatangus
- Sphyrna
  - †Sphyrna media – or unidentified comparable form
  - †Sphyrna zygaena
- Spisula
- Spondylus
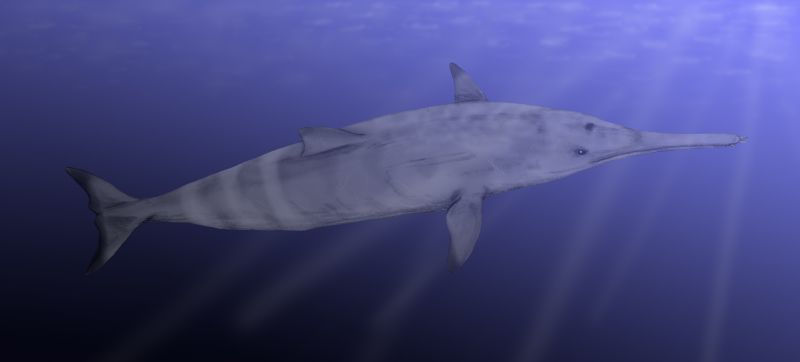
- Life restoration of the Oligocene-Miocene shark-toothed dolphin Squalodon
  †Squalodon
- Squatina
- Stewartia
- Strioterebrum
- Strombus
  - †Strombus pugilis
- Subcancilla
- Sveltella
- Sveltia
- †Syllomus
- Sylvilagus
- Tagelus
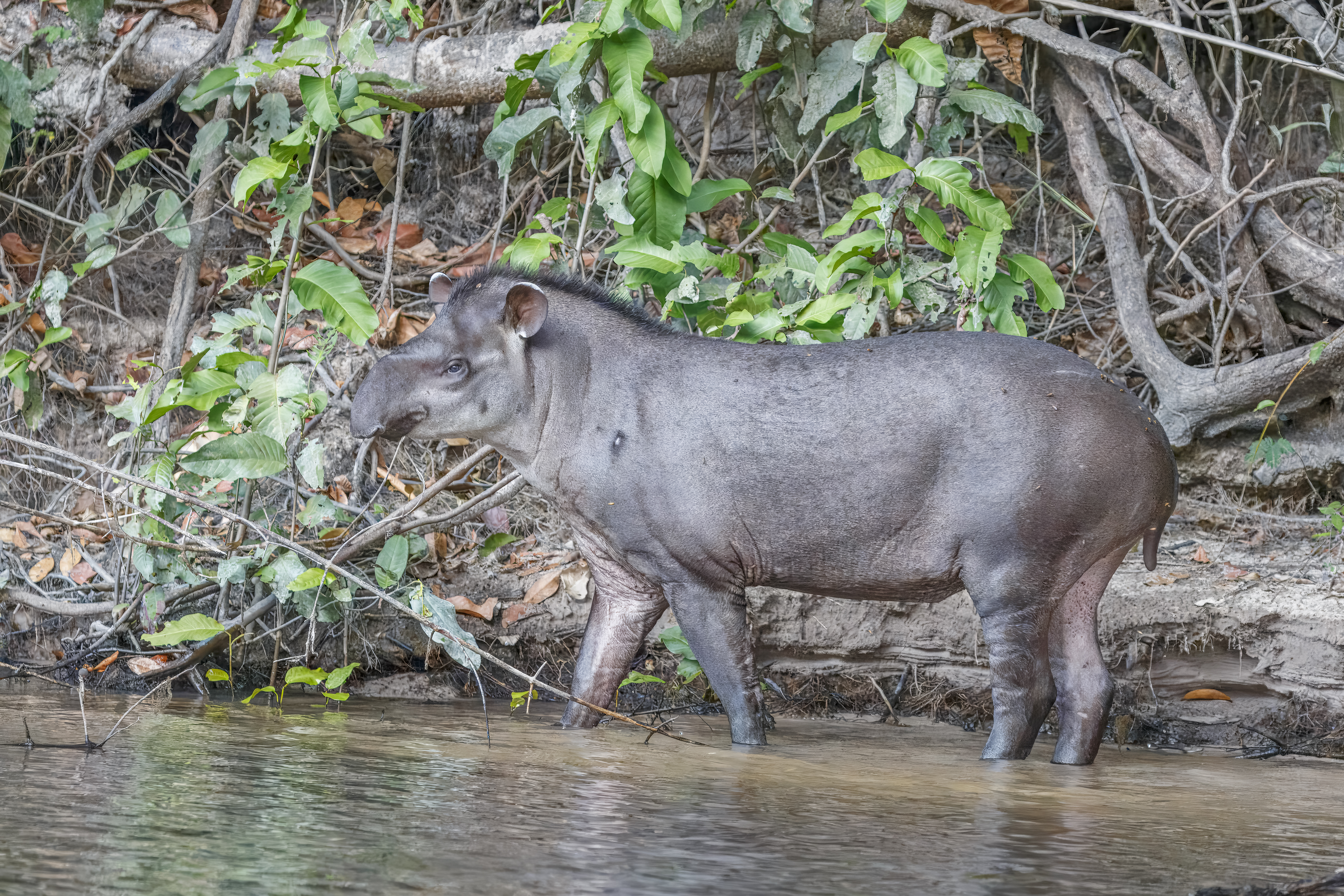
- A living Tapirus, or tapir
  Tapirus
  - †Tapirus veroensis
- Tectonatica
  - †Tectonatica pusilla
- Teinostoma
- Tellina
- Tenagodus
- Terebra
  - †Terebra protexta
- †Teredina
- Teredo
- Terrapene
  - †Terrapene carolina
- Textularia
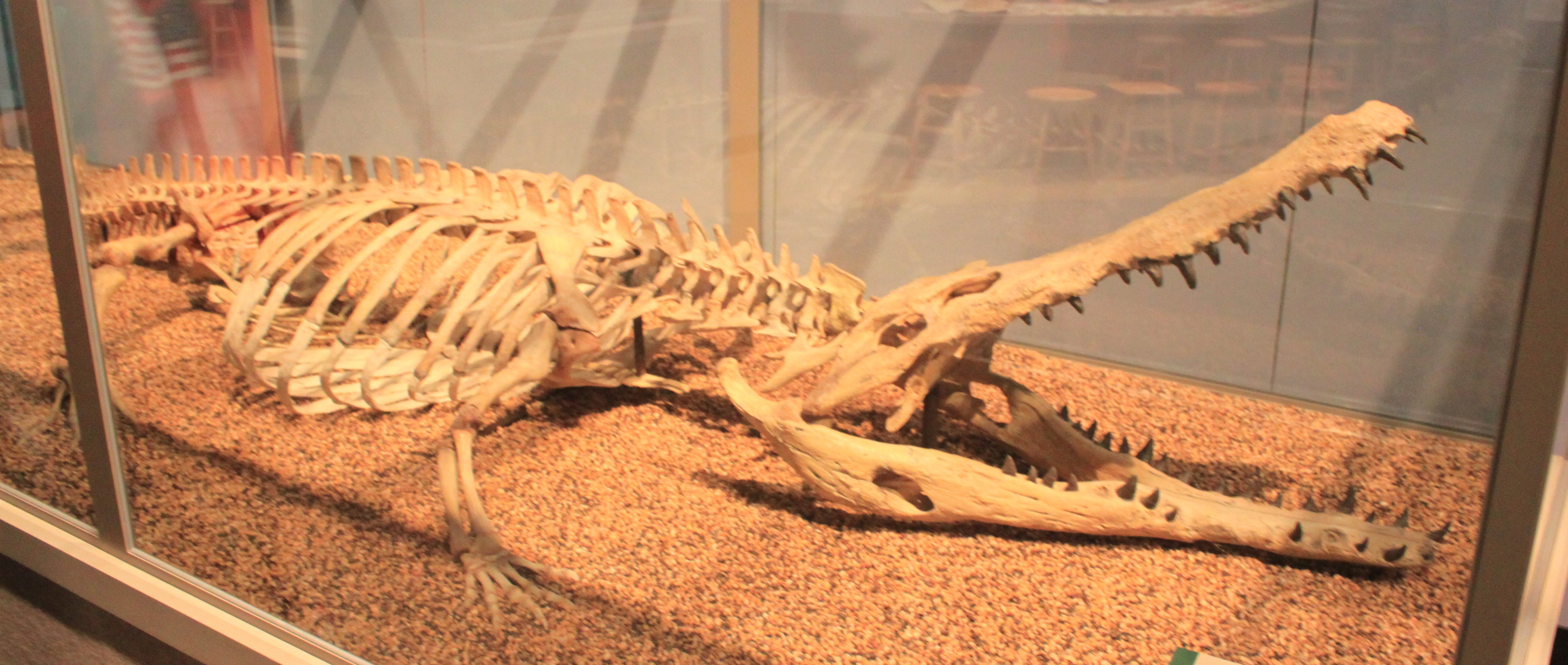
- Fossilized skeleton of the Oligocene-Miocene gavial relative Thecachampsa
  †Thecachampsa
- †Thoracosaurus
- Thracia
- Timoclea
- Trachycardium
  - †Trachycardium egmontianum
  - †Trachycardium muricatum
- Tremarctos
  - †Tremarctos floridanus
- Triakis – tentative report
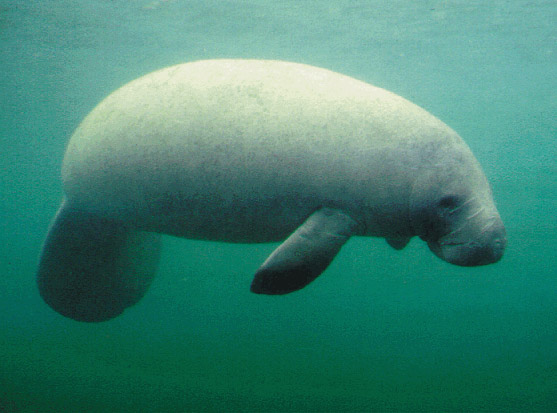
- A living Trichechus, or manatee
  Trichechus
- Trigonostoma
- †Trinacria
- Triplofusus
  - †Triplofusus giganteus
- Trivia
- Trochita
- Trochus
- †Tuba
- Tucetona
- Turbo – report made of unidentified related form or using admittedly obsolete nomenclature
- Turbonilla
  - †Turbonilla aragoni – or unidentified comparable form
  - †Turbonilla interrupta
- Turricula
- Turris
- Turritella
- Tursiops
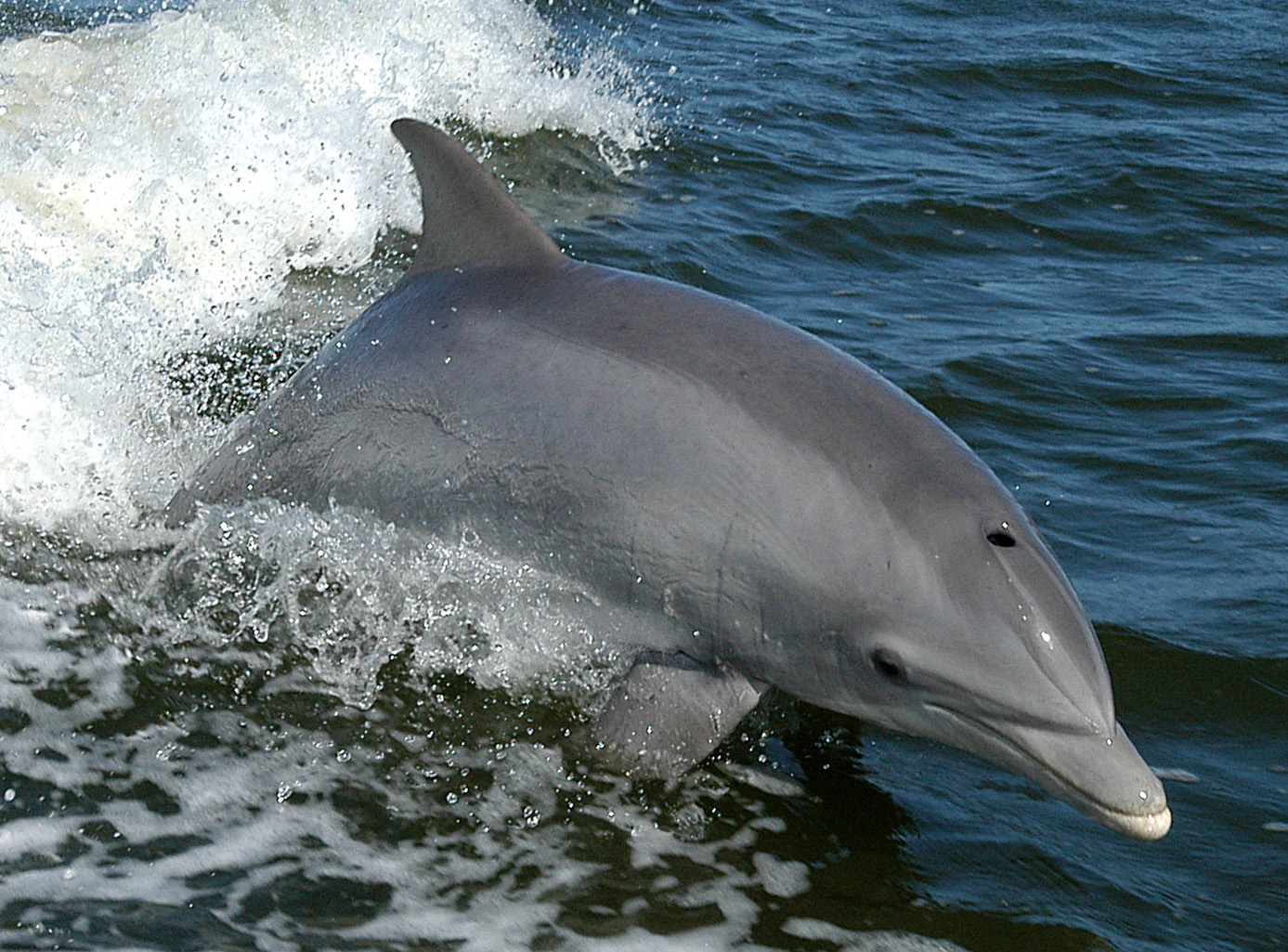
  - A living Tursiops truncatus, or common bottlenose dolphin
    †Tursiops truncatus – or unidentified comparable form
- †Tusciziphius
- †Tympanonesiotes – type locality for genus
  - †Tympanonesiotes wetmorei – type locality for species
- Typhis
- Urocyon
  - †Urocyon cinereoargenteus – or unidentified comparable form
- Urosalpinx
  - †Urosalpinx cinerea
- Venericardia
- Vermicularia
  - †Vermicularia fargoi
  - †Vermicularia spirata
- Verticordia
- Vexillum
  - †Vexillum wandoense
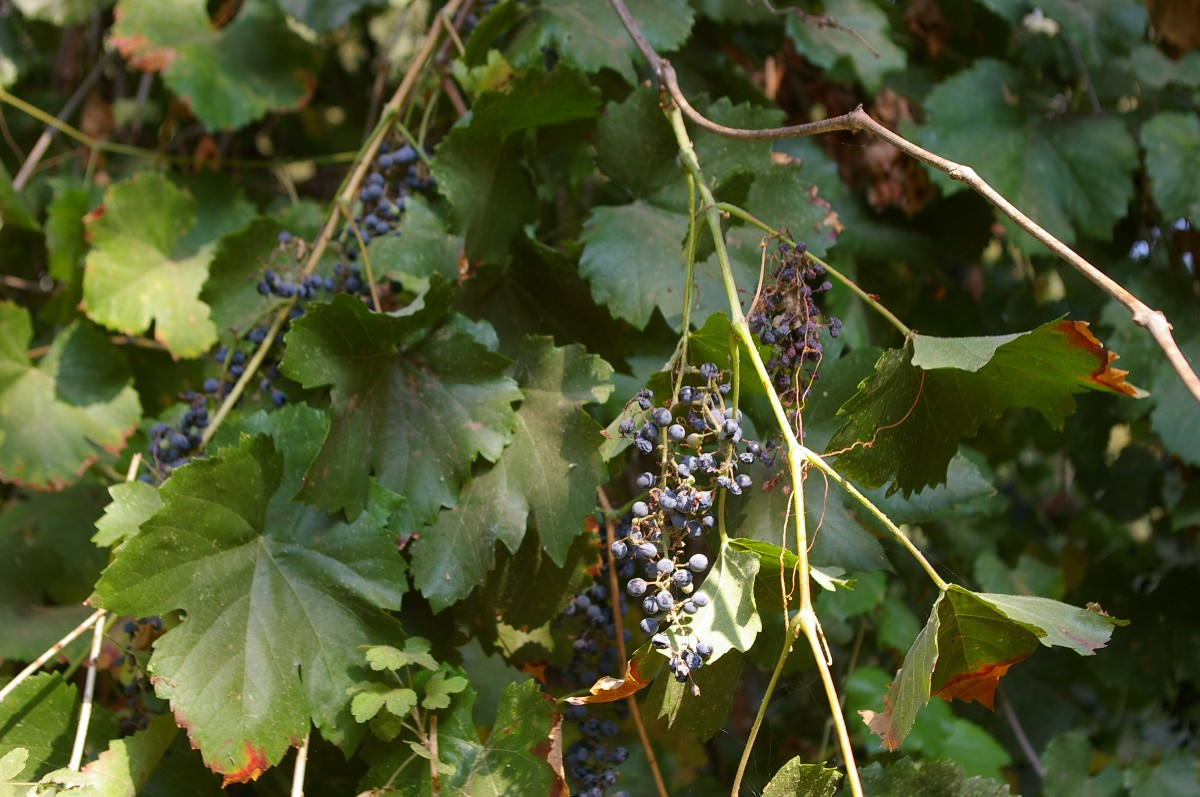
- Leaves and fruit of a living Vitis, or grapevine
  Vitis
- Voluta
- Volutifusus
- Xenophora
  - †Xenophora conchyliophora
- †Xenorophus – type locality for genus
- †Xiphiorhynchus
- †Xylotrypa
- Yoldia
  - †Yoldia limatula
