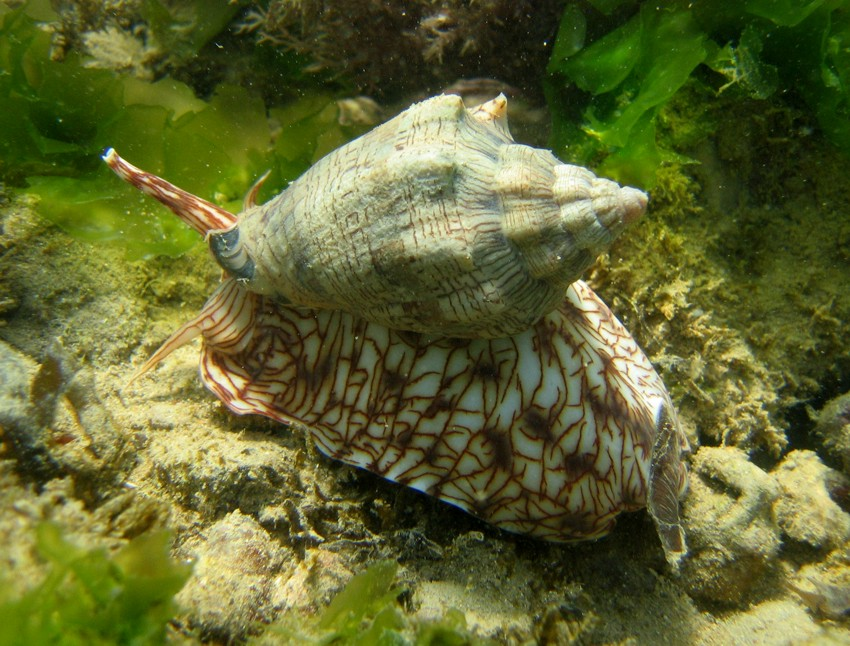
- The Hebrew volute Voluta ebraea in its natural habitat
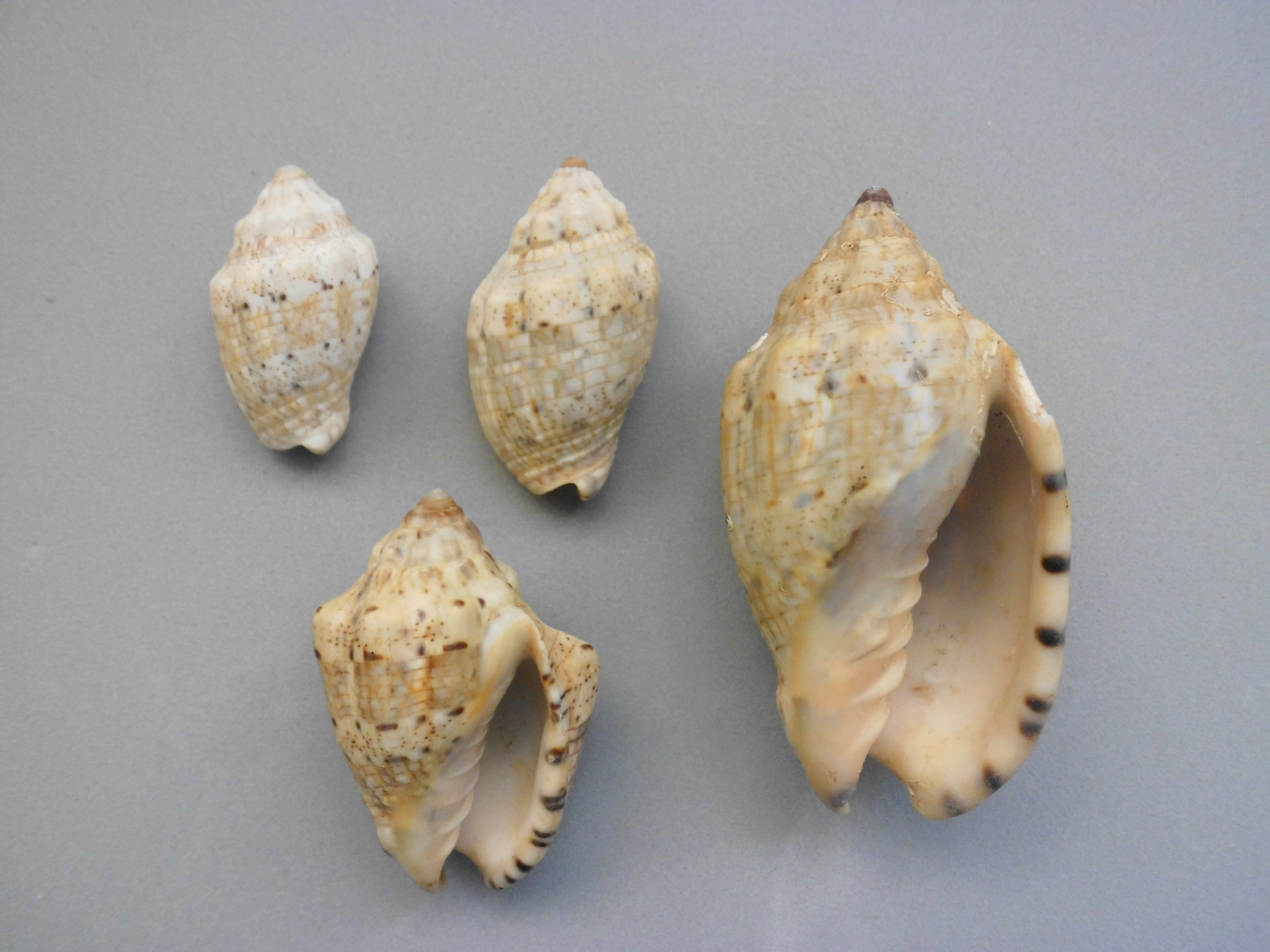
- Dorsal (left) and ventral (right) views of a shell of Voluta musica

Scientific classification
- Kingdom: Animalia
- Phylum: Mollusca
- Class: Gastropoda
- Subclass: Caenogastropoda
- Order: Neogastropoda
- Superfamily: Volutoidea
- Family: Volutidae
- Subfamily: Volutinae
- Genus: Voluta; Iredale, 1938

Type species
- Voluta musica Linnaeus, 1758

Synonyms
- Chlorosina Gray, 1858; Harpula Swainson, 1831; Musica Gray, 1847; Plejona Röding, 1798; Scaphella (Voluta) Linnaeus (unaccepted combination); Vespertilio Mörch, 1852 (invalid: junior homonym of Vespertilio Linnaeus, 1758 [Mammalia] and junior objective synonym of Scapha Gray, 1847); Volutarius Duméril, 1806; † Volutites Schlotheim, 1813 (invalid: established for fossils of Voluta to distinguish them from extant members of that taxon (Art. 20).); Volutolyria Crosse, 1877

= Voluta =

Genus of gastropods

Voluta is a genus of medium to large sea snails, marine gastropod molluscs in the family Volutidae, the volutes.

== Species ==
Species in the genus Voluta include:

- † Voluta ambigua (Solander in Brander, 1766)
- Voluta demarcoi Olsson, 1965
- Voluta ebraea Linnaeus, 1758
- Voluta ernesti (Petuch, 1990)
- Voluta garciai (Petuch, 1981)
- † Voluta hamiltonensis Pritchard, 1898
- Voluta harasewychi (Petuch, 1987)
- Voluta hilli (Petuch, 1987)
- † Voluta hornesi Deshayes, 1865
- † Voluta intusdentata Cossmann, 1889
- † Voluta junghuhni K. Martin, 1879
- Voluta kotorai (Petuch, 1981)
- † Voluta mitrata Deshayes, 1835
- † Voluta mitreola Lamarck, 1803
- Voluta morrisoni (Petuch, 1980)
- Voluta musica Linnaeus, 1758
- † Voluta musicalis Lamarck, 1803
- Voluta polypleura Crosse, 1876
- † Voluta quinqueplicata Bayan, 1870
- Voluta retemirabilis (Petuch, 1981)
- Voluta sunderlandi (Petuch, 1987)
- † Voluta supplicata Traub, 1981
- Voluta virescens Lightfoot, 1786
- † Voluta wateleti Deshayes, 1865

Taxon inquirendum

- Voluta cumingii Broderip, 1832

Nomen dubium

- † Voluta corrugata Hutton, 1873

Subgenera brought into synonymy

- Voluta (Callipara): synonym of Callipara Gray, 1847
- Voluta (Fulgoraria) Schumacher, 1817: synonym of Fulgoraria Schumacher, 1817
- Voluta (Psephaea) Crosse, 1871: synonym of Fulgoraria (Psephaea) Crosse, 1871

== Synonyms ==
- Voluta ambigua Lahille, 1895: synonym of Odontocymbiola magellanica (Gmelin, 1791)
- Voluta ancilla [Lightfoot], 1786 : synonym of Adelomelon ancilla ([Lightfoot], 1786) (original combination)
- Voluta angulata (Swainson, 1821): synonym of Zidona dufresnei (Donovan, 1823)
- Voluta colocynthis Dillwyn, 1817: synonym of Pachycymbiola brasiliana (Lamarck, 1811)
- Voluta coniformis Cox, 1871: synonym of Volutoconus coniformis (Cox, 1871)
- Voluta cymbiola Gmelin, 1791: synonym of Cymbiola (Cymbiola) cymbiola (Gmelin, 1791)
- Voluta dohrni G.B. Sowerby III, 1903: synonym of Scaphella dohrni (G.B. Sowerby III, 1903)
- Voluta fulgetrum G. B. Sowerby I, 1825: synonym of Ericusa fulgetrum (G. B. Sowerby I, 1825)
- Voluta fusiformis Kiener, 1839: synonym of Adelomelon beckii (Broderip, 1836)
- Voluta heteroclita Montagu, 1808: synonym of Blauneria heteroclita (Montagu, 1808)
- Voluta hiatula Gmelin, 1791: synonym of Agaronia hiatula (Gmelin, 1791)
- Voluta junonia Lamarck, 1804: synonym of Scaphella junonia (Lamarck, 1804)
- Voluta kreuslerae Angas, 1865: synonym of Notovoluta kreuslerae (Angas, 1865)
- Voluta lacertina Petuch, 1990: synonym of Voluta virescens virescens Lightfoot, 1786
- Voluta lapponica Linnaeus, 1767: synonym of Harpulina lapponica (Linnaeus, 1767)
- Voluta magellanica Chemnitz, 1788: synonym of Adelomelon ancilla (Lightfoot, 1786)
- Voluta magellanica Gmelin, 1791: synonym of Odontocymbiola magellanica (Gmelin, 1791)
- Voluta mammilla G.B. Sowerby I, 1844: synonym of Livonia mammilla (G.B. Sowerby I, 1844)
- Voluta nivosa Lamarck, 1804: synonym of Cymbiola nivosa (Lamarck, 1804)
- Voluta nobilis [Lightfoot], 1786: synonym of Cymbiola nobilis ([Lightfoot], 1786)
- Voluta oviformis Lahille, 1895: synonym of Pachycymbiola ferussacii (Donovan, 1824)
- Voluta paradoxa Lahille, 1895: synonym of Odontocymbiola magellanica (Gmelin, 1791)
- Voluta proboscidalis Lamarck, 1811: synonym of Cymbium glans (Gmelin, 1791)
- Voluta rhinoceros Gmelin, 1791: synonym of Vasum rhinoceros (Gmelin, 1791)
- † Voluta showalteri Aldrich, 1886: synonym of † Euroscaphella showalteri (Aldrich, 1886)
- Voluta tuberculata Swainson, 1821: synonym of Odontocymbiola magellanica (Gmelin, 1791)
- Voluta vespertilio Linnaeus, 1758: synonym of Cymbiola vespertilio (Linnaeus, 1758)
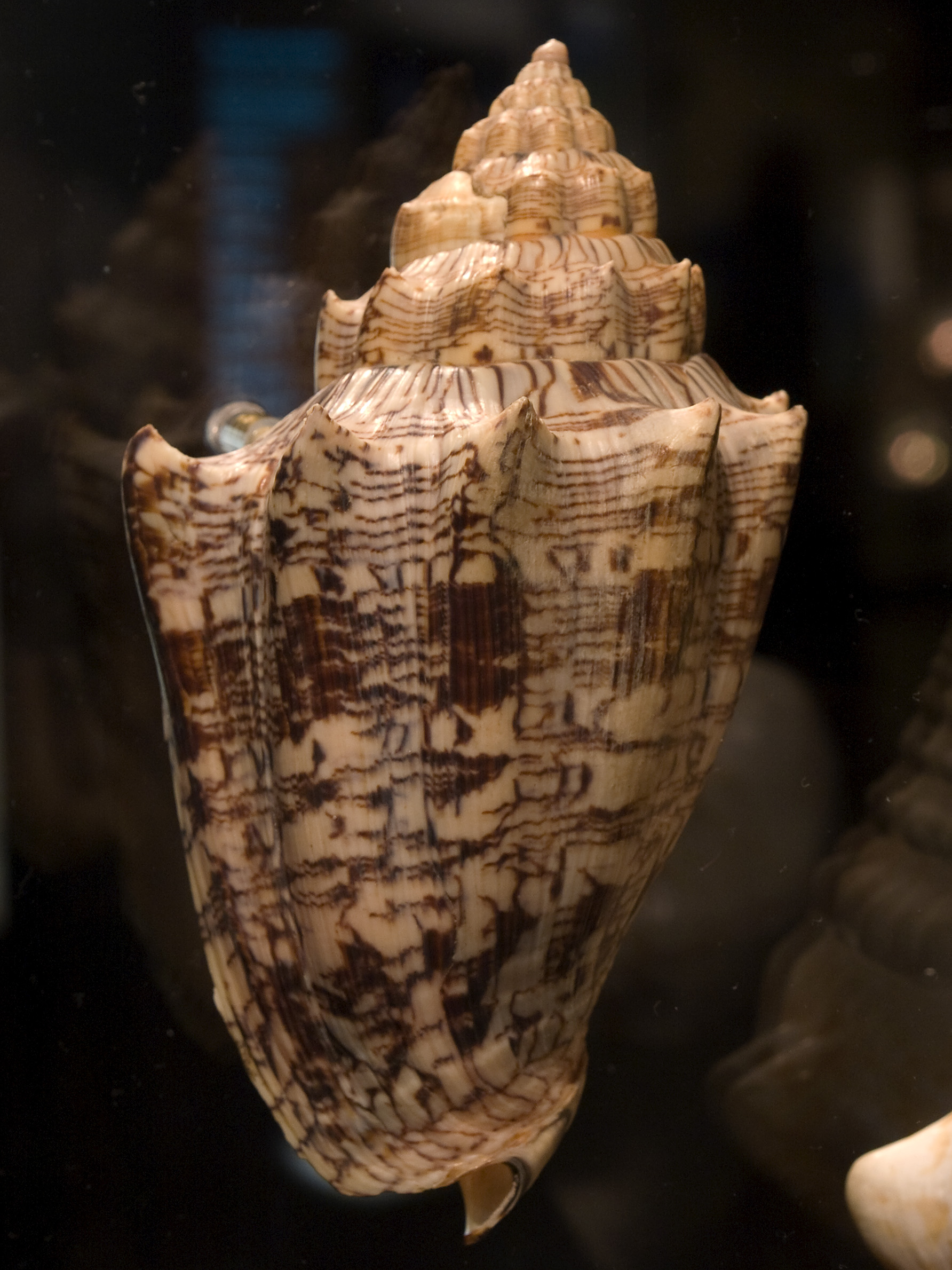
A shell of the Hebrew volute, Voluta ebraea

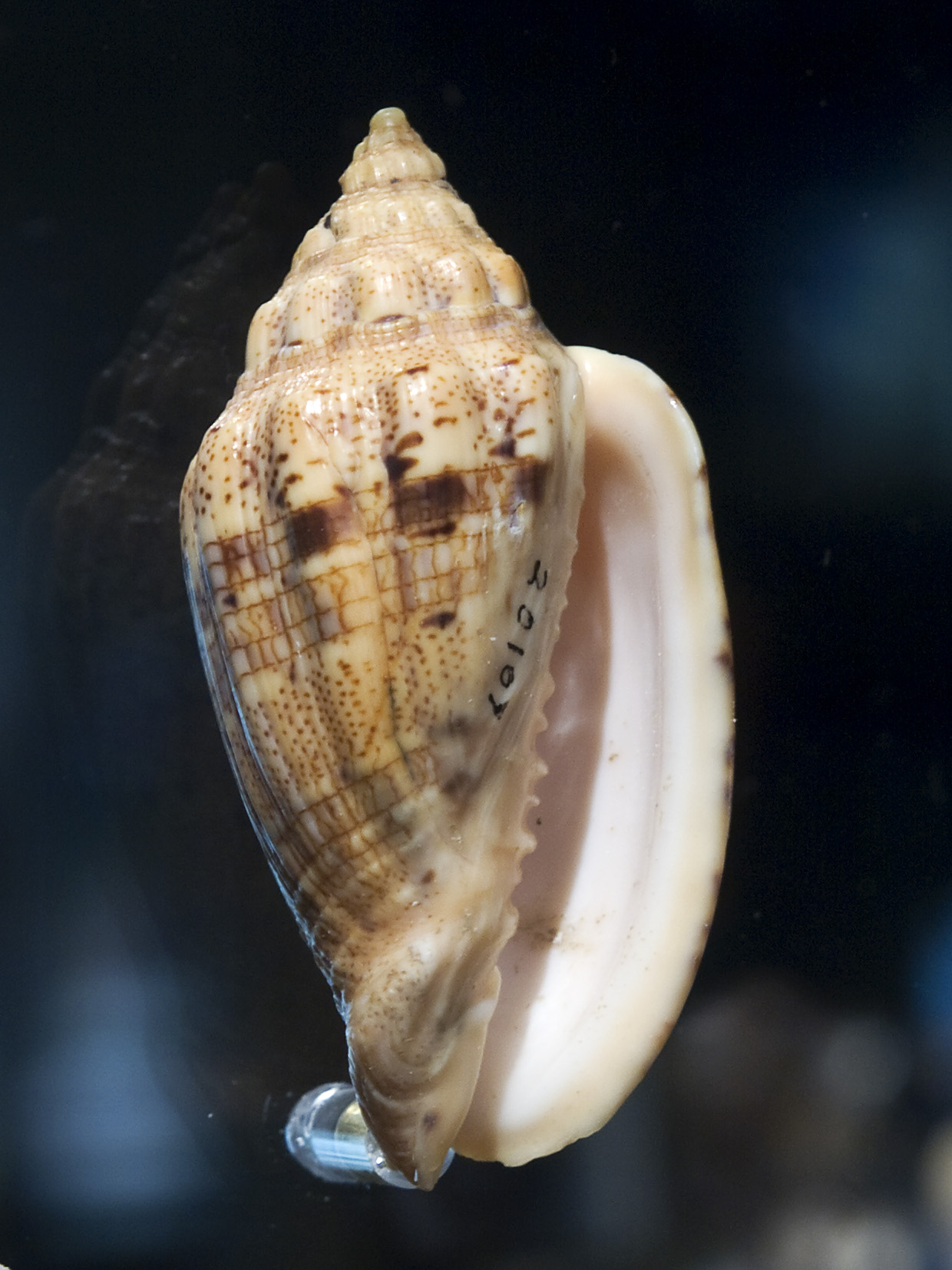
A shell of the De Marcoi's volute, Voluta polypleura

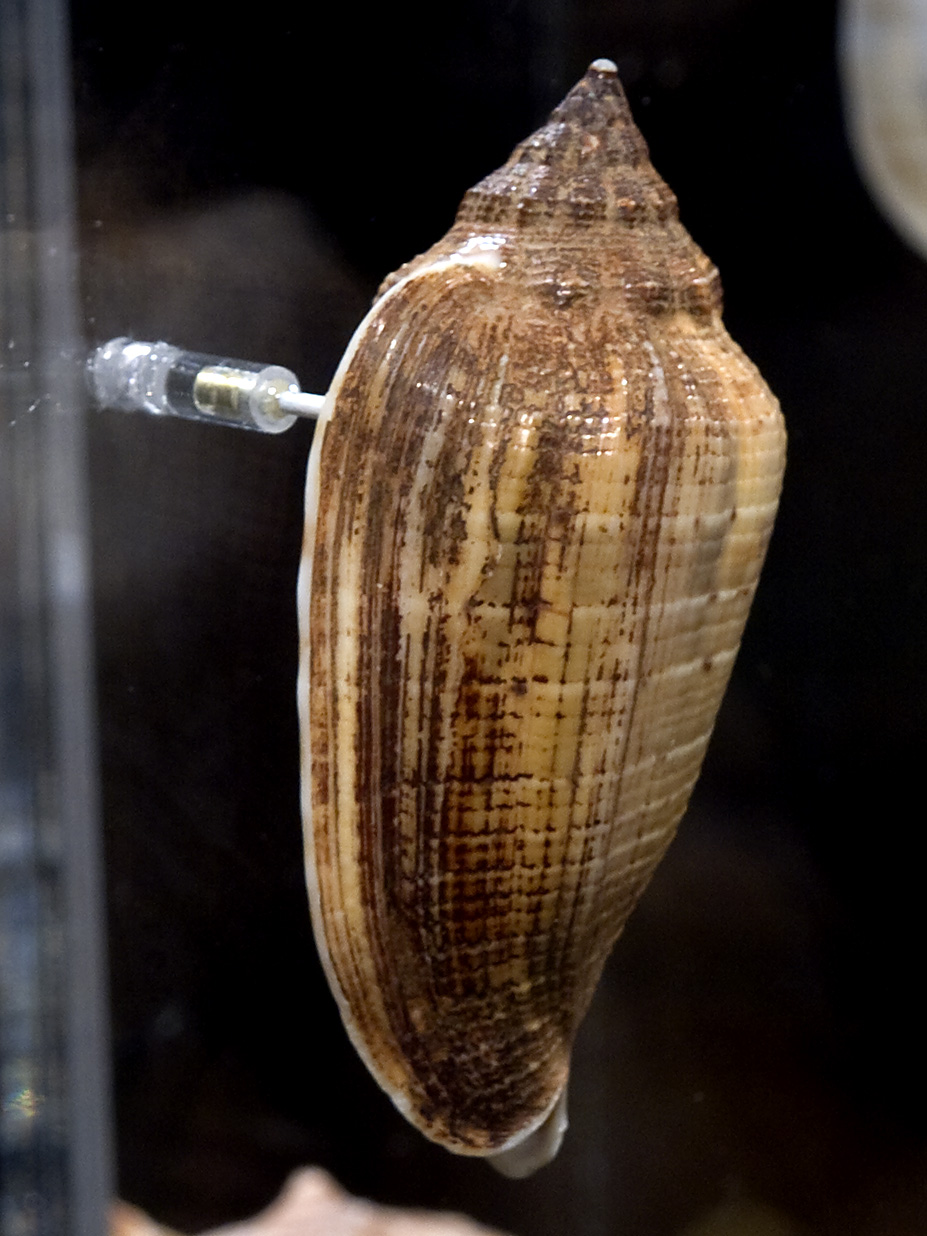
A shell of the green music volute, Voluta virescens
