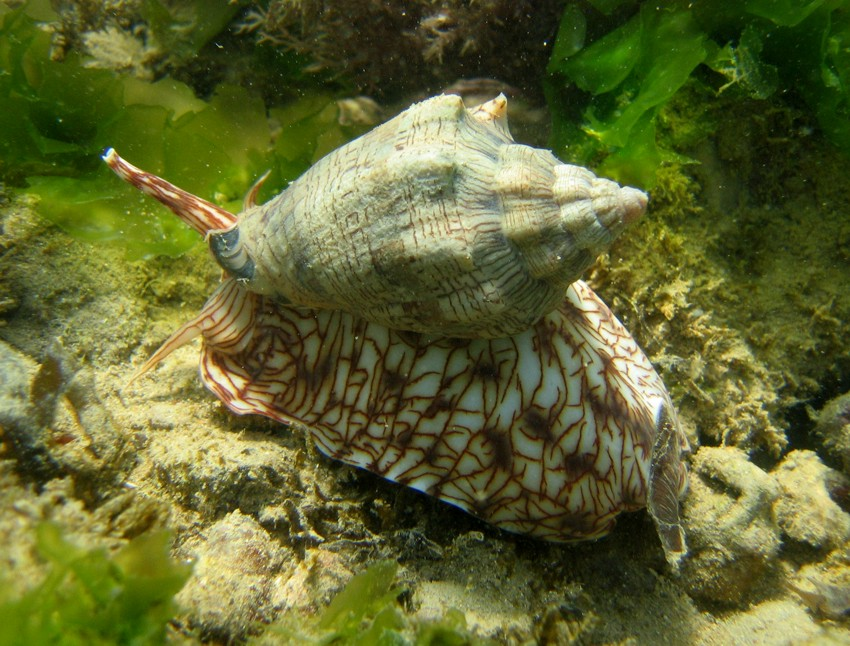
- The Hebrew volute in its natural habitat

Scientific classification
- Kingdom: Animalia
- Phylum: Mollusca
- Class: Gastropoda
- Subclass: Caenogastropoda
- Order: Neogastropoda
- Family: Volutidae
- Genus: Voluta
- Species: V. ebraea

Binomial name
- Voluta ebraea Linnaeus, 1758

Synonyms
- Voluta hebraea Born, 1778; Voluta chlorosina Lamarck, 1811; Voluta thevenini T. Cossignani & Allary, 2024; Voluta turbinata Kiener, 1839

= Voluta ebraea =

Species of gastropod

Voluta ebraea, commonly known as the Hebrew volute, is a species of medium-sized carnivorous sea snail, a marine gastropod mollusk in the family Volutidae, the volutes. It is endemic to the northern and northeastern coasts of Brazil, and inhabits the littoral zone in a variety of substrates, including sandy bottoms, coral reefs, and rocky areas from shallow waters to depths of up to 70 meters. It is known for its robust, cream-colored shell marked with reddish-brown patterns said to resemble Hebrew script.

V. ebraea preys primarily on bivalves such as Dallocardia muricata, as well as other gastropods. It is dioecious and exhibits sexual dimorphism, with females typically having a broader shell than males. Reproduction involves laying flattened, circular egg capsules, usually on the calcareous green alga Udotea occidentalis or on broken shells, yielding a small number of well-developed juveniles.

The ornate shell of V. ebraea has made it a target of the ornamental shell trade, and its meat is consumed by some coastal communities, leading to population declines in certain regions. It is also affected by imposex, a condition caused by marine pollution, particularly tributyltin (TBT) from ship antifouling paints.

== Taxonomy and etymology ==
Voluta ebraea was first described in 1758 by the Swedish naturalist Carl Linnaeus, the founder of modern taxonomy and the system of binomial nomenclature. The species belongs to the family Volutidae, a group of carnivorous marine snails known for their very variable, often colorful and elaborately patterned shells. The scientific name ebraea comes from Latin, where ebraea is the feminine form of ebraeus, meaning "Hebrew". This is likely the source of the common name "Hebrew volute", rather than vice versa. Some authors have suggested that this name refers to the reddish-brown markings on the shell, which are said to resemble Hebrew script. However, this interpretation is not universally accepted and may be speculative.

== Description ==
=== Shell ===
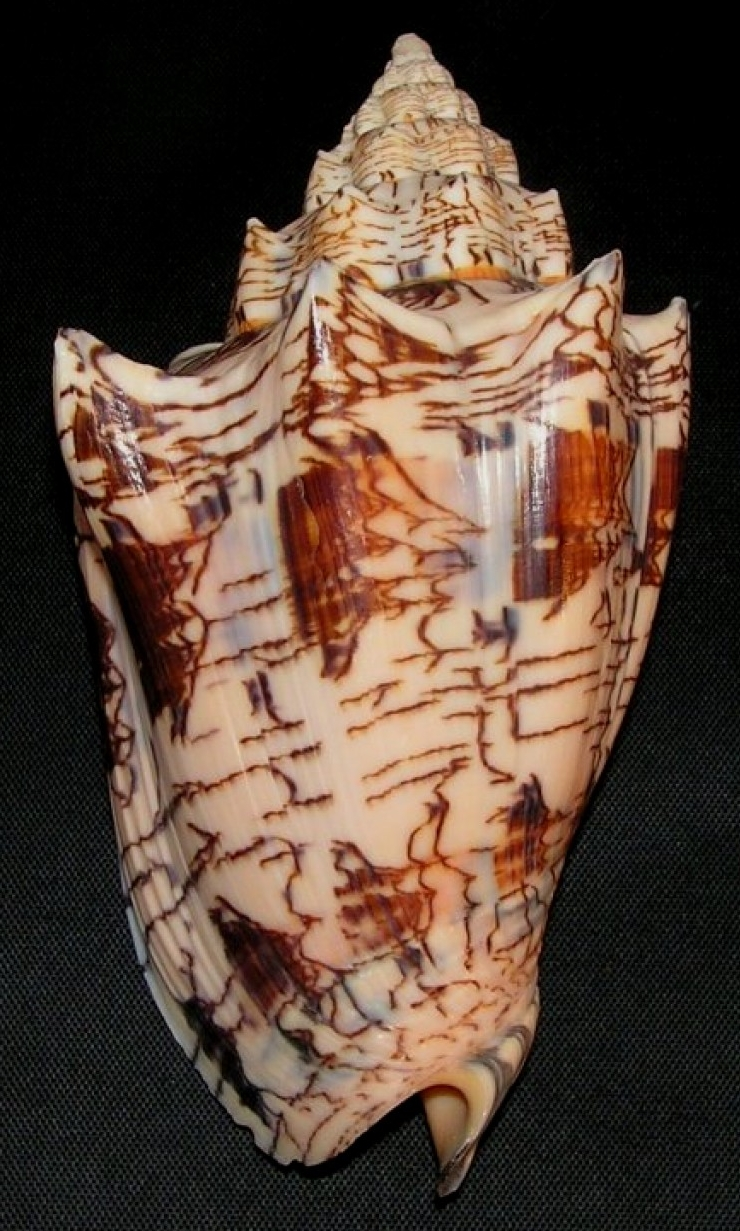
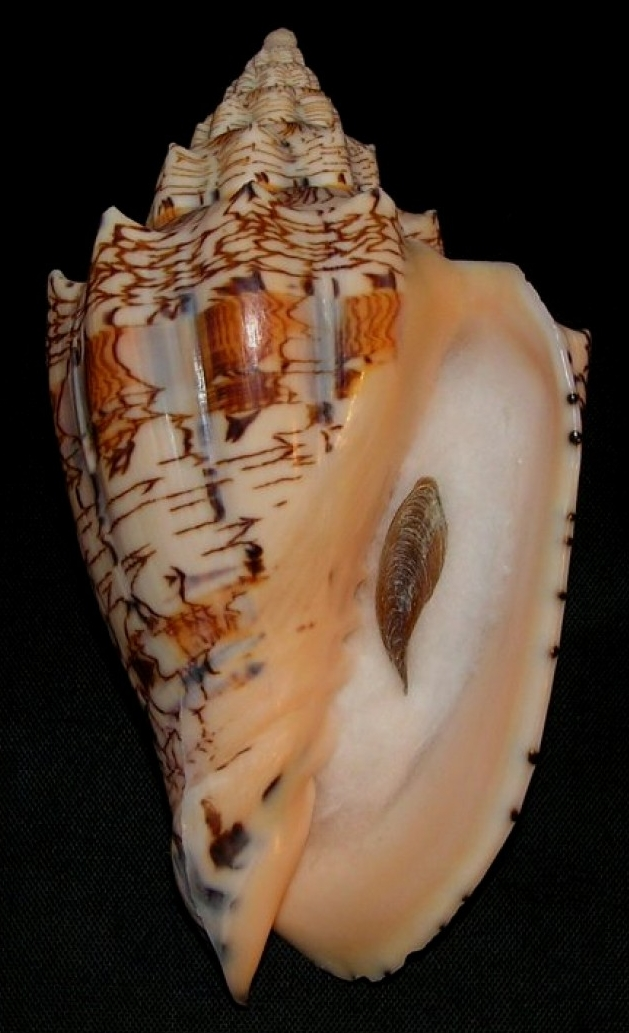
A shell of V. ebraea with its respective claw-like operculum (right, inside the aperture).

The shell of Voluta ebraea can exceed 200 mm in length, with specimens measuring up to 220 mm reported. However, shell lengths between 100 mm and 150 mm are more commonly observed. The shell is robust and solid, with a slightly elongate shape. The external coloration is typically cream, adorned with intricate, darker reddish-brown markings and lines that are said to resemble Hebraic characters. The interior varies in color from pale to vivid orange. The rounded protoconch comprises two whorls, and the complete shell includes seven slightly convex whorls. These whorls, including the body whorl, are decorated with several sharp, posteriorly-oriented spines.

The outer lip is thick, and the aperture is relatively long and narrow. As is characteristic of volutes, the columella features a series of strong, oblique columellar folds (also known as plicae), typically numbering between nine and eleven. These folds are especially prominent toward the anterior end of the shell. The operculum is corneous and claw-like in shape, partially covering the aperture.

According to some authors, sexual dimorphism is evident in the shell morphology; males generally possess more elongate shells with smoother surfaces, while females tend to have broader shells with more pronounced nodules. The angle of the shell's spire also varies between males and females: it's sharper in males (about 60°) and noticeably wider in females (around 75°).

Variation

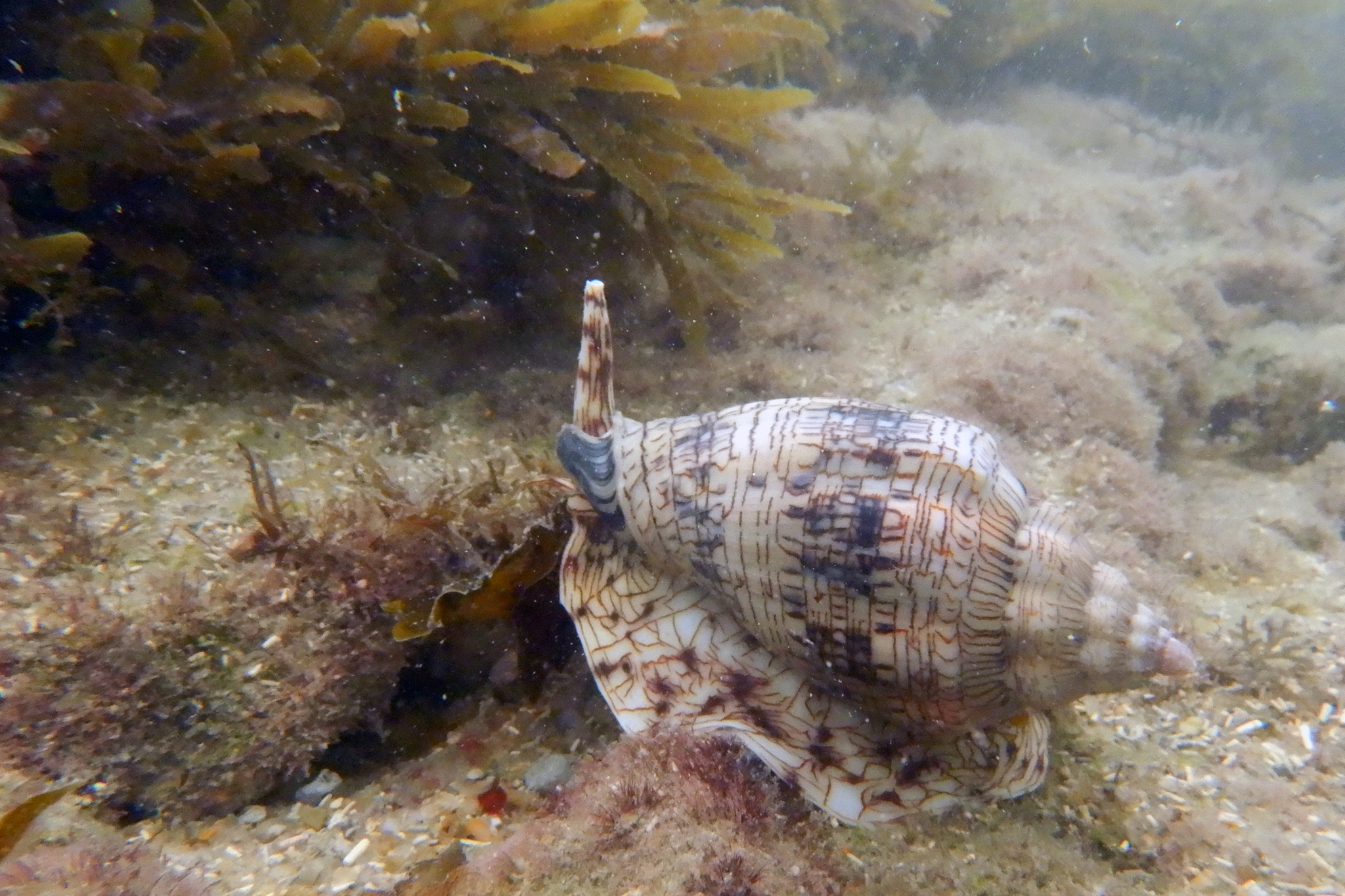
The body of V. ebraea is colored pale ivory and adorned with numerous dark red to brown lines and spots

The shell of V. ebraea shows a wide range of variation, especially in its pigmentation, surface sculpture, the presence and intensity of undulations, and the prominence of the shoulder. Some individuals have a rounded periphery, while others exhibit an almost keeled form with spines or nodes. The spire can vary greatly in height, while the overall shape of the shell can range from broad to narrow and elongated. The color pattern may be faint or densely marked. No particular phenotype is tied to a specific geographic location; instead, multiple shell variants are found coexisting in the same areas. This indicates that the variation in shell characteristics is likely driven by genetic rather than environmental factors, which is an argument against the division of V. ebraea into subspecies. The numerous varieties observed are better regarded as "forms" without taxonomic value, though they may hold significance among collectors and in the commercial shell trade.

=== Soft parts ===
Voluta ebraea has a pale ivory-colored body adorned with numerous irregular, intertwined dark red to brown lines, as well as several small spots of the same color along the sides of the foot. Notable external features include its exceptionally large foot and an siphon.

This species possesses a Stenoglossan-type radula, consisting of a single row of rachidian (central) teeth. Each tooth bears multiple small, sharply pointed denticles or cusps. The radula is similar in structure, though larger than that of the music volute, a related species.

== Distribution and habitat ==
Voluta ebraea is an endemic Brazilian species found exclusively along the northern and northeastern coasts of the country, where it inhabits the littoral zone. Its distribution spans several states and regions, including Pará, Maranhão, Ceará, Rio Grande do Norte, Paraíba, Pernambuco, Alagoas, Sergipe, Bahia, the Abrolhos Marine National Park, and the Areia Vermelha Marine State Park. V. ebraea dwells in sandy bottoms, among coral and rocks, and usually shows a preference for sandy substrata. It may be found from shallow water to depths around 40–70 m and is commonly taken by shrimp trawlers.

== Ecology ==
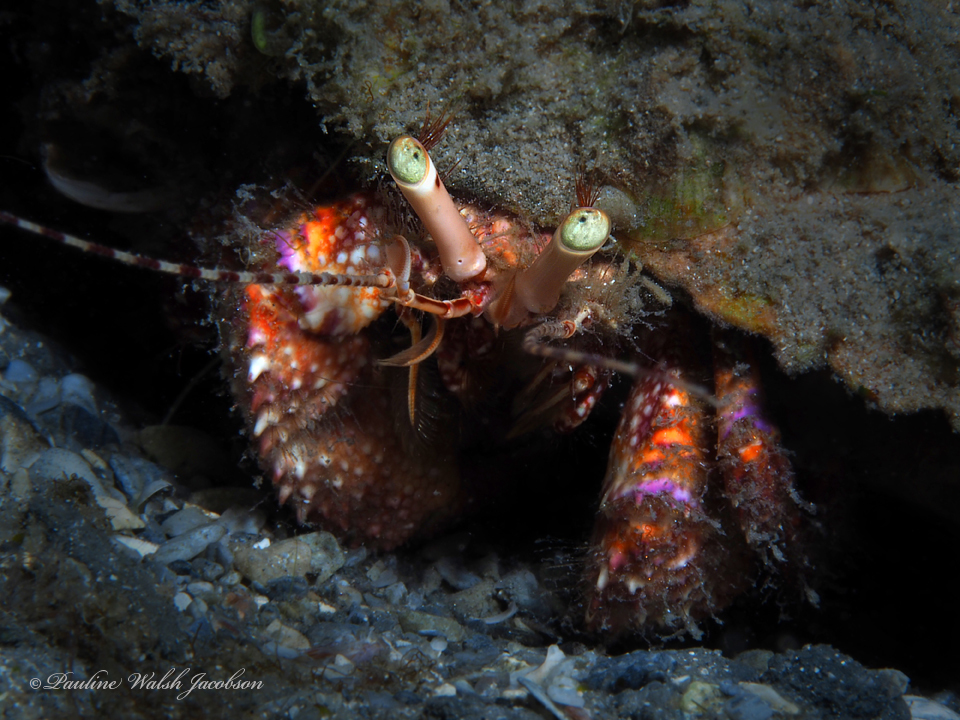
The hermit crab Petrochirus diogenes may occupy empty shells of V. ebraea

Little is known about the ecology of V. ebraea, as studies on the subject are fairly recent and/or rather scarce.

=== Life cycle ===
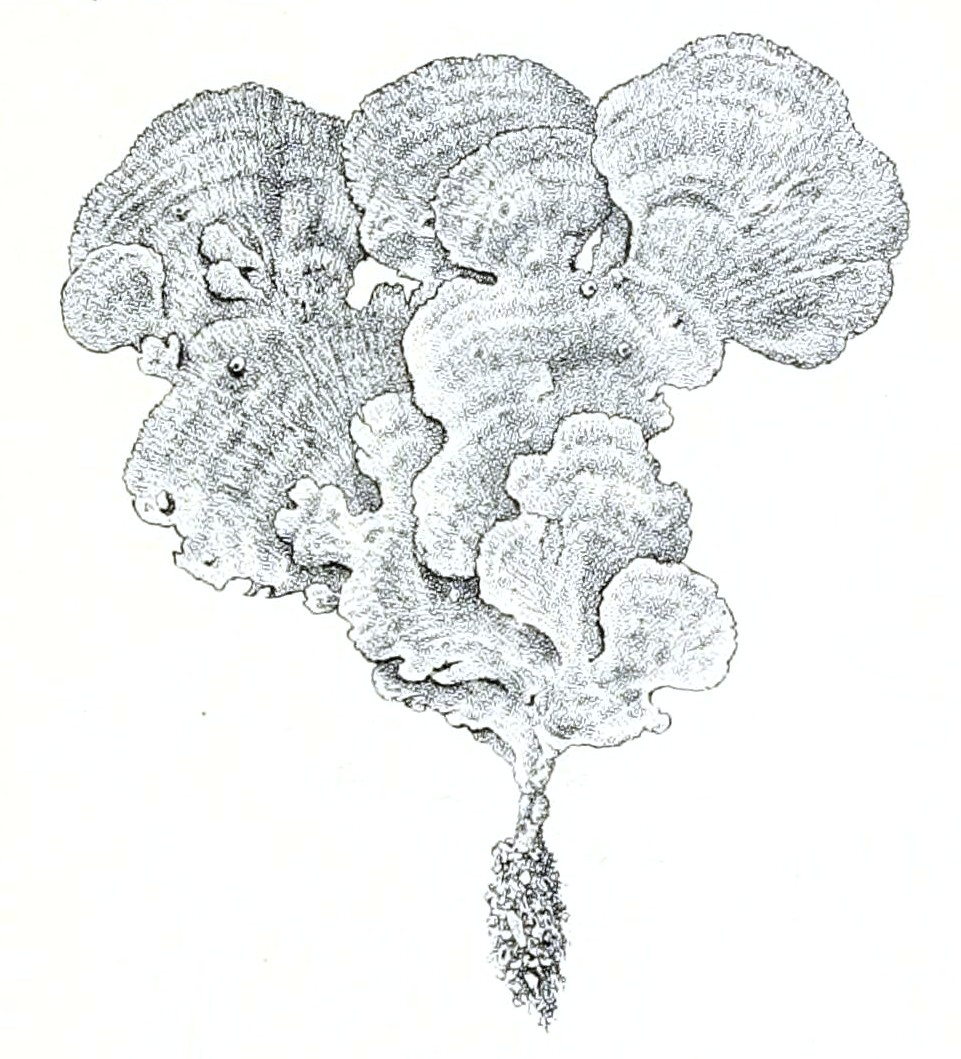
The fan-shaped thalli of the green algae Udotea occidentalis (figured) is used as a substrate for egg-laying by V. ebraea

Like other members of the clade Neogastropoda, Voluta ebraea is dioecious, which means each organism belonging to this species is distinctly male or female. It is also sexually dimorphic, which means there is a difference in form between individuals of different sex within this species.

The reproductive biology of V. ebraea had remained largely undocumented until a 2010 study described its egg capsules and early developmental stages for the first time. V. ebraea is known to spawn by laying egg capsules on the fan-shaped thalli of the calcareous green alga Udotea occidentalis in seagrass beds. Each capsule is circular, flattened, and approximately 18 mm in diameter. Capsules contain an average of three embryos, which develop directly into juveniles. The development proceeds from veliger embryos, which feature a prominent bilobed velum used for feeding within the capsule fluid, to fully formed juveniles with a shell length of around 8 mm. These hatchlings resemble adult specimens in shell morphology and coloration.

On a microscopic level, the egg capsule wall consists of three layers: an external proteinaceous layer (L1), a fibrous middle layer (L2), and an internal layer (L3) composed of proteins, carbohydrates, and glycoproteins. This structure is believed to facilitate gas and nutrient exchange during development, a trait shared with other volutids. The morphology of V. ebraea egg capsules is highly similar to that of Voluta musica, a related species endemic to Venezuela and Colombia. Both species produce small, single egg capsules with few embryos. However, the attachment of V. ebraea capsules to algae, rather than hard substrates like shells, represents a novel ecological observation within the family Volutidae.

A 2024 study reported novel findings on the spawning behavior of V. ebraea, documenting for the first time the deposition of egg capsules on broken mollusk shells in rocky-bottom intertidal zones at Pedra Rachada Beach, also in Ceará. Egg capsules were found attached to the inner (concave) surface of a shell fragment of the also endemic gastropod Titanostrombus goliath. These findings support earlier hypotheses that deeper or variable populations of V. ebraea may utilize alternative hard substrates, such as bivalve shells or rocky surfaces, for spawning, much like other volutid species.

=== Feeding habits ===
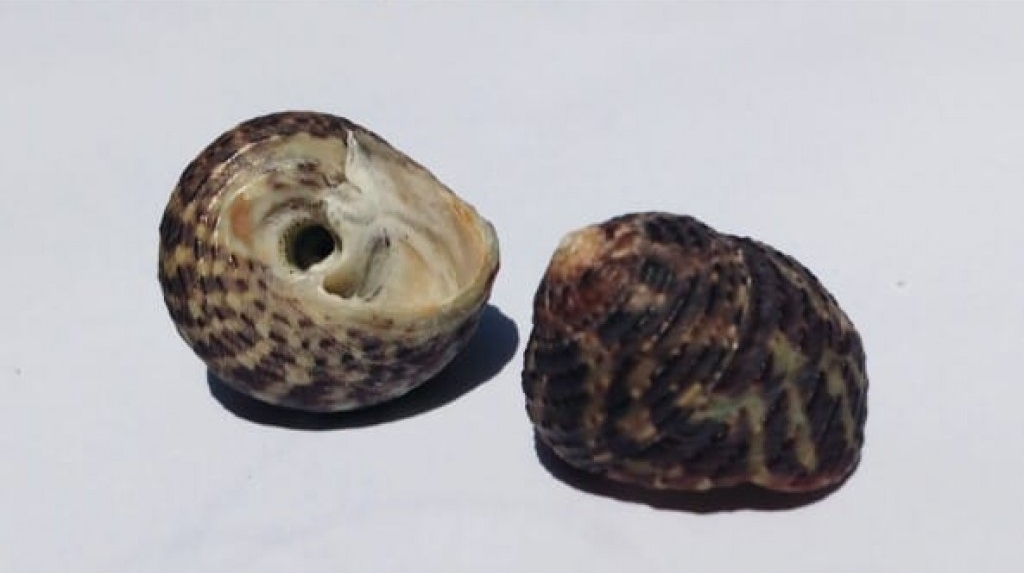
The top-snail Agathistoma viridulum is prey of V. ebraea.

Like many other members of the volute family, Voluta ebraea is a carnivorous predator. In the wild, it has been observed feeding on the bivalve Dallocardia muricata. In captivity, it has also been seen eating other sea snails, including Stramonita brasiliensis (a predatory muricid species) and Agathistoma viridulum (a species of top-snail).

=== Biological interactions ===
Various animals interact with the Voluta ebraea in diverse ways. The chiton Ischnochiton striolatus is a known inquiline of V. ebraea, living attached to its shell. Once it is vacated, the shell is also often occupied by the hermit crab Petrochirus diogenes. Additionally, other invertebrates such as the gastropod Crepidula plana and certain barnacle species may use the shell as a substrate for attachment and habitation. Known predators of V. ebraea include the Bocon toadfish (Amphichthys cryptocentrus).

== Human use and conservation ==
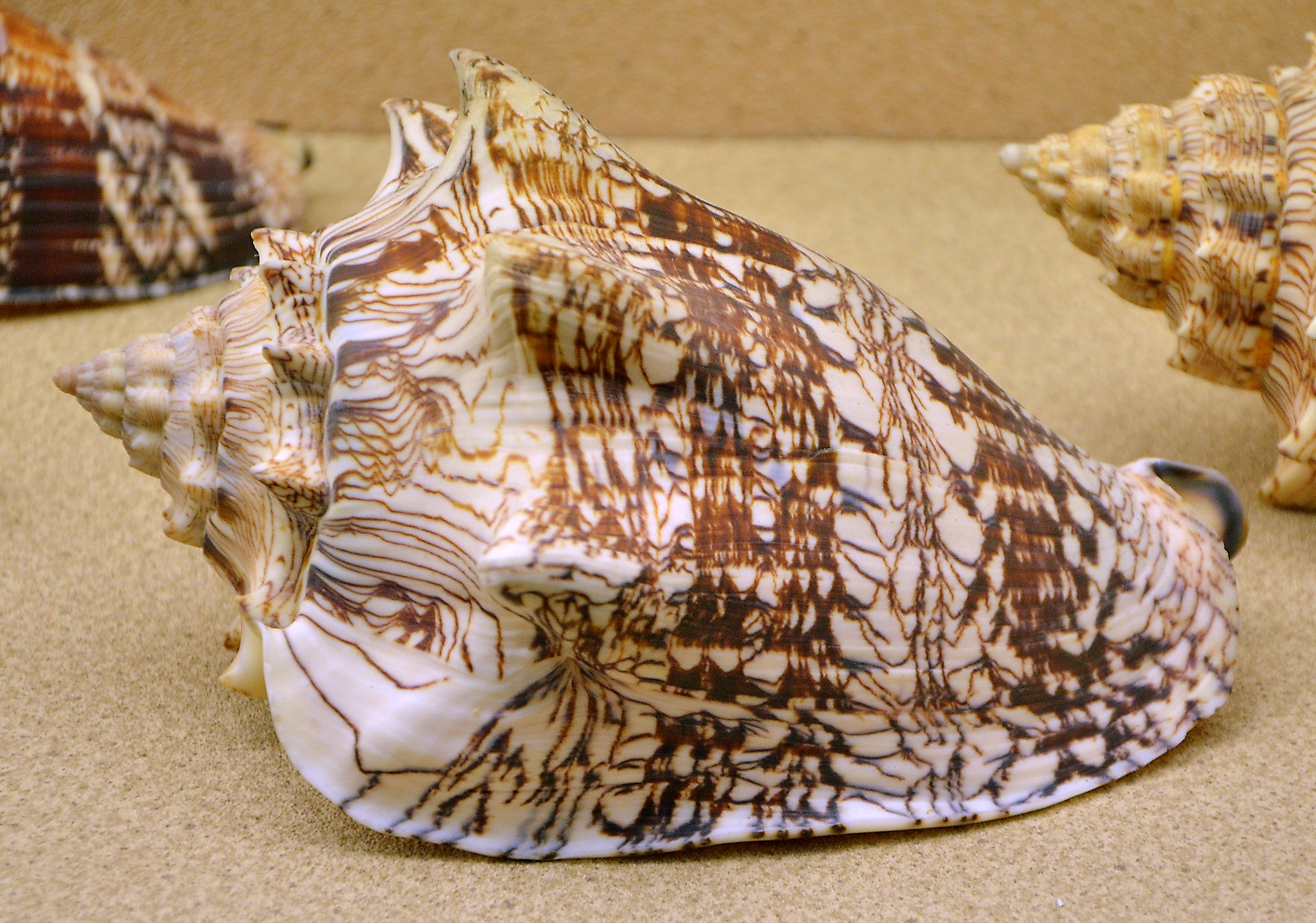
A shell of V. ebraea exhibited at the Sea Shell Museum, Phuket

The flesh of Voluta ebraea is edible and is commonly collected for food in many regions. Its attractive shell is also popular as a decorative item and is often sold as a souvenir in local markets and craft shops throughout parts of Brazil.

Although not much is known about its official conservation status, V. ebraea appears to be under pressure from both overfishing and overharvesting. Because it lives in shallow waters, it's relatively easy to collect, which has likely contributed to its decline. In fact, the species is no longer seen in many places where it used to be common.

The imposex phenomenon, which is the development of nonfunctioning male sexual organs in females exposed to organic tin compounds such as tributyltin (TBT) or triphenyltin (TPT) has been observed in V. ebraea. It may have several negative consequences for entire populations of the species, from sterilization of individuals to their complete extinction. Such compounds act as biocides and antifouling agents, commonly mixed in paints to prevent marine encrustations on boats and ships. Therefore, it is not uncommon for high concentrations of such compounds to be present in the sea water near shipyards and docking areas, consequently exposing the nearby marine life to its deleterious effects.
