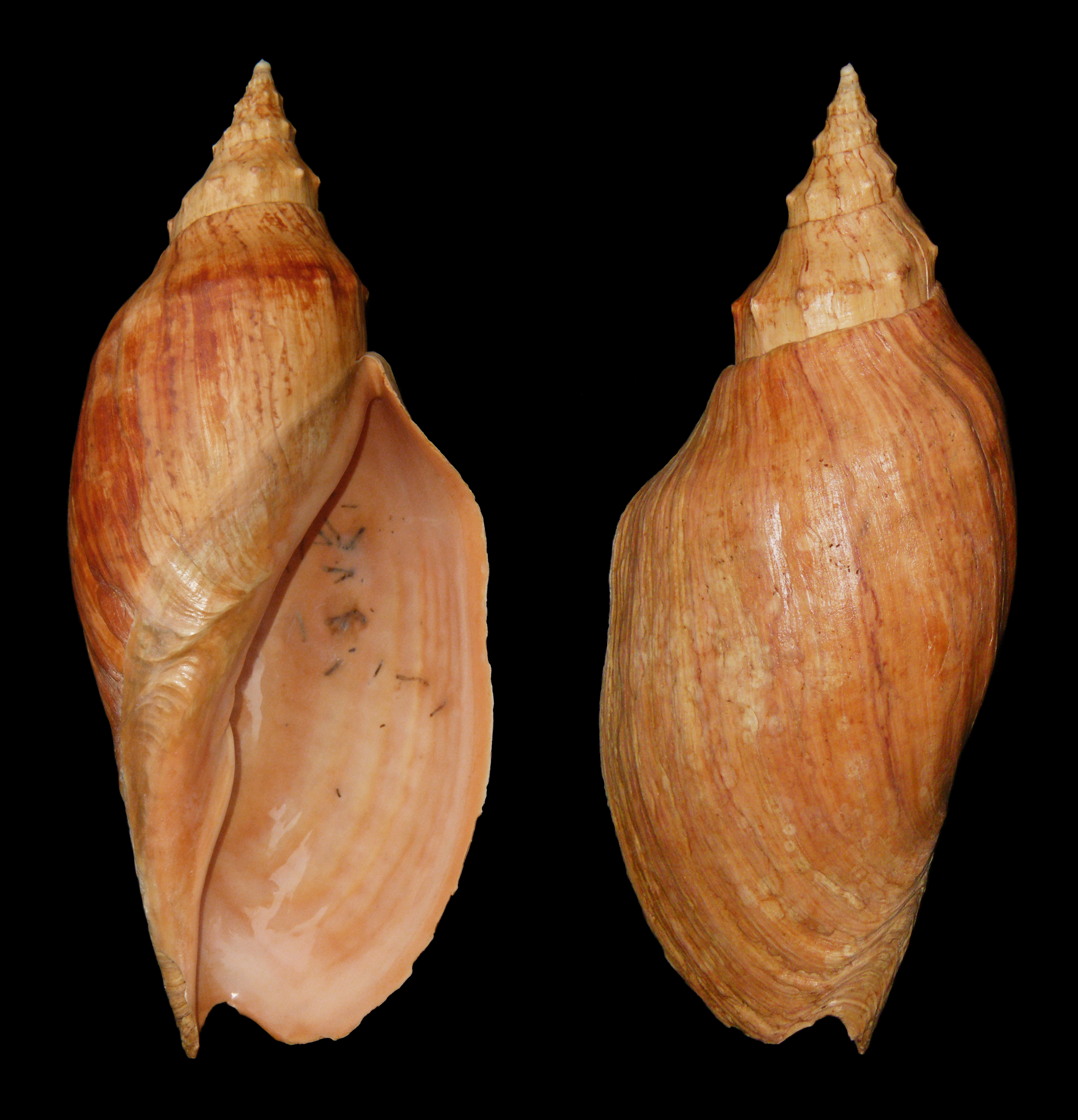
- shell of Adelomelon beckii

Scientific classification
- Kingdom: Animalia
- Phylum: Mollusca
- Class: Gastropoda
- Subclass: Caenogastropoda
- Order: Neogastropoda
- Family: Volutidae
- Tribe: Adelomelonini
- Genus: Adelomelon; Dall, 1906

Type species
- Voluta ancilla Lightfoot, 1786

Synonyms
- Adelomelon (Adelomelon) Dall, 1906; Adelomelon (Weaveria) Clench & R. D. Turner, 1964; † Eoscaphella Stilwell & Zinsmeister, 1992 ·; Janeithoe Pilsbry & Olsson, 1854; Weaveria Clench & Turner, 1964

= Adelomelon =

Genus of gastropods

Adelomelon is a genus of sea snails, marine gastropod mollusks in the family Volutidae.

== Taxonomy ==
Adelomelon Dall; new name for the dull-colored group of South American volutes usually called Scaphella, but not the Scaphella of Swainson, 1832.

== Description ==
The medium-sized to large shell is smooth or knobbed. The protoconch is small and smooth with or without a calcarella.

== Species ==
Species within the genus Adelomelon include:

- † Adelomelon altum (G. B. Sowerby I, 1846)
- Adelomelon ancilla (Lightfoot, 1786)
- Adelomelon beckii (Broderip, 1836)
- † Adelomelon cannada (Ihering, 1907)
- † Adelomelon caupolicani S. N. Nielsen & Frassinetti, 2007
- † Adelomelon colocoloi S. N. Nielsen & Frassinetti, 2007
- † Adelomelon ellioti (Stilwell & Zinsmeister, 1992)
- † Adelomelon fordycei (Stilwell & Zinsmeister, 1992)
- † Adelomelon obesum (R. A. Philippi, 1887)
- † Adelomelon pilsbryi (Ihering, 1899)
- † Adelomelon posei F. Scarabino, Martinez, del Río, Oleinik, Camacho & Zinsmeister, 2004
- † Adelomelon reconditum Frassinetti, 2000
- Adelomelon riosi Clench & Turner, 1964
- † Adelomelon suropsilos (Stilwell & Zinsmeister, 1992)
- † Adelomelon valdesiense F. Scarabino, Martinez, del Río, Oleinik, Camacho & Zinsmeister, 2004

Species brought into synonymy

- Adelomelon barattinii Klappenbach & Ureta, 1966 : synonym of Adelomelon (Adelomelon) ancilla (Lightfoot, 1786) represented as Adelomelon ancilla (Lightfoot, 1786)
- Adelomelon brasilianum (Lamarck, 1811): synonym of Pachycymbiola brasiliana (Lamarck, 1811)
- Adelomelon ferussacii (Donovan, 1824): synonym of Pachycymbiola ferussacii (Donovan, 1824)
- Adelomelon indigestus Von Ihering, 1908: synonym of Adelomelon (Adelomelon) beckii (Broderip, 1836) represented as Adelomelon beckii (Broderip, 1836)
- Adelomelon paradoxa (Lahille, 1895): synonym of Odontocymbiola magellanica (Gmelin, 1791)
- Adelomelon scoresbyanum (Powell, 1951): synonym of Pachycymbiola scoresbyana (A. W. B. Powell, 1951)
- Adelomelon subnodosa (Leach, 1814): synonym of Odontocymbiola magellanica (Gmelin, 1791)
