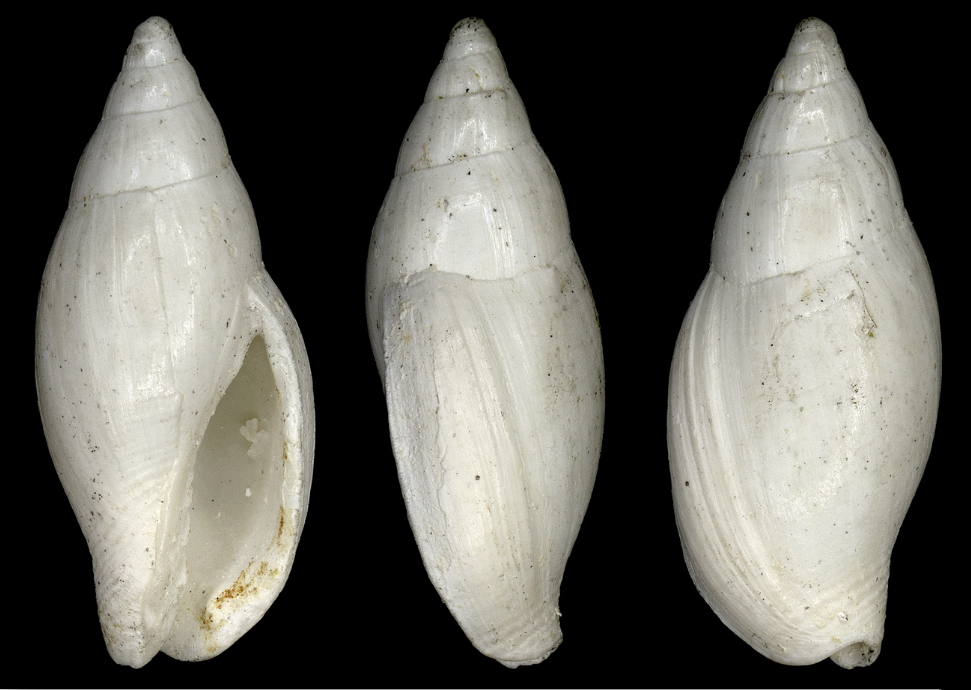
- Shell of Voluta mitreola (specimen at MNHN, Paris)

Scientific classification
- Kingdom: Animalia
- Phylum: Mollusca
- Class: Gastropoda
- Subclass: Caenogastropoda
- Order: Neogastropoda
- Family: Volutidae
- Subfamily: Volutinae
- Genus: Voluta
- Species: †V. mitreola

Binomial name
- †Voluta mitreola Lamarck, 1803

Synonyms
- † Harpula mitreola (Lamarck, 1803)

= Voluta mitreola =

Species of gastropod

Voluta mitreola is an extinct species of sea snail, a marine gastropod mollusk in the family Volutidae, the volutes.

== Description ==
(Original description in Latin) The shell is smooth, ovate with an acute apex. The inner lip is faintly bidentate within. The shell is barely 9 mm long, resembling a small mitre; the left margin of the aperture slightly overlaps the columella

== Distribution ==
Fossils of this marine species were found in Lutetian strata in France.
