= Voluta supplicata =

Scientific classification
- Kingdom: Animalia
- Phylum: Mollusca
- Class: Gastropoda
- Subclass: Caenogastropoda
- Order: Neogastropoda
- Family: Volutidae
- Subfamily: Volutinae
- Genus: Voluta
- Species: †V. supplicata

Binomial name
- †Voluta supplicata Traub, 1981

Species of gastropod

Voluta supplicata is an extinct species of sea snail, a marine gastropod mollusk in the family Volutidae, the volutes.

== Distribution ==
Fossils of this marine species were in Helvetic nappes near Salzburg, Austria
