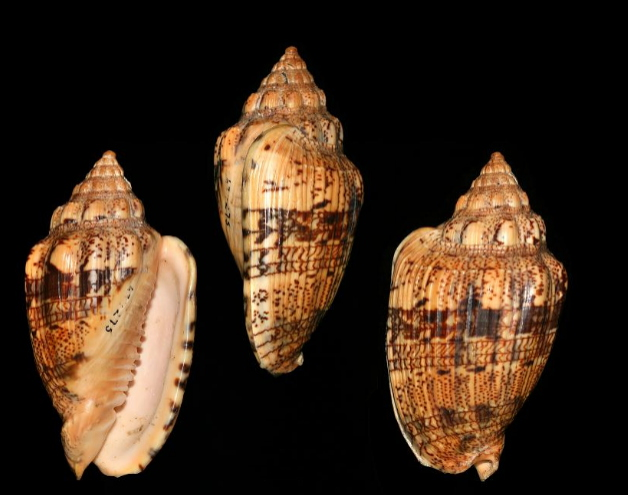
- Shell of Voluta demarcoi (specimen at the Smithsonian Institution)

Scientific classification
- Kingdom: Animalia
- Phylum: Mollusca
- Class: Gastropoda
- Subclass: Caenogastropoda
- Order: Neogastropoda
- Family: Volutidae
- Subfamily: Volutinae
- Genus: Voluta
- Species: V. demarcoi

Binomial name
- Voluta demarcoi Olsson, 1965

= Voluta demarcoi =

Species of gastropod

Voluta demarcoi is a species of medium-sized sea snail, a marine gastropod mollusk in the family Volutidae, the volutes.

== Description ==
The length of the shell varies between 79 mm and 84.6 mm.

== Distribution ==
Locus typicus: Punta Patuca, Honduras.

This marine species occurs from Cabo Camaron, Honduras, to Puerto Cabezas, Nicaragua.
