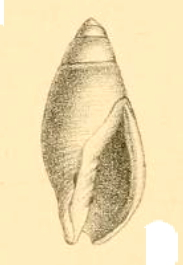
- Drawing of a shell of Voluta intusdentata (holotype)

Scientific classification
- Kingdom: Animalia
- Phylum: Mollusca
- Class: Gastropoda
- Subclass: Caenogastropoda
- Order: Neogastropoda
- Family: Volutidae
- Subfamily: Volutinae
- Genus: Voluta
- Species: V. intusdentata

Binomial name
- Voluta intusdentata Cossmann, 1889

Synonyms
- † Harpula intusdentata (Cossmann, 1889)

= Voluta intusdentata =

Species of gastropod

Voluta intusdentata is an extinct species of sea snail, a marine gastropod mollusk in the family Volutidae, the volutes.

== Description ==
The length of the shell attains 8.5 mm, its diameter is 4 mm.

== Distribution ==
Fossils of this marine species were found in Bartonian strata in France.
