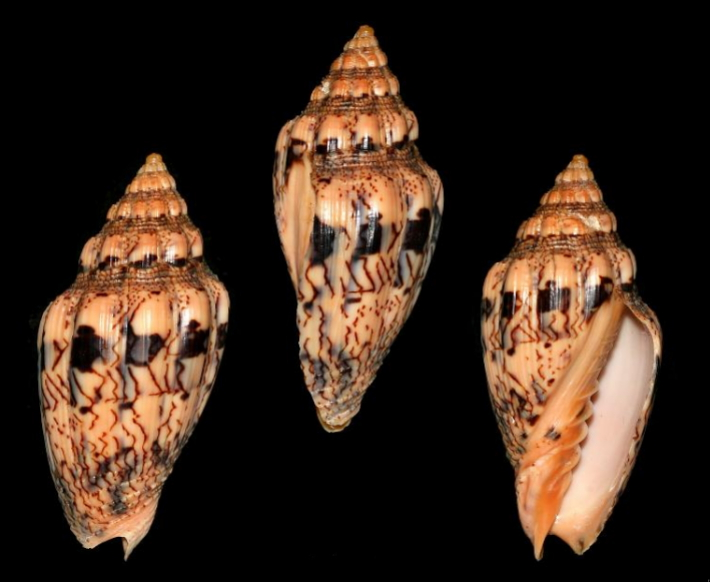
- Shell of Voluta garciai (holotype at the Smithsonian Institution)

Scientific classification
- Kingdom: Animalia
- Phylum: Mollusca
- Class: Gastropoda
- Subclass: Caenogastropoda
- Order: Neogastropoda
- Family: Volutidae
- Subfamily: Volutinae
- Genus: Voluta
- Species: V. garciai

Binomial name
- Voluta garciai (Petuch, 1981)

Synonyms
- Falsilyria garciai Petuch, 1981

= Voluta garciai =

Species of gastropod

Voluta garciai is a species of medium-sized sea snail, a marine gastropod mollusk in the family Volutidae, the volutes.

== Description ==
The length of the shell attains 71 mm, its diameter 34 mm. The shell's color is a light brown with black areas

== Distribution ==
This marine species occurs off the Gorda Bank to Trujillo Bay, Honduras.
