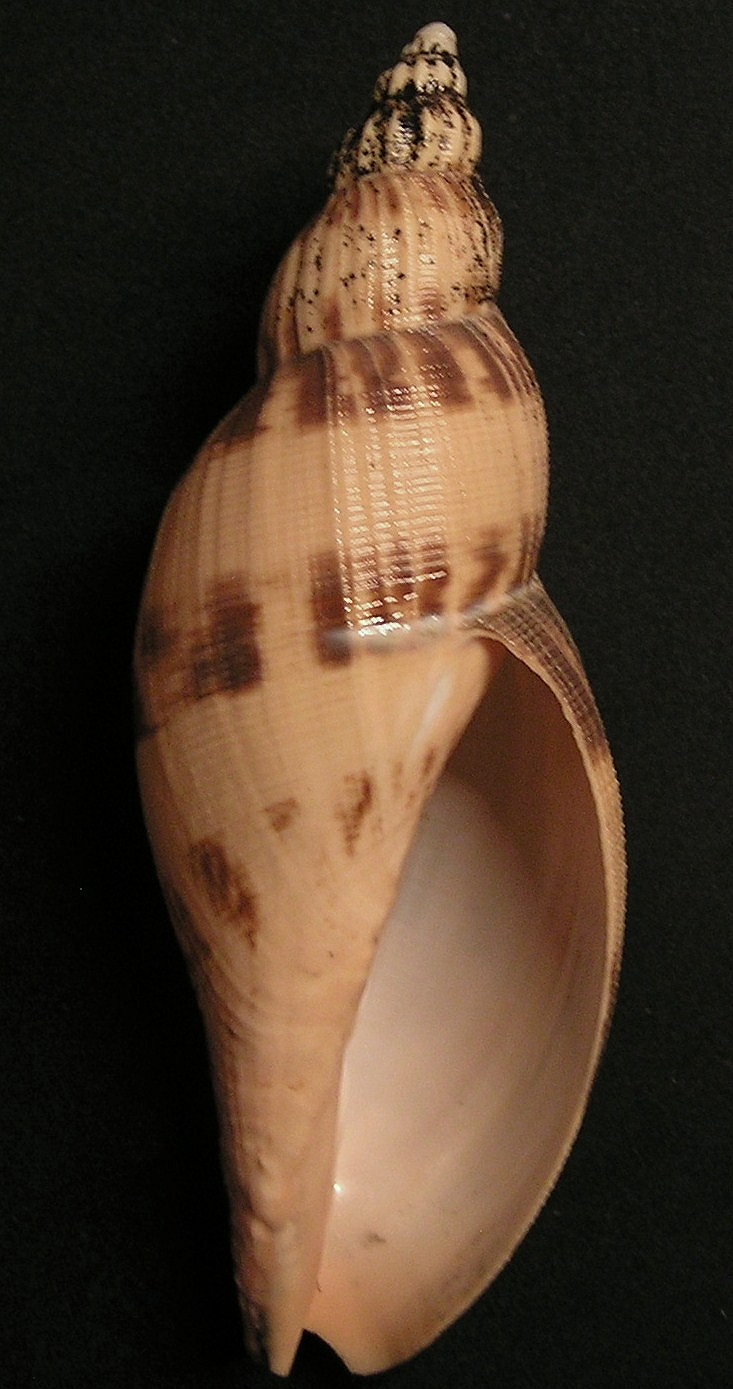
- Apertural view of Odontocymbiola simulatrix

Scientific classification
- Kingdom: Animalia
- Phylum: Mollusca
- Class: Gastropoda
- Subclass: Caenogastropoda
- Order: Neogastropoda
- Family: Volutidae
- Genus: Odontocymbiola
- Species: O. simulatrix

Binomial name
- Odontocymbiola simulatrix Leal & Bouchet, 1989

Synonyms
- Adelomelon simulatrix Leal & Bouchet, 1989

= Odontocymbiola simulatrix =

Species of gastropod

Odontocymbiola simulatrix is a species of sea snail, a marine gastropod mollusc in the family Volutidae, the volutes.

== Distribution ==
Deep water, Western Atlantic, Brazil.
