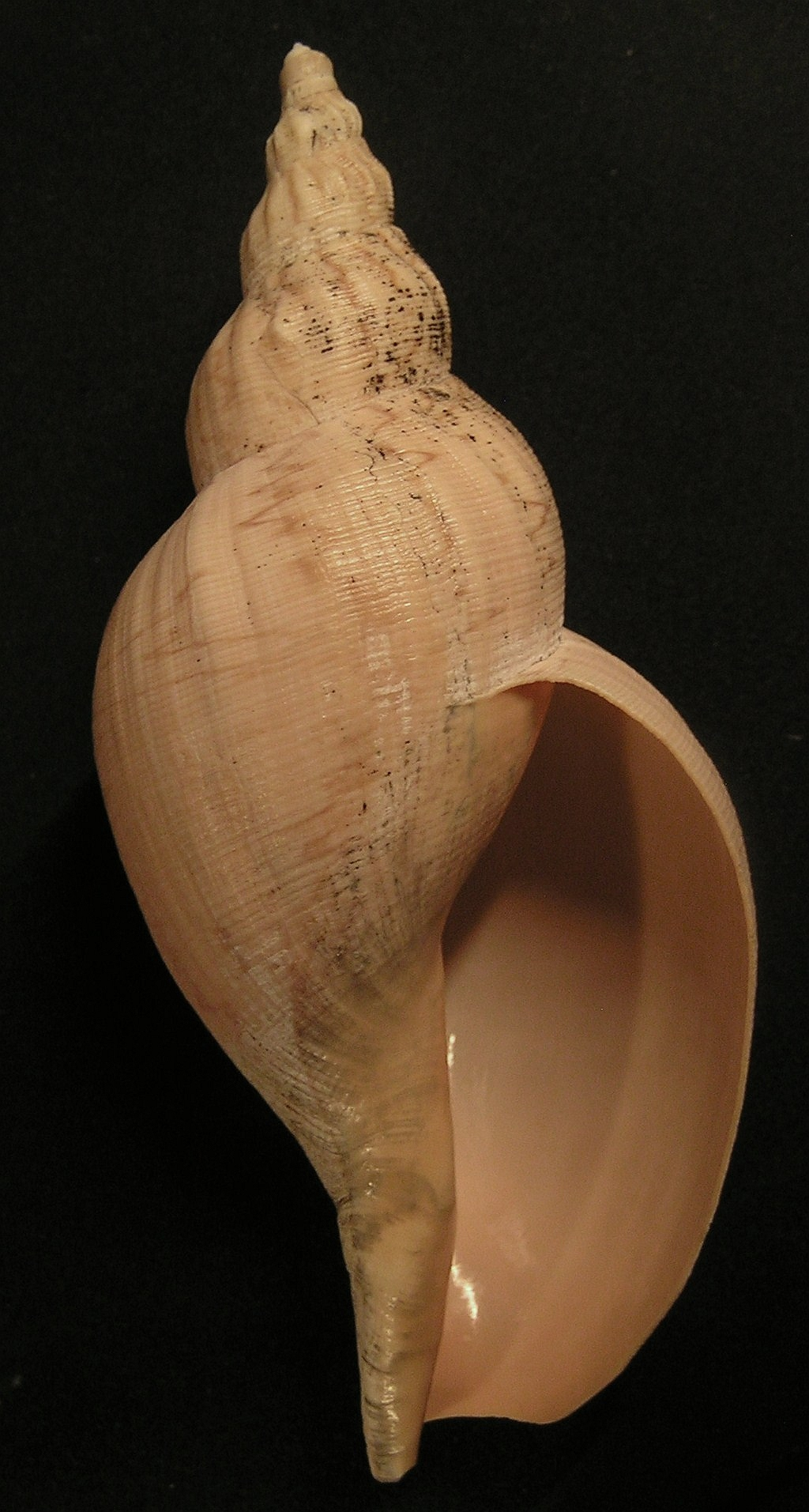
- Apertural view of Adelomelon riosi

Scientific classification
- Kingdom: Animalia
- Phylum: Mollusca
- Class: Gastropoda
- Subclass: Caenogastropoda
- Order: Neogastropoda
- Family: Volutidae
- Genus: Adelomelon
- Species: A. riosi

Binomial name
- Adelomelon riosi Clench & Turner, 1964

Synonyms
- Adelomelon (Adelomelon) riosi Clench & Turner, 1964

= Adelomelon riosi =

Species of gastropod

Adelomelon riosi, common name Rios's volute, is a species of sea snail, a marine gastropod mollusk in the family Volutidae, the volutes.

== Description ==
The length of the shell varies between 200 mm and 315 mm.

== Distribution ==
This marine species occurs off the Atlantic coast of South America, from Brazil to Argentina. Sometimes trawled in 300–320 meters depth.
