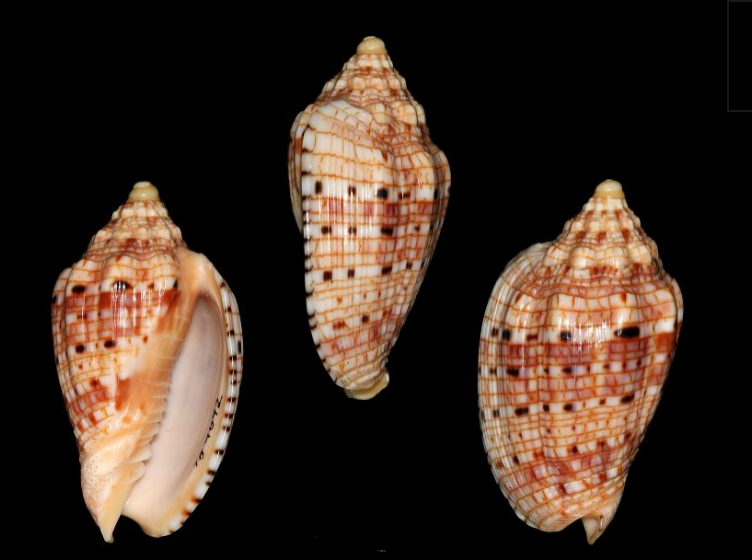
- Shell of Voluta kotorai (holotype at the Smithsonian Institution)

Scientific classification
- Kingdom: Animalia
- Phylum: Mollusca
- Class: Gastropoda
- Subclass: Caenogastropoda
- Order: Neogastropoda
- Family: Volutidae
- Subfamily: Volutinae
- Genus: Voluta
- Species: V. kotorai

Binomial name
- Voluta kotorai (Petuch, 1981)

Synonyms
- Falsilyria kotorai Petuch, 1981

= Voluta kotorai =

Species of gastropod

Voluta kotorai is a species of medium-sized sea snail, a marine gastropod mollusk in the family Volutidae, the volutes.

== Description ==
The length of the shell attains 49 mm, its diameter is 27 mm.

== Distribution ==
This marine species occurs off Corn and San Andres Islands, Nicaragua, and Gorda, Roncador, Quitasueňo, and Serrana Banks.
