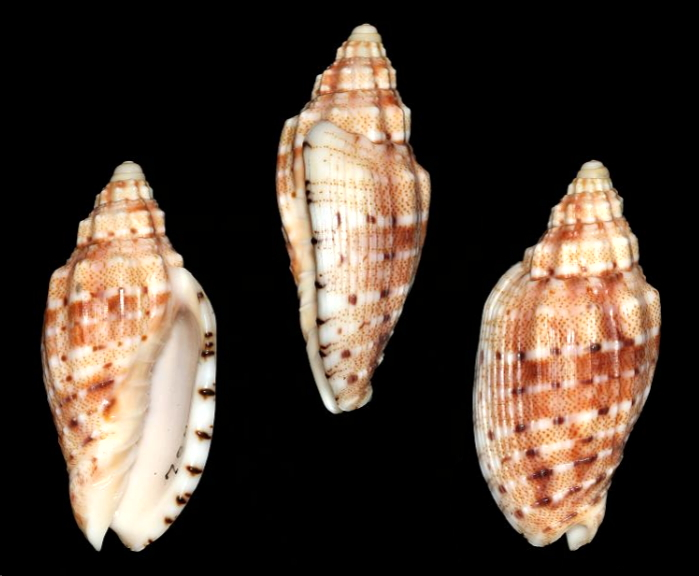
- Shell of Voluta harasewychi (holotype at the Smithsonian Institution)

Scientific classification
- Kingdom: Animalia
- Phylum: Mollusca
- Class: Gastropoda
- Subclass: Caenogastropoda
- Order: Neogastropoda
- Family: Volutidae
- Subfamily: Volutinae
- Genus: Voluta
- Species: V. harasewychi

Binomial name
- Voluta harasewychi (Petuch, 1987)

Synonyms
- Falsilyria harasewychi Petuch, 1987; Voluta morrisoni harasewychi (Petuch, 1984)

= Voluta harasewychi =

Species of gastropod

Voluta harasewychi is a species of medium-sized sea snail, a marine gastropod mollusk in the family Volutidae, the volutes.

== Description ==
The shell is robust and smooth, with a much lower spire compared to similar species. It has a rounded shoulder adorned with 8 to 9 rounded axial ribs that form weak knobs. The protoconch, or nuclear whorls, is large, bulbous, and consists of 3 tan-brown colored whorls. The opening of the shell (aperture) is long and narrow, with the outer lip adhering to the side of the body whorl rather than flaring outwards. The columella is distinctly curved and has 8 major, smooth plications (folds) and 3 minor ones. The base color of the shell is creamy white. The body whorl is marked with two bands of longitudinal medium brown zigzag flammules (flame-like markings). Patches of small, brown dots are scattered over the base color of the body and spire whorls. Maximum reported shell lengths range from approximately 45 mm to 80 mm.

== Distribution ==
This marine species occurs is endemic to the north coast of Roatan Island, Honduras
