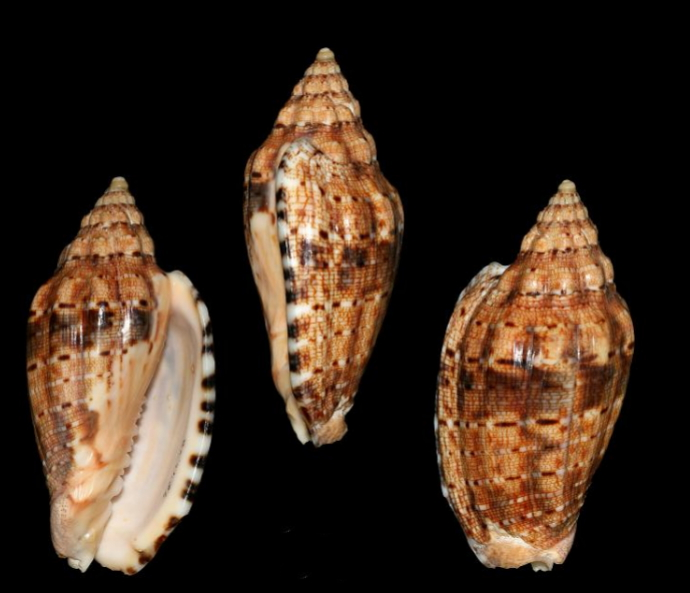
- Shell of Voluta retemirabilis (holotype at the Smithsonian Institution)

Scientific classification
- Kingdom: Animalia
- Phylum: Mollusca
- Class: Gastropoda
- Subclass: Caenogastropoda
- Order: Neogastropoda
- Family: Volutidae
- Subfamily: Volutinae
- Genus: Voluta
- Species: V. retemirabilis

Binomial name
- Voluta retemirabilis (Petuch, 1981)

Synonyms
- Falsilyria retemirabilis Petuch, 1981; Voluta polypleura retemirabilis (Petuch, 1981)

= Voluta retemirabilis =

Species of gastropod

Voluta retemirabilis is a species of medium-sized sea snail, a marine gastropod mollusk in the family Volutidae, the volutes.

== Description ==
The shell has a biconic shape, with notably colourful stripes and patches along the exterior, and ridges along the lip of the aperture. The length of the shell attains 49 mm, its diameter 27 mm.

== Distribution ==
This marine species is endemic to Misteriosa Bank, between Belize and the Cayman Islands.
