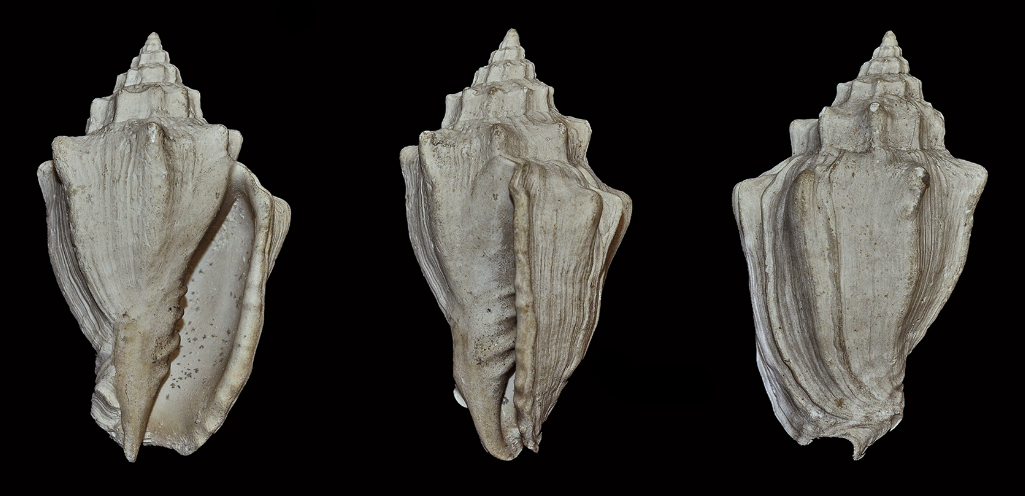
- Shell of † Voluta musicalis (specimen at MNHN, Paris)

Scientific classification
- Kingdom: Animalia
- Phylum: Mollusca
- Class: Gastropoda
- Subclass: Caenogastropoda
- Order: Neogastropoda
- Family: Volutidae
- Subfamily: Volutinae
- Genus: Voluta
- Species: V. musicalis

Binomial name
- Voluta musicalis Lamarck, 1803

Synonyms
- † Plejona musicalis (Lamarck, 1803); † Pseudaulicina musicalis (Lamarck, 1803); † Volutilithes musicalis (Lamarck, 1803)

= Voluta musicalis =

Species of gastropod

Voluta musicalis is an extinct species of sea snail, a marine gastropod mollusk in the family Volutidae, the volutes.

== Distribution ==
Fossils of this marine species were found in Lutetian strata in France.
