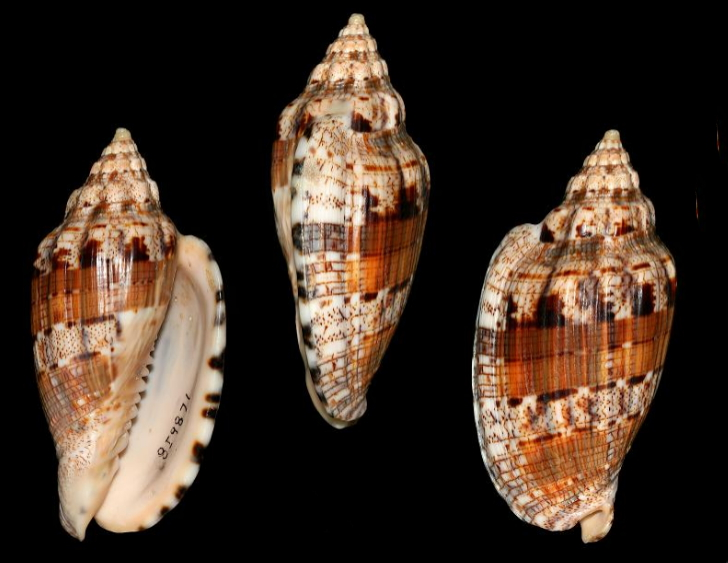
- Shell of Voluta hilli (holotype at the Smithsonian Institution)

Scientific classification
- Kingdom: Animalia
- Phylum: Mollusca
- Class: Gastropoda
- Subclass: Caenogastropoda
- Order: Neogastropoda
- Family: Volutidae
- Subfamily: Volutinae
- Genus: Voluta
- Species: V. hilli

Binomial name
- Voluta hilli (Petuch, 1987)

Synonyms
- Falsilyria hilli Petuch, 1987; Voluta polypleura hilli (Petuch, 1987)

= Voluta hilli =

Species of gastropod

Voluta hilli is a species of medium-sized sea snail, a marine gastropod mollusk in the family Volutidae, the volutes.

== Description ==
The length of the shell attains 61.1 mm.

== Distribution ==
This marine species is endemic from the Gorda Bank to the Cajones and Bercero Cays, off Honduras.
