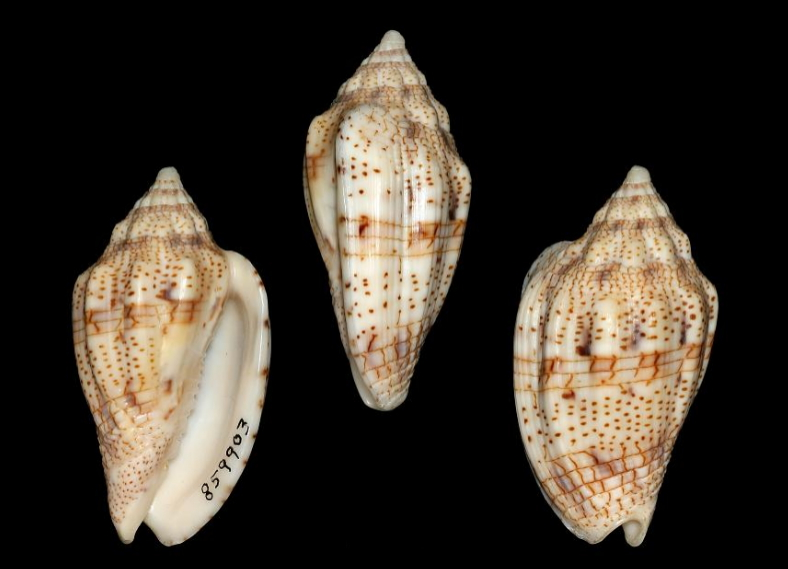
- Shell of Voluta sunderlandi (holotype at the Smithsonian Institution)

Scientific classification
- Kingdom: Animalia
- Phylum: Mollusca
- Class: Gastropoda
- Subclass: Caenogastropoda
- Order: Neogastropoda
- Family: Volutidae
- Subfamily: Volutinae
- Genus: Voluta
- Species: V. sunderlandi

Binomial name
- Voluta sunderlandi (Petuch, 1987)

Synonyms
- Falsilyria sunderlandi Petuch, 1987; Voluta polypleura sunderlandi (E.J. Petuch, 1987)

= Voluta sunderlandi =

Species of gastropod

Voluta sunderlandi is a species of medium-sized sea snail, a marine gastropod mollusk in the family Volutidae, the volutes.

== Description ==
The length of the shell attains 49 mm.

== Distribution ==
This marine species is endemic to Utila Island and the adjacent coastline, Honduras.
