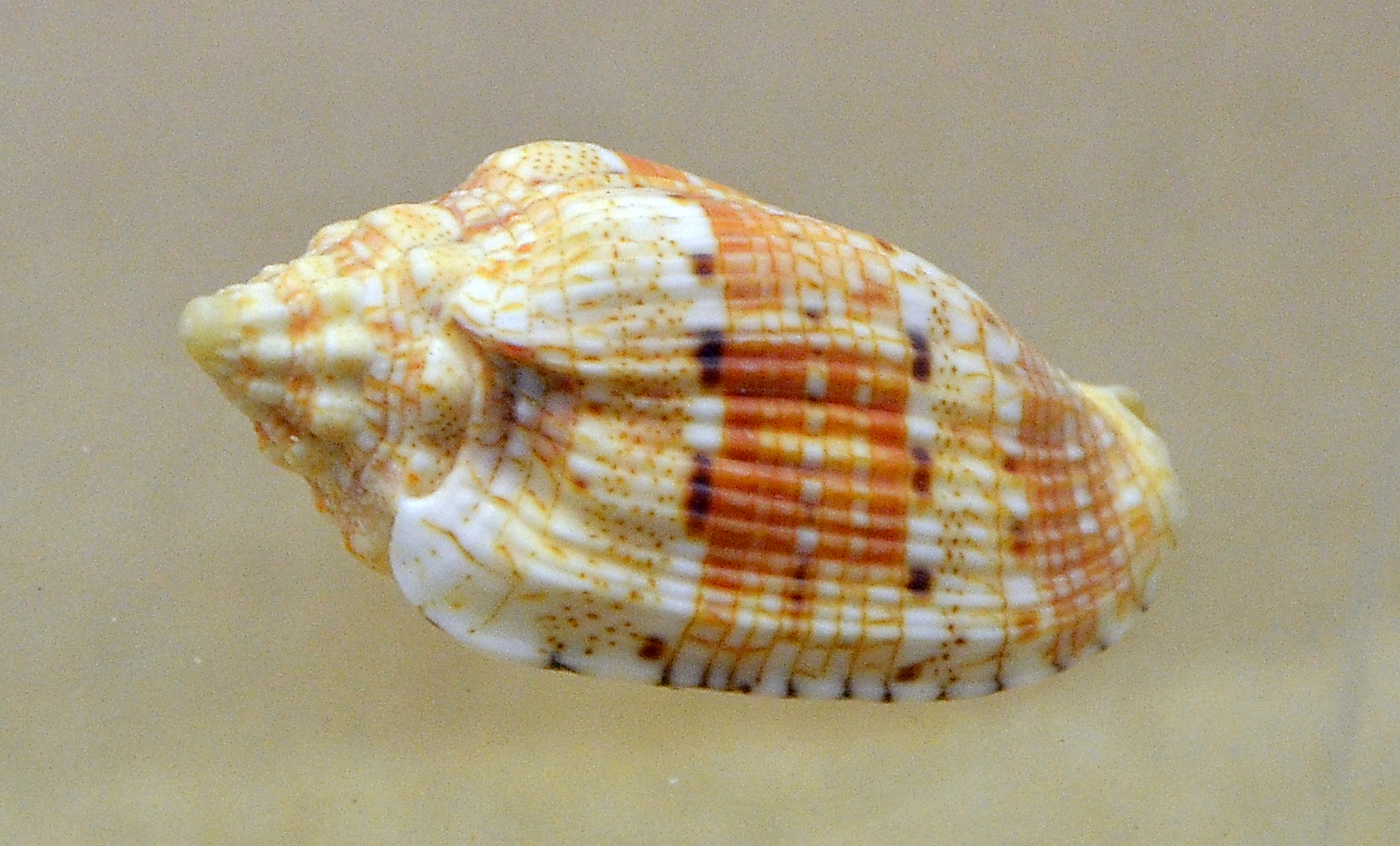

Scientific classification
- Kingdom: Animalia
- Phylum: Mollusca
- Class: Gastropoda
- Subclass: Caenogastropoda
- Order: Neogastropoda
- Family: Volutidae
- Genus: Voluta
- Species: V. morrisoni

Binomial name
- Voluta morrisoni (Petuch, 1980)

Synonyms
- Falsilyria harasewychi Petuch, 1987

= Voluta morrisoni =

Species of gastropod

Voluta morrisoni is a species of sea snail, a marine gastropod mollusk in the family Volutidae, the volutes.
