= Voluta ernesti =

Scientific classification
- Kingdom: Animalia
- Phylum: Mollusca
- Class: Gastropoda
- Subclass: Caenogastropoda
- Order: Neogastropoda
- Family: Volutidae
- Subfamily: Volutinae
- Genus: Voluta
- Species: V. ernesti

Binomial name
- Voluta ernesti (Petuch, 1990)

Synonyms
- Falsilyria ernesti Petuch, 1990

Species of gastropod

Voluta ernesti is a species of medium-sized sea snail, a marine gastropod mollusk in the family Volutidae, the volutes.

== Description ==
The length of the shell attains 54 mm.

== Distribution ==
This marine species occurs between Punta Gorda, Honduras and the San Blas Islands, Caribbean coast of Panama.
