= Voluta hamiltonensis =

Scientific classification
- Kingdom: Animalia
- Phylum: Mollusca
- Class: Gastropoda
- Subclass: Caenogastropoda
- Order: Neogastropoda
- Family: Volutidae
- Subfamily: Volutinae
- Genus: Voluta
- Species: V. hamiltonensis

Binomial name
- Voluta hamiltonensis Pritchard, 1898

Species of gastropod

Voluta hamiltonensis is an extinct species of sea snail, a marine gastropod mollusk in the family Volutidae, the volutes.

== Description ==
Specimens of the species have a fusiform shell, axial sculpture, and non-extended outer lip, with flattened whorls on its spire. A smooth, relatively spherical protoconch is seen at the end of the spire.

== Distribution ==
Fossils of this marine species were found in Tertiary strata in Victoria, Australia.
