= Voluta junghuhni =

Scientific classification
- Kingdom: Animalia
- Phylum: Mollusca
- Class: Gastropoda
- Subclass: Caenogastropoda
- Order: Neogastropoda
- Family: Volutidae
- Subfamily: Volutinae
- Genus: Voluta
- Species: V. junghuhni

Binomial name
- Voluta junghuhni K. Martin, 1879

Species of gastropod

Voluta junghuhni is an extinct species of sea snail, a marine gastropod mollusk in the family Volutidae, the volutes.

== Distribution ==
Fossils of this marine species were found in Tertiary strata in Java, Indonesia.
