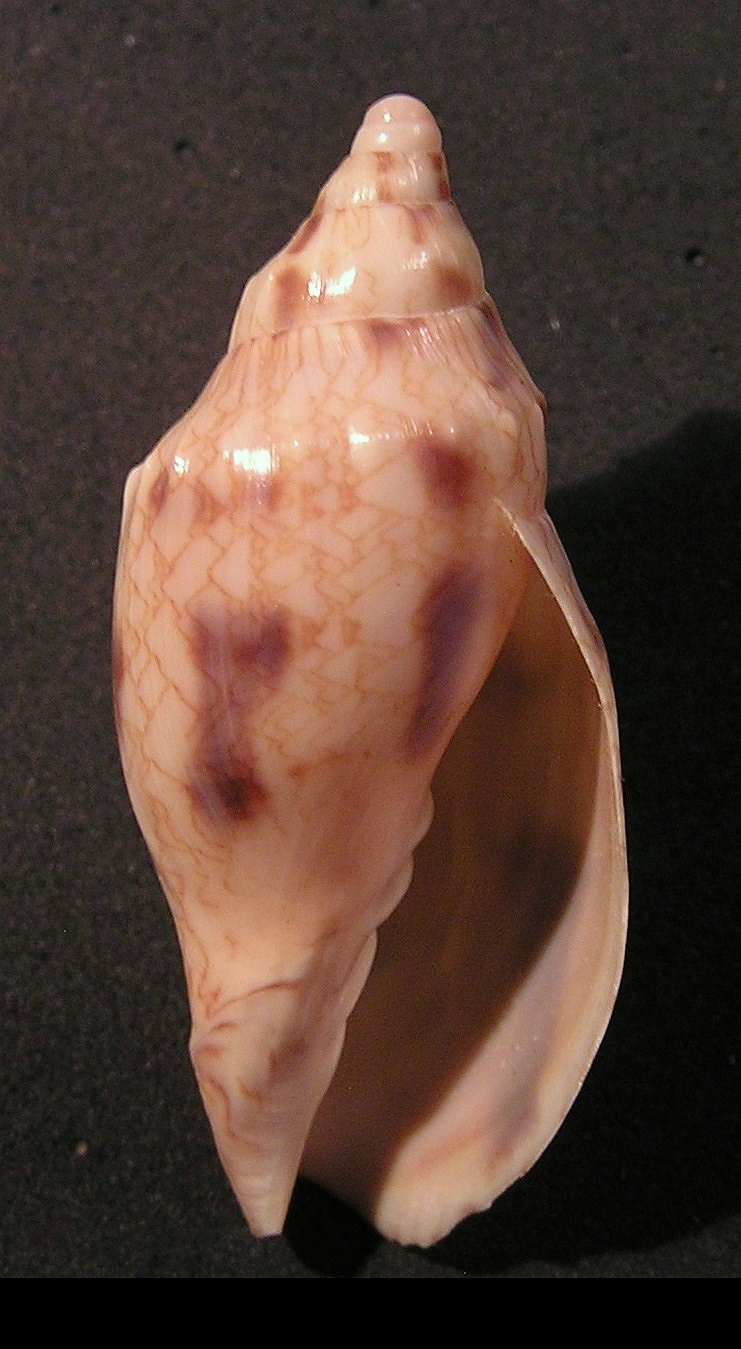
- Apertural view of Odontocymbiola americana

Scientific classification
- Kingdom: Animalia
- Phylum: Mollusca
- Class: Gastropoda
- Subclass: Caenogastropoda
- Order: Neogastropoda
- Family: Volutidae
- Genus: Odontocymbiola
- Species: O. americana

Binomial name
- Odontocymbiola americana (Reeve, 1856)

Synonyms
- Odontocymbiola macaensis Calvo & Coltro, 1997; Odontocymbiola saotomensis Calvo & Coltro, 1997; Voluta americana Reeve, 1856 (original combination)

= Odontocymbiola americana =

Species of gastropod

Odontocymbiola americana is a species of sea snail, a marine gastropod mollusc in the family Volutidae, the volutes.

Subspecies

- Odontocymbiola americana americana (Reeve, 1856)
- Odontocymbiola americana cleryana (Petit de la Saussaye, 1856) (synonym: Voluta cleryana Petit de la Saussaye, 1856)
- Odontocymbiola americana macaensis Calvo & Coltro, 1997
- Odontocymbiola americana saotomensis Calvo & Coltro, 1997

== Distribution ==
This marine species occurs off Brazil.
