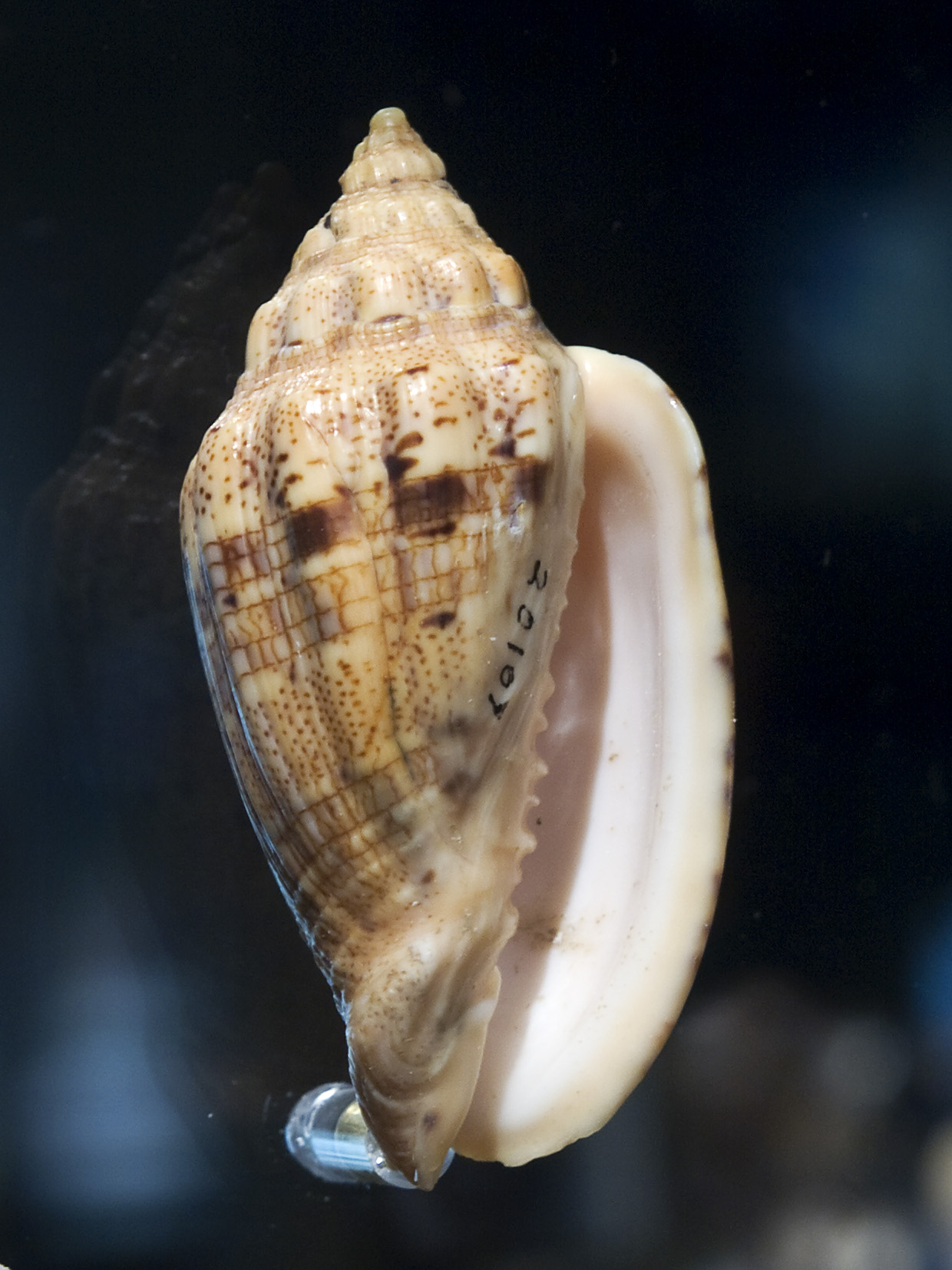
- A shell of Voluta polypleura

Scientific classification
- Kingdom: Animalia
- Phylum: Mollusca
- Class: Gastropoda
- Subclass: Caenogastropoda
- Order: Neogastropoda
- Family: Volutidae
- Genus: Voluta
- Species: V. polypleura

Binomial name
- Voluta polypleura Crosse, 1876

Synonyms
- Falsilyria bruneocincta Petuch, 2001; Falsilyria ernesti Petuch, 1990; Falsilyria garciai Petuch, 1981; Falsilyria garifuna Petuch, 200? Falsilyria hennequini Petuch, 1998; Falsilyria hilli Petuch, 1987; Falsilyria kotorai Petuch, 1981; Falsilyria sunderlandi Petuch, 1987; Voluta demarcoi Olsson, 1965

= Voluta polypleura =

Species of gastropod

Voluta polypleura is a species of medium-sized sea snail and a marine gastropod mollusk in the family Volutidae. It has the common name of De Marcoi's volute.

== Shell description ==
The maximum reported shell length for this species is 108 mm.

== Subspecies ==
Voluta polypleura contains the following subspecies:

- Voluta polypleura polypleura (Crosse, 1876).
- Voluta polypleura retemirabilis (Petuch, 1981).
