= Odontocymbiola pescalia =

Scientific classification
- Kingdom: Animalia
- Phylum: Mollusca
- Class: Gastropoda
- Subclass: Caenogastropoda
- Order: Neogastropoda
- Family: Volutidae
- Genus: Odontocymbiola
- Species: O. pescalia

Binomial name
- Odontocymbiola pescalia Clench & Turner, 1964

Synonyms
- Odontocymbiola rucciana Vazquez & Caldini, 1990

Species of gastropod

Odontocymbiola pescalia is a species of sea snail, a marine gastropod mollusc in the family Volutidae, the volutes.

== Description ==
This species attains a size of 80 mm.

== Distribution ==
Southern Atlantic Ocean: off Falkland Islands. 400-450 metres depth.
