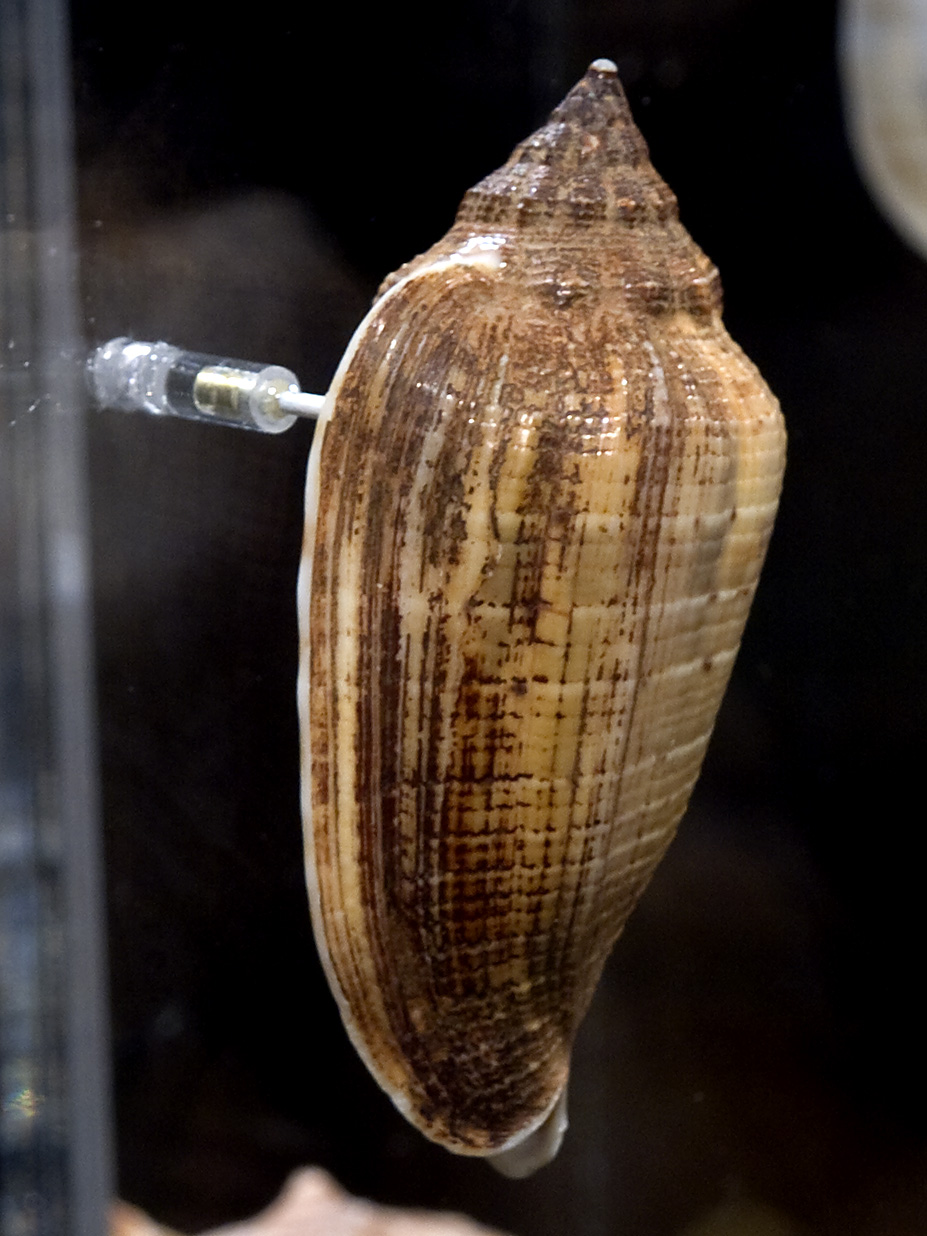
- A shell of Voluta virescens

Scientific classification
- Kingdom: Animalia
- Phylum: Mollusca
- Class: Gastropoda
- Subclass: Caenogastropoda
- Order: Neogastropoda
- Family: Volutidae
- Genus: Voluta
- Species: V. virescens

Binomial name
- Voluta virescens John Lightfoot, 1786

Synonyms
- Voluta polyzonalis Lamarck, 1811; Voluta pusio Swainson, 1823

= Voluta virescens =

Species of gastropod

Voluta virescens, common name the green music volute, is a species of medium-sized sea snail, a marine gastropod mollusk in the family Volutidae, the volutes.

== Description ==
The maximum reported shell length for this species is 114 mm.

Original description of Voluta virescens lindae: "Shell small for genus, stocky with wide, sharp-angled shoulder; shoulder ornamented with 10 large, point knobs; body whorl below shoulder (anterior to) heavily sculptured with large, well-developed, axial plications and numerous large spiral cords; axial plications and spiral cords intersect to produce reticulated, fenestrate sculpture pattern; outer lip flaring; shell color bright canary yellow with band of large tan checkers just below shoulder and numerous, pale tan patches scattered over body whorl; bright yellow and tan base color overlaid with 8 evenly-spaced, thin bands of dark brown and yellow dashes; areas between dashed bands covered with dense masses of pale tan dots; area between suture and shoulder characteristically smooth, copiously covered with evenly-spaced tan dots; protoconch very large in proportion to shell size, protracted, cylindrical in shape; protoconch bright yellow; columella and aperture yellow; columella with 11 plications."

== Subspecies ==
Voluta virescens contains the following subspecies:

- Voluta virescens lindae (Petuch, 1987)
- Voluta virescens virescens Lightfoot, 1786

== Distribution ==
Locus typicus of Voluta virescens lindae: "Off Bocas del Toro, Panama."
