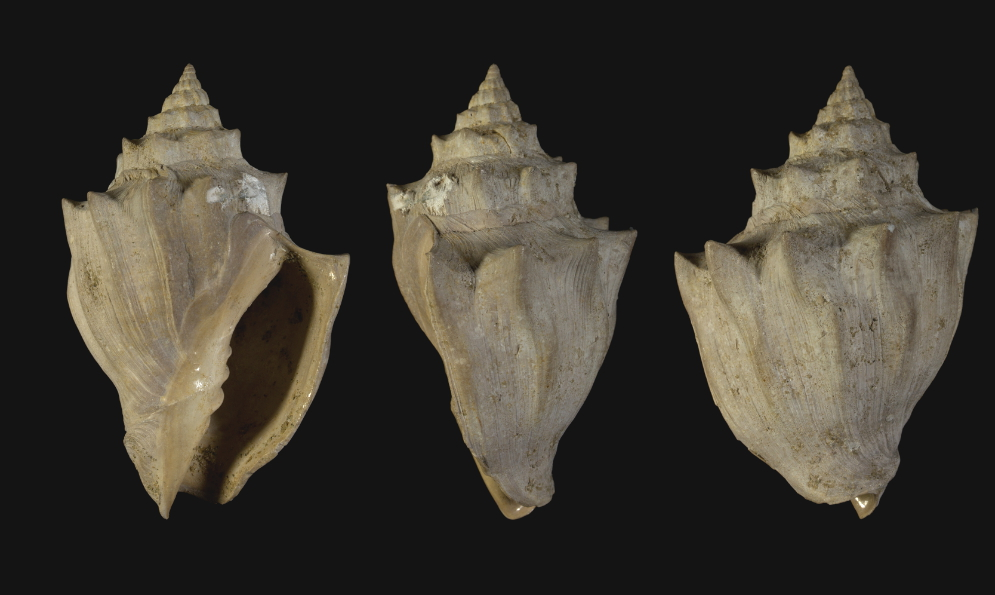
- Shell of †Voluta wateleti (specimen at MNHN, Paris)

Scientific classification
- Kingdom: Animalia
- Phylum: Mollusca
- Class: Gastropoda
- Subclass: Caenogastropoda
- Order: Neogastropoda
- Family: Volutidae
- Subfamily: Volutinae
- Genus: Voluta
- Species: †V. wateleti

Binomial name
- †Voluta wateleti Deshayes, 1865

Synonyms
- † Plejona wateleti (Deshayes, 1865); † Volutilithes wateleti (Deshayes, 1865)

= Voluta wateleti =

Species of gastropod

Voluta wateleti is an extinct species of sea snail, a marine gastropod mollusk in the family Volutidae, the volutes.

== Distribution ==
Fossils of this marine species were found in France
