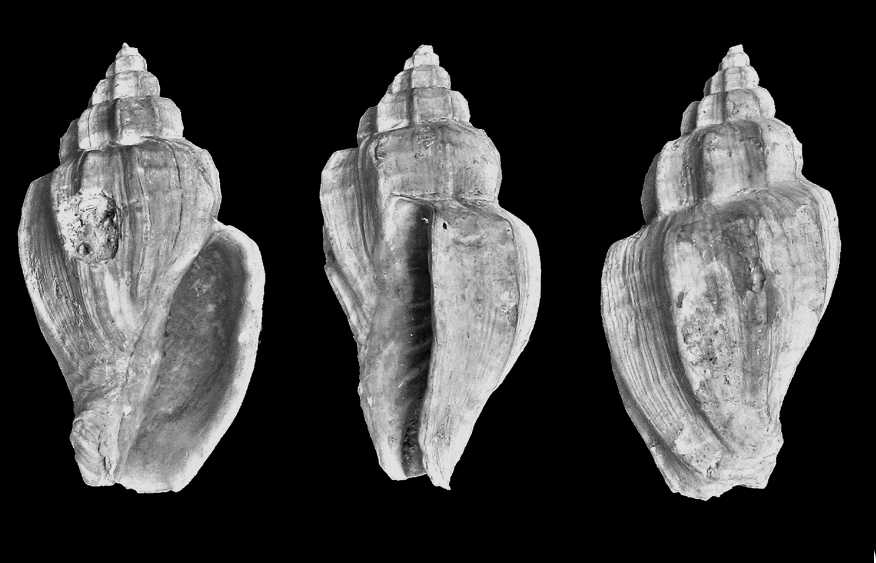
- Shell of † Voluta quinqueplicata (specimen at MNHN, Paris)

Scientific classification
- Kingdom: Animalia
- Phylum: Mollusca
- Class: Gastropoda
- Subclass: Caenogastropoda
- Order: Neogastropoda
- Family: Volutidae
- Subfamily: Volutinae
- Genus: Voluta
- Species: †V. quinqueplicata

Binomial name
- †Voluta quinqueplicata Bayan, 1870

Synonyms
- † Plejona quinqueplicata (Bayan, 1870); † Voluta heberti Deshayes, 1865; † Volutolyria quinqueplicata (Bayan, 1870); † Voluta deshayesi Sacco, 1890; † Volutilithes quinqueplicata (Bayan, 1870)

= Voluta quinqueplicata =

Species of gastropod

Voluta quinqueplicata is an extinct species of sea snail, a marine gastropod mollusk in the family Volutidae, the volutes.

== Distribution ==
Fossils of this marine species were found in Lutetian strata in France
