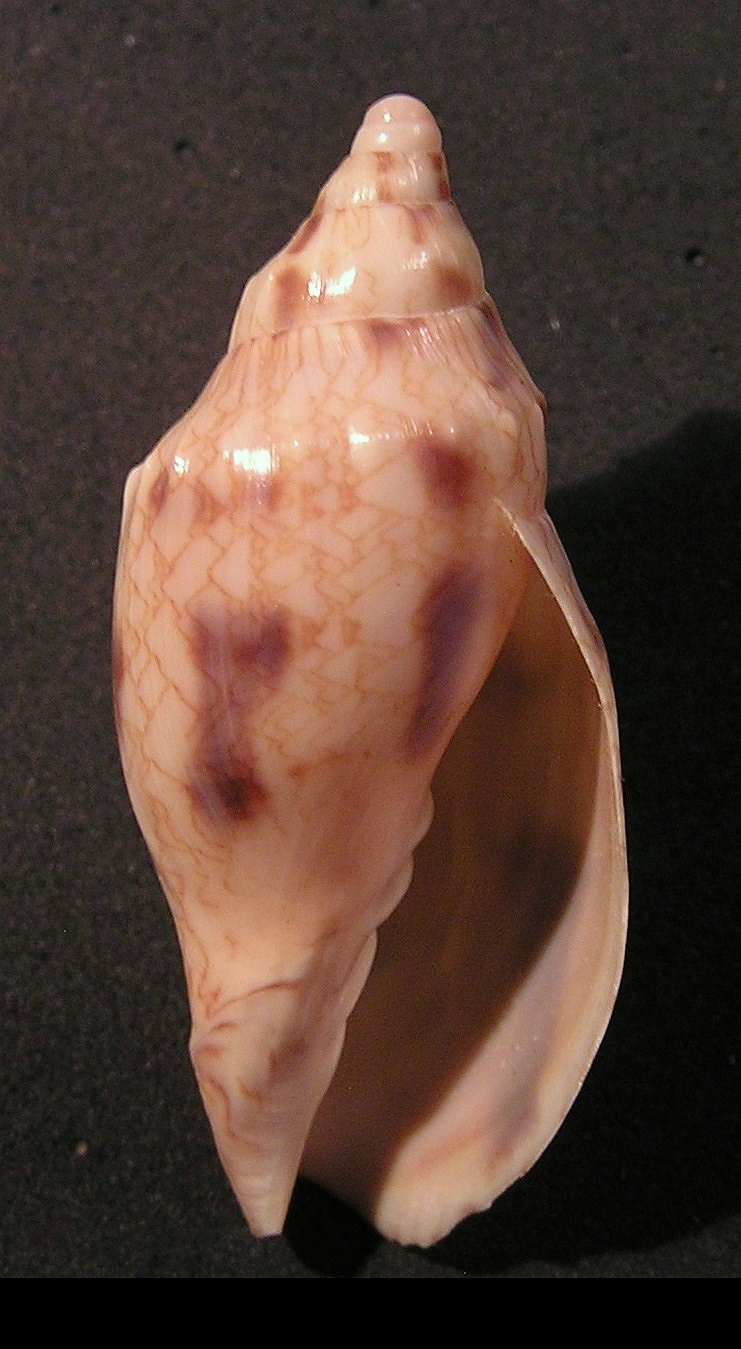
- Apertural view of Odontocymbiola americana (syntype at MNHN, Paris)

Scientific classification
- Kingdom: Animalia
- Phylum: Mollusca
- Class: Gastropoda
- Subclass: Caenogastropoda
- Order: Neogastropoda
- Family: Volutidae
- Genus: Odontocymbiola; Clench & Turner, 1964

Type species
- Voluta magellanica Gmelin, 1791

= Odontocymbiola =

Genus of gastropods

Odontocymbiola is a genus of sea snails, marine gastropod mollusks in the subfamily Cymbiinae of the family Volutidae.

== Description ==
The radula contain fang-like cusps.

== Species ==
Species within the genus Odontocymbiola include:

- Odontocymbiola americana (Reeve, 1856)
- Odontocymbiola diannae T. Cossignani, Allary & P. G. Stimpson, 2021
- Odontocymbiola magellanica (Gmelin, 1791)
- Odontocymbiola pescalia Clench & Turner, 1964
- Odontocymbiola simulatrix Leal & Bouchet, 1989

Species brought into synonymy

- Odontocymbiola canigiai Vasquez & Caldini, 1992: synonym of Odontocymbiola magellanica (Gmelin, 1791)
- Odontocymbiola rucciana Vazquez & Caldini, 1990: synonym of Odontocymbiola pescalia Clench & Turner, 1964
- Odontocymbiola subnodosa (Leach, 1814): synonym of Odontocymbiola magellanica (Gmelin, 1791)
