= Voluta hornesi =

Scientific classification
- Kingdom: Animalia
- Phylum: Mollusca
- Class: Gastropoda
- Subclass: Caenogastropoda
- Order: Neogastropoda
- Family: Volutidae
- Subfamily: Volutinae
- Genus: Voluta
- Species: V. hornesi

Binomial name
- Voluta hornesi Deshayes, 1865

Synonyms
- † Plejona hornesi (Deshayes, 1865) ·

Species of gastropod

Voluta hornesi is an extinct species of sea snail, a marine gastropod mollusk in the family Volutidae, the volutes.

== Description ==
The length of the shell attains 68 mm, its diameter is 25 mm.

== Distribution ==
Fossils of this marine species were found in France.
