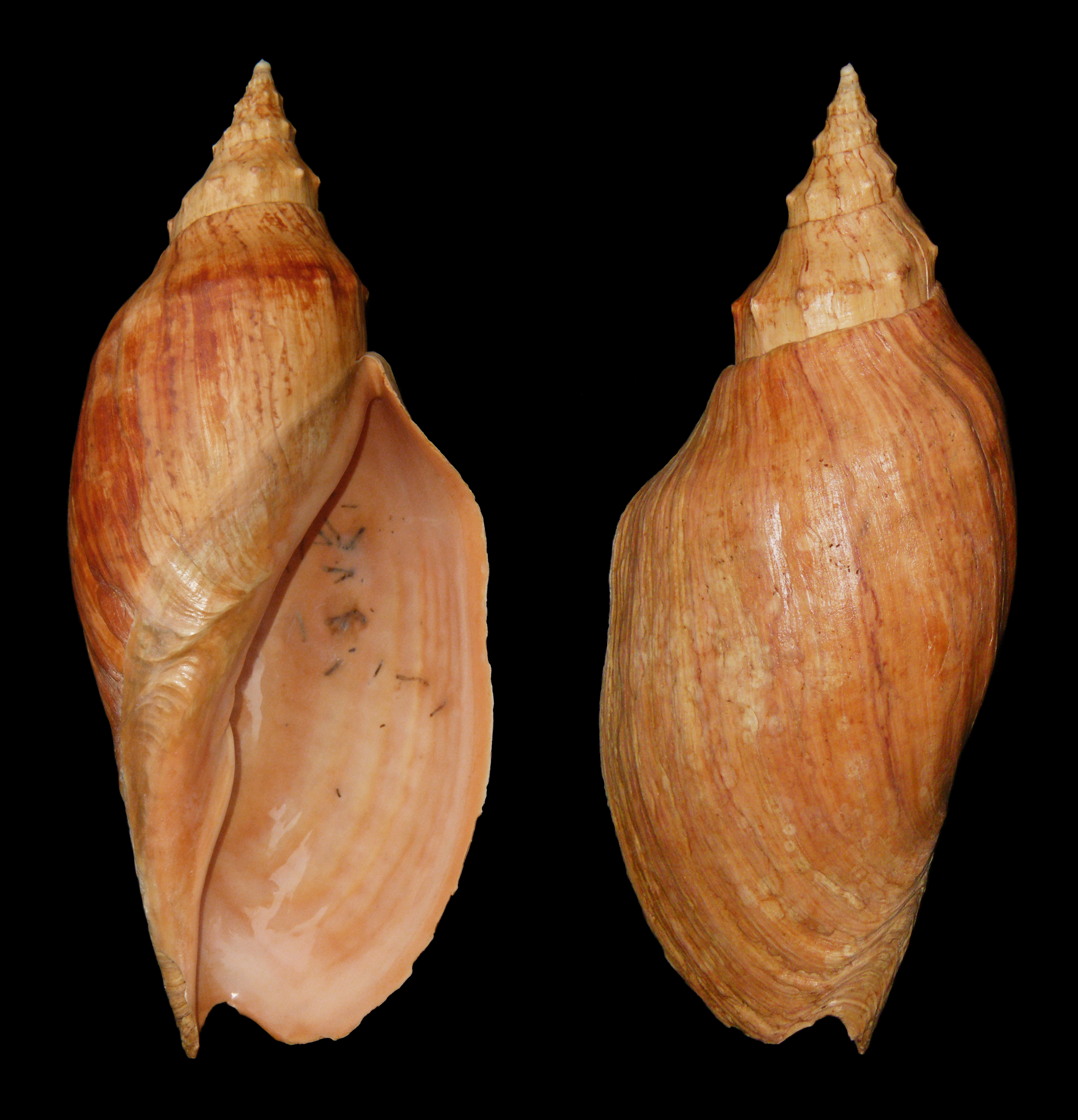
- shell of Adelomelon beckii

Scientific classification
- Kingdom: Animalia
- Phylum: Mollusca
- Class: Gastropoda
- Subclass: Caenogastropoda
- Order: Neogastropoda
- Family: Volutidae
- Genus: Adelomelon
- Species: A. beckii

Binomial name
- Adelomelon beckii (Broderip, 1836)

Synonyms
- Adelomelon indigestus Von Ihering, 1908; Adelomelon (Adelomelon) beckii (Broderip, 1836); Cymbiola becki (Broderip, 1836) superseded combination; Voluta festiva d'Orbigny, 1841; Voluta fusiformis Kiener, 1839

= Adelomelon beckii =

Species of gastropod

Adelomelon beckii, common name the Beck's volute, is a species of sea snail, a marine gastropod mollusk in the family Volutidae, the volutes.

== Description ==
The length of the shell varies between 150 mm and 510 mm.

(Original description in Latin) The shell is ovate-fusiform and tawny. It is inscribed with brownish-chestnut, slightly angular lines, and is transversely striated with minute, slightly undulating striae. The whorls are tuberculate and subtly plicate, with the body whorl being very long. The spire is of moderate height. The columella is triplicate, and the aperture is ovate-elongate.

== Distribution ==
This marine species occurs off the Atlantic coast of South America and off the Falkland Islands.
