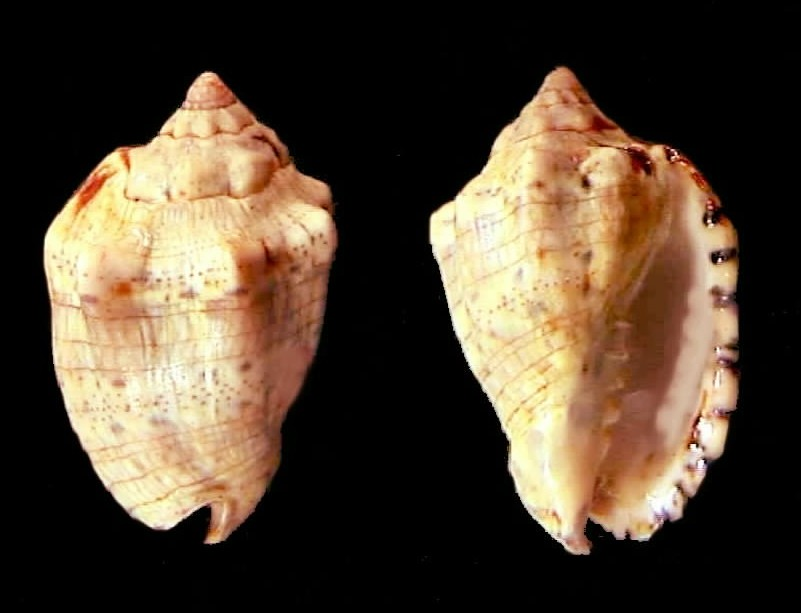

- Dorsal (left) and ventral (right) views of a shell of Voluta musica Voluta musica -orange deepwater variety of 'carneolata' from Barbados

Scientific classification
- Kingdom: Animalia
- Phylum: Mollusca
- Class: Gastropoda
- Subclass: Caenogastropoda
- Order: Neogastropoda
- Family: Volutidae
- Genus: Voluta
- Species: V. musica

Binomial name
- Voluta musica Linnaeus, 1758

= Voluta musica =

Species of gastropod

Voluta musica, common name the music volute, is a species of sea snail, a marine gastropod mollusk in the family Volutidae, the volutes.

== Synonyms ==
- Voluta bonay Berschauer & Ros. 2026
- Voluta caquetio Berschauer & Ros, 2025
- Voluta carneolata Lamarck, 1811
- Voluta chorea Röding, 1798
- Voluta confusa Röding, 1798
- Voluta damula Berschauer & Ros. 2026
- Voluta fulva Lamarck, 1811
- Voluta incarnata Röding, 1798
- Voluta laevigata Röding, 1798
- Voluta lineata Röding, 1798
- Voluta maculata Röding, 1798
- Voluta musica guineensis Dillwyn, 1817
- Voluta musica typica Dall, 1907
- Voluta muta Röding, 1798
- Voluta nodulosa Lamarck, 1822
- Voluta plicata Dillwyn, 1817
- Voluta reticulata Röding, 1798
- Voluta rosea Röding, 1798
- Voluta rugifera Dall, 1907
- Voluta sulcata Lamarck, 1811
- Voluta thiarella Lamarck, 1811
- Voluta tobagoensis Verrill, 1953
- Voluta tobagoensis var. damula Dall, 1907
- Voluta tobagoensis var. guinaica Lamarck, 1811
- Voluta turbata Röding, 1798
- Voluta violacea Lamarck, 1811

== Subspecies ==
- Voluta musica guineensis Dillwyn, 1817
- Voluta musica typica Dall, 1907

== Distribution ==
The species occurs on the mainland Caribbean coast in Colombia and Venezuela, and in the West Indies from the following islands or countries: Dominican Republic, Puerto Rico, Virgin Islands, St. Lucia, Barbados, St. Vincent and the Grenadines, Grenada, and Trinidad and Tobago.

== Shell description ==
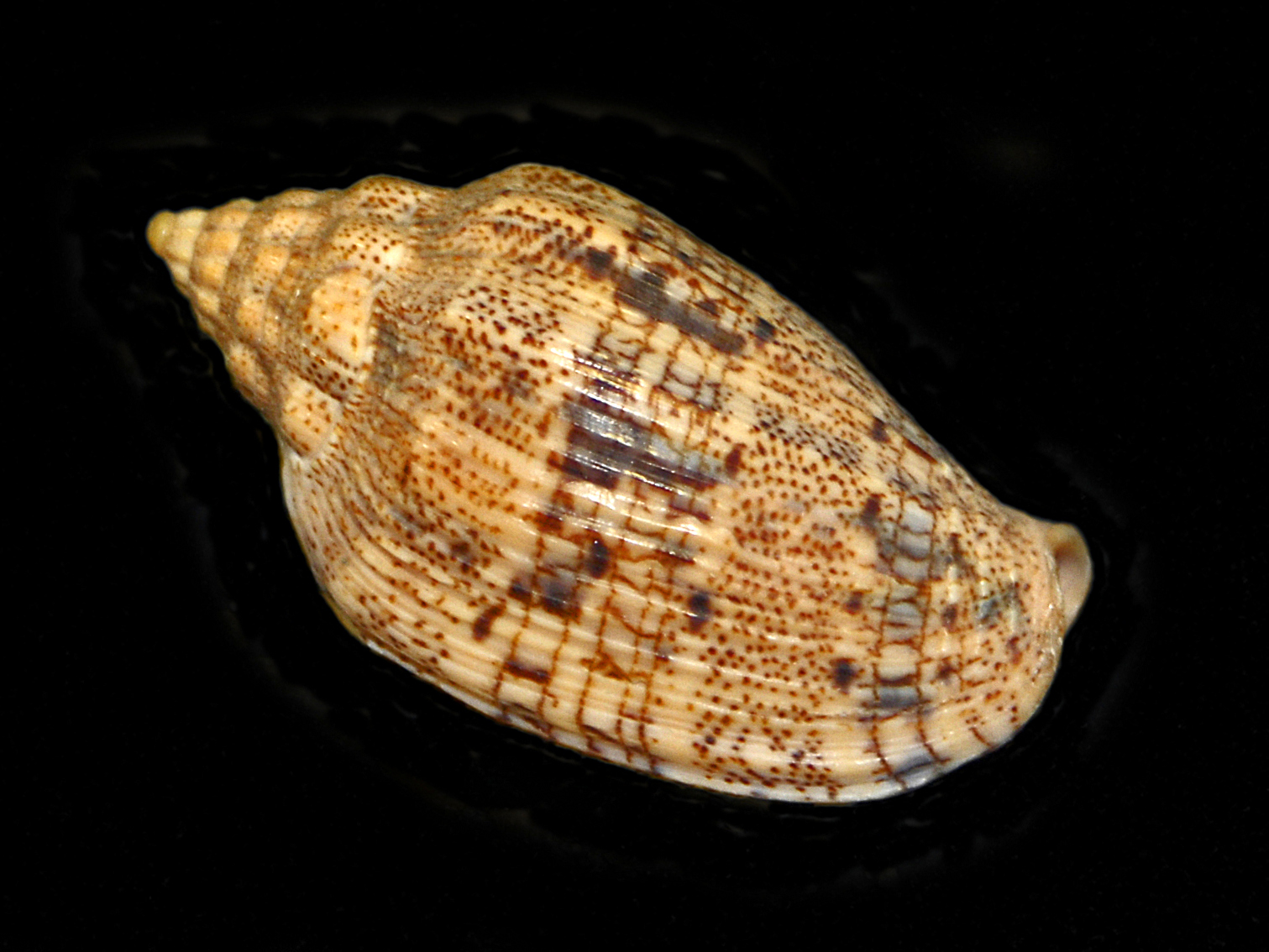
A shell of Voluta musica

The maximum reported size of the shell is 115 mm.

These medium-sized, very solid, axially ribbed shells are characterized by delicate blackish to reddish brown markings on a creamy background color, with a characteristic series of lines resembling a musical manuscript (hence the common name "music volute").

Specimens from the Eastern Caribbean island of Barbados are pink in color (var. "carneolata"). Deeper-water Barbados examples trapped alive at around 100 m. depth are orange in color.

Music Volute (Voluta bonay) crawling in the shallows on Bonaire (Caribbean Netherlands).

== Ecology ==
Voluta musica is usually found alive in muddy and sandy substrate at depths of 5 m to 28 m., although at Barbados this species has been found with their dorsums dry as they crawl across exposed South Coast reefs at very low tide and have been trapped alive at depths of about 100 m. along the island's West Coast.

It is a predatory carnivorous species, as is the case in other Volutidae. It feeds on invertebrates, bivalves, other gastropods and on decayed material.

== Life cycle ==
Embryos develop into free-swimming planktonic marine larvae (trochophore) and later into juvenile veligers.

== Bibliography ==
- Abbott, Robert Tucker (1974) - American Seashells: The Marine Mollusca of the Atlantic and Pacific Coasts of North America. 2nd ed. - Van Nostrand Reinhold Company New York
- Dall, W. H. 1907. A review of the American Volutidae Smithsonian Miscellaneous Collections 48 341–373.
- Linnaeus, C. (1758). Systema Naturae per regna tria naturae, secundum classes, ordines, genera, species, cum characteribus, differentiis, synonymis, locis. Editio decima, reformata. Laurentius Salvius: Holmiae
- Verrill, A. H. 1950. Voluta musica, its forms, distribution and operculum Conchological Club of Southern California, Minutes 102 3–7.
