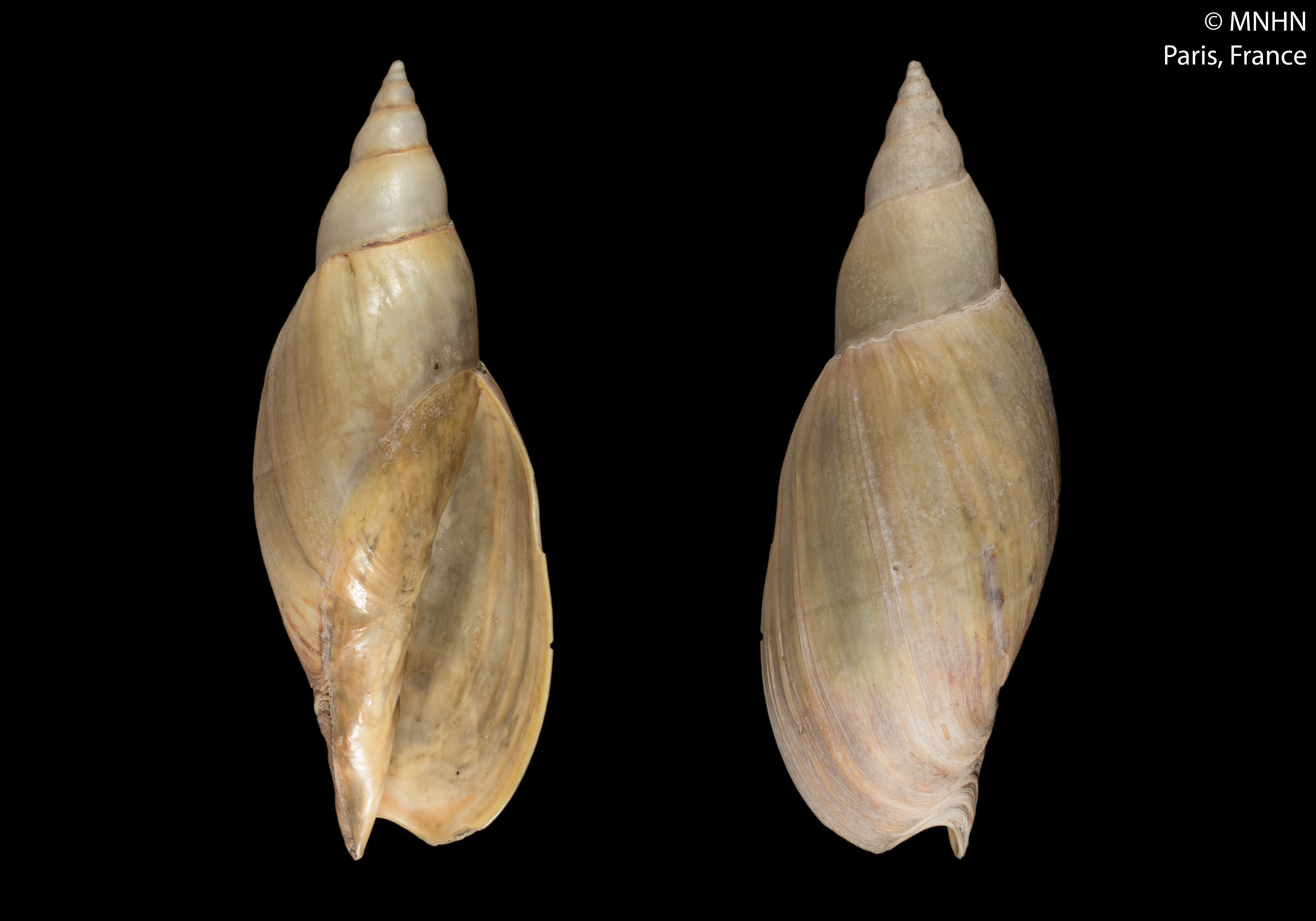
- Shell of Adelomelon ancilla (syntype at MNHN, Paris)

Scientific classification
- Kingdom: Animalia
- Phylum: Mollusca
- Class: Gastropoda
- Subclass: Caenogastropoda
- Order: Neogastropoda
- Family: Volutidae
- Genus: Adelomelon
- Species: A. ancilla

Binomial name
- Adelomelon ancilla (Lightfoot, 1786)

Synonyms
- Adelomelon barattinii Klappenbach & Ureta, 1966; Adelomelon (Adelomelon) ancilla (Lightfoot, 1786); Voluta ancilla Lightfoot, 1786 (basionym); Voluta arnheimi (Rivers, 1891); Voluta bracata Mabille & Rochebrune, 1889; Voluta magellanica Lamarck, 1811; Voluta martensi Strebel, 1906; Voluta spectabilis Gmelin, 1791

= Adelomelon ancilla =

Species of gastropod

Adelomelon ancilla is a species of sea snail, a marine gastropod mollusk in the family Volutidae, the volutes.

== Description ==
The length of the shell varies between 190 mm and 197 mm, its diameter between 64 mm and 67 mm.

(Described in Latin as Voluta bracata) The shell is oblong-fusiform, somewhat ventricose, and moderately thick. Its color is yellowish-brown, sometimes painted with reddish flames. The spire is conically elongated, with a papillary apex. It has seven somewhat convex whorls, and they are separated by a roughly submarginally-toothed suture. The body whorl is the largest, exceeding two-thirds of the total height. It is ovate-ventricose, strongly and longitudinally descending toward the aperture, and is slightly attenuated at the base. The aperture is elongated-oblong, is acute at the top, and is widely emarginated at the base. The peristome is subcontinuous. The outer lip is slightly incurved, acute, slightly thickened, and effuse. The columellar lip is somewhat straight, rounded, and is covered by a moderately thick plate originating from the insertion of the right margin and extending all the way to the base of the shell. The columella is three- or four-plicate.

== Distribution and habitat ==
This marine species occurs off Uruguay, Argentina, Chile, and Falkland Islands.
