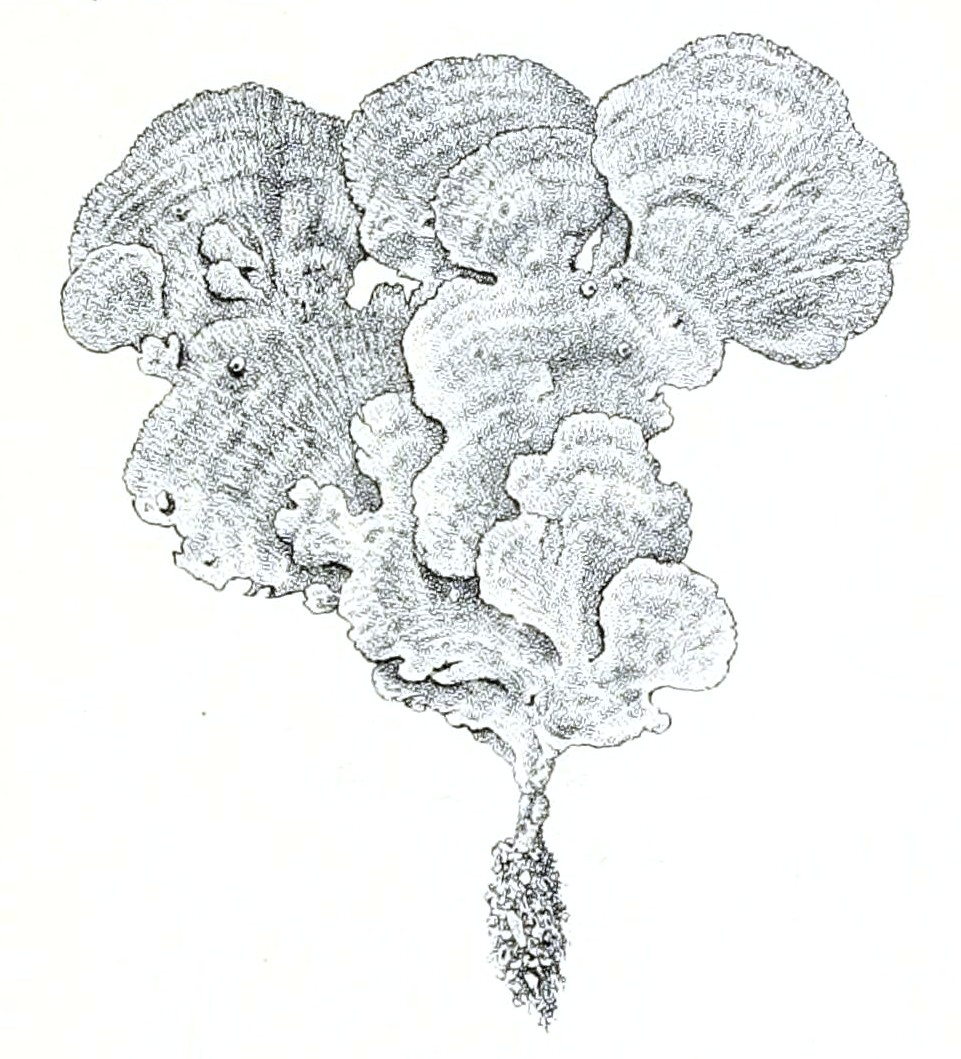
- Drawing of U. occidentalis from Børgesen, 1913-14

Scientific classification
- Clade: Viridiplantae
- Division: Chlorophyta
- Class: Ulvophyceae
- Order: Bryopsidales
- Family: Udoteaceae
- Genus: Udotea
- Species: U. occidentalis

Binomial name
- Udotea occidentalis A.Gepp & E.S.Gepp 1911

= Udotea occidentalis =

Species of alga

Udotea occidentalis is a species of photosynthetic macroalgae. It is commonly found in shallow waters of the Western Atlantic, from Florida to Brazil.
