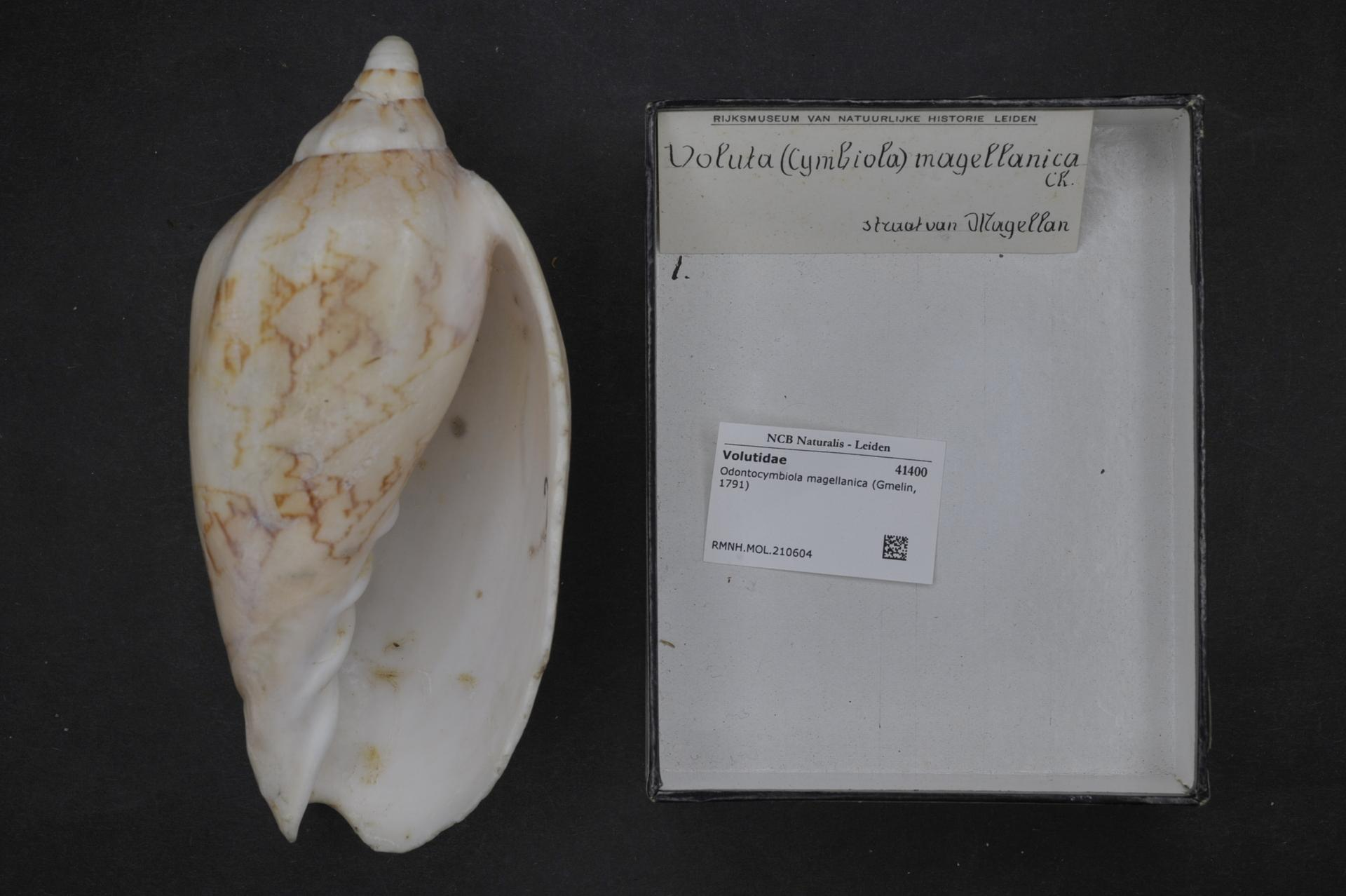

Scientific classification
- Kingdom: Animalia
- Phylum: Mollusca
- Class: Gastropoda
- Subclass: Caenogastropoda
- Order: Neogastropoda
- Family: Volutidae
- Genus: Odontocymbiola
- Species: O. magellanica

Binomial name
- Odontocymbiola magellanica (Gmelin, 1791)

Synonyms
- Odontocymbiola canigiai Vasquez & Caldini, 1992; Voluta ancilla Solander, 1839; Voluta mangeri Preston, 1901; Voluta paradoxa Lahille, 1895; Voluta subnodosa Leach, 1814; Voluta tuberculata Swainson, 1821

= Odontocymbiola magellanica =

Species of gastropod

Odontocymbiola magellanica, also known as the Magellan whelk or Magellan Venus, is a species of sea snail, a marine gastropod mollusc in the family Volutidae, the volutes. It is the largest extant species of volute in the world, reaching up to 35 cm (14 in) in shell length.

== Description ==
Odontocymbiola magellanica is found in the southern oceans, from Chile and Argentina south to the Falkland Islands and the Scotia Sea. It lives on the continental shelf and slope, at depths of 50 to 900 meters (160 to 2,950 ft).

The shell of Odontocymbiola magellanica is thick and heavy, with a glossy surface. It is typically white, cream, or yellow, with brown or purple markings. The aperture is large and oval, and the columella is smooth.

Odontocymbiola magellanica is a carnivorous snail that feeds on other mollusks, such as bivalves and cephalopods. It uses its radula, a ribbon-like tongue covered in teeth, to drill into the shells of its prey.

Odontocymbiola magellanica is a commercially important species in Chile and Argentina, where it is fished for its meat. However, overfishing has led to a decline in its population, and it is now considered to be a near threatened species by the IUCN.
