= List of species affected by imposex =

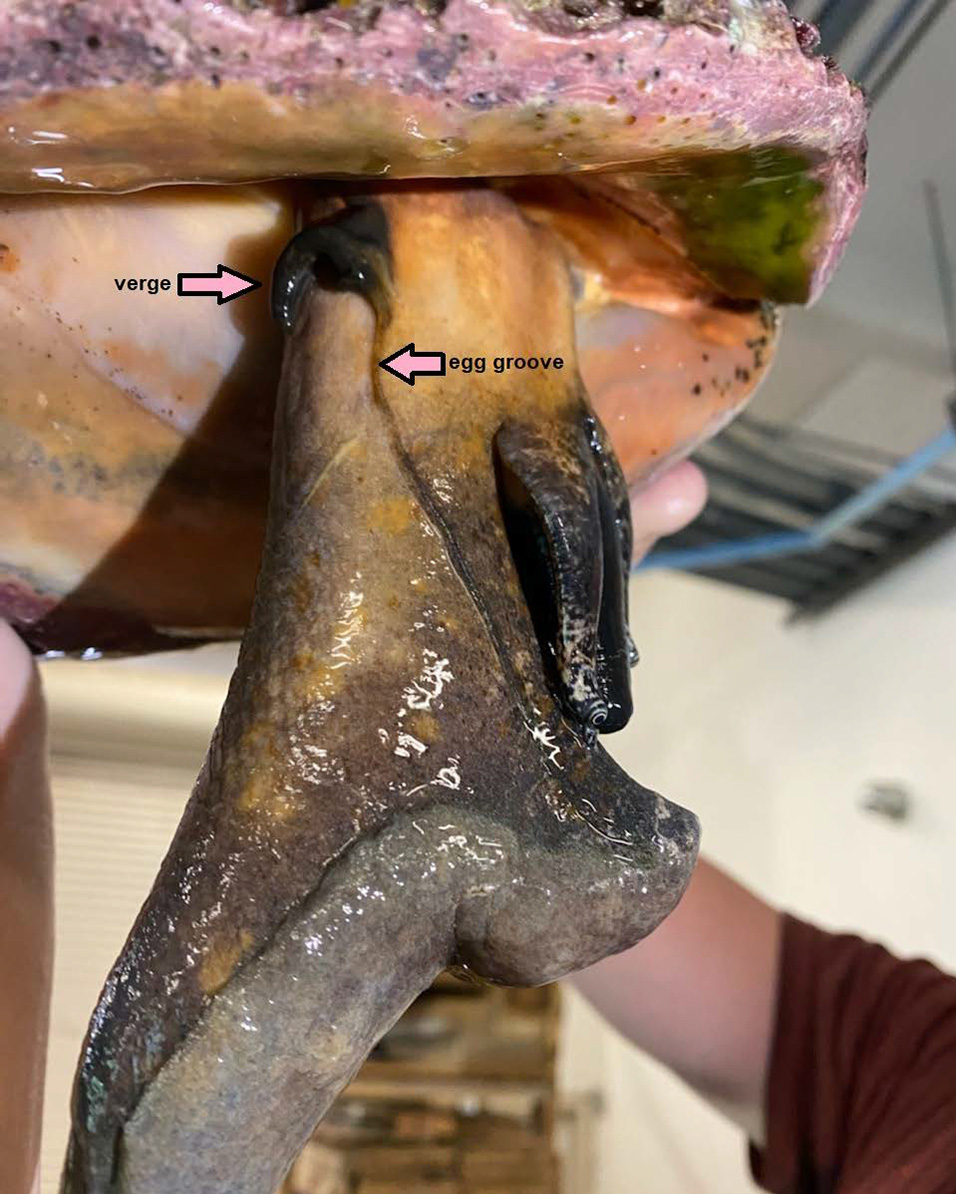
This female specimen of the queen conch, Aliger gigas, shows signs of imposex: it has developed a male sexual organ (verge) due to previous exposure to organotin compounds.

The list of species affected by imposex comprises gastropod species in which imposex, a condition affecting female specimens due to exposure to certain compounds, was recorded since it was first observed in the late 1960's. In the late 1970's, imposex had been recognized in at least 34 species. This number had increased to at least 100 species a decade later, and by 1994, it had been verified in females of at least 195 species worldwide. The records continued to increase to a total of 260 species in the following 15 years. The condition is known to affect marine, estuarine, and freshwater species from several families.

== List of species ==
=== Ampullariidae ===
- Marisa cornuarietis, the ramshorn apple snail
- Pomacea canaliculata, the golden apple snail
- Pomacea scalaris

=== Buccinanopsidae ===
- Buccinanops cochlidium
- Buccinanops monilifer
- Buccinastrum deforme, the collared buccinum

=== Columbellidae ===
- Amphissa columbiana, the wrinkled dove snail
- Astyris lunata
- Costoanachis avara, the greedy dove shell

=== Cominellidae ===
- Cominella virgata
- Pareuthria fuscata

=== Conidae ===
- Conasprella jaspidea, the Jasper cone
- Conus ventricosus, the Mediterranean cone

=== Fasciolariidae ===
- Leucozonia nassa
- Taron dubius
- Triplofusus giganteus, the Florida horse conch

=== Littorinidae ===
- Littoraria angulifera, the mangrove periwinkle
- Littorina sitkana

=== Melongenidae ===
- Melongena melongena, the Caribbean crown conch
- Pugilina tupiniquim

=== Muricidae ===
- Bedeva vinosa
- Bolinus brandaris the purple dye murex
- Calotrophon ostrearum, the mauve-mouth drill
- Ceratostoma foliatum the leafy hornmouth
- Chicoreus brevifrons, the West Indian murex
- Chicoreus florifer, the flowery lace murex
- Dicathais orbita, the white rock shell
- Drupella rugosa, the rugose drupe
- Drupella margariticola, the shouldered castor bean
- Eupleura caudata
- Eupleura sulcidentata, the sharp-ribbed drill
- Eupleura tampaensis
- Haustrum haustorium, the dark rock shell
- Haustrum scobina, the oyster borer
- Hexaplex trunculus, the banded dye-murex
- Nucella canaliculata, the channeled dog winkle
- Nucella emarginata the emarginate dogwinkle
- Nucella lamellosa, the frilled dog winkle
- Nucella lapillus, the dog whelk
- Nucella lima the file dog winkle
- Ocenebra erinaceus, the European sting winkle
- Paciocinebrina lurida, the dwarf lurid triton
- Phyllonotus margaritensis, the Margarita Murex
- Phyllonotus pomum, the apple murex
- Plicopurpura pansa
- Plicopurpura patula, a muricid snail
- Purpura panama, the salmon-lipped whelk
- Stramonita brasiliensis, the Brazilian red-mouthed rock shell
- Stramonita canaliculata
- Stramonita rustica
- Rapana venosa, the veined rapa whelk
- Reishia clavigera, a rock snail
- Reishia luteostoma, a rock snail
- Tenguella musiva, the mosaic purpura
- Tenguella marginalba, the mulberry whelk
- Thaisella chocolata
- Thaisella coronata
- Trophon geversianus, the Gever's trophon
- Tylothais aculeata
- Urosalpinx cinerea, the eastern oyster drill
- Vasula deltoidea
- Vokesinotus perrugatus
- Xanthochorus buxeus
- Xymenopsis muriciformis
- Zeatrophon ambiguus, the large trophon

=== Nassariidae ===
- Ilyanassa obsoleta, the eastern mud snail
- Phrontis vibex, the bruised nassa
- Tritia reticulata, the netted dog whelk

=== Strombidae ===
- Aliger gigas, the queen conch
- Laevistrombus canarium, the dog conch
- Strombus pugilis, the fighting conch

=== Volutidae ===
- Adelomelon ancilla
- Adelomelon beckii, Beck's volute
- Voluta ebraea, the Hebrew volute
- Voluta musica, the music volute
- Odontocymbiola magellanica
- Pachycymbiola brasiliana
- Pachycymbiola ferussacii

=== Olividae ===
- Callianax biplicata, the purple dwarf olive
- Olivancillaria deshayesiana
- Olivancillaria vesica
- Olivella minuta

=== Other families ===
- Amalda australis, the southern olive
- Babylonia areolata, a babyloniid sea snail
- Bostrycapulus odites, a slipper snail
- Hastula cinerea
- Heleobia australis
- Monoplex parthenopeus, the giant hairy triton
- Monodonta labio, the toothed top shell
- Nerita exuvia, the snakeskin nerite
- Prunum martini
