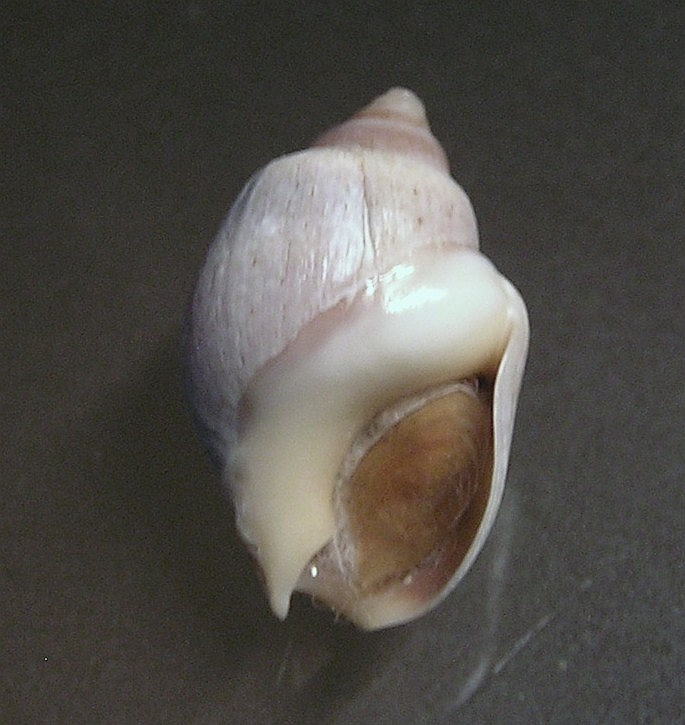
- Apertural view of a shell of Buccinanops deformis

Scientific classification
- Kingdom: Animalia
- Phylum: Mollusca
- Class: Gastropoda
- Subclass: Caenogastropoda
- Order: Neogastropoda
- Superfamily: Buccinoidea
- Family: Buccinanopsidae
- Genus: Buccinanops d'Orbigny, 1841

Type species
- Buccinum cochlidium Dillwyn, 1817

= Buccinanops =

Genus of gastropods

Buccinanops is a genus of sea snails, marine gastropod mollusks in the family Buccinanopsidae, the Nassa mud snails or dog whelks and the like.

== Species ==
- Buccinanops cochlidium (Dillwyn, 1817)
- Buccinanops latus Pastorino & Simone, 2021
- Buccinanops monilifer (Kiener, 1834)

Species brought into synonymy

- Buccinanops deformis (King, 1832): synonym of Buccinastrum deforme (P. P. King, 1832)
- Buccinastrum duartei Klappenbach, 1961: synonym of Buccinastrum duartei (Klappenbach, 1961) (original combination)
- Buccinanops globulosus (Kiener, 1834): synonym of Buccinastrum deforme (P. P. King, 1832)
- Buccinanops gradatus (Deshayes, 1844): synonym of Buccinanops cochlidium (Dillwyn, 1817)
- Buccinanops lamarckii (Kiener, 1834): synonym of Buccinanops cochlidium (Dillwyn, 1817)
- Buccinanops paytensis (Kiener, 1834): synonym of Buccinastrum paytense (Kiener, 1834)
- Buccinanops uruguayensis (Pilsbry, 1897): synonym of Buccinastrum uruguayense (Pilsbry, 1897)
- Buccinanops validus (Dunker, 1852): synonym of Pusionella valida (Dunker, 1852)
- Buccinanops vittatus (Linnaeus, 1767): synonym of Bullia vittata (Linnaeus, 1767)
