= Chicoreus bullisi =

Scientific classification
- Kingdom: Animalia
- Phylum: Mollusca
- Class: Gastropoda
- Subclass: Caenogastropoda
- Order: Neogastropoda
- Family: Muricidae
- Genus: Chicoreus
- Species: C. bullisi

Binomial name
- Chicoreus bullisi Vokes, 1974

Synonyms
- Chicoreus bullisi Vokes, 1974; Chicoreus hilli Petuch, 1990

Species of gastropod

Chicoreus bullisi is a species of sea snail, a marine gastropod mollusk belonging to the family Muricidae, the murex snails or rock snails. The species was named for American marine biologist Harvey R. Bullis, Jr.

== Description ==
Chicoreus bullisi has a large shell. The holotype was measured at 65mm in height and 31.5mm in diameter (excluding spines). It is similar to Chicoreus florifer, but may be distinguished by its spines. It also lives in deeper water (75 to 100 fathoms) than C. florifer and C. brevifrons, which are the other Chicoreus species that live in the area.

== Occurrence ==
Chicoreus bullisi has been found off of the Caribbean coast of Nicaragua.
