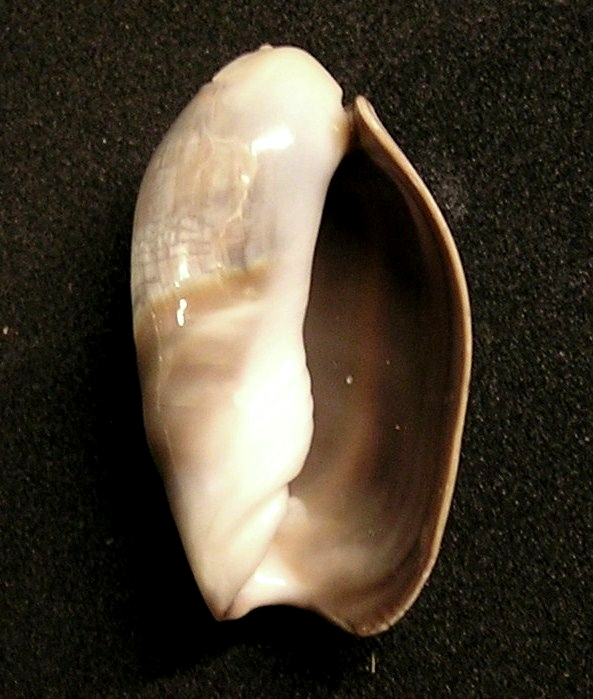
- Apertural view of a shell of Olivancillaria vesica

Scientific classification
- Kingdom: Animalia
- Phylum: Mollusca
- Class: Gastropoda
- Subclass: Caenogastropoda
- Order: Neogastropoda
- Superfamily: Olivoidea
- Family: Olividae
- Genus: Olivancillaria d'Orbigny, 1839

Type species
- Voluta oliva Linnaeus, 1758

Synonyms
- Lintricula H. Adams & A. Adams, 1853; Scaphula Swainson, 1840 (Invalid: junior homonym of Scaphula Benson, 1834 [Bivalvia]; Lintricula is a replacement name)

= Olivancillaria =

Genus of gastropods

Olivancillaria is a genus of sea snails, marine gastropod mollusks in the subfamily Olivancillariinae of the family Olividae.

== Description ==
Animal: The head and tentacles are concealed. The mantle shows a large, thick, fleshy appendage behind. The foot is very voluminous, runcate posteriorly. The shield has very large and rounded side-lobes.

The operculum is distinct, half-ovate with an subapical nucleus.

Shell: The shell is smooth and oblong. The spire is short with the suture not canaliculated to the apex. The aperture is moderate. The columella shows two or three oblique plaits anteriorly, and has a large callosity posteriorly.

== Species ==
Species within the genus Olivancillaria include:

- Olivancillaria auricularia (Lamarck, 1811)
- Olivancillaria carcellesi Klappenbach, 1965
- † Olivancillaria claneophila (Duclos, 1840)
- Olivancillaria contortuplicata (Reeve, 1850)
- Olivancillaria deshayesiana (Ducros de Saint Germain, 1857)
- Olivancillaria orbignyi (Marrat, 1868)
- Olivancillaria teaguei Klappenbach, 1964
- Olivancillaria urceus (Röding, 1798)
- Olivancillaria vesica (Gmelin, 1791)

Species brought into synonymy

- Olivancillaria brasiliana (Lamarck, 1811): synonym of Olivancillaria urceus (Röding, 1798)
- Olivancillaria buckuporum Thomé, 1966: synonym of Olivancillaria carcellesi Klappenbach, 1965
- Olivancillaria brasiliana (Lamarck, 1811): synonym of Olivancillaria urceus (Röding, 1798)
- Olivancillaria millepunctata (Duclos, 1840): synonym of Olivella millepunctata (Duclos, 1835)
- Olivancillaria nana (Lamarck, 1811): synonym of Olivella nana (Lamarck, 1811)
- Olivancillaria steeriae (Reeve, 1850): synonym of Agaronia steeriae (Reeve, 1850)
- Olivancillaria uretai Klappenbach, 1965: synonym of Olivancillaria orbignyi (Marrat, 1868)
- Olivancillaria zenopira (Duclos, 1835): synonym of Olivella nana (Lamarck, 1811)
