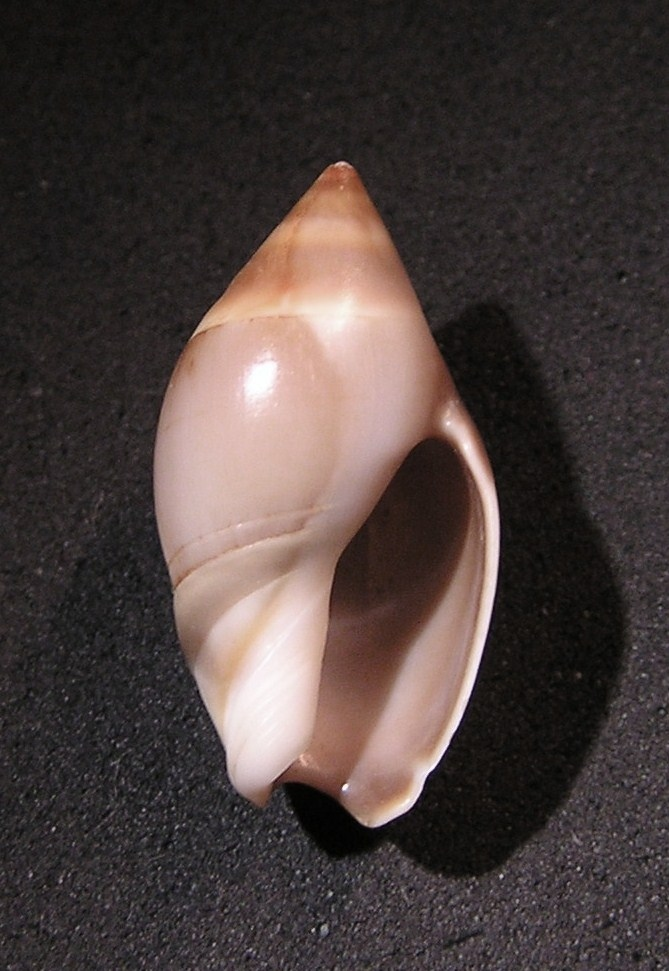
- Apertural view of a shell of Amalda depressa

Scientific classification
- Kingdom: Animalia
- Phylum: Mollusca
- Class: Gastropoda
- Subclass: Caenogastropoda
- Order: Neogastropoda
- Family: Ancillariidae
- Genus: Amalda
- Species: A. depressa

Binomial name
- Amalda depressa (G.B. Sowerby II, 1859)

Synonyms
- Amalda (Baryspira) depressa (Sowerby, G.B. II, 1859); Ancillaria depressa G.B. Sowerby II, 1859 (original combination); † Ancillaria lata F. W. Hutton, 1885 (junior subjective synonym); Baryspira (Pinguispira) depressa (G. B. Sowerby II, 1859) unaccepted (superseded combination); Baryspira depressa (G.B. Sowerby II, 1859)

= Amalda depressa =

Species of gastropod

Amalda depressa, common name the depressed ancilla, is a species of a small sea snail, a marine gastropod mollusc in the family Ancillariidae.

== Description ==
The length of the shell varies between 11 mm and 26 mm.

(Original description) The spire is shorter than in Amalda australis, and the thickened callus of the columella and spire gives greater width to the top.

== Distribution ==
This marine species is endemic to and occurs off New Zealand.
