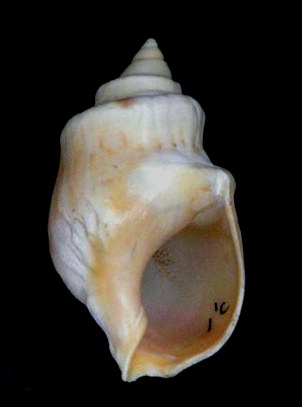
- Apertural view of a shell of Buccinanops cochlidium

Scientific classification
- Kingdom: Animalia
- Phylum: Mollusca
- Class: Gastropoda
- Subclass: Caenogastropoda
- Order: Neogastropoda
- Family: Buccinanopsidae
- Genus: Buccinanops
- Species: B. cochlidium

Binomial name
- Buccinanops cochlidium (Dillwyn, 1817)

Synonyms
- Buccinanops gradatus (Deshayes, 1844); Buccinanops lamarckii (Kiener, 1834); Buccinum cochlidium auct. (misidentification); Buccinum cochlidium Dillwyn, 1817 (original combination); Buccinum gradatum Deshayes, 1844; Buccinum lamarckii Kiener, 1834; Bullia gradata (Deshayes, 1844); Bullia gradata pampeana Ihering, 1907

= Buccinanops cochlidium =

Species of gastropod

Buccinanops cochlidium, common name the gradated bullia, is a species of sea snail, a marine gastropod mollusk in the family Nassariidae, the Nassa mud snails or dog whelks.

== Description ==
The size of the shell varies between 30 mm and 112 mm.

The ovate-conical shell is elongated, smooth, and shining. It is of a reddish yellow color, scattered over with longitudinal flames of a brown red. A transverse band of the same color surrounds the base of the shell. The spire is elongated and composed of eight whorls slightly angular at their upper part, and very slightly convex. The first whorls are plaited longitudinally . The aperture is ovate, whitish, and strongly emarginated at its base. The outer lip is thin. The columella is smooth and yellowish.

This handsome species is particularly remarkable by the turreted whorls, and above all by an original deposit of whiter calcareous matter, which is seen at the upper part of the lower whorls of the shell.

== Distribution ==
This marine species occurs from Central Brazil to Argentina
