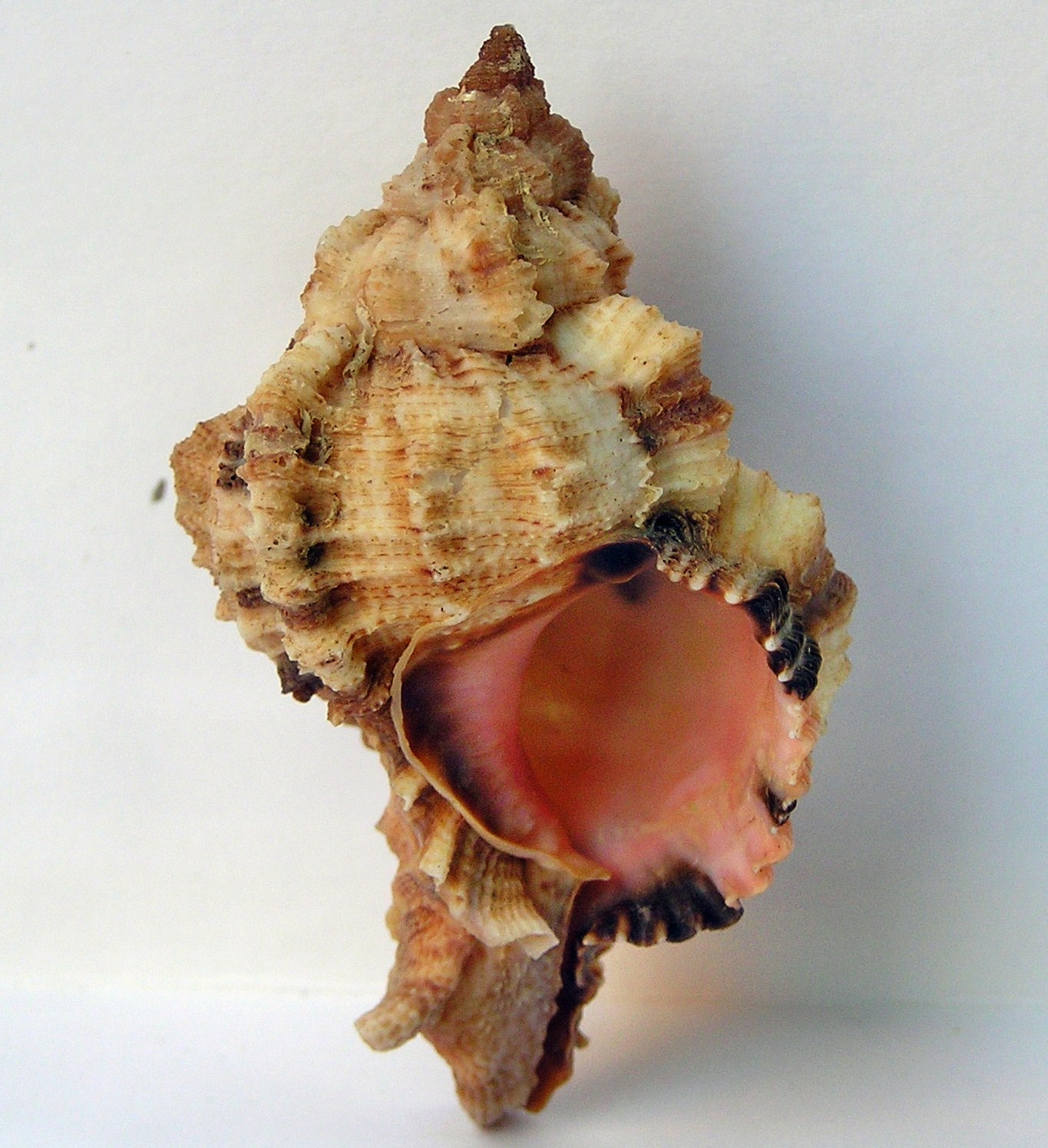
- Apertural view of Phyllonotus pomum

Scientific classification
- Kingdom: Animalia
- Phylum: Mollusca
- Class: Gastropoda
- Subclass: Caenogastropoda
- Order: Neogastropoda
- Superfamily: Muricoidea
- Family: Muricidae
- Subfamily: Muricinae
- Genus: Phyllonotus; Swainson, 1833

Type species
- Murex imperialis Swainson, W.A., 1833

Synonyms
- Chicoreus (Phyllonotus) Swainson, 1833; † Hexaplex (Phyllonotus) Swainson, 1833 superseded rank; Murex (Phyllonotus) Swainson, 1833 (original rank); Muricidea (Phyllonotus) Swainson, 1833 superseded rank

= Phyllonotus =

Genus of gastropods

Phyllonotus is a genus of medium to large sized predatory sea snails. These are carnivorous marine gastropod molluscs in the family Muricidae, the murexes or rock snails.

In 2011 Phyllonotus was raised to the status of genus from its former state as subgenus of Chicoreus

== Species ==
- Phyllonotus bellettii Petuch, Berschauer & C. L. Powell, 2024 (uncertain > taxon inquirendum)
- Phyllonotus erythrostomus (Swainson, 1831)
- † Phyllonotus evergladesensis Petuch, 1994
- Phyllonotus eversoni (D'Attilio, Myers & Shasky, 1987)
- Phyllonotus feliciae Berschauer & Petuch, 2025
- Phyllonotus globosus Emmons, 1858
- Phyllonotus guyanensis Garrigues & Lamy, 2016
- † Phyllonotus labelleensis Petuch, 1994
- Phyllonotus margaritensis (Abbott, 1958)
- † Phyllonotus martinshugari Petuch, 1994
- Phyllonotus mexicanus (Petit de la Saussaye, 1852)
- † Phyllonotus mississippiensis (Conrad, 1847)
- Phyllonotus oculatus (Reeve, 1845)
- Phyllonotus peratus Keen, 1960
- Phyllonotus pomum (Gmelin, 1791)
- Phyllonotus regius (Swainson, 1821)
- Phyllonotus salutensis Garrigues & Lamy, 2016
- † Phyllonotus sampajauensis (Beets, 1986)
- † Phyllonotus trophoniformis (Heilprin, 1887)
- Phyllonotus whymani Petuch & Sargent, 2011

Species brought into synonymy

- Phyllonotus acanthophora A. Adams, 1863: synonym of Ocenebra acanthophora (A. Adams, 1863)
- Phyllonotus coronatus A. Adams, 1863 (nomen dubium): synonym of Pteropurpura (Ocinebrellus) falcata (G.B. Sowerby II, 1834)
- Phyllonotus brassica (Lamarck, 1822) accepted as Hexaplex brassica (Lamarck, 1822)
- Phyllonotus duplex (Röding, 1798): synonym of Hexaplex duplex (Röding, 1798)
- Phyllonotus superbus (G.B. owerby III, 1889): synonym of Chicomurex superbus (G.B. Sowerby III, 1889)
- Phyllonotus trunculus (Linnaeus, 1758): synonym of Hexaplex trunculus (Linnaeus, 1758)
- Phyllonotus unifasciatus A. Adams, 1863 (nomen dubium): synonym of Pteropurpura (Ocinebrellus) falcata (G.B. Sowerby II, 1834)
