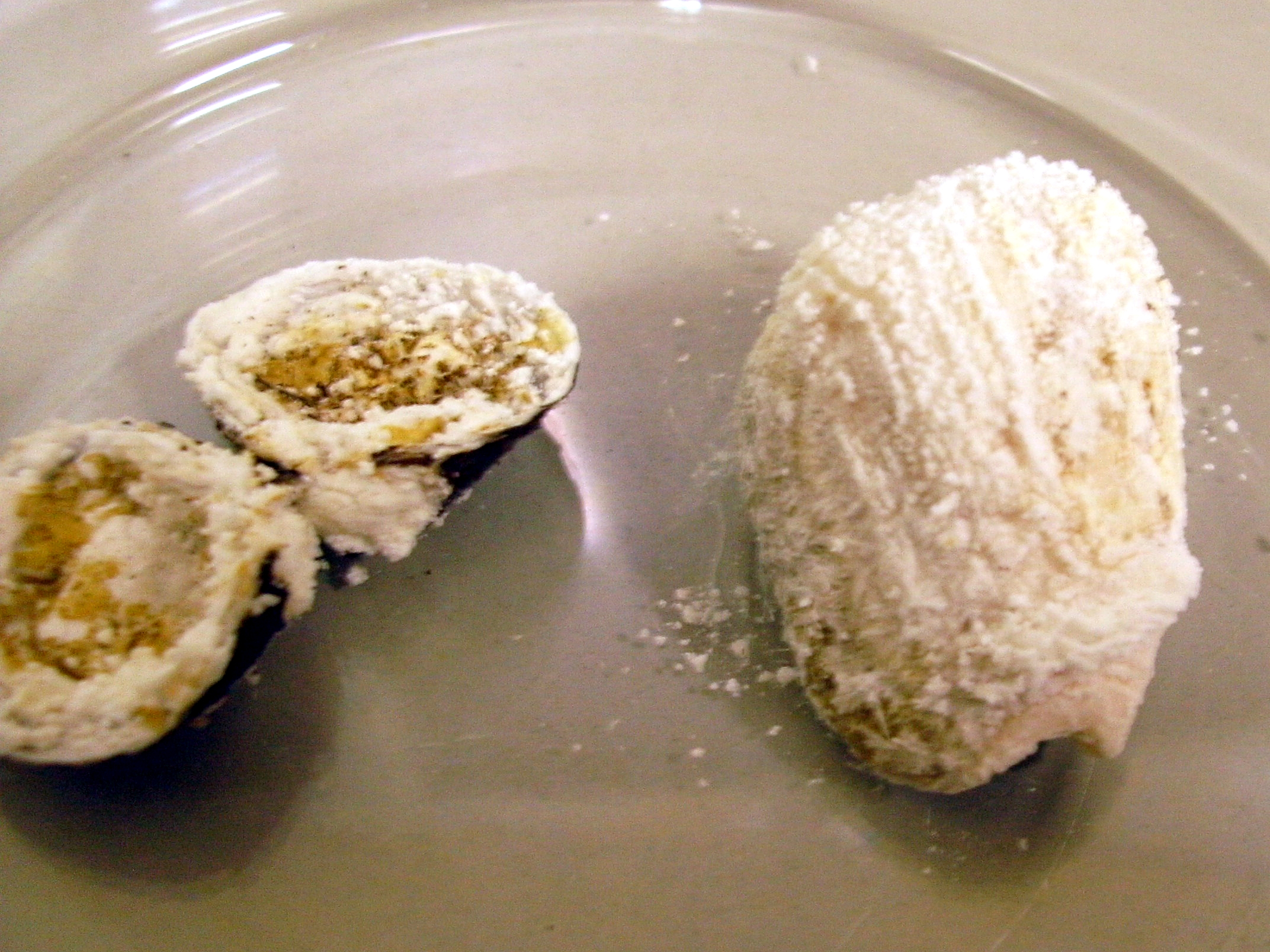

Scientific classification
- Kingdom: Animalia
- Phylum: Mollusca
- Class: Gastropoda
- Subclass: Caenogastropoda
- Order: Neogastropoda
- Family: Olividae
- Genus: Olivancillaria
- Species: O. urceus

Binomial name
- Olivancillaria urceus (Röding, 1798)

= Olivancillaria urceus =

Species of gastropod

Olivancillaria urceus is a species of sea snail, a marine gastropod mollusk in the family Olividae, the olives.

== Distribution ==
O. urceus is endemic to the South American coastline, from Brazil to Uruguay.
