= Phyllonotus eversoni =

Scientific classification
- Kingdom: Animalia
- Phylum: Mollusca
- Class: Gastropoda
- Subclass: Caenogastropoda
- Order: Neogastropoda
- Family: Muricidae
- Genus: Phyllonotus
- Species: P. eversoni

Binomial name
- Phyllonotus eversoni (D'Attilio, Myers & Shasky, 1987)

Synonyms
- Chicoreus (Phyllonotus) eversoni (D'Attilio, Myers & Shasky, 1987) (basionym); Chicoreus eversoni (D'Attilio, Myers & Shasky, 1987)

Species of gastropod

Phyllonotus eversoni is a species of sea snail, a marine gastropod mollusc in the family Muricidae, commonly known as murex snails or rock snails. Members of this family are predatory marine gastropods that occur in tropical and temperate oceans worldwide. Species of the genus Phyllonotus are typically characterized by robust shells with pronounced spines, fronds, or sculptured ridges.

The species was first formally described in 1987 by malacologists Anthony D'Attilio, Bruce Myers, and David Shasky.

== Description ==
The size of an adult shell of Phyllonotus eversoni typically ranges between 100 mm and 155 mm in length, making it a relatively large species within the Muricidae family.

Like other members of the genus Phyllonotus, the shell is thick and strongly sculptured. It generally possesses a high spire and a broad body whorl. The exterior surface is ornamented with axial ribs and spiral cords that may develop into spines or frond-like projections, features typical of many murex snails. These projections are thought to help provide protection against predators and may also aid in camouflage among rocky substrates and coral environments.

The aperture is oval to elongated, and the outer lip is often thickened in mature individuals. The shell terminates in a moderately long siphonal canal, a structure characteristic of predatory marine gastropods that allows the animal to extend its siphon while buried or partially concealed in the substrate.

Shell coloration in species of Phyllonotus often varies from pale cream to tan or brown, sometimes with darker banding or mottled patterns. The interior of the aperture may show lighter coloration. As with many muricids, variation in color and sculpture can occur depending on environmental conditions and growth stages.

Muricidae species are known for producing strong shell structures composed primarily of calcium carbonate. These shells provide protection against predation and environmental stress in coastal marine habitats.

== Biology and behavior ==
Like other muricid snails, Phyllonotus eversoni is believed to be carnivorous. Members of the family Muricidae typically prey on other marine invertebrates, including bivalves, barnacles, and other mollusks. They commonly feed by drilling a hole through the shell of their prey using a specialized radula and chemical secretions, allowing them to consume the soft tissues inside.

Muricids are also known for producing a secretion from a specialized gland that historically formed the basis of the famous Tyrian purple dye, though this is primarily associated with species in the genera Murex and Bolinus.

The life cycle of muricid snails generally includes egg capsules deposited on hard substrates such as rocks or coral. After development within the capsule, juvenile snails emerge and begin life as small benthic predators.

== Distribution ==
Phyllonotus eversoni has been recorded from waters surrounding Cocos Island, Costa Rica, located in the eastern Pacific Ocean. Cocos Island is a remote oceanic island approximately 550 km off the Pacific coast of Costa Rica and is known for its rich marine biodiversity.

The species likely inhabits rocky or coral-associated marine environments, which are typical habitats for muricid snails. These environments provide both shelter and access to prey species such as barnacles, small mollusks, and other invertebrates.

Due to the relative isolation of Cocos Island and limited collecting activity in some regions of the eastern Pacific, the full distribution range of P. eversoni may not yet be completely documented.

== Taxonomy ==
Phyllonotus eversoni belongs to the family Muricidae, one of the most diverse families of predatory marine gastropods. The family includes many species known for their elaborate shell ornamentation and ecological role as predators in marine ecosystems.

The genus Phyllonotus includes several species distributed primarily in tropical and subtropical seas. These species are often distinguished by their strongly sculptured shells and pronounced spines or fronds.
