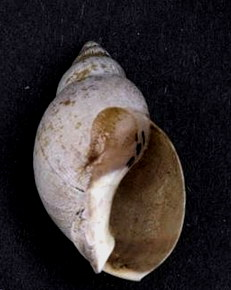
- Apertural view of a shell of Buccinastrum paytense (museum specimen at Naturalis Biodiversity Center)

Scientific classification
- Kingdom: Animalia
- Phylum: Mollusca
- Class: Gastropoda
- Subclass: Caenogastropoda
- Order: Neogastropoda
- Superfamily: Buccinoidea
- Family: Buccinanopsidae
- Genus: Buccinastrum; Pastorino & Simone, 2021

Type species
- Buccinum deforme P. P. King, 1832

= Buccinastrum =

Genus of gastropods

Buccinastrum is a genus of sea snails, marine gastropod mollusks in the family Buccinanopsidae, the Nassa mud snails or dog whelks and the like.

== Species ==
- Buccinastrum deforme (P. P. King, 1832)
- Buccinastrum duartei (Klappenbach, 1961)
- Buccinastrum paytense (Kiener, 1834)
- Buccinastrum uruguayense (Pilsbry, 1897)
