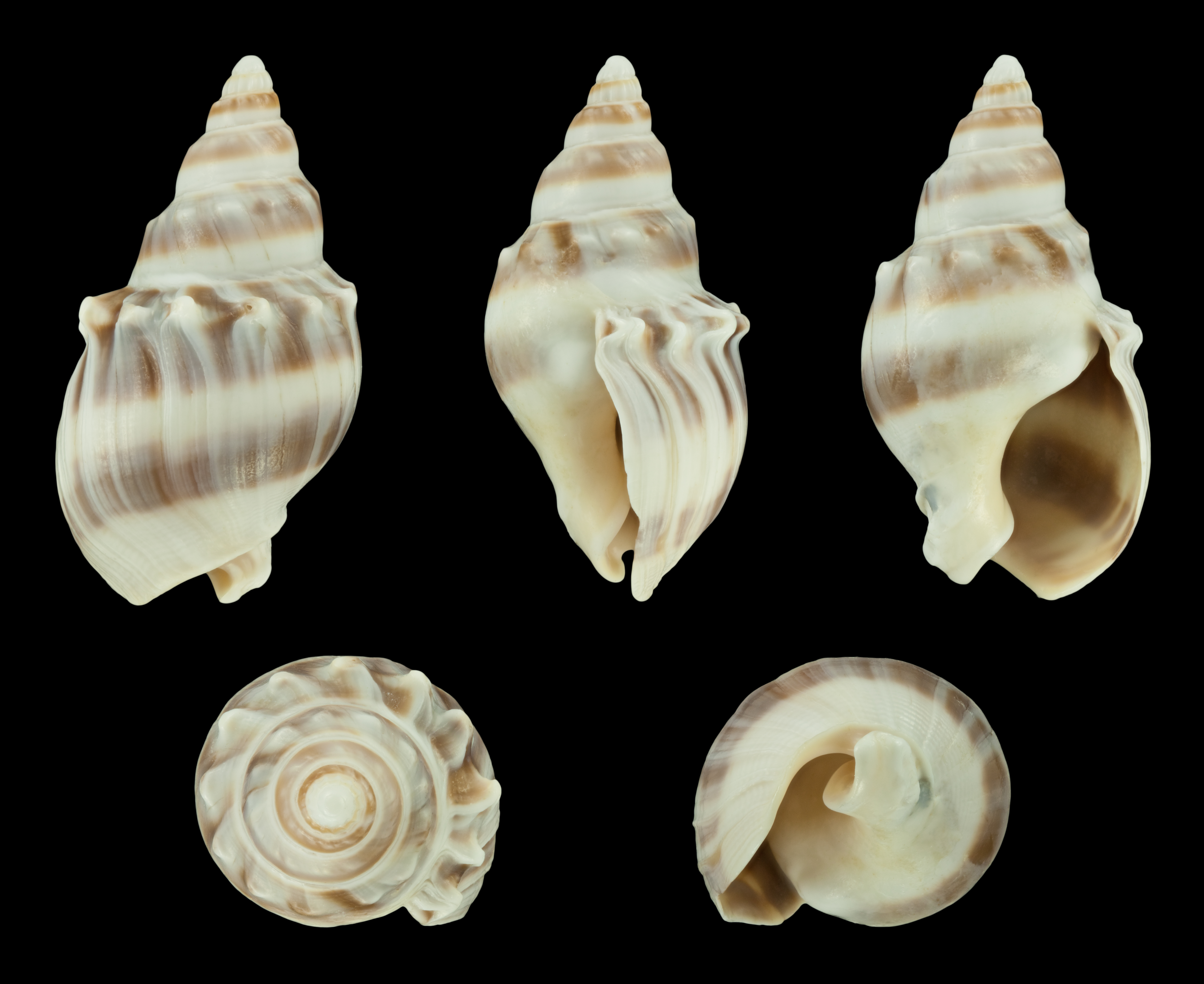
- Five views of a shell of Buccinanops monilifer

Scientific classification
- Kingdom: Animalia
- Phylum: Mollusca
- Class: Gastropoda
- Subclass: Caenogastropoda
- Order: Neogastropoda
- Family: Buccinanopsidae
- Genus: Buccinanops
- Species: B. monilifer

Binomial name
- Buccinanops monilifer (Kiener, 1834)

Synonyms
- Buccinum moniliferum Kiener, 1834 (original combination); Bullia armata Gray, 1839; Dorsanum moniliferum (Kiener, 1834)

= Buccinanops monilifer =

Species of gastropod

Buccinanops monilifer, common name the collared buccinum, is a species of sea snail, a marine gastropod mollusk in the family Nassariidae, the Nassa mud snails or dog whelks.

== Description ==
The size of the shell varies between 28 mm and 51 mm.

The smooth shell is ovate, oblong and fusiform. It is, whitish, slightly diaphanous, surrounded by two brown bands, interrupted by very prominent chestnut-colored spots upon the lowest whorl of the spire. A band of the same color, but less distinct, exists upon the other whorls. The spire is composed of seven or eight slightly angular whorls, the two or three lowest, crowned with a row of elongated, solid, pointed tubercles, pretty near to each other. The tubercles of the upper whorls are less apparent. The ovate aperture is yellowish. The base is pretty strongly emarginated. The thin outer lip is arched, marked internally by two transverse brown bands, which are very apparent externally.

== Distribution ==
This marine species occurs from Central Brazil to Argentina
