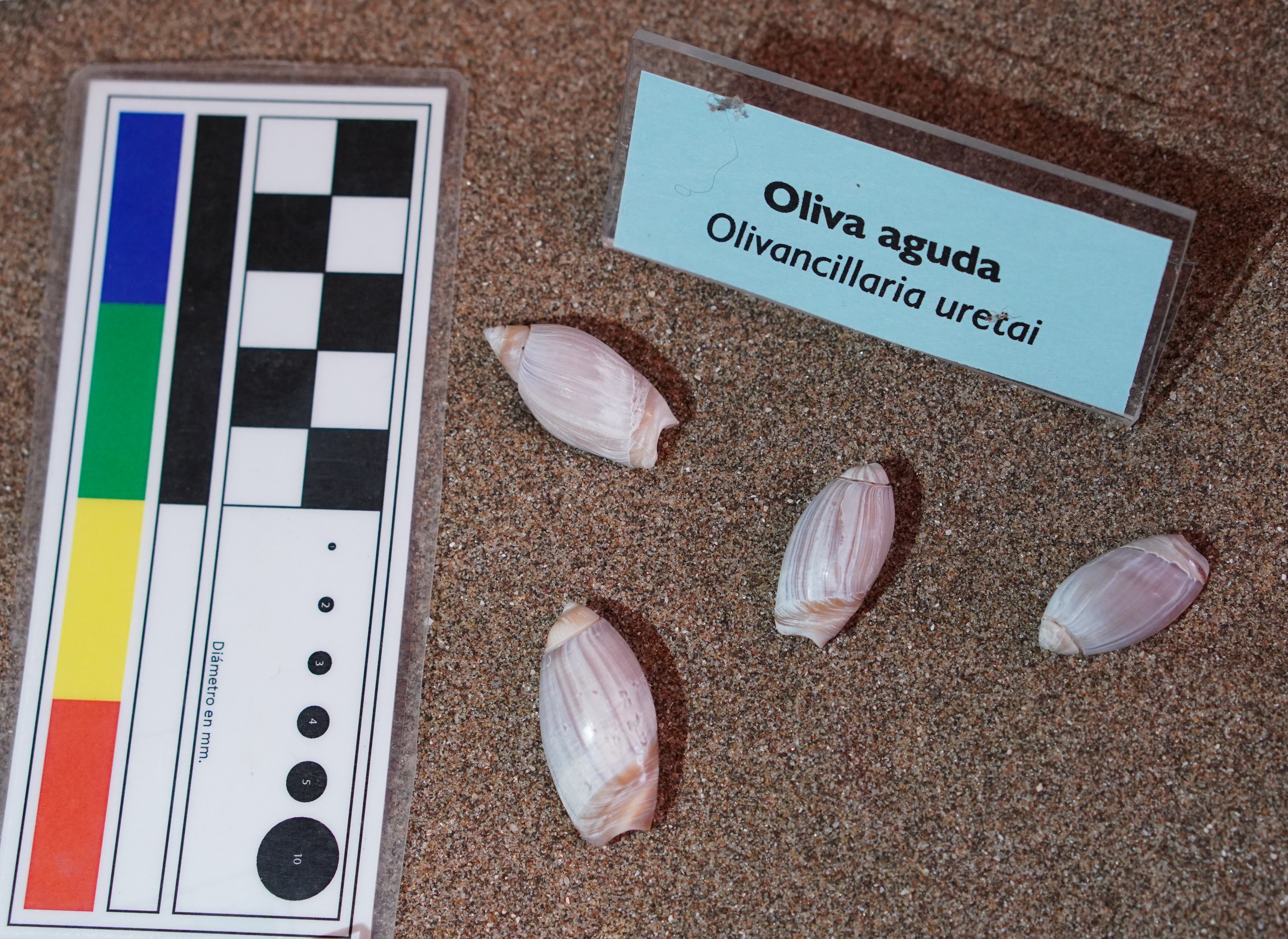

Scientific classification
- Kingdom: Animalia
- Phylum: Mollusca
- Class: Gastropoda
- Subclass: Caenogastropoda
- Order: Neogastropoda
- Family: Olividae
- Genus: Olivancillaria
- Species: O. orbignyi

Binomial name
- Olivancillaria orbignyi (Marrat, 1868)

Synonyms
- Agaronia orbignyi (Marrat, 1868); Agaronia pallida auct. non Swainson, 1831; Agaronia testacea auct. non Lamarck, 1811; Oliva orbignyi Marrat, 1868 (original combination); Olivancillaria uretai Klappenbach, 1965

= Olivancillaria orbignyi =

Species of gastropod

Olivancillaria orbignyi, common name Ureta's olive, is a species of sea snail, a marine gastropod mollusk in the family Olividae, the olives.

== Description ==
The length of the shell varies between 24 mm and 35 mm.

== Distribution ==
This species occurs in the Atlantic Ocean from Brazil to Argentina.
