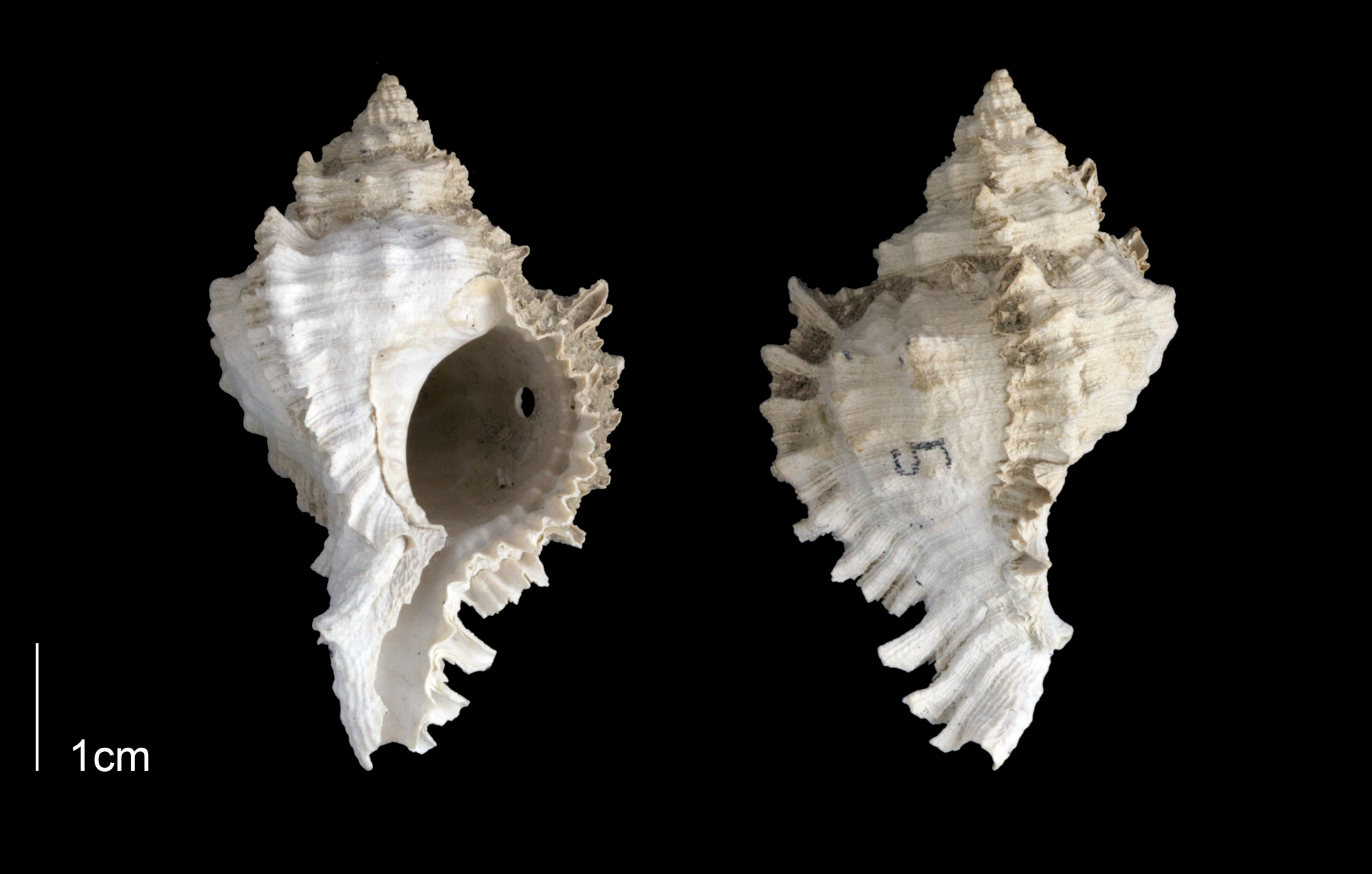

Scientific classification
- Kingdom: Animalia
- Phylum: Mollusca
- Class: Gastropoda
- Subclass: Caenogastropoda
- Order: Neogastropoda
- Family: Muricidae
- Genus: Phyllonotus
- Species: P. globosus

Binomial name
- Phyllonotus globosus Emmons, 1858

Synonyms
- Chicoreus (Phyllonotus) globosus (Emmons, 1858); Chicoreus globosus (Emmons, 1858); Murex globosus Emmons, 1858

= Phyllonotus globosus =

Species of gastropod

Phyllonotus globosus, common name : the globular apple murex, is a species of sea snail, a marine gastropod mollusc in the family Muricidae, the murex snails or rock snails.

== Description ==
The size of an adult shell varies between 70 mm and 110 mm.

Original description by Ebeneezer Emmons (1858):

"Shell rather globose, or obtusely fusiform, and with four principal varices; intermediate ones irregular and spirally, traversed by many angular ridges, body whirl inflated, aperture oval, peristome continuous, and extended posteriorly on the body whirl, forming an angulated canal; outer lip ridged within and crenulated on the margin; collumela lip ridged and one ridge at the posterior angle; beak reflexed."

== Distribution ==
This species is found in the Caribbean Sea off Venezuela.
