= Olivancillaria contortuplicata =

Scientific classification
- Kingdom: Animalia
- Phylum: Mollusca
- Class: Gastropoda
- Subclass: Caenogastropoda
- Order: Neogastropoda
- Family: Olividae
- Genus: Olivancillaria
- Species: O. contortuplicata

Binomial name
- Olivancillaria contortuplicata (Reeve, 1850)

Species of gastropod

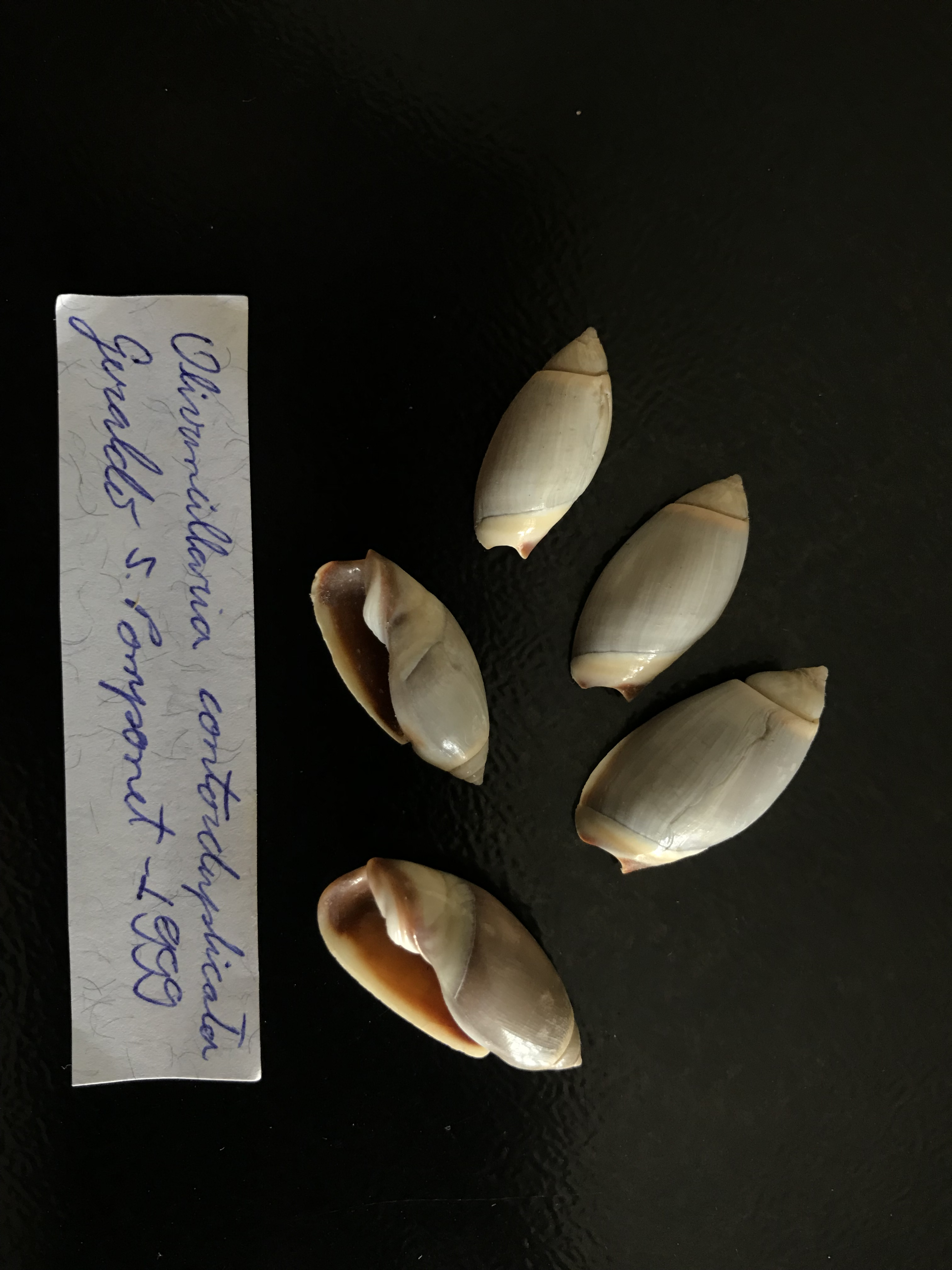
Olivancillaria contorduplicata from Santa Cataria, Brazil. Fabio Wiggers collection

Olivancillaria contortuplicata is a species of sea snail, a marine gastropod mollusk in the family Olividae, the olives.

== Distribution ==
Southern Brazil.
