= Phyllonotus peratus =

Scientific classification
- Kingdom: Animalia
- Phylum: Mollusca
- Class: Gastropoda
- Subclass: Caenogastropoda
- Order: Neogastropoda
- Family: Muricidae
- Genus: Phyllonotus
- Species: P. peratus

Binomial name
- Phyllonotus peratus Keen A.M., 1960

Synonyms
- Chicoreus (Phyllonotus) decorus Keen, 1960; Chicoreus (Phyllonotus) peratus (Keen, 1960); Chicoreus peratus (Keen, 1960); Phyllonotus peratus decorus Keen, 1960

Species of gastropod

Phyllonotus peratus is a species of sea snail, a marine gastropod mollusc in the family Muricidae, the murex snails or rock snails.

== Description ==
The size of an adult shell varies between 45 mm and 66 mm. The coloring is a neutral cream with brown features.

== Distribution ==
This species occurs in the Pacific Ocean between Mexico and Panama.
