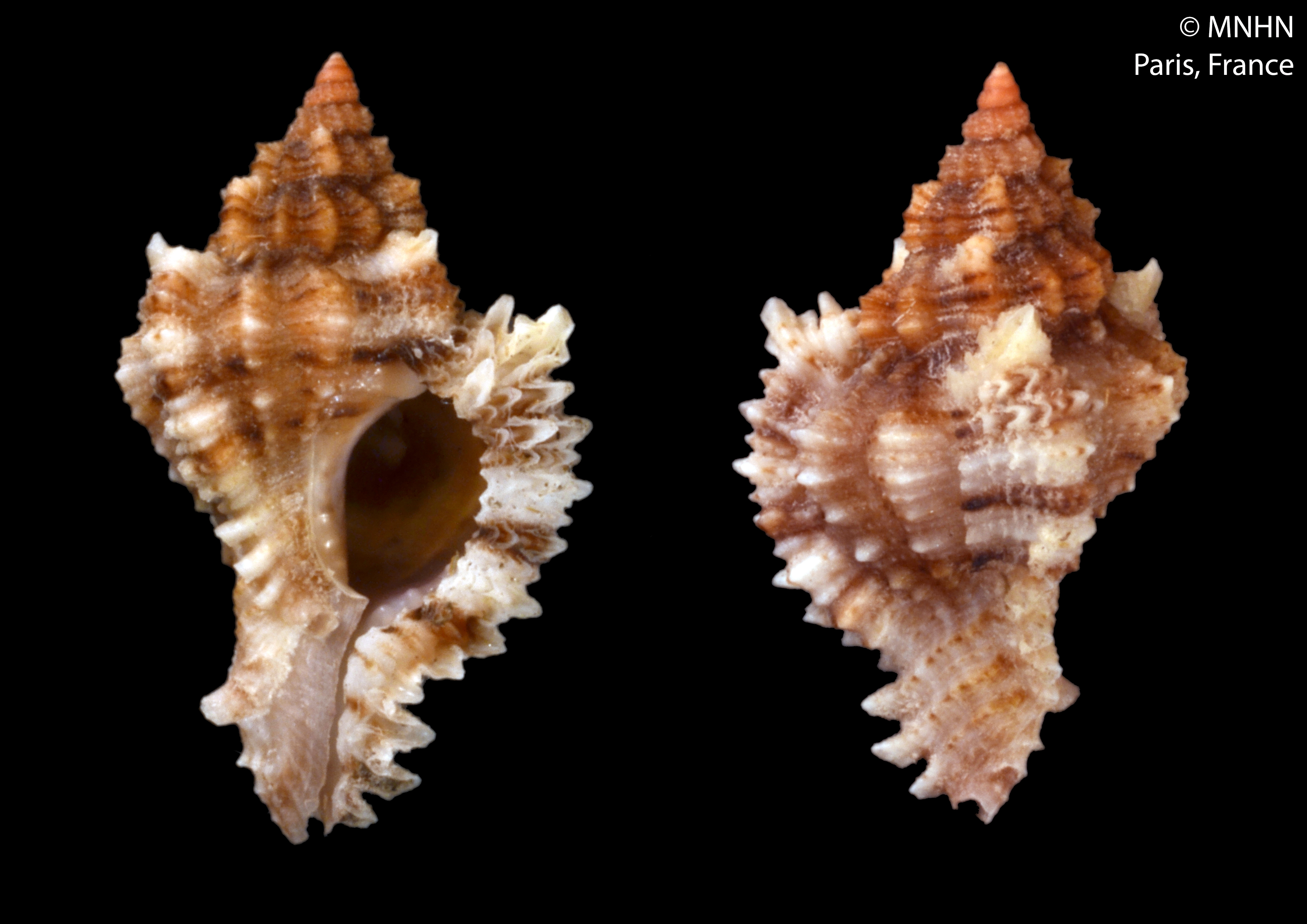
- Shell of Phyllonotus oculatus (specimen at MNHN, Paris)

Scientific classification
- Kingdom: Animalia
- Phylum: Mollusca
- Class: Gastropoda
- Subclass: Caenogastropoda
- Order: Neogastropoda
- Family: Muricidae
- Genus: Phyllonotus
- Species: P. oculatus

Binomial name
- Phyllonotus oculatus (Reeve, 1845)

Synonyms
- Chicoreus (Phyllonotus) oculatus (Reeve, 1845); Chicoreus oculatus (Reeve, 1845); Murex oculatus Reeve, 1845b; Phyllonotus pomum f. oculatus (Reeve, 1845)

= Phyllonotus oculatus =

Species of gastropod

Phyllonotus oculatus, common name the oculate apple murex, is a species of sea snail, a marine gastropod mollusc in the family Muricidae, the murex snails or rock snails.

== Description ==
The adult shell size varies between 50 mm and 124 mm.

== Distribution ==
This species occurs in the Gulf of Mexico, the Caribbean Sea, the Lesser Antilles and in the Atlantic Ocean from Florida to Eastern Brazil.
