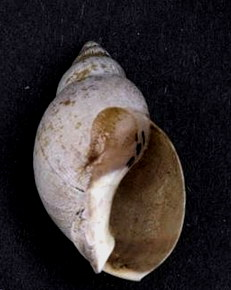
- Apertural view of a shell of Buccinastrum paytense (museum specimen at Naturalis Biodiversity Center)

Scientific classification
- Kingdom: Animalia
- Phylum: Mollusca
- Class: Gastropoda
- Subclass: Caenogastropoda
- Order: Neogastropoda
- Family: Buccinanopsidae
- Genus: Buccinastrum
- Species: B. paytense

Binomial name
- Buccinastrum paytense (Kiener, 1834)

Synonyms
- Buccinanops paytensis (Kiener, 1834) ·; Buccinum citrinum Reeve, 1846; Buccinum paytense Kiener, 1834 (original combination); Buccinum squalidum King, 1832 (invalid: junior homonym of Buccinum squalidum Gmelin, 1791)

= Buccinastrum paytense =

Species of mollusc

Buccinastrum paytense, common name the Payta buccinum, is a species of sea snail, a marine gastropod mollusk in the family Nassariidae, the Nassa mud snails or dog whelks.

== Description ==
The size of the shell attains 55 mm.

The smooth shell is ovate and oblong. Its ground color is whitish, marked with longitudinal reddish lines. The epidermis which covers it, is pretty thick, and of a beautiful chestnut color. The spire is elongated, pointed, composed of seven slightly convex whorls. The whitish aperture is ovate, slightly narrowed towards the upper part, and widened at the base, which is rather deeply emarginated. The thin outer lip is slightly rounded, compressed towards its upper third. The columella shows a white callosity, adhering to the body of the shell, and partially formed by the left lip.

== Distribution ==
This marine species occurs from Argentina to Chile. It also inhabits the rocks of Payta upon the coasts of Peru.
