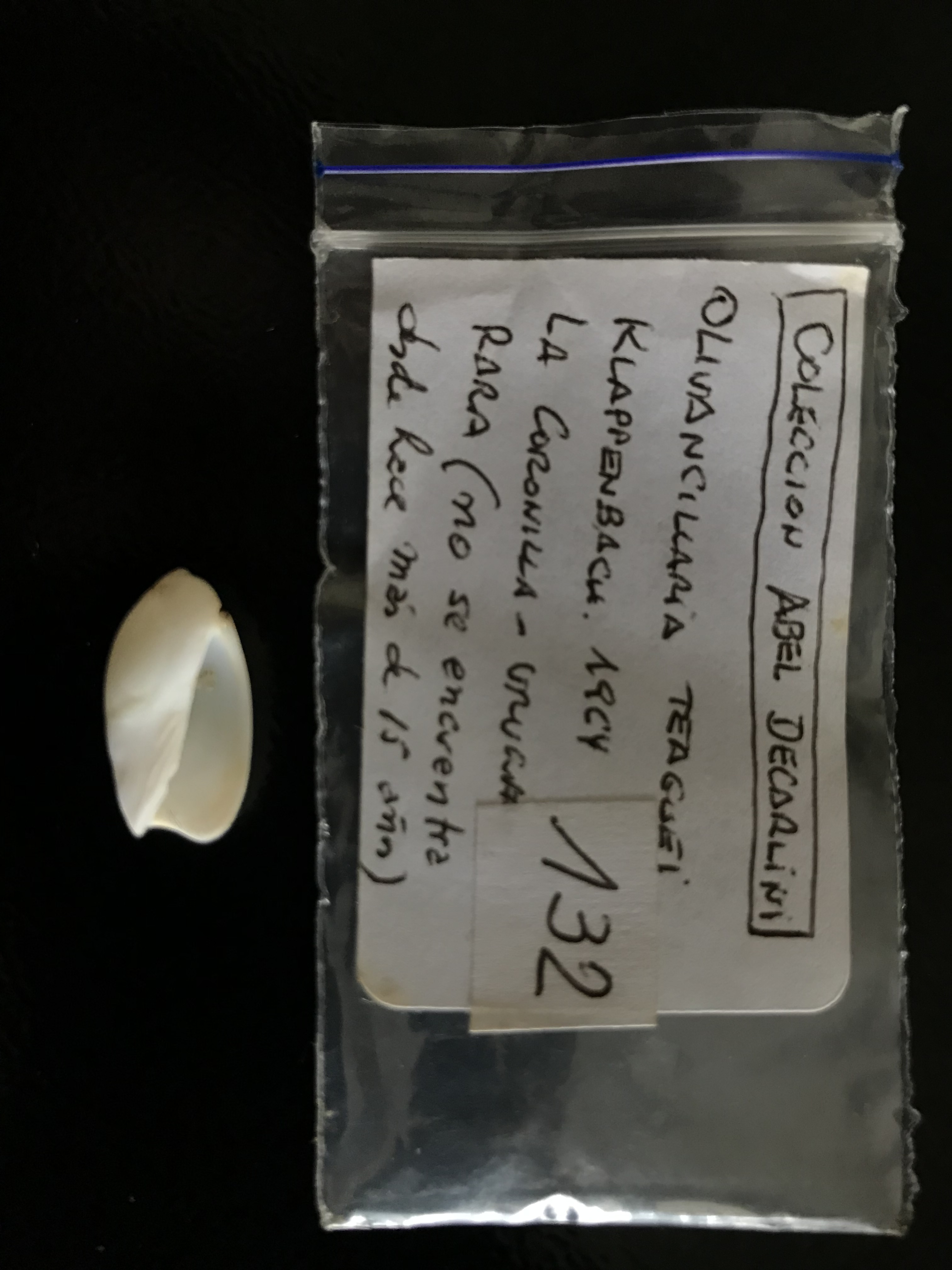

Scientific classification
- Kingdom: Animalia
- Phylum: Mollusca
- Class: Gastropoda
- Subclass: Caenogastropoda
- Order: Neogastropoda
- Family: Olividae
- Genus: Olivancillaria
- Species: O. teaguei

Binomial name
- Olivancillaria teaguei Klappenbach, 1964

= Olivancillaria teaguei =

Species of gastropod

Olivancillaria teaguei is a species of sea snail, a marine gastropod mollusk in the family Olividae, the olives.
