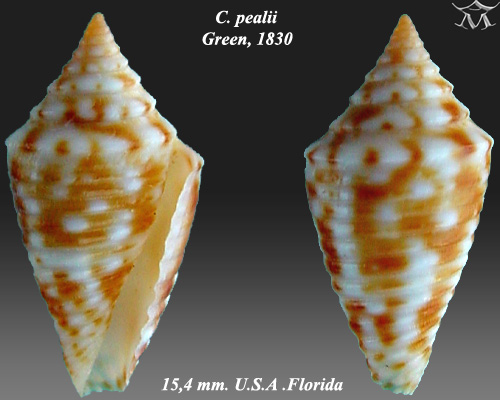
- Apertural and abapertural views of shell of Conasprella jaspidea pealii (Green, 1830)
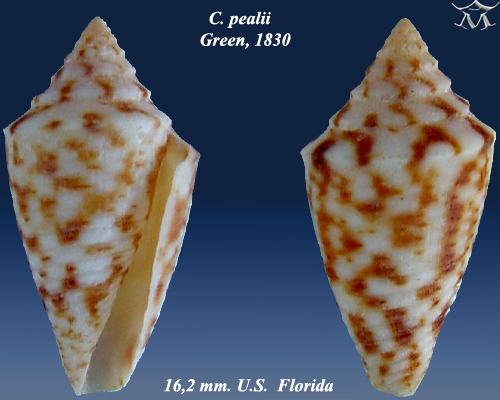

Scientific classification
- Kingdom: Animalia
- Phylum: Mollusca
- Class: Gastropoda
- Subclass: Caenogastropoda
- Order: Neogastropoda
- Family: Conidae
- Genus: Conasprella
- Species: C. jaspidea
- Subspecies: C. j. pealii

Trinomial name
- Conasprella jaspidea pealii (Green, 1830)

Synonyms
- Conus branhamae Clench, 1953; Conus jaspideus branhamae Clench, 1953; Conus jaspideus pealii Green, 1830; Conus nodiferus Kiener, 1847; Conus pealii Green, 1830(original combination, original rank); Conus pseudojaspideus Nowell-Usticke, 1968; Conus sticticus A. Adams, 1855; Conus sulcatus Mühlfeld, 1816 (invalid: junior homonym of Conus sulcatus Hwass, 1792); Conus verrucosus Hwass in Bruguière, 1792; Jaspidiconus branhamae (Clench, 1953); Jaspidiconus jaspideus pealii (Green, 1830) · accepted, alternate representation; Jaspidiconus pealii (Green, 1830); Profundiconus nodiferus Kiener, L.C., 1845

= Conasprella jaspidea pealii =

Species of gastropod

Conasprella jaspidea pealii is a subspecies of sea snail, a marine gastropod mollusc in the family Conidae, the cone snails and their allies.

Like all species within the genus Conasprella, these cone snails are predatory and venomous. They are capable of stinging humans, therefore live ones should be handled carefully or not at all.

== Distribution ==
This marine species occurs in the Caribbean Sea and off the Lesser Antilles.
