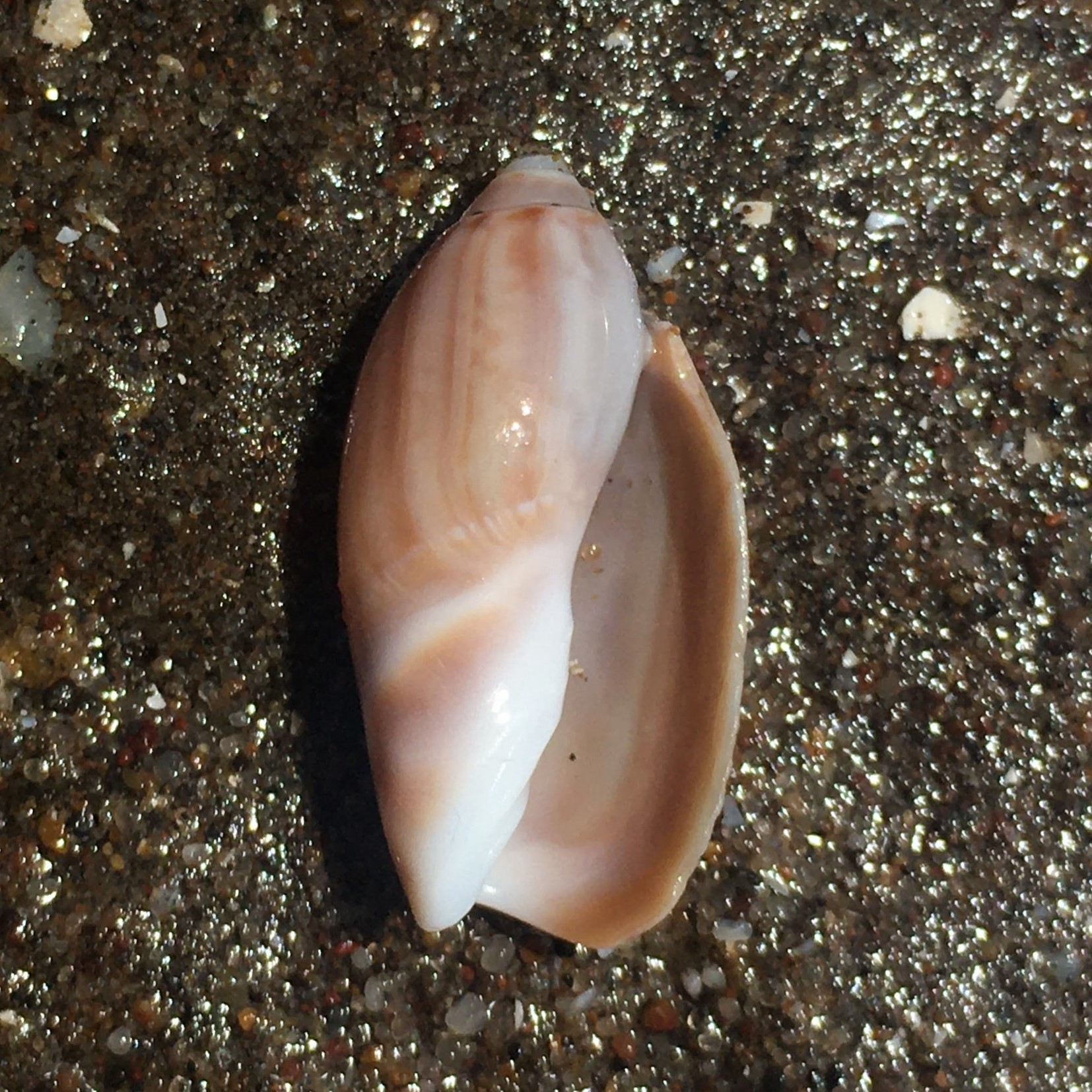

Scientific classification
- Kingdom: Animalia
- Phylum: Mollusca
- Class: Gastropoda
- Subclass: Caenogastropoda
- Order: Neogastropoda
- Family: Olividae
- Genus: Olivancillaria
- Species: O. carcellesi

Binomial name
- Olivancillaria carcellesi Klappenbach, 1965

Synonyms
- Olivancillaria buckuporum Thomé, 1966

= Olivancillaria carcellesi =

Species of gastropod

Olivancillaria carcellesi is a species of sea snail, a marine gastropod mollusk in the family Olividae, the olives.

== Description ==
The length of the shell varies from 25 mm to 55 mm.

== Distribution ==
This species occurs in the Atlantic Ocean from Brazil to Argentina.
