= Pachycymbiola scoresbyana =

Scientific classification
- Kingdom: Animalia
- Phylum: Mollusca
- Class: Gastropoda
- Subclass: Caenogastropoda
- Order: Neogastropoda
- Family: Volutidae
- Genus: Pachycymbiola
- Species: P. scoresbyanum

Binomial name
- Pachycymbiola scoresbyanum (A.W.B. Powell, 1951)

Synonyms
- Adelomelon (Pachycymbiola) scoresbyanum (A. W. B. Powell, 1951); Adelomelon scoresbyanum (A. W. B. Powell, 1951) ·; Miomelon malvina Kaiser, 1977; Miomelon scoresbyanum A. W. B. Powell, 1951(original combination)

Species of gastropod

Pachycymbiola scoresbyanum is a species of sea snail, a marine gastropod mollusk in the family Volutidae, the volutes.
