= Taron (gastropod) =

Scientific classification
- Kingdom: Animalia
- Phylum: Mollusca
- Class: Gastropoda
- Subclass: Caenogastropoda
- Order: Neogastropoda
- Family: Fasciolariidae
- Genus: Taron; Hutton, 1883

Type species
- Trophon dubius Hutton, 1878

Genus of gastropods

Taron is a genus of sea snails, marine gastropod mollusks in the family Fasciolariidae, the spindle snails, the tulip snails and their allies.

== Species ==
Species within the genus Taron include:

- Taron albocostus Ponder, 1968
- Taron dubius (Hutton, 1878)
- Taron mouatae Powell, 1940
