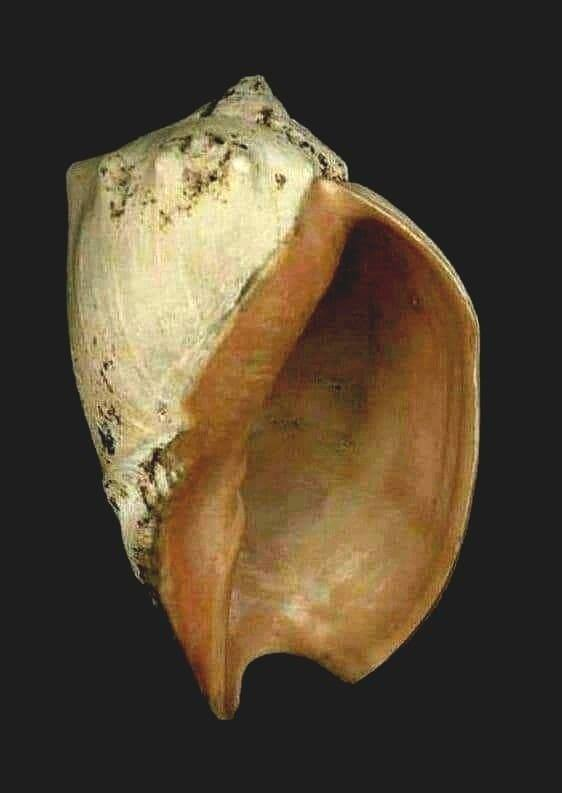
- Shell of Adelomelon brasiliana

Scientific classification
- Kingdom: Animalia
- Phylum: Mollusca
- Class: Gastropoda
- Subclass: Caenogastropoda
- Order: Neogastropoda
- Family: Volutidae
- Subfamily: Cymbiinae
- Genus: Pachycymbiola; Ihering, 1907

Type species
- Voluta brasiliana Lamarck, 1811

Synonyms
- Adelomelon (Pachycymbiola) Ihering, 1907; Cymbiola (Pachycymbiola) Ihering, 1907 (original rank)

= Pachycymbiola =

Genus of gastropods

Pachycymbiola is a genus of sea snails, marine gastropod mollusks in the subfamily Cymbiinae of the family Volutidae.

== Species ==
- † Pachycymbiola ameghinoi (Ihering, 1896)
- † Pachycymbiola arriolensis del Río & Martínez, 2006
- Pachycymbiola brasiliana (Lamarck, 1811)
- † Pachycymbiola camachoi del Río & Martínez, 2006
- †Pachycymbiola chenquensis del Río & Martínez, 2006
- † Pachycymbiola feruglioi (Doello-Jurado, 1931)
- Pachycymbiola ferussacii (Donovan, 1824)
- † Pachycymbiola galvarinoi S. N. Nielsen & Frassinetti, 2007
- Pachycymbiola scoresbyana (A. W. B. Powell, 1951)
- † Pachycymbiola vidali (R. A. Philippi, 1897)
