= Olivella millepunctata =

Scientific classification
- Kingdom: Animalia
- Phylum: Mollusca
- Class: Gastropoda
- Subclass: Caenogastropoda
- Order: Neogastropoda
- Family: Olividae
- Genus: Olivella
- Species: O. millepunctata

Binomial name
- Olivella millepunctata (Duclos, 1840)

Synonyms
- Olivancillaria millepunctata Duclos, 1840

Species of gastropod

Olivella millepunctata is a species of small sea snail, marine gastropod mollusk in the subfamily Olivellinae, in the family Olividae, the olives. Species in the genus Olivella are commonly called dwarf olives.

== Description ==
The length of the shell varies between 9 mm and 16 mm.

== Distribution ==
This species occurs in the Atlantic Ocean off West Africa, off Gabon, and Angola.
