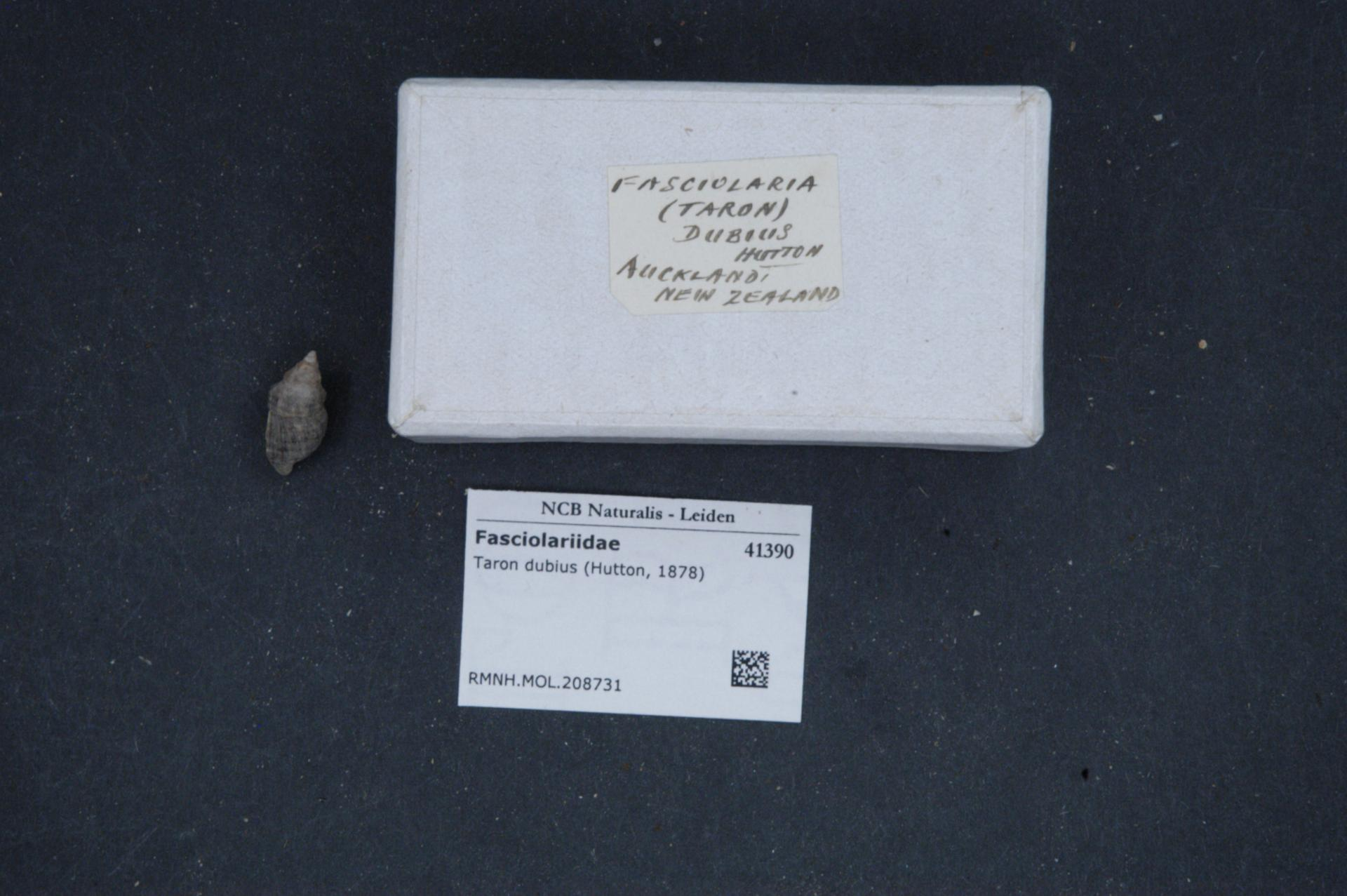

Scientific classification
- Kingdom: Animalia
- Phylum: Mollusca
- Class: Gastropoda
- Subclass: Caenogastropoda
- Order: Neogastropoda
- Family: Fasciolariidae
- Genus: Taron
- Species: T. dubius

Binomial name
- Taron dubius (Hutton, 1878)

Synonyms
- Trophon dubius Hutton, 1878; Latirus huttoni Suter, 1908

= Taron dubius =

Species of gastropod

Taron dubius is a species of sea snail, a marine gastropod mollusk in the family Muricidae, the murex snails or rock snails.
