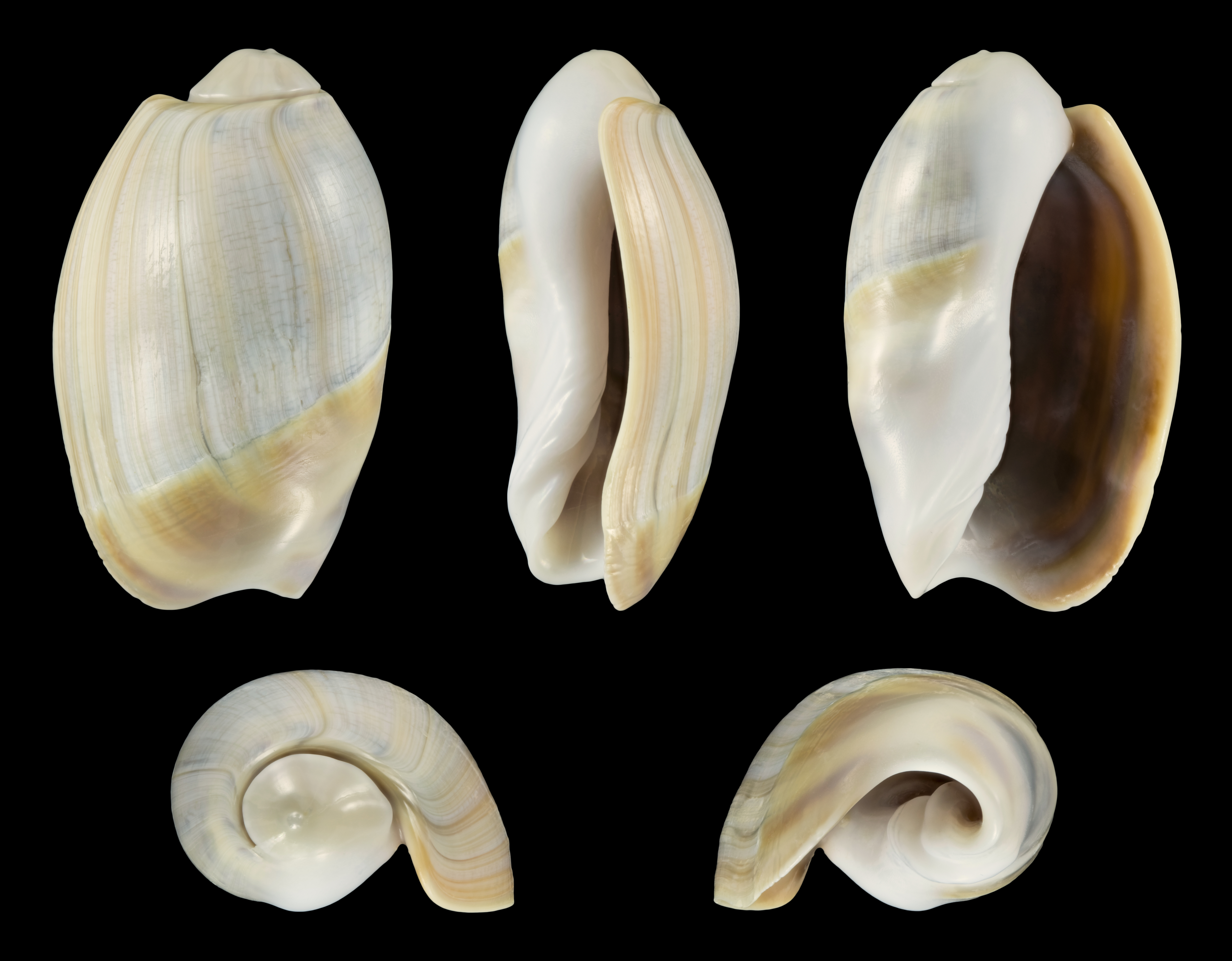
- A shell of Olivancillaria vesica

Scientific classification
- Kingdom: Animalia
- Phylum: Mollusca
- Class: Gastropoda
- Subclass: Caenogastropoda
- Order: Neogastropoda
- Family: Olividae
- Genus: Olivancillaria
- Species: O. vesica

Binomial name
- Olivancillaria vesica (Gmelin, 1791)

= Olivancillaria vesica =

Species of gastropod

Olivancillaria vesica is a species of sea snail, a marine gastropod mollusk in the family Olividae, the olives.

== Distribution ==
O. vesica can be found in the waters off Brazil, Uruguay and Argentina.
