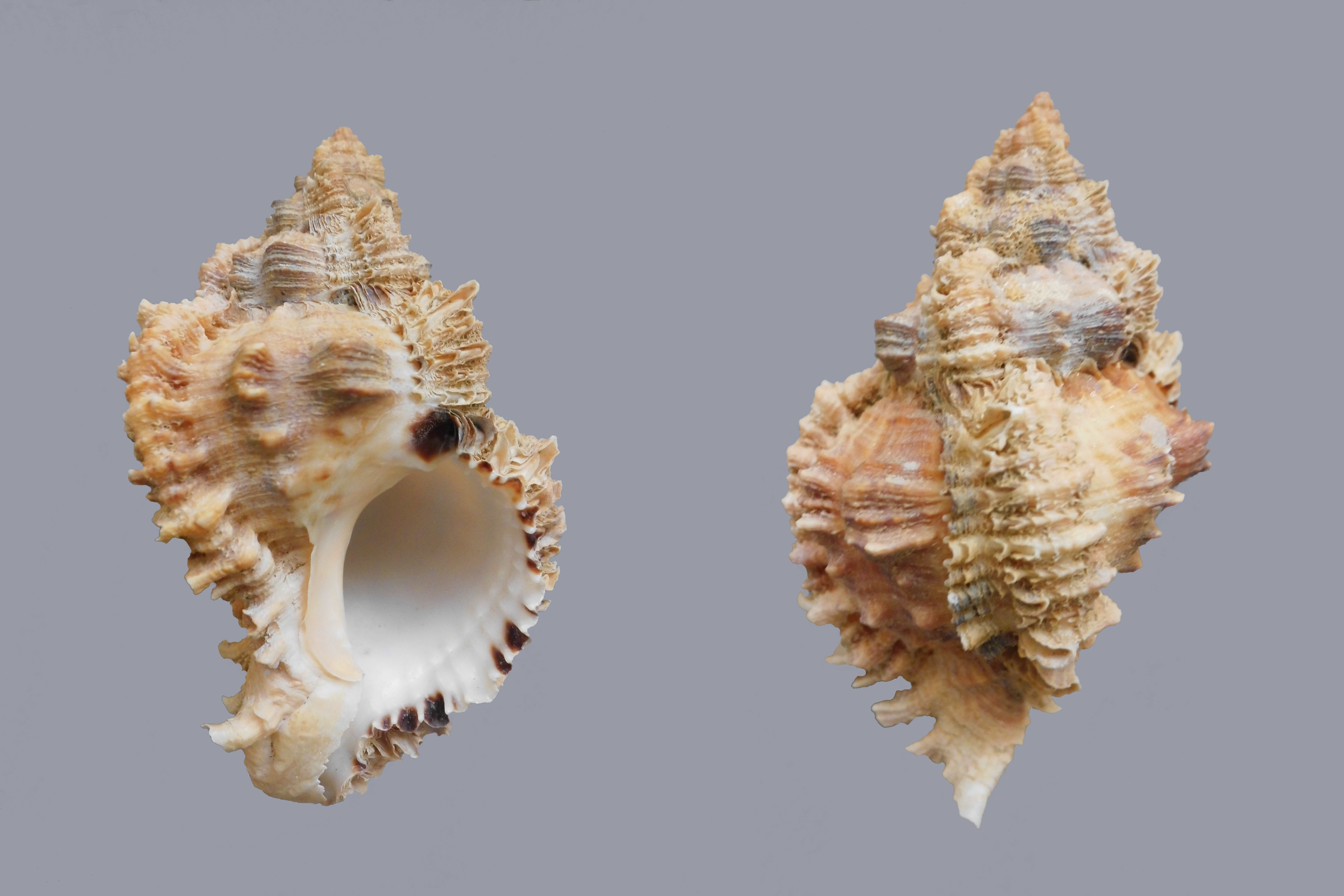
- Shell of Phyllonotus margaritensis

Scientific classification
- Kingdom: Animalia
- Phylum: Mollusca
- Class: Gastropoda
- Subclass: Caenogastropoda
- Order: Neogastropoda
- Family: Muricidae
- Genus: Phyllonotus
- Species: P. margaritensis

Binomial name
- Phyllonotus margaritensis (Abbott, 1958)

Synonyms
- Chicoreus (Phyllonotus) margaritensis (Abbott, 1958); Chicoreus margaritensis (Abbott, 1958); Murex imperialis Swainson, 1831 (Invalid: junior homonym of Murex imperialis Fischer, 1807; Murex margaritensis is a replacement name); Murex margaritensis Abbott, 1958

= Phyllonotus margaritensis =

Species of gastropod

Phyllonotus margaritensis, common name the Margarita Murex, is a species of sea snail, a marine gastropod mollusc in the family Muricidae, the murex snails or rock snails.

== Description ==
Shell presents large and strong reaching sizes between 7–11 cm, with 4 or 5 lap varices, varices these are simple, nodular and obtuse, siphonal canal wide and curved. The mouth has colors that can vary from yellow, orange and red and the inner lip is nodulated at the base.

=== Sexual dimorphism ===
Studies in relation to the size of males and females suggests that females tend to have Phyllonotus margaritensis size larger than males and greater variation in shape.

== Distribution ==
North Carolina to Florida and Caribbean Sea to Brazil. In the Southern Caribbean is noted in: Colombia, Venezuela and Trinidad.

== Habitat ==
This sea snail is often found in abundance in seagrass beds, but also can be observed on rocky areas and reef areas at lower densities. It has been collected in a bathymetric range from 0 to 200 m. This muricid is an active predator of bivalves such as sand-dwelling clams.

== Gallery ==
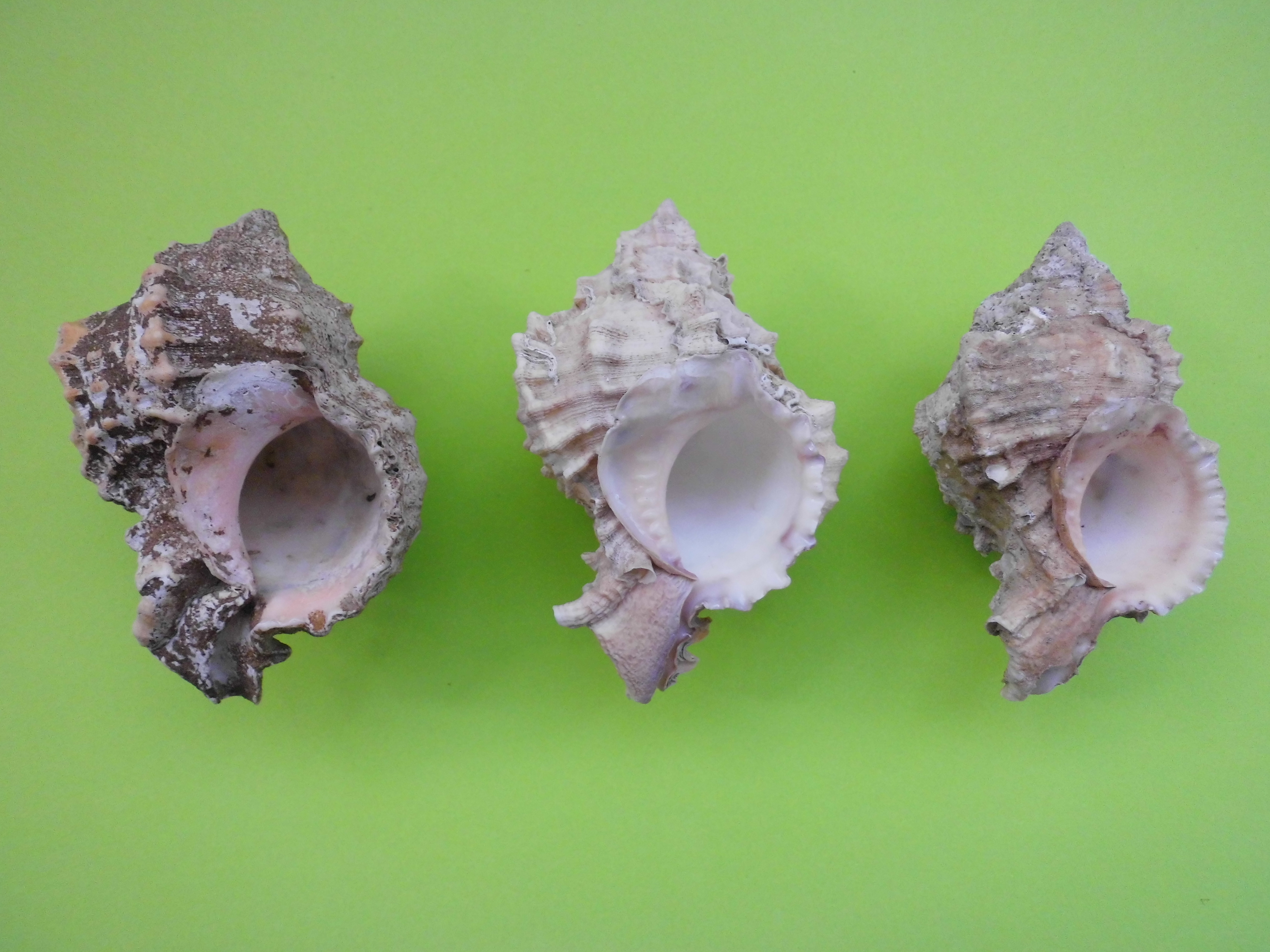

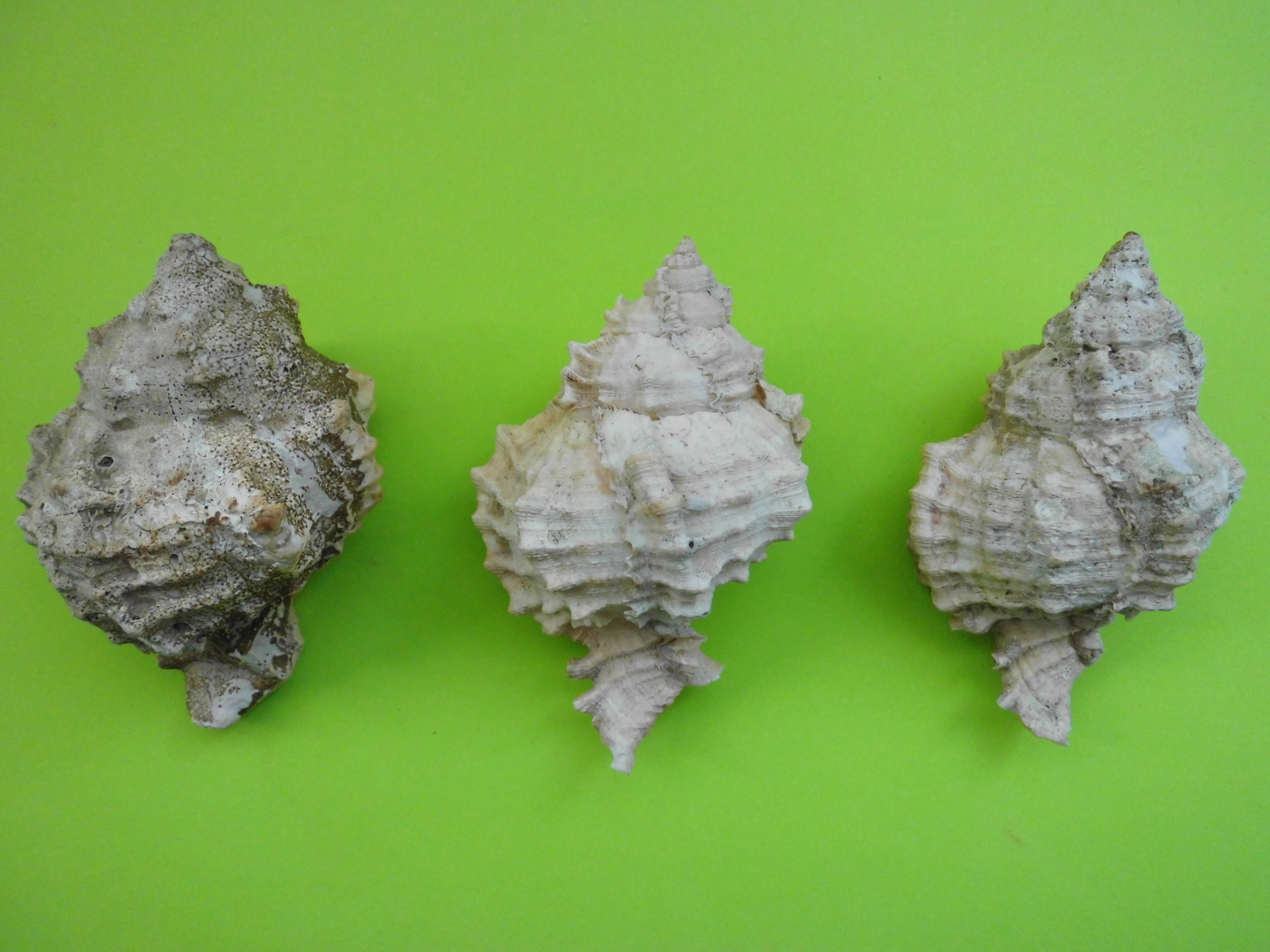

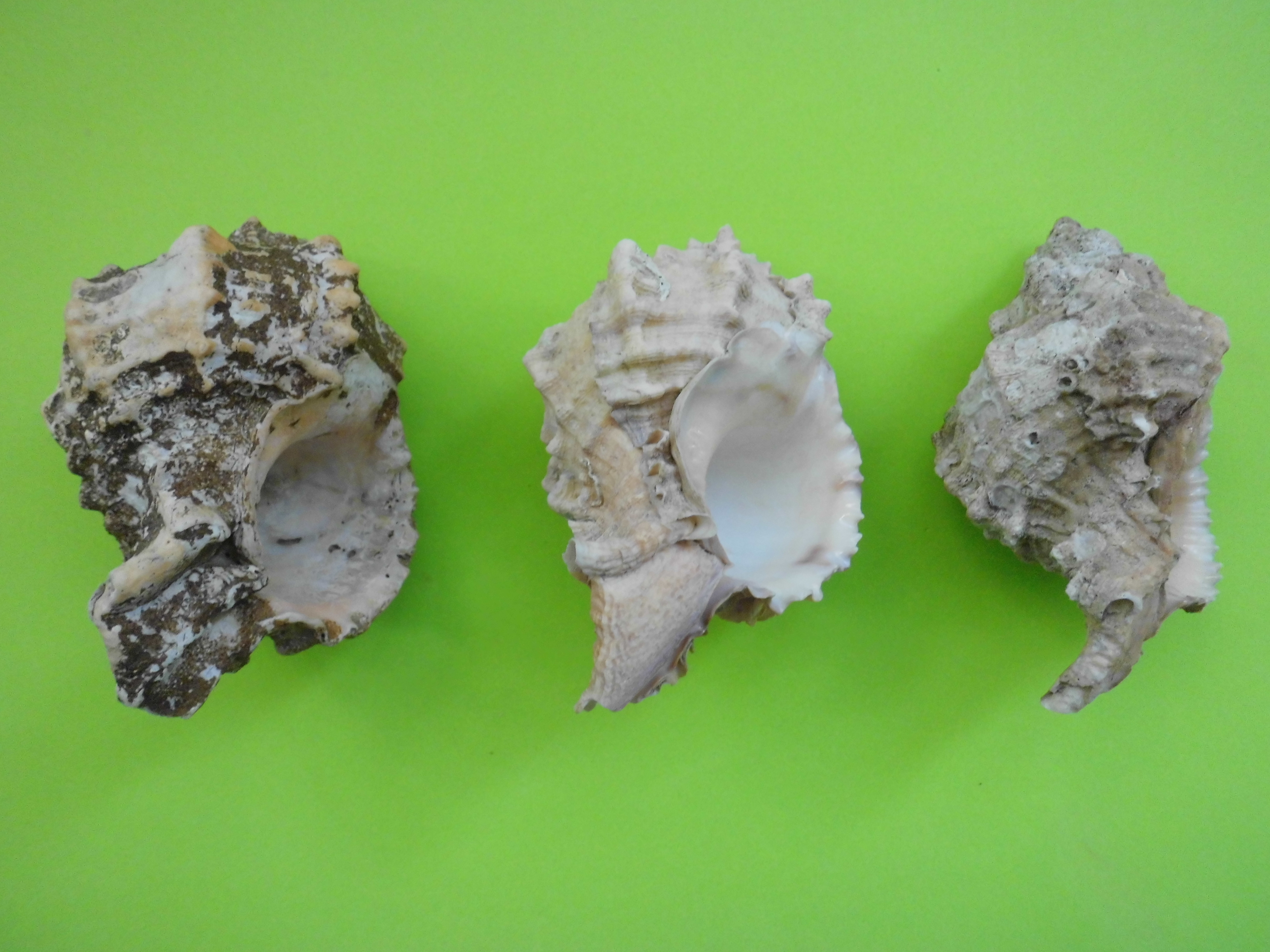

== Reading ==
- Merle D., Garrigues B. & Pointier J.-P. (2011) Fossil and Recent Muricidae of the world. Part Muricinae. Hackenheim: Conchbooks. 648 pp. page(s): 116
