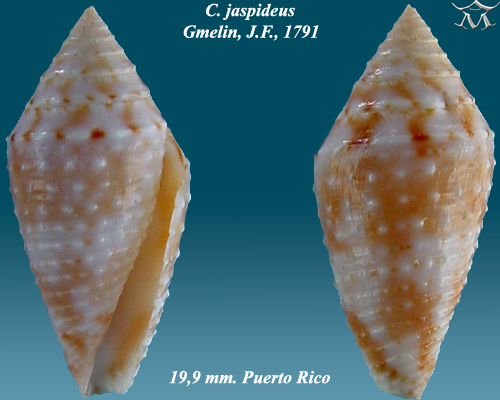
- Apertural and abapertural views of shell of Conasprella jaspidea (Gmelin, J.F., 1791)
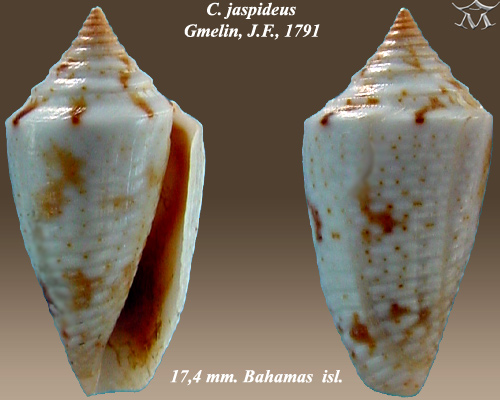

Conservation status
- Least Concern (IUCN 3.1)

Scientific classification
- Kingdom: Animalia
- Phylum: Mollusca
- Class: Gastropoda
- Subclass: Caenogastropoda
- Order: Neogastropoda
- Superfamily: Conoidea
- Family: Conidae
- Genus: Conasprella
- Species: C. jaspidea

Binomial name
- Conasprella jaspidea (Gmelin, 1791)

Synonyms
- See list

= Conasprella jaspidea =

Species of gastropod

Conasprella jaspidea, common name the Jasper cone, is a species of small sea snail, a small cone snail, a marine gastropod mollusk in the family Conidae, the cone snails and their allies.

Like all species within the genus Conasprella, these cone snails are predatory and venomous. They are capable of stinging humans, therefore live ones should be handled carefully or not at all.

== Subspecies ==
- Conasprella jaspidea jaspidea (Gmelin, 1791)
- Conasprella jaspidea pealii Green, 1830

== Synonyms ==
- Conasprella (Ximeniconus) jaspidea (Gmelin, 1791) accepted, alternate representation
- Conus acutimarginatus G. B. Sowerby II, 1866
- Conus corrugatus G. B. Sowerby II, 1870
- Conus crebrisulcatus G. B. Sowerby II, 1857
- Conus exumaensis (Petuch, 2013)
- Conus jaspideus f. acutimarginatus G. B. Sowerby II, 1866 (unavailable name: infrasubspecific rank)
- Conus jaspideus jaspideus Gmelin, 1791
- Conus oleiniki (Petuch, 2013)
- Conus sulcatus Mühlfeld, 1816
- Jaspidiconus acutimarginatus (G. B. Sowerby II, 1866)
- Jaspidiconus exumaensis Petuch, 2013
- Jaspidiconus jaspideus (Gmelin, 1791)
- Jaspidiconus jaspideus f. acutimarginatus (G. B. Sowerby II, 1866)
- Jaspidiconus jaspideus jaspideus (Gmelin, 1791)
- Jaspidiconus oleiniki Petuch, 2013

== Distribution ==
This marine species occurs in the Gulf of Mexico and in the Caribbean Sea (off Guadeloupe); in the Atlantic Ocean off Northern Brazil.

== Description ==
The maximum recorded shell length is 30 mm.

== Habitat ==
The minimum recorded depth for this species is 0 m; maximum recorded depth is 97 m.
