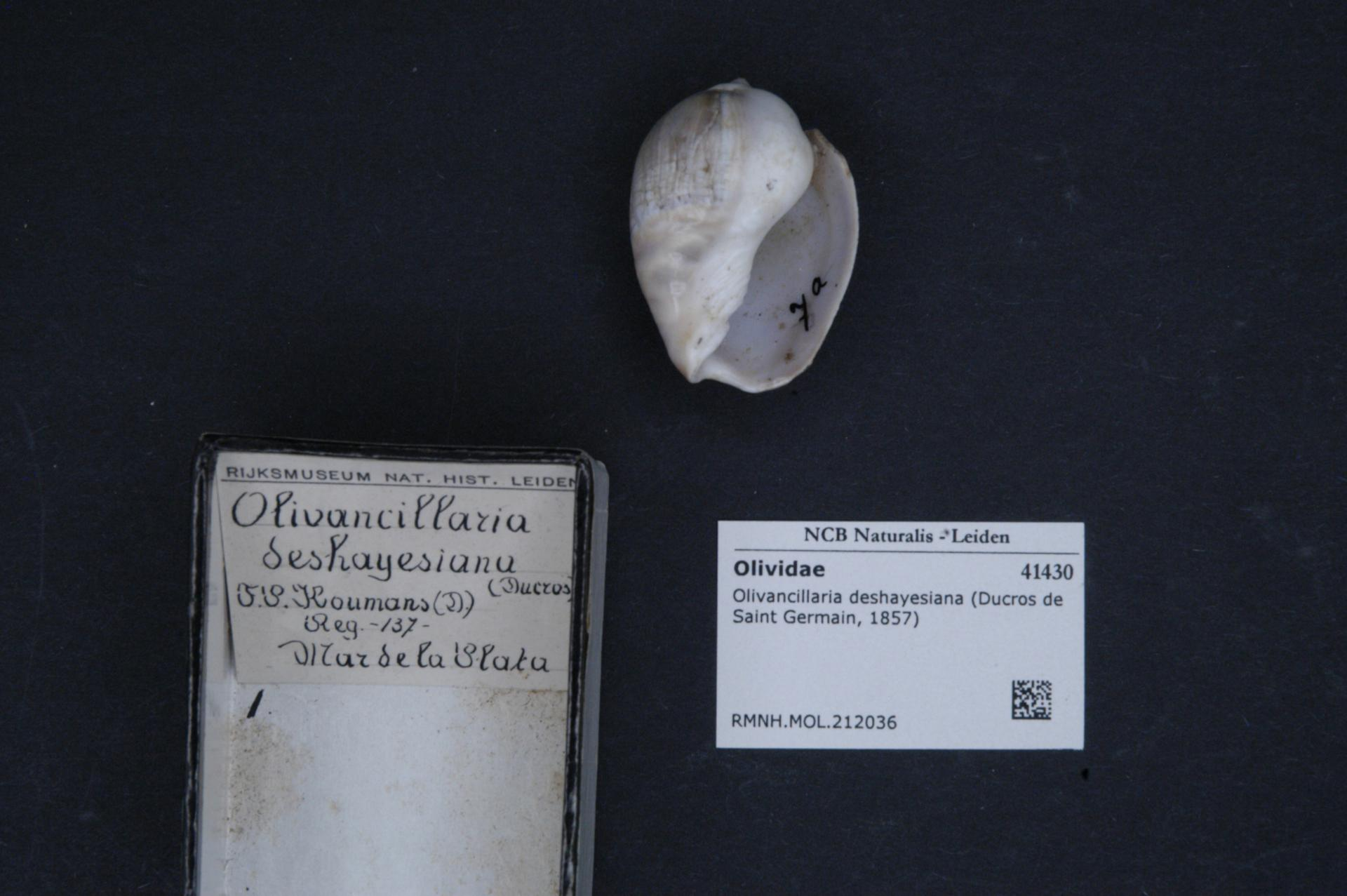

Scientific classification
- Kingdom: Animalia
- Phylum: Mollusca
- Class: Gastropoda
- Subclass: Caenogastropoda
- Order: Neogastropoda
- Family: Olividae
- Genus: Olivancillaria
- Species: O. deshayesiana

Binomial name
- Olivancillaria deshayesiana (Ducros de Saint Germain, 1857)

Synonyms
- Oliva deshayesiana Ducros de Saint Germain, 1857 (original combination); Oliva ovata Marrat, 1871

= Olivancillaria deshayesiana =

Species of gastropod

Olivancillaria deshayesiana is a species of sea snail, a marine gastropod mollusk in the family Olividae, the olives.

== Distribution ==
This species occurs in the Atlantic Ocean from Uruguay to Brazil from Ilha Grande (Rio de Janeiro, Brazil) to Necochea (Buenos Aires, Argentina). It has a spawning period from September to January.
