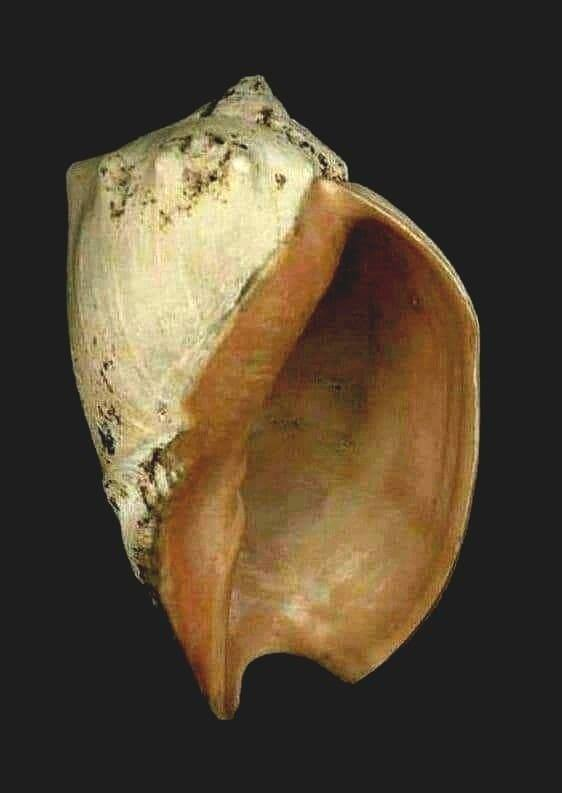
- Preserved shell

Scientific classification
- Kingdom: Animalia
- Phylum: Mollusca
- Class: Gastropoda
- Subclass: Caenogastropoda
- Order: Neogastropoda
- Family: Volutidae
- Genus: Pachycymbiola
- Species: P. brasiliana

Binomial name
- Pachycymbiola brasiliana (Lamarck, 1811)

Synonyms
- Voluta colocynthis Dillwyn, 1817; Voluta brasiliana Lamarck, 1811; Adelomelon brasilianum (Lamarck, 1811); Adelomelon (Pachycymbiola) brasilianum (Lamarck, 1811)

= Pachycymbiola brasiliana =

Species of gastropod

Pachycymbiola brasiliana is a species of sea snail, a marine gastropod mollusk in the family Volutidae, the volutes.

== Description ==
Pachycymbiola brasiliana produces hundreds of translucent orbs. They are firm to the touch but filled with a thick gelatinous liquid. The eggs might look alien to the eye. Pachycymbiola brasiliana is located from southern Brazil, through Uruguay to northern Argentina.

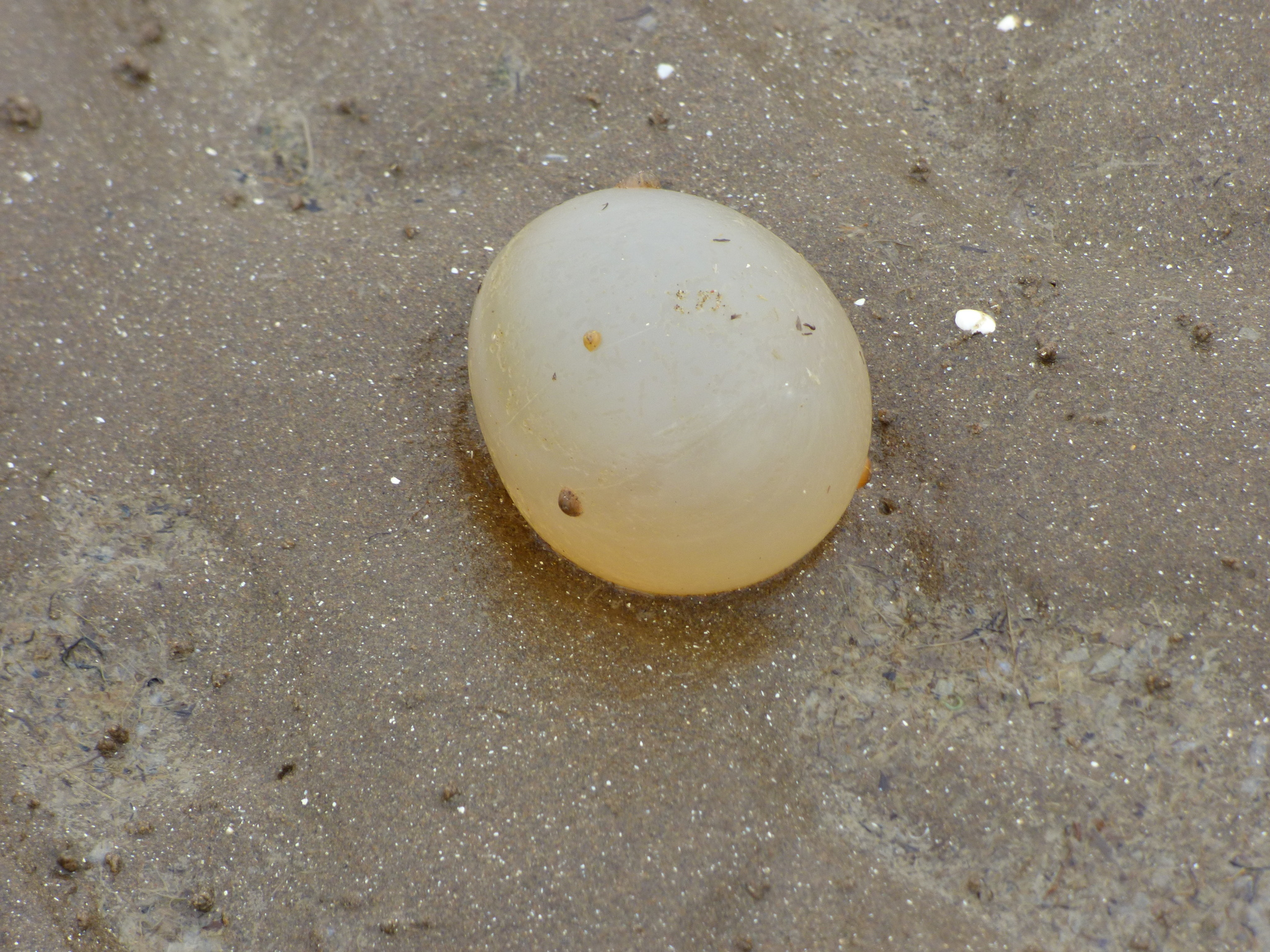
Egg capsule
