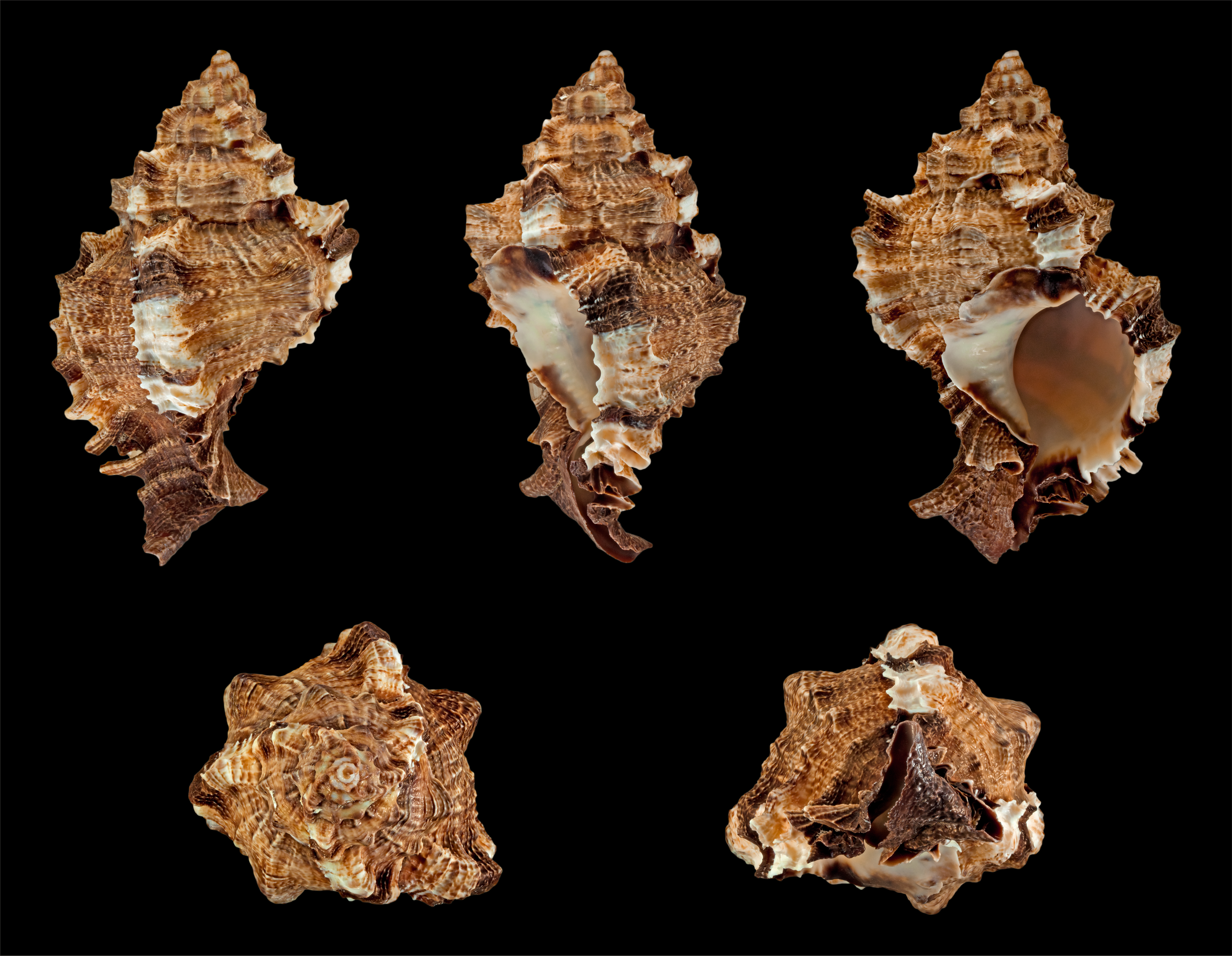
- Phyllonotus pomum (Gmelin, 1791)

Scientific classification
- Kingdom: Animalia
- Phylum: Mollusca
- Class: Gastropoda
- Subclass: Caenogastropoda
- Order: Neogastropoda
- Family: Muricidae
- Genus: Phyllonotus
- Species: P. pomum

Binomial name
- Phyllonotus pomum (Gmelin, 1791)

Synonyms
- Chicoreus (Phyllonotus) pomum (Gmelin, 1791); Chicoreus pomum (Gmelin, 1791); Murex asperrimus Lamarck, 1822; Murex pomiformis Mørch, 1852; Murex pomiformis sensu Martin Locard, 1897; Murex pomum Gmelin, 1791 (basionym)

= Phyllonotus pomum =

Species of gastropod

Phyllonotus pomum, the apple murex, is a species of large sea snail, a marine gastropod mollusc in the family Muricidae, the murex snails or rock snails.

== Description ==
The adult shell's dimensions range from 44 mm to 133 mm.

Original description of Lovell Augustus Reeve (published 1843):

The shell is fusiformly oblong, thick, solid, very rough throughout, transversely conspicuously ridged, tuberculated between the varices; three-varicose, varices tuberculated with a complicated mass of laminae; fulvous or reddish brown, columella and interior of the aperture ochraceous yellow, columellar lip slightly wrinkled, edge erected, vividly stained, especially at the upper part, with very black brown; outer lip strongly toothed, ornamented with three black-brown spots; canal rather short, compressed, recurved."

== Distribution ==
This species occurs in the Caribbean Sea, the Gulf of Mexico and the Lesser Antilles; in the Atlantic Ocean between North Carolina and Northern Brazil.
