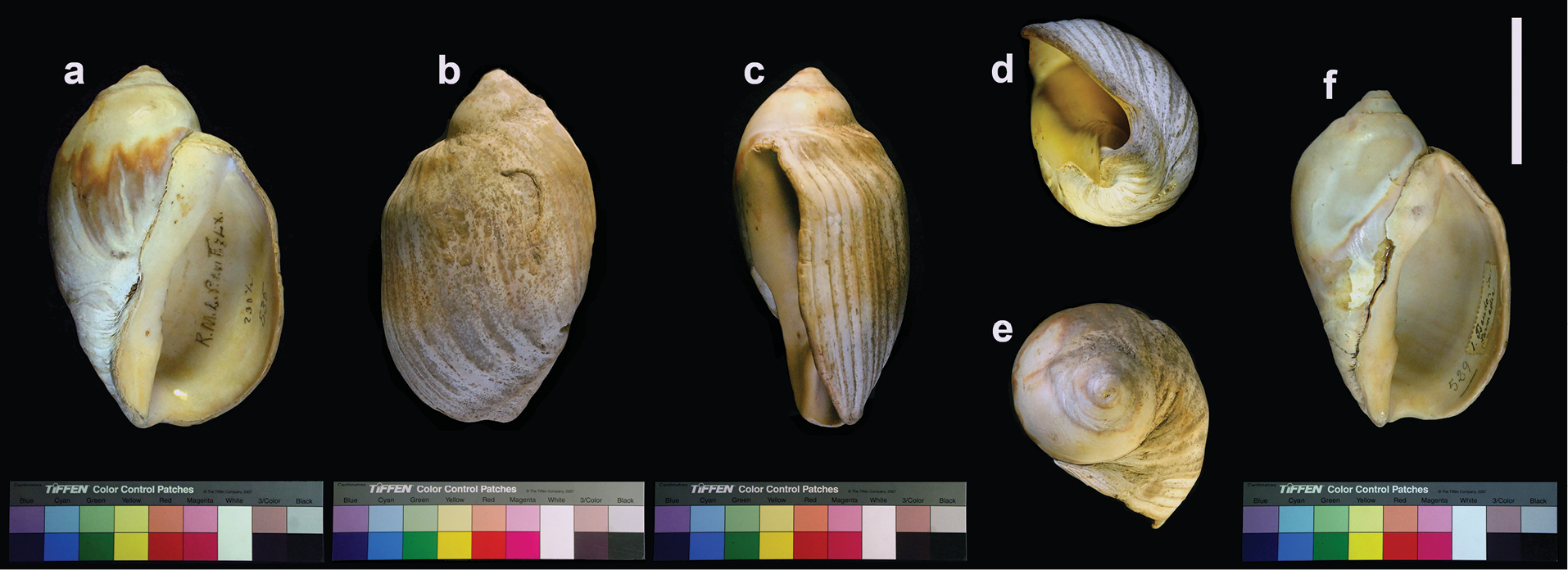
- Shell of Pachycymbiola ferussacii

Scientific classification
- Kingdom: Animalia
- Phylum: Mollusca
- Class: Gastropoda
- Subclass: Caenogastropoda
- Order: Neogastropoda
- Family: Volutidae
- Genus: Pachycymbiola
- Species: P. ferussacii

Binomial name
- Pachycymbiola ferussacii (Donovan, 1824)

Synonyms
- Adelomelon (Pachycymbiola) ferussacii (Donovan, 1824); Adelomelon ferussacii (Donovan, 1824); Voluta ferussacii Donovan, 1824 (original combination); Voluta oviformis Lahille, 1895; Voluta rudis Griffith & Pidgeon, 1834

= Pachycymbiola ferussacii =

Species of gastropod

Pachycymbiola ferussacii is a species of sea snail, a marine gastropod mollusk in the family Volutidae, the volutes.
