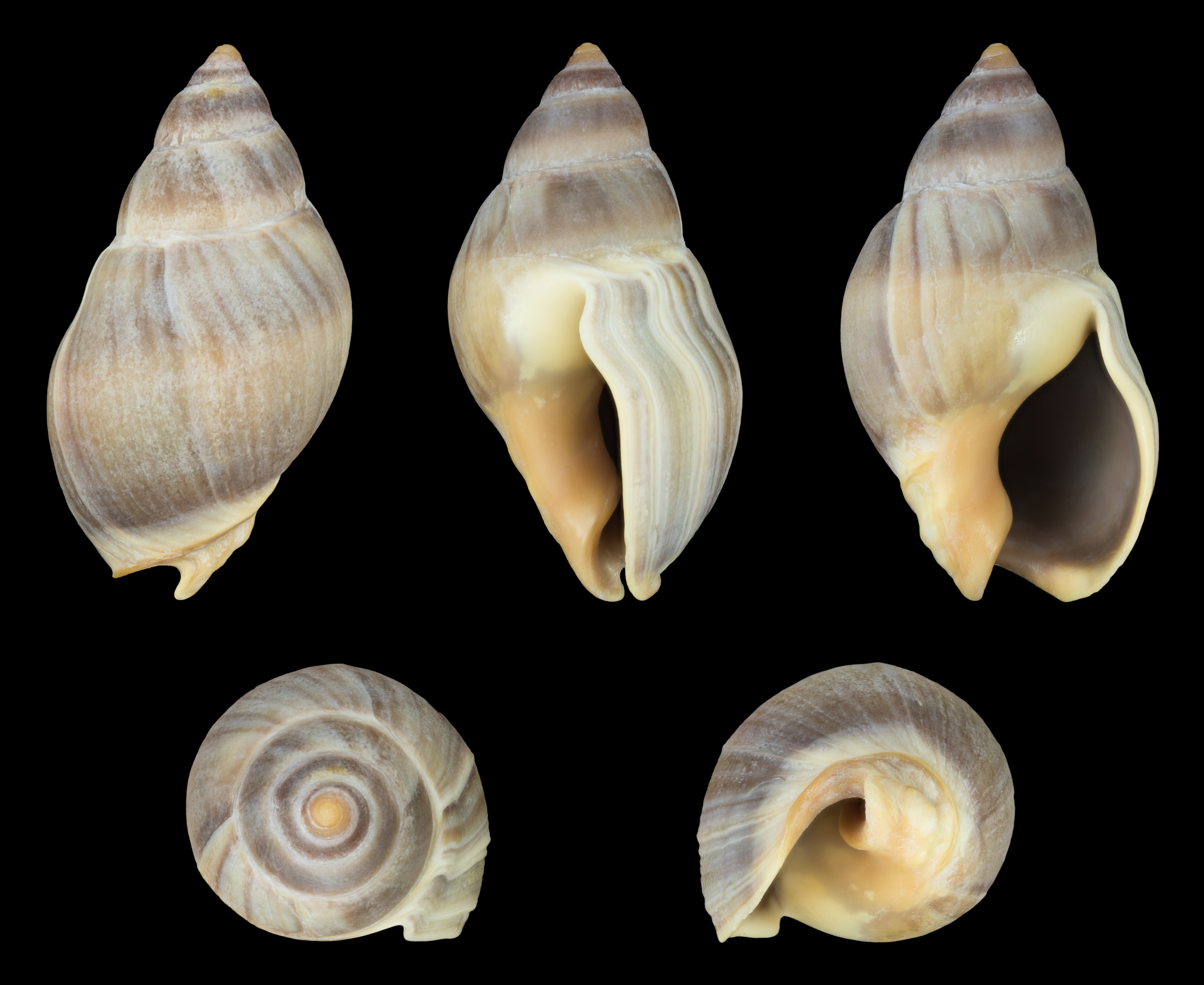
- A shell of Buccinanops globulosus

Scientific classification
- Kingdom: Animalia
- Phylum: Mollusca
- Class: Gastropoda
- Subclass: Caenogastropoda
- Order: Neogastropoda
- Family: Buccinanopsidae
- Genus: Buccinastrum
- Species: B. deforme

Binomial name
- Buccinastrum deforme (Kiener, 1834)

Synonyms
- Buccinanops deformis (P. P. King, 1832); Buccinanops globulosus (Kiener, 1834); Buccinanops globulosus var. elata Strebel, 1906; Buccinum ampullaceum Deshayes, 1844 (unnecessary substitute name for...); Buccinum deforme P. P. King, 1832 (original combination); Buccinum globulosum Kiener, 1834

= Buccinastrum deforme =

Species of gastropod

Buccinastrum deforme, common name the collared buccinum, is a species of sea snail, a marine gastropod mollusk in the family Buccinanopsidae, the Nassa mud snails or dog whelks and the like.

== Description ==
The size of the shell varies between 23 mm and 70 mm.

The ovate shell is smooth and ventricose. The spire is formed of six slightly convex whorls. The body whorl is very large and slightly canaliculated. The coloring is of a deep violet and oftentimes of a yellowish ash color, with a small white band which borders the base of each whorl of the spire. There exists also at the base of the shell, a large band of a grayish white color. Upon some specimens longitudinal whitish lines are seen, which are the vestiges of the several additions to the shell. The aperture is large and ovular. The columella is strongly arched, and upon all its length is seen a callosity of a yellowish color. The outer lip is of a reddish brown internally.

This shell is very different from other species in its form, which is globular, and its color, of a deep violet. In some specimens the spire is more elongated, and sometimes, within the shell, where it is of a paler violet, are delineated deeper bands. One only exists upon the upper whorls, and two broader upon the lowest.

== Distribution ==
This marine species occurs from Uruguay to Argentina.

== Imposex ==
The phenomenon known as imposex, the development of nonfunctional male sexual organs in female individuals, has been observed in B. deforme. This condition is triggered by exposure to organic tin compounds such as tributyltin (TBT) and triphenyltin (TPT), is irreversible, and can have severe consequences for gastropod species, ranging from individual sterilization to potential population collapse. Organotin compounds are commonly used as biocides and antifouling agents, added to marine paints to prevent organisms from growing on the hulls of boats and ships. As a result, high concentrations often accumulate in the waters around shipyards and docking areas, posing a serious threat to nearby marine life through prolonged exposure.
