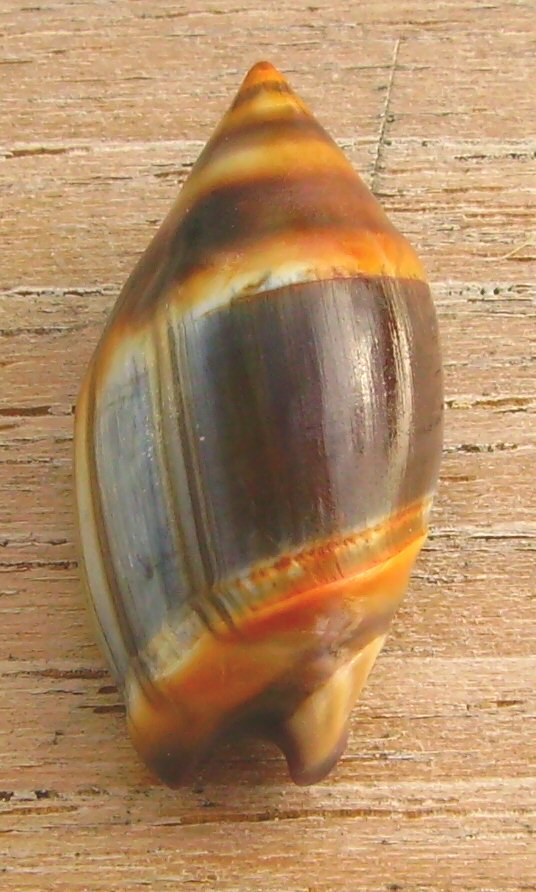
- A shell of Amalda australis

Scientific classification
- Kingdom: Animalia
- Phylum: Mollusca
- Class: Gastropoda
- Subclass: Caenogastropoda
- Order: Neogastropoda
- Family: Ancillariidae
- Genus: Amalda
- Species: A. australis

Binomial name
- Amalda australis (Sowerby I, 1830)

Synonyms
- Amalda (Baryspira) australis (G. B. Sowerby I, 1830)· accepted, alternate representation; † Amalda waikopiroensis (Suter, 1917); Ancillaria australis G.B. Sowerby I, 1830 (original combination); Ancillaria pyramidalis Reeve, 1864; Baryspira australis (G.B. Sowerby I, 1830); † Baryspira australis epacra Olson, 1956

= Amalda australis =

Species of gastropod

Amalda australis, common name the southern olive, is a medium-sized sea snail, a gastropod mollusc of the family Ancillariidae.

== Description ==
The length of the shell attains 52 mm, its diameter 23 mm.

The shell is elongate and fusiform, with a smooth, glossy surface. The spire is relatively short compared to the large, biangulate body whorl, and the overall shape is sleek and streamlined, allowing the snail to easily burrow into sand. The aperture is long and narrow, with a thin outer lip. The suture is covered by a transparent callus. The inner lip and the white columella are typically coated with a thin callus. The coloration of the shell varies from creamy white to light brown, often with subtle darker blue-brown bands or streaks. The fasciole and the interior of the shell is dark brown.

== Habitat ==
These predatory snails live in the intertidal sand, an environment that lends itself to high probability of fossilization. Amalda australis fossils date back to the Pliocene and reveal morphological stasis.

== Distribution ==
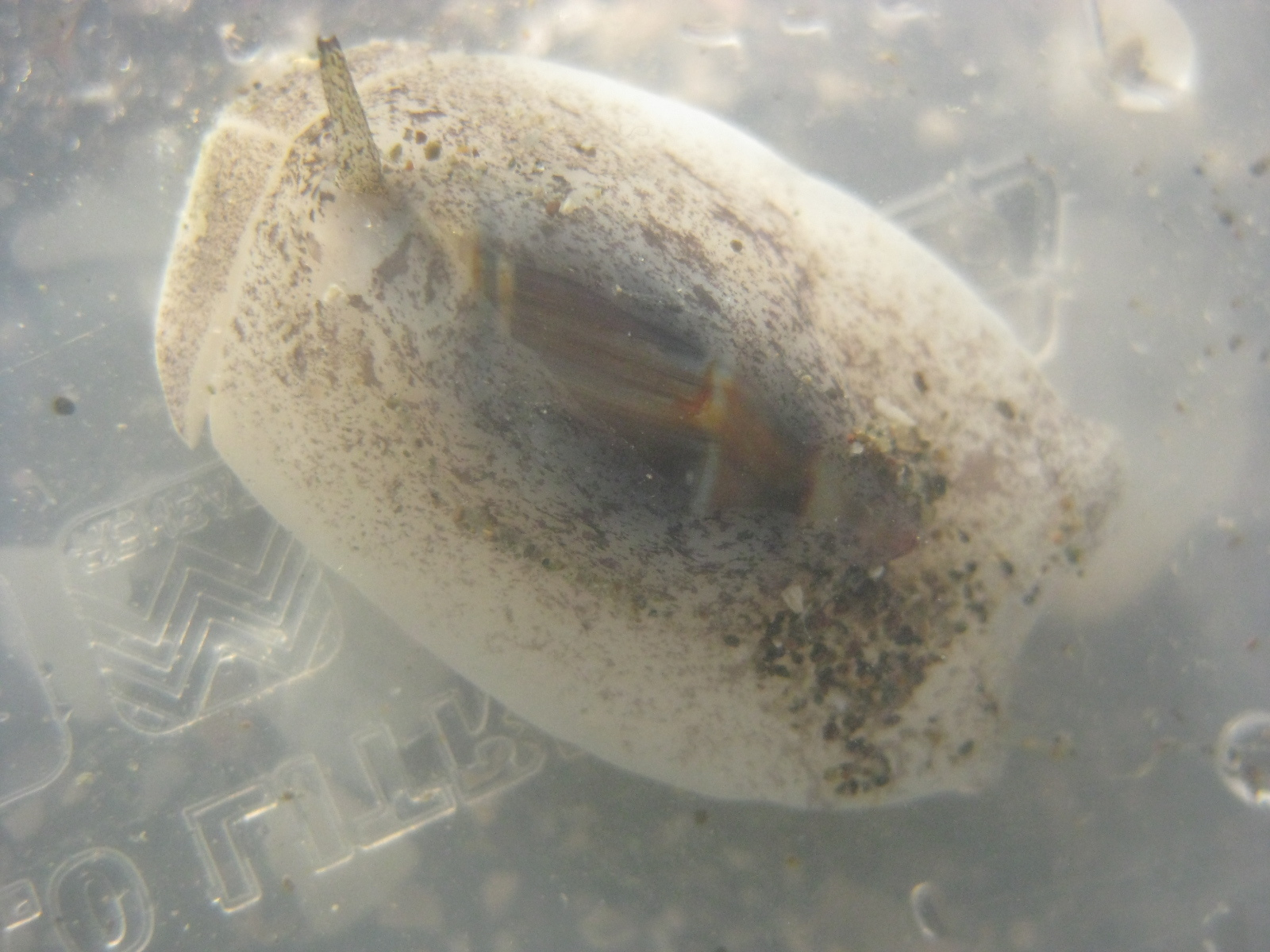
A live Amalda australis collected from seagrass bed at Kohimarama Beach, Auckland

This marine species is endemic to New Zealand. and occurs off North Island and northern part of South Island down to Banks Peninsula.
