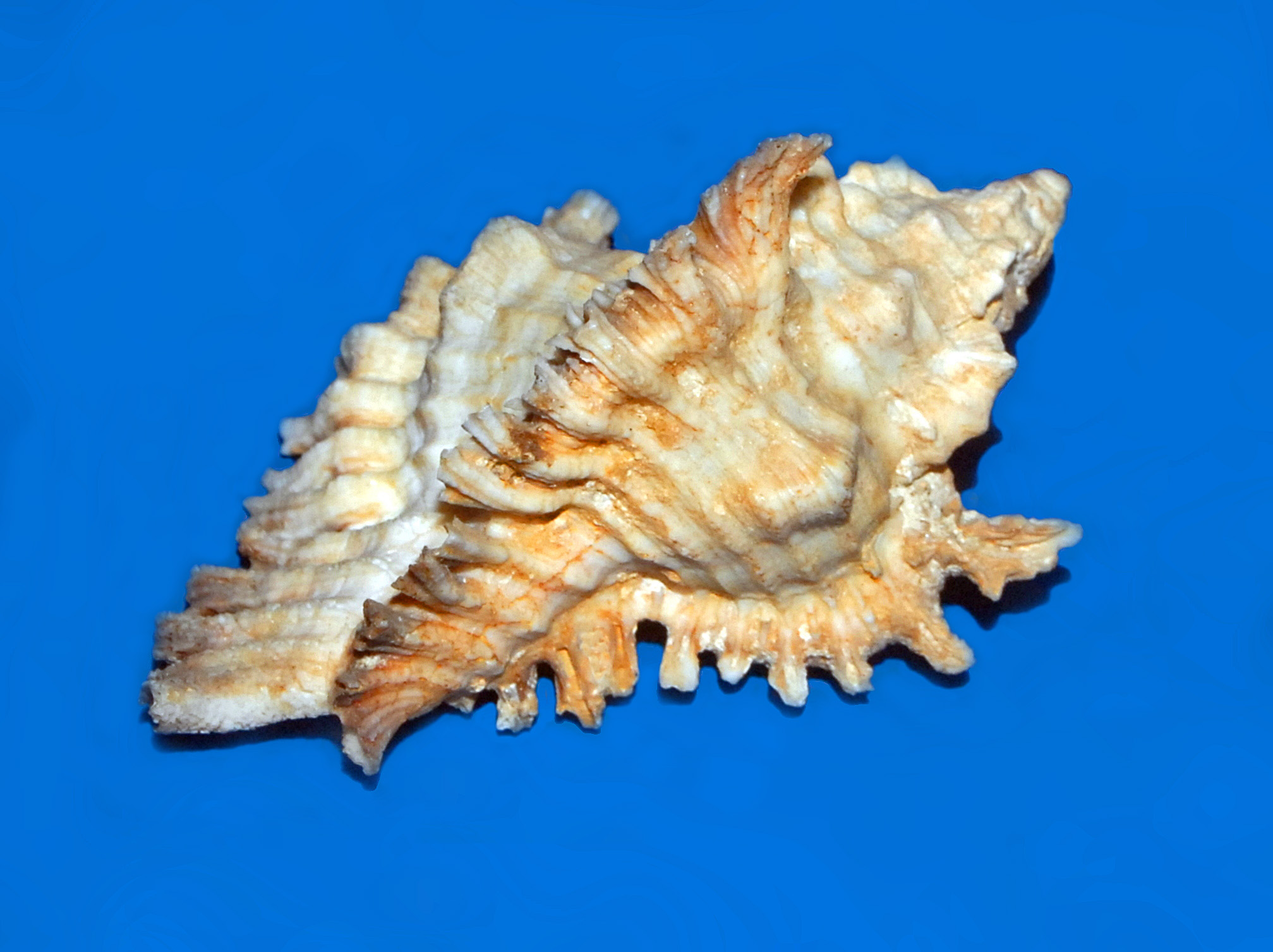
- Shell of Chicoreus florifer from Bahamas at the Museo Civico di Storia Naturale di Milano

Scientific classification
- Kingdom: Animalia
- Phylum: Mollusca
- Class: Gastropoda
- Subclass: Caenogastropoda
- Order: Neogastropoda
- Family: Muricidae
- Genus: Chicoreus
- Species: C. florifer

Binomial name
- Chicoreus florifer (Reeve, 1846)

Synonyms
- Chicoreus (Triplex) emilyae Petuch, 1987; Chicoreus (Triplex) florifer (Reeve, 1846); Chicoreus dilectus (A. Adams, 1855); Chicoreus rufus Lamarck, J.B.P.A. de, 1822; Murex arenarius Clench & Farfante, 1945; Murex dilectus A. Adams, 1855; Murex florifer Reeve, 1846; Murex rufus Lamarck, 1822; Murex salleanus A. Adams, 1854

= Chicoreus florifer =

Species of gastropod

Chicoreus florifer, common name : the flowery lace murex, is a species of sea snail, a marine gastropod mollusk in the family Muricidae, the murex snails or rock snails.

== Subspecies and formae ==
- Chicoreus florifer arenarius (f) Clench, W.J. & I. Pérez Farfante, 1945
- Chicoreus florifer dilectus (f) (Adams, A., 1855): the Florida lace murex (synonyms : Chicoreus florifer rachelcarsonae (f) Petuch, E.J., 1987; Chicoreus rachelcarsonae Petuch, E.J., 1987)
- Chicoreus florifer emilyae (f) Petuch, E.J., 1987

== Description ==
The shell size varies between 35 and 93 mm (1.4 and 3.7 in). This shell is relatively elongate or fusoid and has a typical muricid outline. Three axial varices are present along its body whorl, each one ornamented by a characteristic row of leafy spines. Between the varices there is a shouldered axial rib. Aperture is small and subcircular. The outer apertural lip is dentate. The surface of the shell may be cream, pale rust-brown or deep brownish black. The interior is usually white.

== Distribution ==
This species is distributed in the Gulf of Mexico, the Caribbean Sea and along North Carolina, Florida and the Bahamas.
