= Buccinanopsidae =

Scientific classification
- Kingdom: Animalia
- Phylum: Mollusca
- Class: Gastropoda
- Subclass: Caenogastropoda
- Order: Neogastropoda
- Superfamily: Buccinoidea
- Family: Buccinanopsidae; Galindo, Puillandre, Lozouet & Bouchet, 2016

Genera
- See text

Synonyms
- Buccinanopsinae Galindo, Puillandre, Lozouet & Bouchet, 2016 (original rank)

Family of large sea snails

The Buccinanopsidae are a taxonomic family of large sea snails, often known as whelks in the superfamily Buccinoidea.

== Genera ==
- Buccinanops d'Orbigny, 1841
- Buccinastrum Pastorino & Simone, 2021
