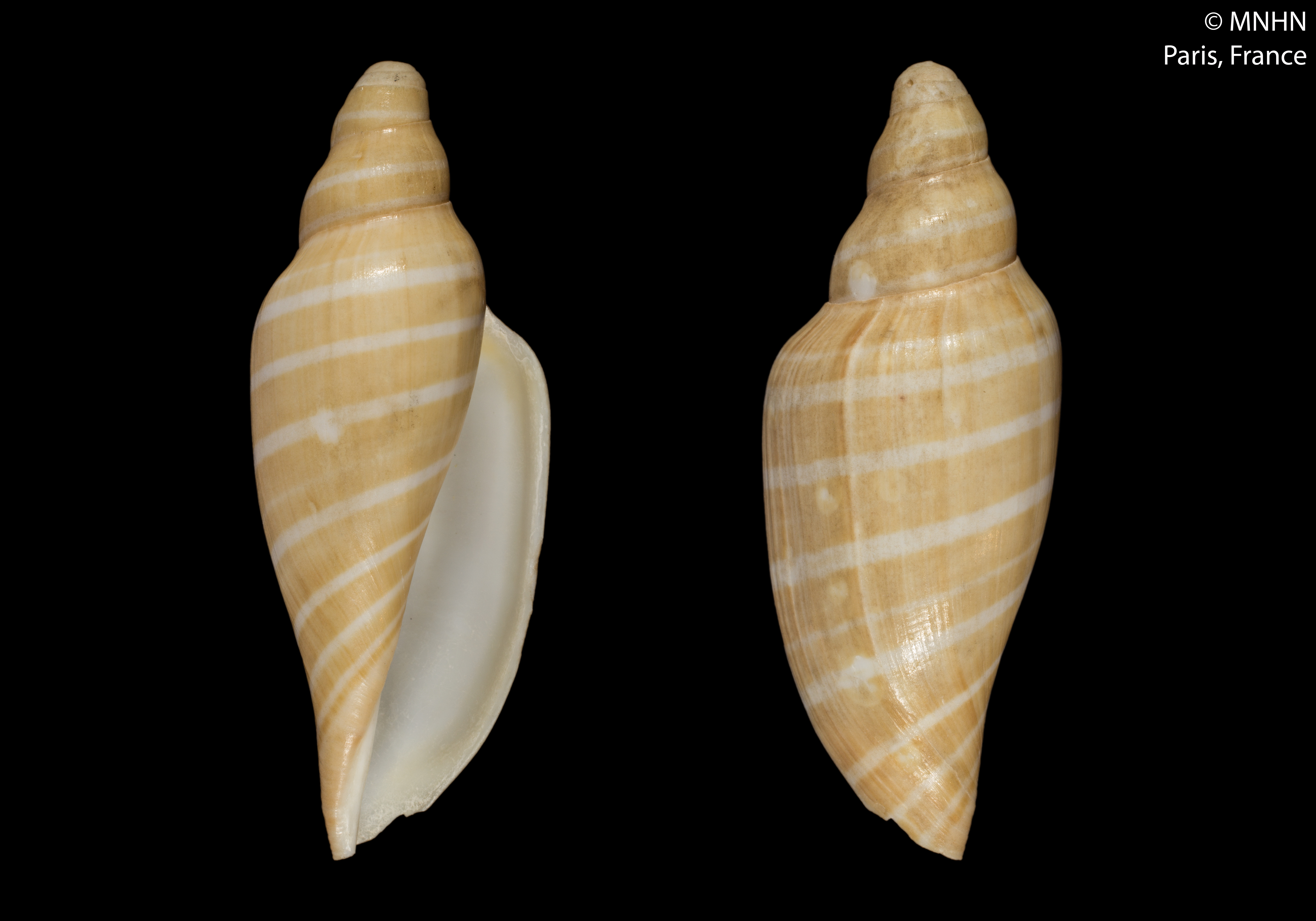
- Shell of Scaphella gaudiati (holotype at MNHN, Paris)

Scientific classification
- Kingdom: Animalia
- Phylum: Mollusca
- Class: Gastropoda
- Subclass: Caenogastropoda
- Order: Neogastropoda
- Superfamily: Volutoidea
- Family: Volutidae
- Genus: Scaphella; Swainson, 1832

Type species
- Voluta junonia Lamarck, 1804

Synonyms
- Aurinia H. Adams & A. Adams, 1853; Clenchina Pilsbry & Olsson, 1953; Fulguraria (Aurinia) H. Adams & A. Adams, 1854; Maculopeplum Dall, 1906; Rehderia Clench, 1946; Scaphella (Aurinia) A. & H. Adams, 1853 · alternate representation; Scaphella (Caricellopsis) Petuch & Sargent, 2011 · alternate representation; Scaphella (Clenchina) Pilsbry & Olsson, 1953; Scaphella (Scaphella) Swainson, 1832 · alternate representation; Voluta (Scaphella) Swainson, 1832

= Scaphella =

Genus of gastropods

Scaphella is a genus of large sea snails, marine gastropod mollusks in the family Volutidae, the volutes.

== Distribution ==
This is a tropical genus occurring in the Western Atlantic Ocean and the Caribbean Sea.

== Description ==
There are both living and fossil species in this genus, which first appeared in the Paleocene. The fusiform, patterned shell is small to large. The protoconch is smooth and papilliform, often with a calcarella. The columellar plates are weak or absent. The periostracum is present, but an operculum is not. The radula is small, and variable from Y-shaped to tricuspid.

(Described as Aurinia) The shell is ovately fusiform. The spire has a mamillated apex. The whorls are transversely finely striated and longitudinally subplicate. The folds of the columella are obsolete. The outer lip is thin and simple.

== Species ==
Species within the genus Scaphella include:

- Scaphella atlantis Clench, 1946
- † Scaphella baudoni (Deshayes, 1865)
- Scaphella biminiensis Oleinik, Petuch & Aley IV, 2012
- Scaphella contoyensis Emerson & Old, 1979
- Scaphella dohrni (G.B. Sowerby III, 1903)
- Scaphella dubia (Broderip, 1827) - Dubious Volute
- Scaphella evelina F. M. Bayer, 1971
- Scaphella garciai Bail, 2007
- Scaphella gaudiati Bail & Shelton, 2001
- Scaphella gouldiana (Dall, 1887)
- Scaphella junonia (Lamarck, 1804) - type species
- † Scaphella kendrae Petuch & Berschauer, 2021
- Scaphella luizcoutoi Coltro, 1998
- Scaphella macginnorum García & Emerson, 1987
- † Scaphella macrocephala Finlay, 1927
- † Scaphella martinshugari Petuch, 1994
- Scaphella matchetti Petuch & Sargent, 2011
- Scaphella neptunia (Clench & Aguayo, 1940)
- Scaphella robusta Dall, 1889
- Scaphella stimpsonorum T. Cossignani & Allary, 2019

Species brought into synonymy

- Scaphella benthalis Dall, 1896: synonym of Arctomelon benthale (Dall, 1896)
- Scaphella butleri Clench, 1953: synonym of Scaphella junonia butleri Clench, 1953
- Scaphella carlae Landau & C. M. Silva, 2006 †: synonym of Euroscaphella carlae (Landau & C. M. Silva, 2006) †
- Scaphella caroli Iredale, 1924: synonym of Amoria maculata (Swainson, 1822)
- Scaphella cognata Finlay, 1926 †: synonym of Teremelon cognata (Finlay, 1926) †
- Scaphella dannevigi Verco, 1912: synonym of Livonia nodiplicata (Cox, 1910)
- Scaphella elegantissima Suter, 1917 †: synonym of Teremelon elegantissima (Suter, 1917) † (original combination)
- Scaphella florida (Clench & Aguayo, 1940): synonym of Scaphella dohrni (G. B. Sowerby III, 1903)
- Scaphella hedleyi Iredale, 1914: synonym of Amoria (Amoria) damoni Gray, 1864 represented as Amoria damoni Gray, 1864
- Scaphella honi Glibert, 1938 †: synonym of Euroscaphella honi (Glibert, 1938) †
- Scaphella johnstoneae Clench, 1953: synonym of Scaphella junonia (Lamarck, 1804)
- Scaphella lamberti (J. Sowerby, 1816) †: synonym of Euroscaphella lamberti (J. Sowerby, 1816) †
- Scaphella lautenschlageri Volobueva, 1981 †: synonym of Arctomelon lautenschlageri (Volobueva, 1981) † (original combination)
- Scaphella marionae (Pilsbry & Olsson, 1953): synonym of Scaphella robusta marionae (Pilsbry & Olsson, 1953)
- Scaphella moslemica Hedley, 1912: synonym of Amoria undulata (Lamarck, 1804)
- Scaphella papillaris Swainson, 1840: synonym of Ericusa papillosa (Swainson, 1822)
- Scaphella pretiosa Finlay, 1926 †: synonym of Teremelon pretiosa (Finlay, 1926) †
- Scaphella tumidior Finlay, 1926 †: synonym of Teremelon tumidior (Finlay, 1926) †
- Scaphella veliocassina Pacaud & Meyer, 2014 †: synonym of Euroscaphella veliocassina (Pacaud & Meyer, 2014) †
- Scaphella victoriensis Cossmann, 1899 †: synonym of Notopeplum politum (Tate, 1889) † (unnecessary replacement name for Voluta polita Tate, 1889, erroneously stated by Cossmann to be a junior homonym of Voluta polita Conrad)
- Scaphella vignyensis Chavan, 1949 †: synonym of Euroscaphella vignyensis (Chavan, 1949) †
- Scaphella volvestrensis Villatte, 1962 †: synonym of Euroscaphella volvestrensis (Villatte, 1962) †
- Scaphella worki Coltro J., 1998: synonym of Scaphella robusta marionae (Pilsbry & Olsson, 1953)
