= Scaphella contoyensis =

Scientific classification
- Kingdom: Animalia
- Phylum: Mollusca
- Class: Gastropoda
- Subclass: Caenogastropoda
- Order: Neogastropoda
- Family: Volutidae
- Genus: Scaphella
- Species: S. contoyensis

Binomial name
- Scaphella contoyensis Emerson & W. E. Old jr., 1979

Species of gastropod

Scaphella contoyensis is a species of sea snail, a marine gastropod mollusk in the family Volutidae, the volutes.

== Description ==
The shells are fusiform. They are said to be similar to species of Ericusa and Cymbiolista in color and size, though they lack spines.

== Distribution ==
Gulf of Mexico, Yucatán area.
