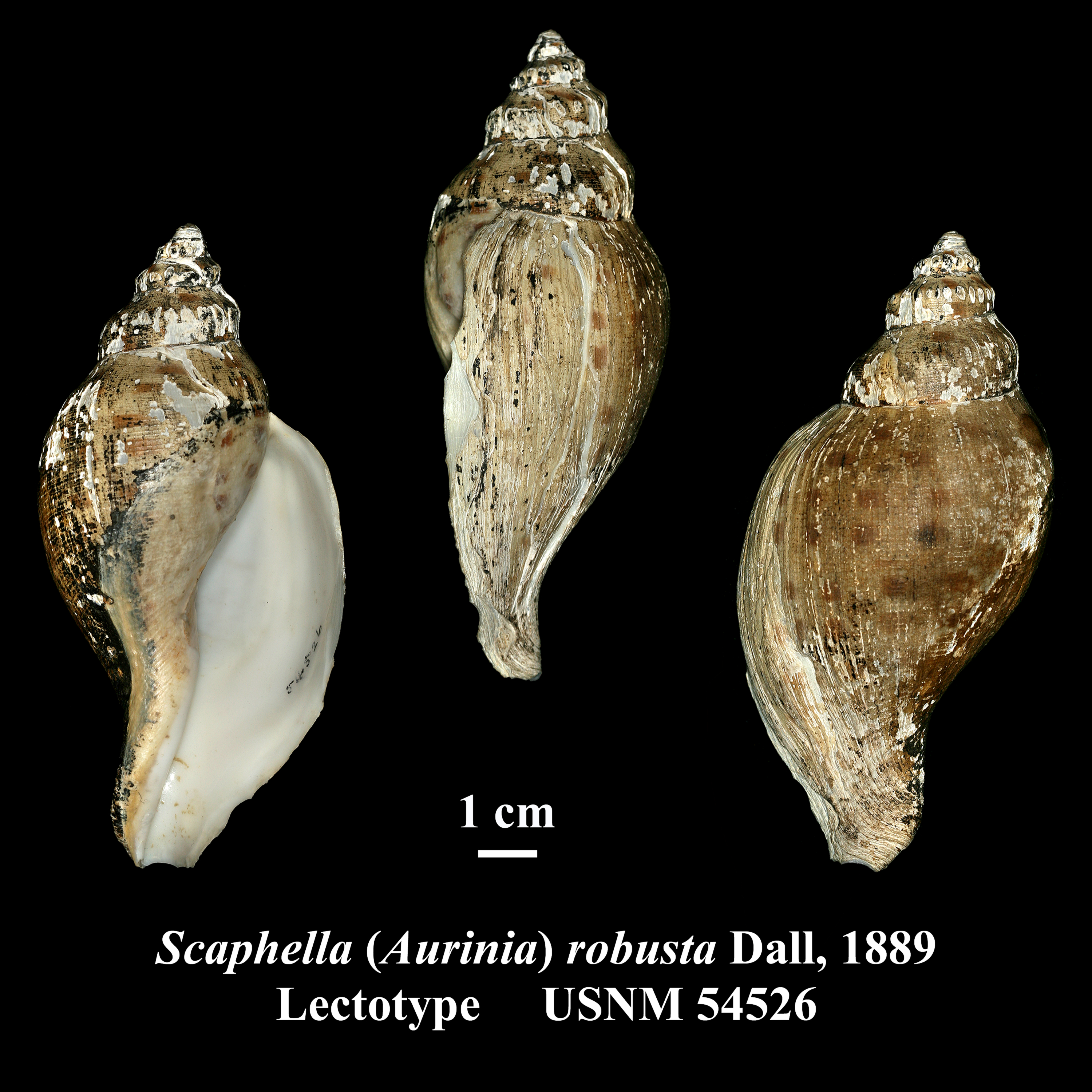

Scientific classification
- Kingdom: Animalia
- Phylum: Mollusca
- Class: Gastropoda
- Subclass: Caenogastropoda
- Order: Neogastropoda
- Family: Volutidae
- Genus: Scaphella
- Species: S. robusta

Binomial name
- Scaphella robusta (Dall, 1889)

Synonyms
- Aurinia robusta Dall, 1889; Clenchina robusta (Dall, 1889); Scaphella (Aurinia) cuba Clench, 1946; Scaphella (Scaphella) robusta (Dall, 1889) · alternate representation

= Scaphella robusta =

Species of gastropod

Scaphella robusta is a species of sea snail, a marine gastropod mollusc in the family Volutidae, the volutes.

Subspecies

- Scaphella robusta marionae (Pilsbry & Olsson, 1953)
- Scaphella robusta robusta (Dall, 1889)
- Scaphella robusta worki Coltro, 1998: synonym of Scaphella robusta marionae (Pilsbry & Olsson, 1953)
