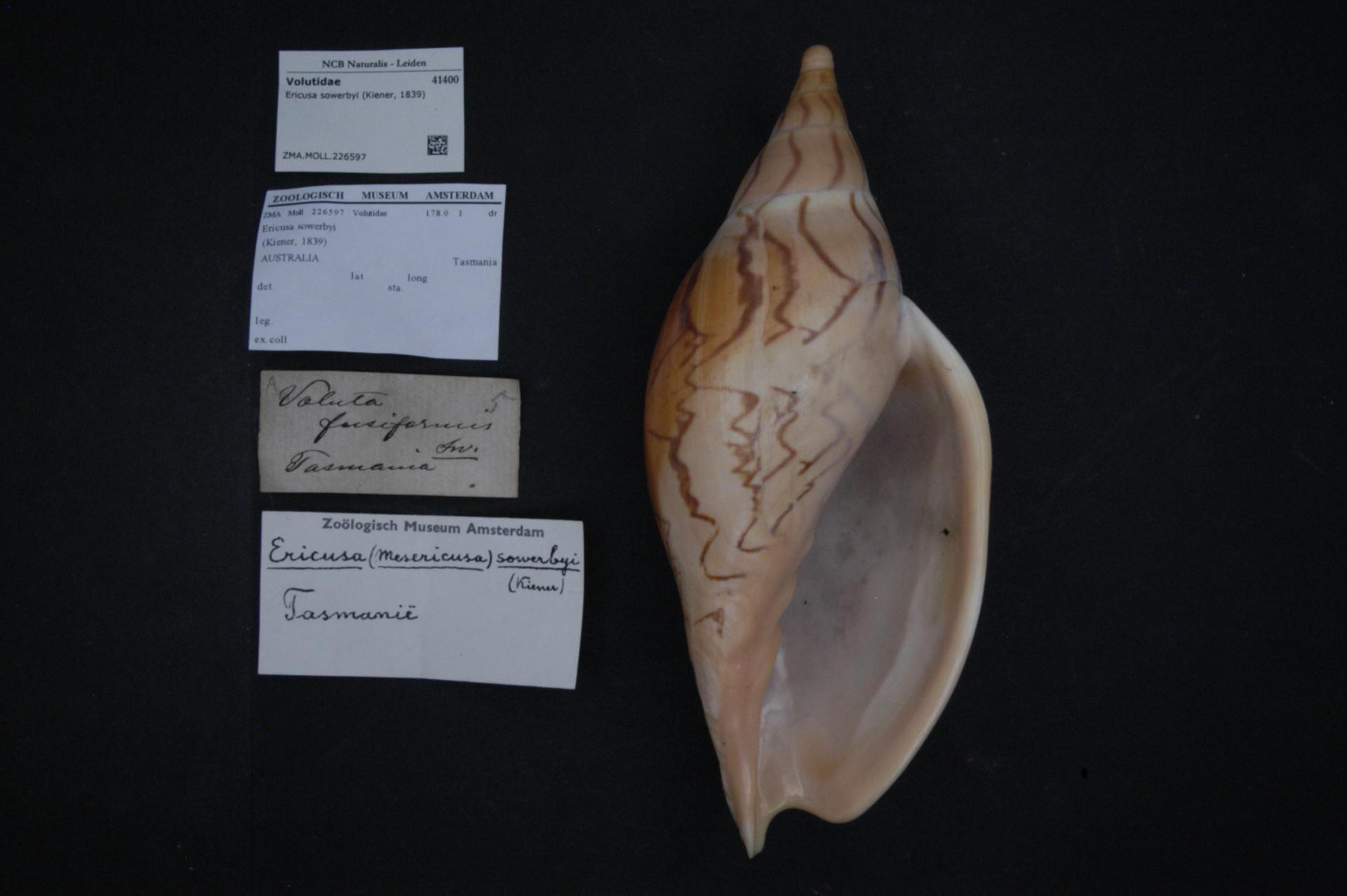

Scientific classification
- Kingdom: Animalia
- Phylum: Mollusca
- Class: Gastropoda
- Subclass: Caenogastropoda
- Order: Neogastropoda
- Family: Volutidae
- Genus: Ericusa
- Species: E. sowerbyi

Binomial name
- Ericusa sowerbyi (Kiener, 1839)

Synonyms
- Mesericusa sowerbyi perspecta Iredale, 1929; Mesericusa sowerbyi porcellana Jackson, 1954; Voluta fusiformis Swainson, 1822

= Ericusa sowerbyi =

Species of gastropod

Ericusa sowerbyi, common name the spindle-shaped volute, is a species of sea snail, a marine gastropod mollusk in the family Volutidae, the volutes.

== Description ==
The shell of Ericusa sowerbyi is medium to heavy in weight with a prominent protoconch and slightly rounded spire whorls. The body whorl is weakly shouldered and slightly concave between the suture and shoulder. The columella features three strong plaits. The outer lip is thickened internally at the posterior end and flared at the anterior end. The shell's background color is cream or pale tan, adorned with wavy axial brown lines and a pale band below the suture. The interior is pinkish cream. Adults range from 88 to 285 mm in length.

== Distribution ==
It is endemic to Australia, found from Cape Moreton, Queensland to Kangaroo Island, South Australia, including Tasmania.
