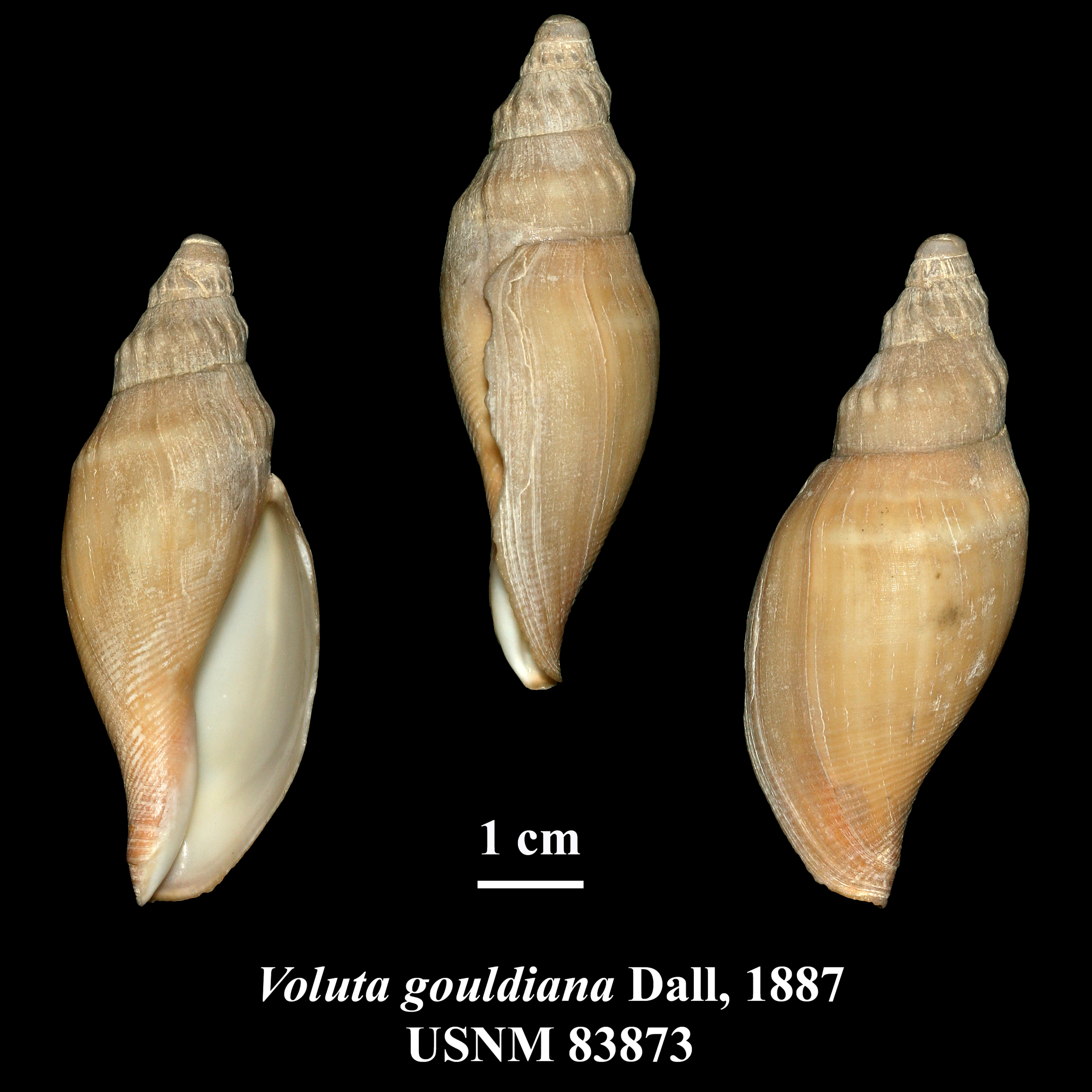

Scientific classification
- Kingdom: Animalia
- Phylum: Mollusca
- Class: Gastropoda
- Subclass: Caenogastropoda
- Order: Neogastropoda
- Family: Volutidae
- Genus: Scaphella
- Species: S. gouldiana

Binomial name
- Scaphella gouldiana (Dall, 1887)

= Scaphella gouldiana =

Species of gastropod

Scaphella gouldiana, commonly known as the banded volute is a species of sea snail, a marine gastropod mollusk in the family Volutidae, the volutes.

== Description ==
This species attains a size of 56 mm (2.2 in).

== Distribution ==
Western Atlantic Ocean: off East coast Florida, in deeper waters, 50 fathoms.
