= Scaphella luizcoutoi =

Scientific classification
- Kingdom: Animalia
- Phylum: Mollusca
- Class: Gastropoda
- Subclass: Caenogastropoda
- Order: Neogastropoda
- Family: Volutidae
- Genus: Scaphella
- Species: S. luizcoutoi

Binomial name
- Scaphella luizcoutoi Coltro, 1998

Species of gastropod

Scaphella luizcoutoi is a species of sea snail, a marine gastropod mollusk in the family Volutidae, the volutes.
