= Scaphella macginnorum =

Scientific classification
- Kingdom: Animalia
- Phylum: Mollusca
- Class: Gastropoda
- Subclass: Caenogastropoda
- Order: Neogastropoda
- Family: Volutidae
- Genus: Scaphella
- Species: S. macginnorum

Binomial name
- Scaphella macginnorum Garcia & Emerson, 1987

Species of gastropod

Scaphella macginnorum is a species of sea snail, a marine gastropod mollusk in the family Volutidae, the volutes.

== Description ==
This large species attains a length of 270 mm.

== Distribution ==
Caribbean Sea, on the continental shelf of Quintana Roo: Campeche Bank, South-Eastern Mexico.
