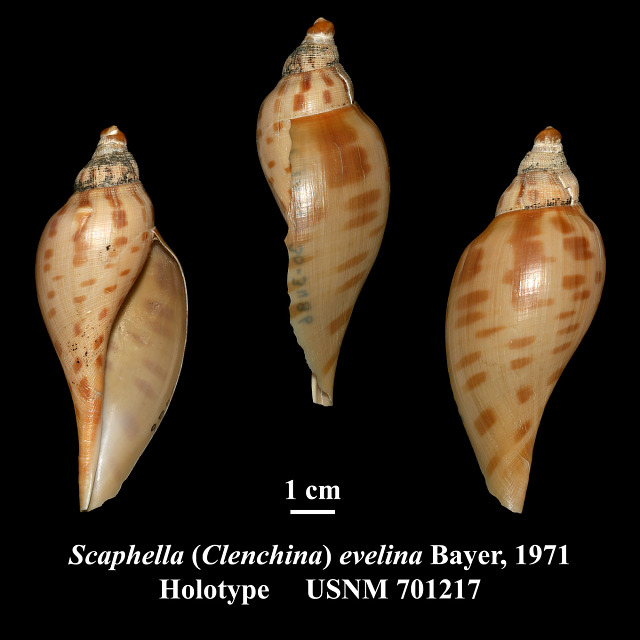

Scientific classification
- Kingdom: Animalia
- Phylum: Mollusca
- Class: Gastropoda
- Subclass: Caenogastropoda
- Order: Neogastropoda
- Family: Volutidae
- Genus: Scaphella
- Species: S. evelina

Binomial name
- Scaphella evelina Bayer, 1971

= Scaphella evelina =

Species of gastropod

Scaphella evelina, commonly known as the Evelyn's volute is a species of sea snail, a marine gastropod mollusk in the family Volutidae, the volutes.
