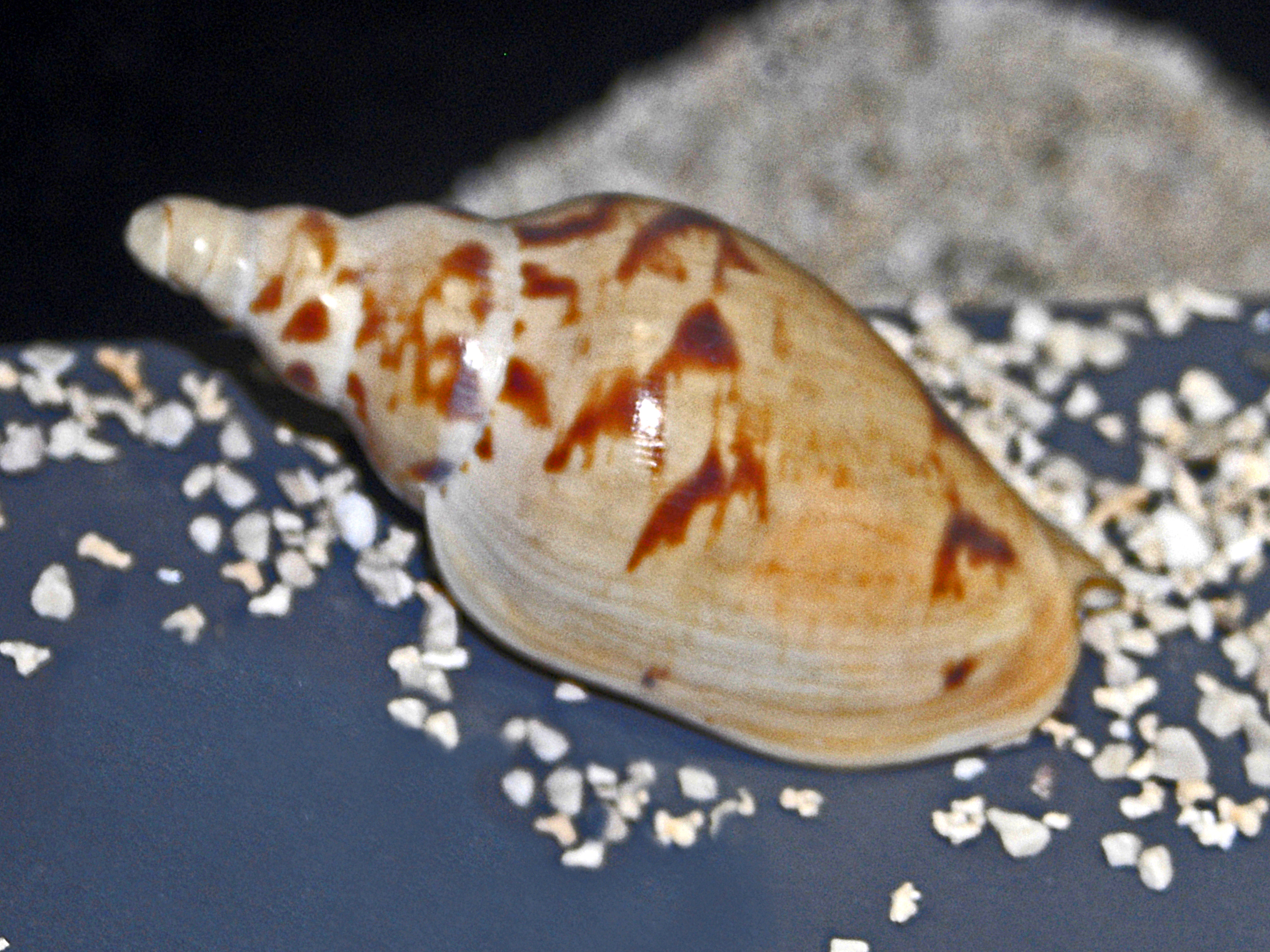
- A shell of Ericusa fulgetrum

Scientific classification
- Kingdom: Animalia
- Phylum: Mollusca
- Class: Gastropoda
- Subclass: Caenogastropoda
- Order: Neogastropoda
- Family: Volutidae
- Genus: Ericusa
- Species: E. fulgetrum

Binomial name
- Ericusa fulgetrum (Sowerby I, 1825)

Synonyms
- Ericusa orca Cotton, 1952

= Ericusa fulgetrum =

Species of sea snail

Ericusa fulgetrum, the lightning volute, is a species of sea snail, a marine gastropod mollusk in the family Volutidae, the volutes.

== Etymology ==
The species Latin name fulgetrum means "lightning" (hence the common name).

== Description ==
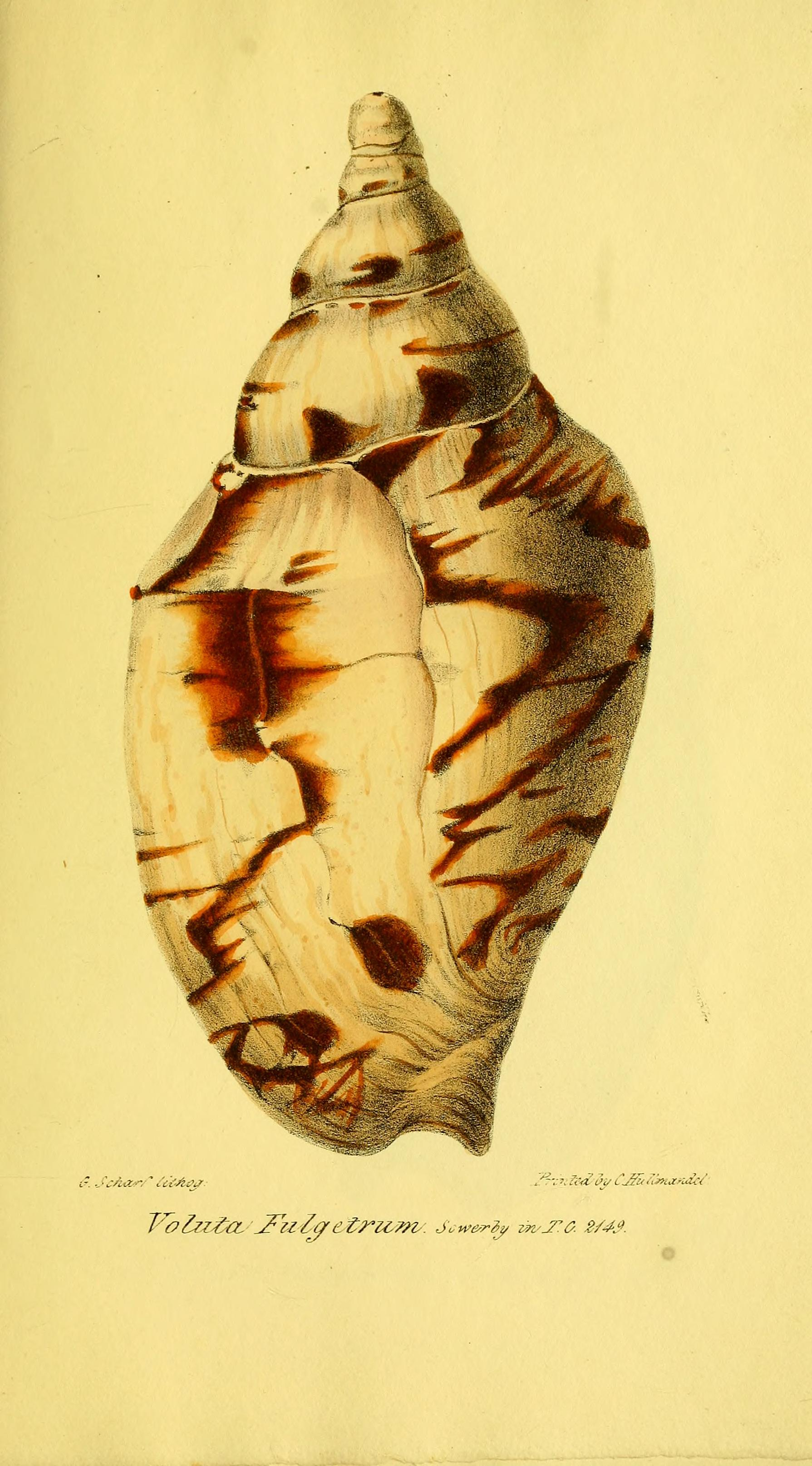
Illustration of E. fulgetrum.

The shell of Ericusa fulgetrum can reach a length of 75–200 millimetres (3.0–7.9 in). It is solid and fusiform. The colour pattern is quite variable, the base colour may be yellowish, pale brown or reddish. It has a glossy marbled surface, sometimes with dark brown zig-zag bands. The whorls are regular and convex. Protoconch is smooth and rounded and the aperture is elongate, with a thickened outer lip. This nocturnal snail predates on small invertebrates.

== Distribution ==
This species can be found in South Australia.
