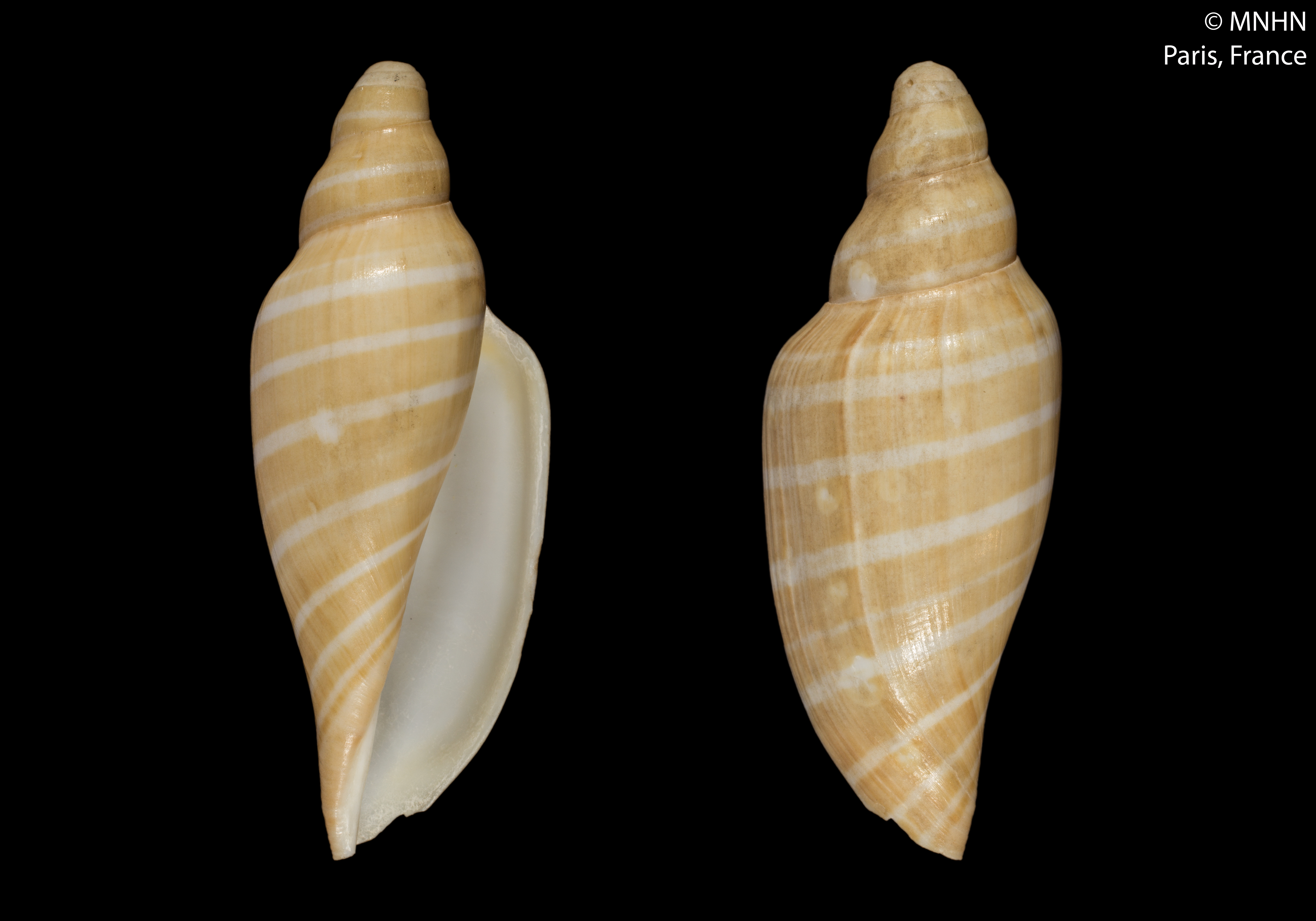
- Shell of Scaphella gaudiati (holotype at MNHN, Paris)

Scientific classification
- Kingdom: Animalia
- Phylum: Mollusca
- Class: Gastropoda
- Subclass: Caenogastropoda
- Order: Neogastropoda
- Family: Volutidae
- Genus: Scaphella
- Species: S. gaudiati

Binomial name
- Scaphella gaudiati Bail & Shelton, 1999

Synonyms
- Scaphella (Scaphella) gaudiati Bail & Shelton, 2001 · alternate representation

= Scaphella gaudiati =

Species of gastropod

Scaphella gaudiati is a species of sea snail, a marine gastropod mollusk in the family Volutidae, the volutes.
