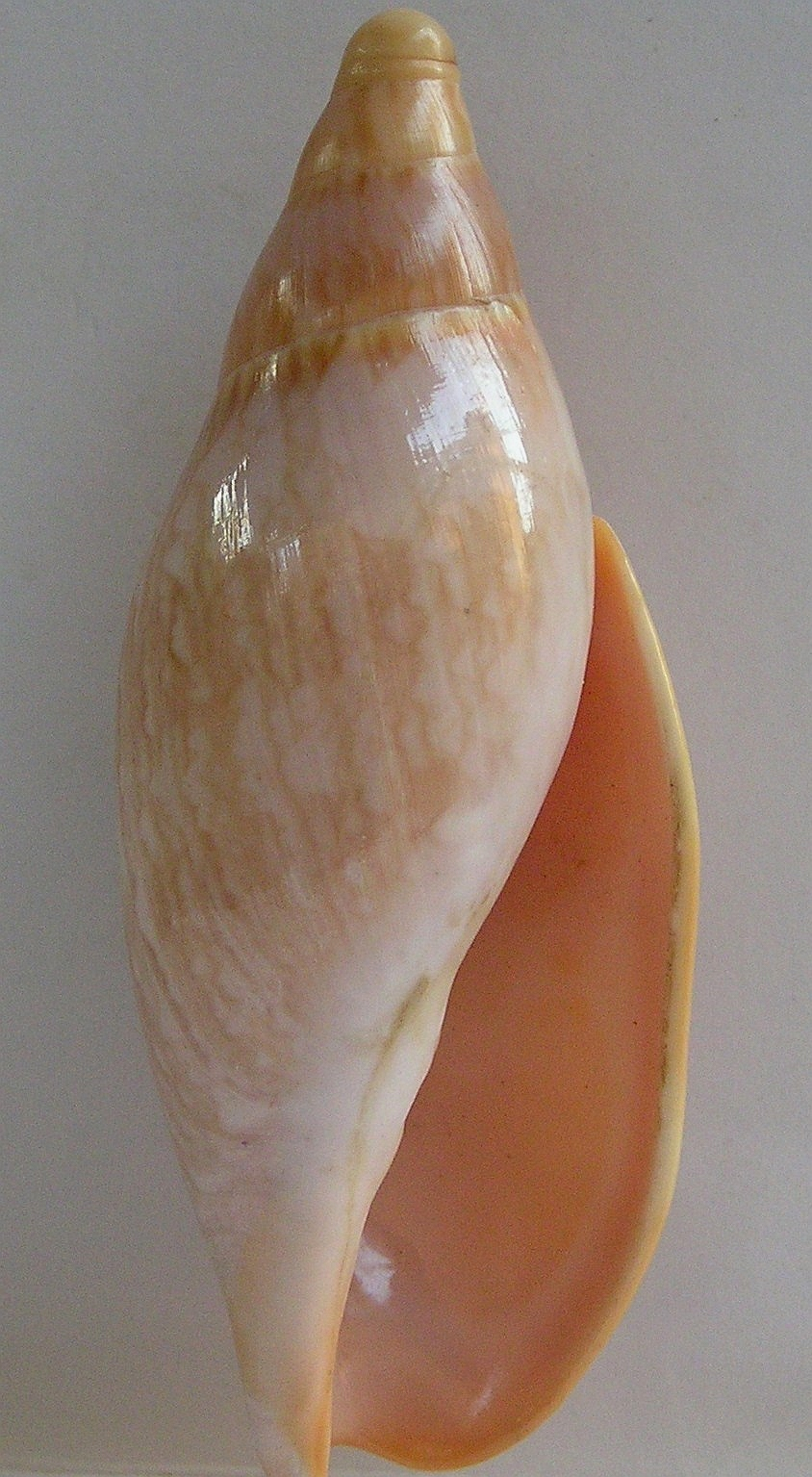
- Ericusa sericata

Scientific classification
- Kingdom: Animalia
- Phylum: Mollusca
- Class: Gastropoda
- Subclass: Caenogastropoda
- Order: Neogastropoda
- Family: Volutidae
- Genus: Ericusa
- Species: E. sericata

Binomial name
- Ericusa sericata Thornley, 1951

= Ericusa sericata =

Species of gastropod

Ericusa sericata, common name : the silk-like volute, is a species of sea snail, a marine gastropod mollusk in the family Volutidae, the volutes.

== Description ==
The size of the shell varies between 75 mm and 125 mm.

== Distribution ==
This species is distributed in the Pacific Ocean along Eastern Australia (Queensland, New South Wales).
