= Scaphella garciai =

Scientific classification
- Kingdom: Animalia
- Phylum: Mollusca
- Class: Gastropoda
- Subclass: Caenogastropoda
- Order: Neogastropoda
- Family: Volutidae
- Genus: Scaphella
- Species: S. garciai

Binomial name
- Scaphella garciai Bail, 2008

Species of gastropod

Scaphella garciai is a species of sea snail, a marine gastropod mollusk in the family Volutidae, the volutes.
