= Scaphella dohrni =

Scientific classification
- Kingdom: Animalia
- Phylum: Mollusca
- Class: Gastropoda
- Subclass: Caenogastropoda
- Order: Neogastropoda
- Family: Volutidae
- Genus: Scaphella
- Species: S. dohrni

Binomial name
- Scaphella dohrni (Sowerby III, 1903)

Synonyms
- Aurinia bermudezi Clench & Aguayo, 1940; Scaphella (Scaphella) dohrni (G.B. Sowerby III, 1903); Voluta dohrni G.B. Sowerby III, 1903 (basionym)

Species of gastropod

Scaphella dohrni, commonly known as the Dohrn's volute is a species of sea snail, a marine gastropod mollusk in the family Volutidae, the volutes.

== Distribution ==
This species occurs in the Gulf of Mexico and off Florida.
