= Scaphella robusta marionae =

Scientific classification
- Kingdom: Animalia
- Phylum: Mollusca
- Class: Gastropoda
- Subclass: Caenogastropoda
- Order: Neogastropoda
- Family: Volutidae
- Genus: Scaphella
- Species: S. robusta
- Subspecies: S. r. marionae

Trinomial name
- Scaphella robusta marionae (Pilsbry & Olsson, 1953)

Synonyms
- Clenchina robusta marionae Pilsbry & Olsson, 1953 (original combination); Scaphella (Scaphella) robusta worki Coltro, 1998; Scaphella marionae (Pilsbry & Olsson, 1953); Scaphella robusta worki Coltro, 1998; Scaphella worki J. Coltro, 1998 ·

Species of gastropod

Scaphella robusta marionae is a subspecies of sea snail, a marine gastropod mollusc in the family Volutidae, the votules.
