= Scaphella atlantis =

Scientific classification
- Kingdom: Animalia
- Phylum: Mollusca
- Class: Gastropoda
- Subclass: Caenogastropoda
- Order: Neogastropoda
- Family: Volutidae
- Genus: Scaphella
- Species: S. atlantis

Binomial name
- Scaphella atlantis Clench, 1946

Species of gastropod

Scaphella atlantis, commonly known as the Atlantis volute is a species of sea snail, a marine gastropod mollusk in the family Volutidae, the volutes.
