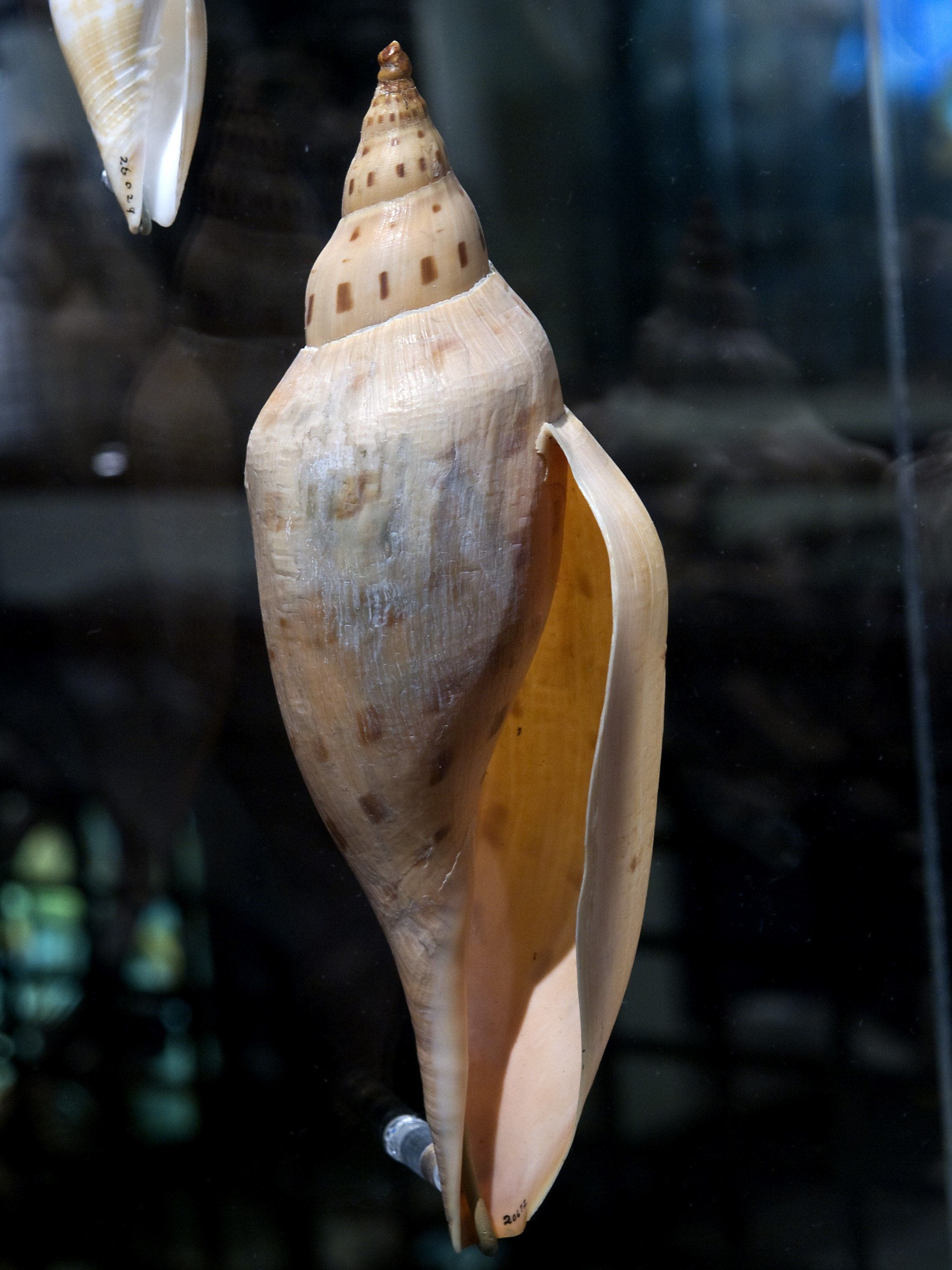
- A shell of Scaphella dubia kieneri Clench, 1946 Keiner’s Volute

Scientific classification
- Kingdom: Animalia
- Phylum: Mollusca
- Class: Gastropoda
- Subclass: Caenogastropoda
- Order: Neogastropoda
- Family: Volutidae
- Genus: Scaphella
- Species: S. dubia

Binomial name
- Scaphella dubia (Broderip, 1827)

Synonyms
- Voluta dubia Broderip, 1827; Fulgoraria dubia (Broderip, 1827); Aurinia dubia (Broderip, 1827); Scapha dubia (Broderip, 1827); Fusus tessellatus auct. non Schubert & Wagner, 1829; Aurinia schmitti Bartsch, 1931; Rehderia schmitti (Bartsch, 1931); Rehderia georgiana Clench, 1946; Aurinia georgiana (Clench, 1946); Scaphella kieneri Clench, 1946; Auriniopsis kieneri (Clench, 1946); Aurinia kieneri (Clench, 1946); Aurinia ethelae Pilsbry & Olsson, 1953

= Scaphella dubia =

Species of gastropod

Scaphella dubia, common name the dubious volute, is a species of sea snail, a marine gastropod mollusk in the family Volutidae, the volutes.
