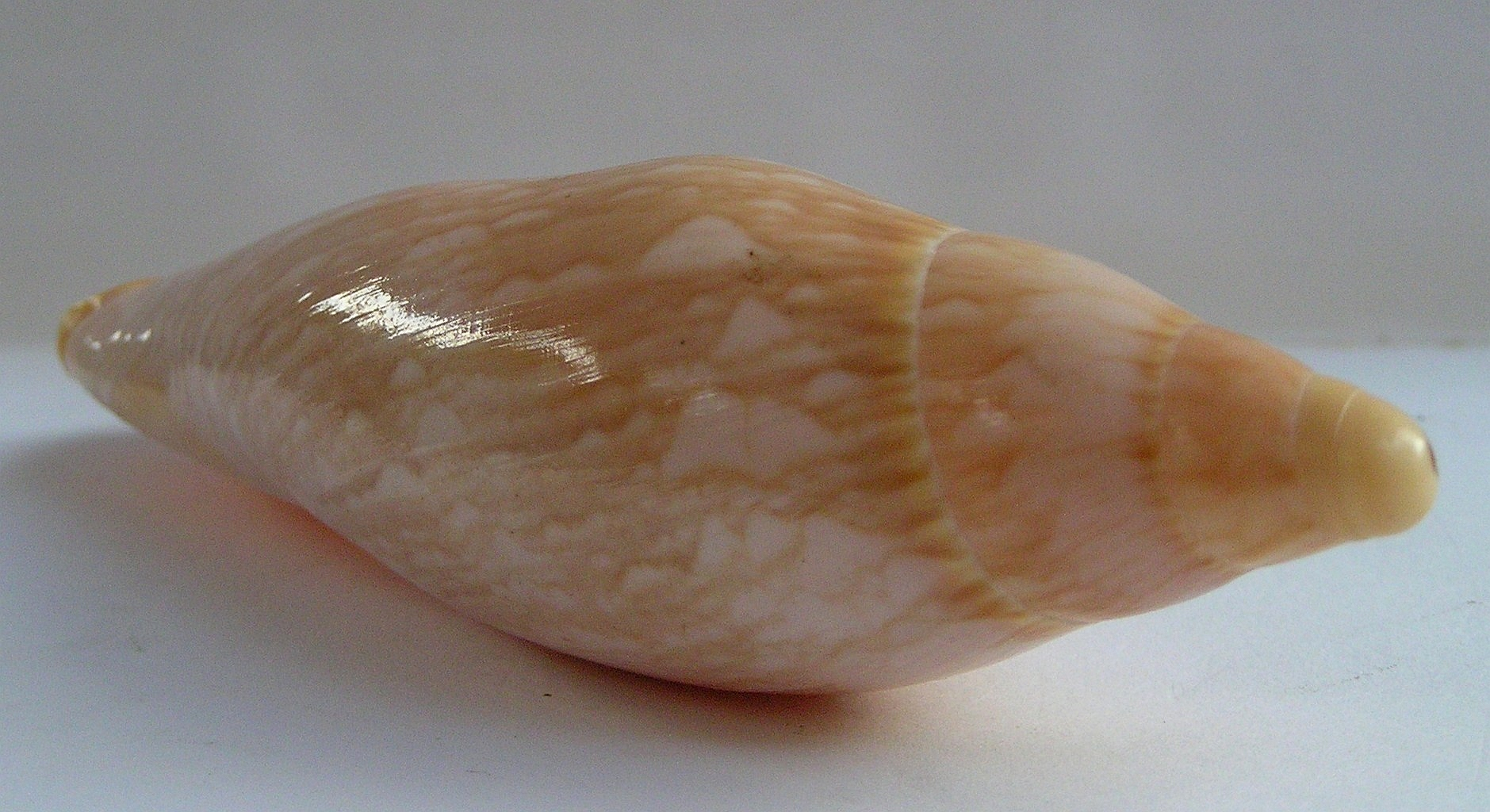
- Ericusa sericata

Scientific classification
- Kingdom: Animalia
- Phylum: Mollusca
- Class: Gastropoda
- Subclass: Caenogastropoda
- Order: Neogastropoda
- Family: Volutidae
- Tribe: Livoniini
- Genus: Ericusa; Adams, H.G. & A. Adams, 1858

Species
- See text

= Ericusa =

Genus of gastropods

Ericusa is a small taxonomic genus of medium-sized predatory marine gastropod molluscs in the family Volutidae, the volutes.

== Distribution ==
Ericusa are endemic to Australia. They are found in temperate waters from southern Queensland to southern Western Australia.

== Shell description ==
The shells of Ericusa have a small rounded protoconch, are biconical with a rounded shoulder and have an elongate aperture with 4 distinct columellar plicae and a thickened outer lip. The whorls are regular, smooth and convex. The protoconch is globose and deviates 45° from the axis of the shell. The colour pattern of Ericusa is pink or yellow brown overlaid with a varied brown pattern.

The largest species with shells exceeding 200 mm in length are Ericusa fulgetrum and Ericusa sowerbyi.

== Biology ==
Ericusa are nocturnal and prey on invertebrates. They have a large foot and siphon and they lay relatively large solitary eggs.

== Taxonomy ==
Several infraspecific taxa of Ericusa fulgetra have been named, on the basis of colour patterns of the shell.

== Species ==
- † Ericusa allporti (R. M. Johnston, 1880)
- † Ericusa ancilloides (Tate, 1889)
- † Ericusa atkinsoni (Pritchard, 1896)
- † Ericusa fulgetroides (Pritchard, 1898)
- Ericusa fulgetrum (G.B. Sowerby I, 1825)
- Ericusa hamiltonensis (Pritchard, 1898)
- Ericusa ianmattiskei Hallan, 2023
- † Ericusa macroptera (McCoy, 1866)
- Ericusa naniforma Bail & Limpus, 2013
- † Ericusa ngayawang A. M. Yates, 2022
- Ericusa papillosa (Swainson, 1822)
- Ericusa sericata Thornley, 1951
- Ericusa sowerbyi (Kiener, 1839)
- † Ericusa subtilis (Ludbrook, 1978)
