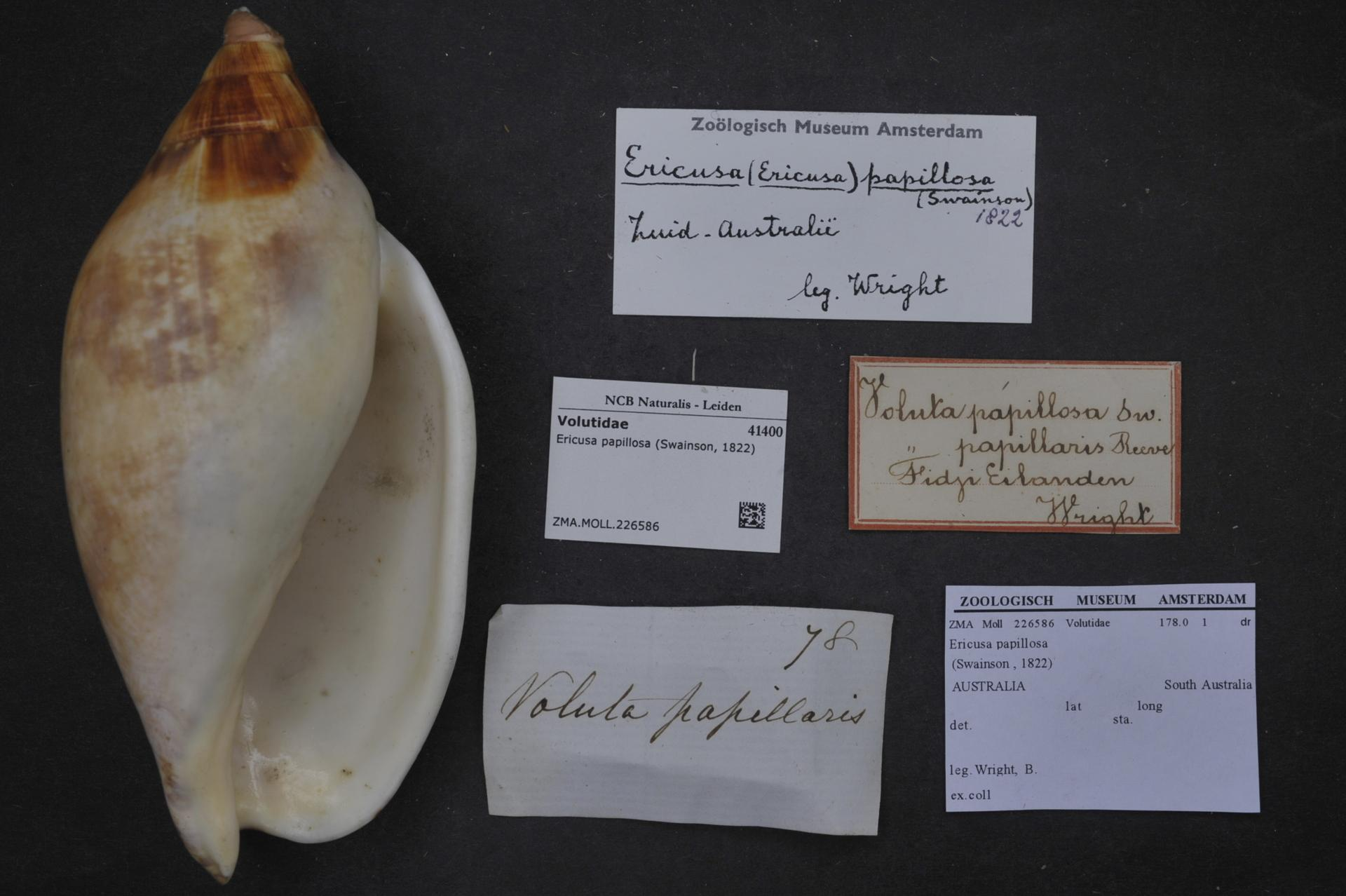

Scientific classification
- Kingdom: Animalia
- Phylum: Mollusca
- Class: Gastropoda
- Subclass: Caenogastropoda
- Order: Neogastropoda
- Family: Volutidae
- Genus: Ericusa
- Species: E. papillosa

Binomial name
- Ericusa papillosa (Swainson, 1822)

Synonyms
- Scaphella papillaris Swainson, 1840; Voluta kenyoniana Brazier, 1898

= Ericusa papillosa =

Species of gastropod

Ericusa papillosa is a species of sea snail, a marine gastropod mollusk in the family Volutidae, the volutes.
