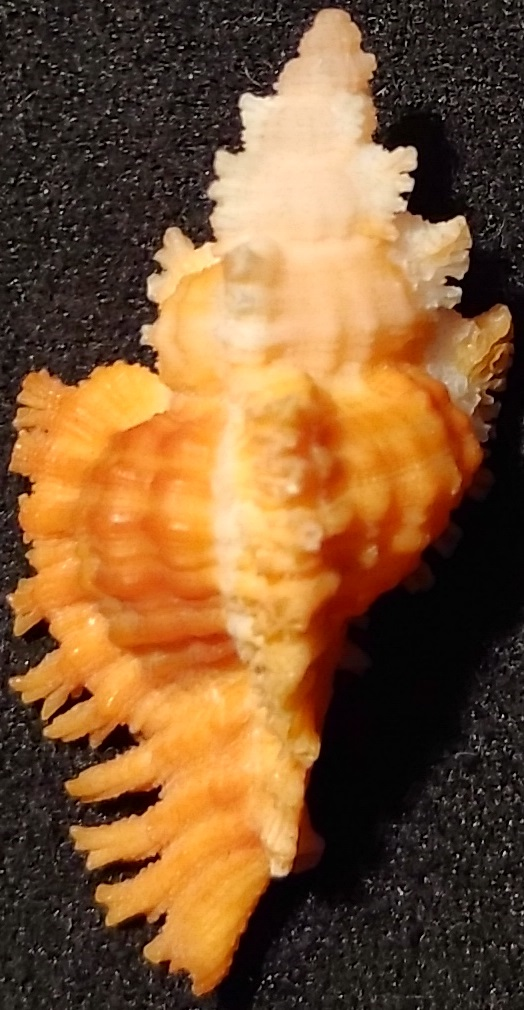

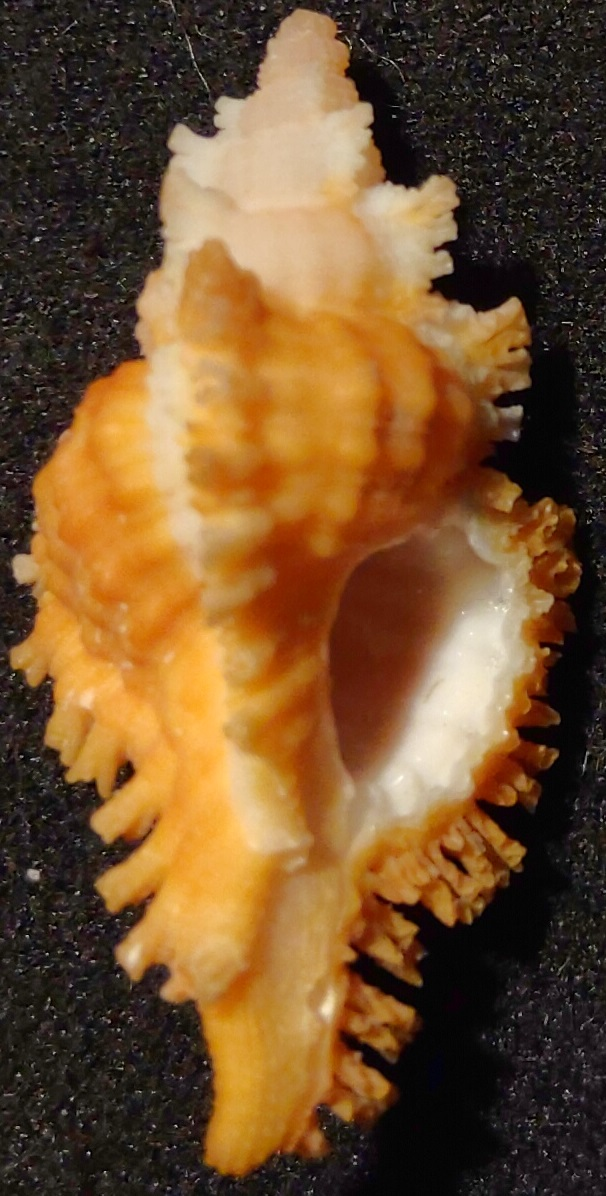

Scientific classification
- Kingdom: Animalia
- Phylum: Mollusca
- Class: Gastropoda
- Subclass: Caenogastropoda
- Order: Neogastropoda
- Family: Muricidae
- Genus: Chicoreus
- Species: C. strigatus

Binomial name
- Chicoreus strigatus (Reeve, 1849)

Synonyms
- Chicoreus (Triplex) strigatus (Reeve, 1849)· accepted, alternate representation; Murex multifrondosus Sowerby, 1879; Murex penchinati Crosse, 1861; Murex strigatus Reeve, 1849

= Chicoreus strigatus =

Species of gastropod

Chicoreus strigatus is a species of sea snail, a marine gastropod mollusk in the family Muricidae, the murex snails or rock snails.
