= Chicoreus rachelcarsonae =

Scientific classification
- Kingdom: Animalia
- Phylum: Mollusca
- Class: Gastropoda
- Subclass: Caenogastropoda
- Order: Neogastropoda
- Family: Muricidae
- Genus: Chicoreus
- Species: C. rachelcarsonae

Binomial name
- Chicoreus rachelcarsonae Petuch, 1987

Synonyms
- Chicoreus rachelcarsonae Petuch, 1987

Species of gastropod

Chicoreus rachelcarsonae is a species of sea snail, a marine gastropod mollusk in the family Muricidae, the murex snails or rock snails.

== Description ==
Original description: "Shell delicate, very frondose, with 3 varices per whorl; one large knob along shoulder between varices; varix with 5 spines; spines often frondose; siphonal canal with 3 large spines; spine on shoulder largest; spire high and elevated; shell color pink or pale salmon-orange overlaid with numerous fine, pale tan spiral threads; spines often darker pinkish red or orange-red; protoconch and early whorls bright orange-red; siphonal canal completely closed."

== Distribution ==
Locus typicus: "(Trawled from) 150 metres depth, 50 kilometres South of Apalachicola, Florida, USA."

== Habitat ==
This rare Gulf of Mexico species lives on coralline algal sea floors.
