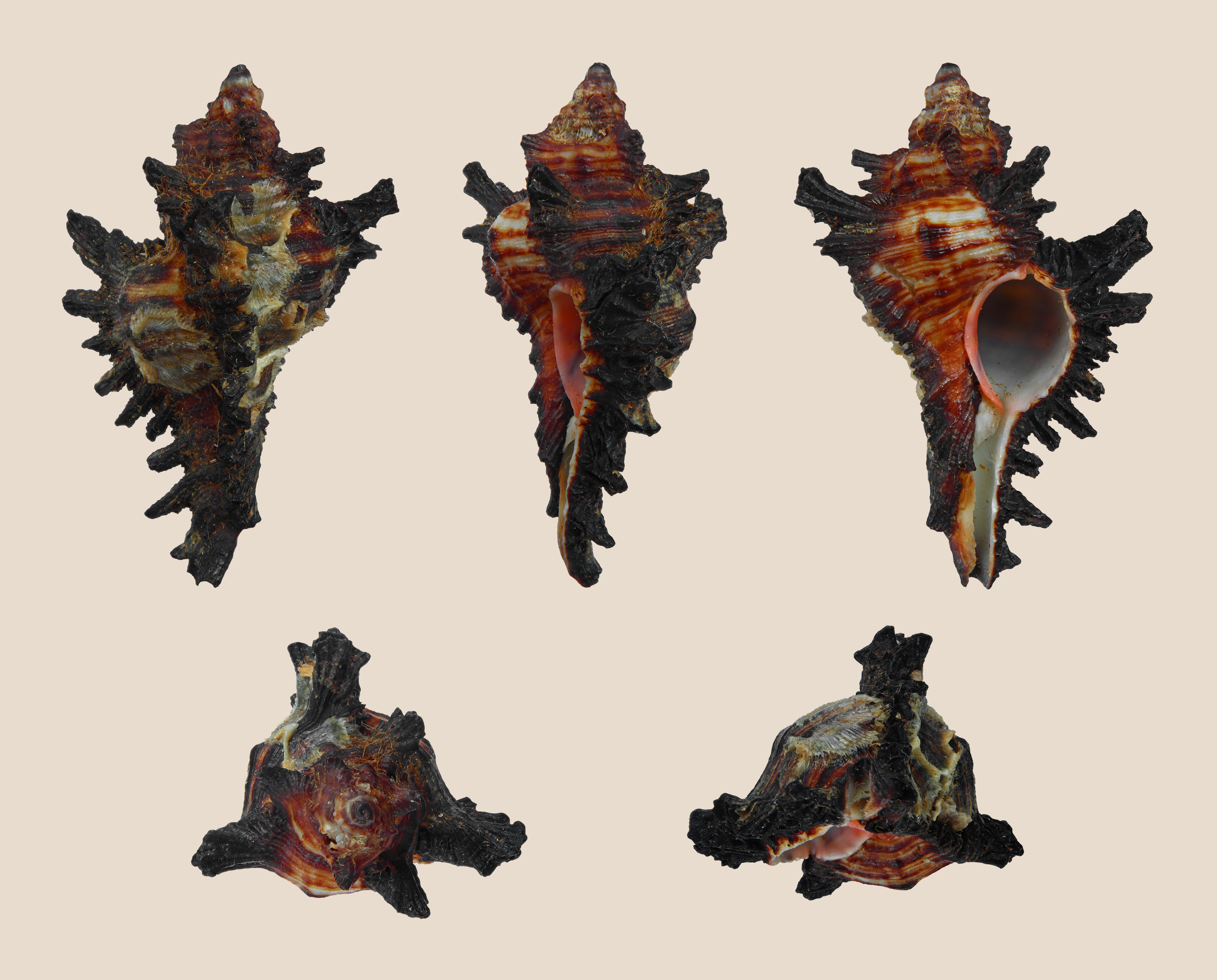
- Five views of a shell of Chicoreus brunneus

Scientific classification
- Kingdom: Animalia
- Phylum: Mollusca
- Class: Gastropoda
- Subclass: Caenogastropoda
- Order: Neogastropoda
- Family: Muricidae
- Genus: Chicoreus
- Species: C. brunneus

Binomial name
- Chicoreus brunneus (Link, 1807)

Synonyms
- Murex adustus Lamarck, 1822; Murex brunneus Link, 1807; Murex despectus A. Adams, 1854; Chicoreus adustus (Lamarck, 1822); Chicoreus brunneus (Link, 1807); Murex australiensis A. Adams, 1854; Murex erithrostomus Dufo, 1840; Murex huttoniae Wright, 1878; Murex oligocanthus Euthyme, 1889; Murex versicolor Gmelin, 1791; Purpura brunneus Link, 1807 (basionym); Purpura scabra sensu Martyn Mørch, 1852; Triplex flavicunda Perry, 1810; Triplex rubicunda Perry, 1810

= Chicoreus brunneus =

Adusta murex

Species of gastropod

Chicoreus brunneus, common name the adusta murex, is a species of predatory sea snail, a marine gastropod mollusk in the family Muricidae, the murex snails.

== Subspecies and formae ==
- Chicoreus (Triplex) brunneus flavicunda (f) (Perry, G., 1810)
- Chicoreus (Triplex) brunneus huttoniae (f) Wright, B., 1878

== Description ==
The adult shell size of this species varies between 25 mm and 115 mm in length.

== Distribution ==
This sea snail is found widely spread in the Indo-West Pacific, and occurs from east Africa to Polynesia, southern Japan, New South Wales and New Caledonia, Australia.
