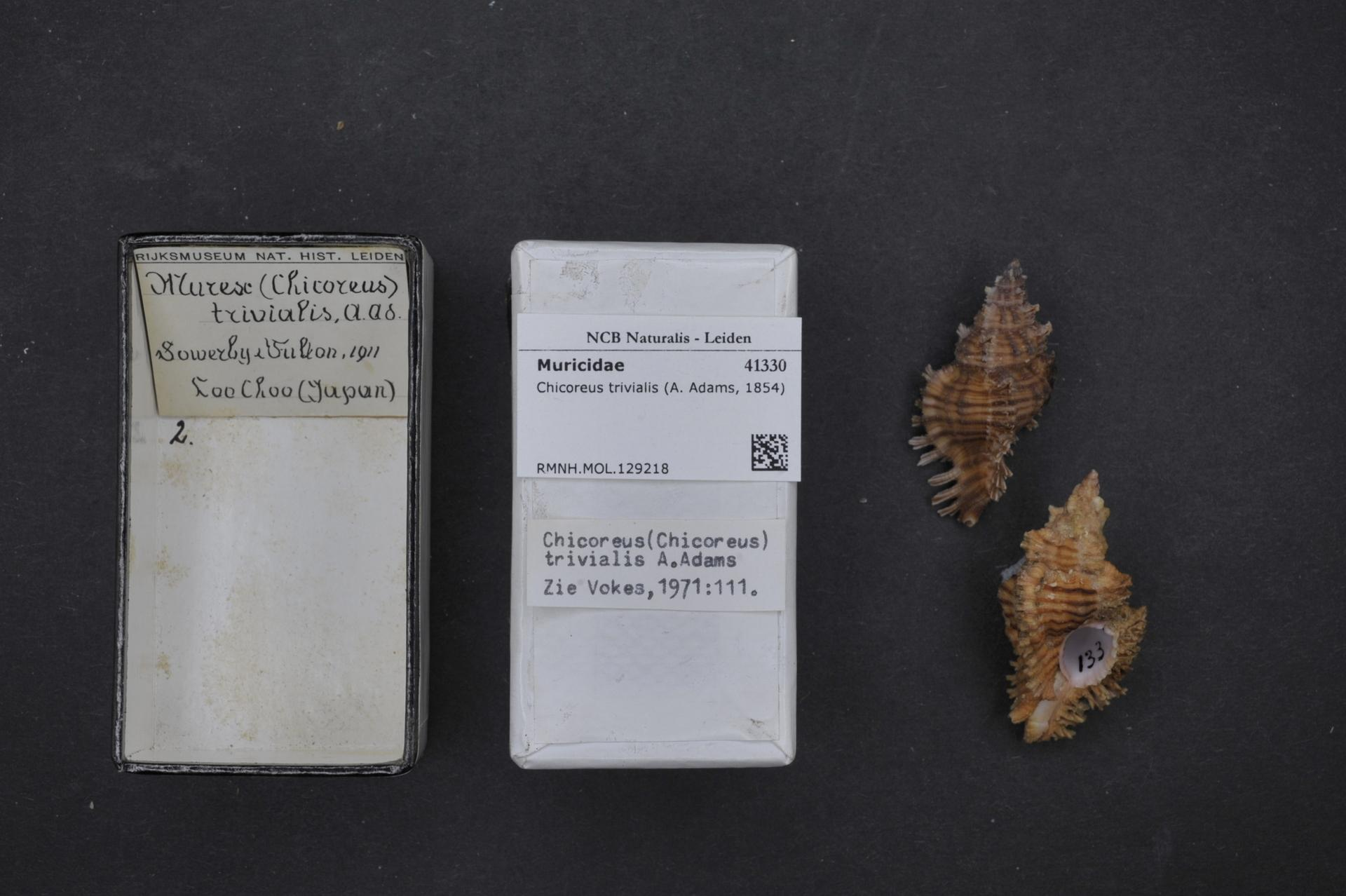
- Chicoreus trivialis shells

Scientific classification
- Kingdom: Animalia
- Phylum: Mollusca
- Class: Gastropoda
- Subclass: Caenogastropoda
- Order: Neogastropoda
- Family: Muricidae
- Genus: Chicoreus
- Species: C. trivialis

Binomial name
- Chicoreus trivialis (A. Adams, 1854)

Synonyms
- Murex trivialis A. Adams, 1854

= Chicoreus trivialis =

Species of gastropod

Chicoreus trivialis is a species of sea snail, a marine gastropod mollusk in the family Muricidae, the murex snails or rock snails.
