= Chicoreus subpalmatus =

Scientific classification
- Kingdom: Animalia
- Phylum: Mollusca
- Class: Gastropoda
- Subclass: Caenogastropoda
- Order: Neogastropoda
- Family: Muricidae
- Genus: Chicoreus
- Species: C. subpalmatus

Binomial name
- Chicoreus subpalmatus Houart, 1988

Synonyms
- Chicoreus (Triplex) subpalmatus Houart, 1988

Species of gastropod

Chicoreus subpalmatus is a species of sea snail, a marine gastropod mollusk in the family Muricidae, the murex snails or rock snails.

== Description ==
Shell size 25-30 mm.

== Distribution ==
This rare deep-water marine species occurs off New Caledonia.
