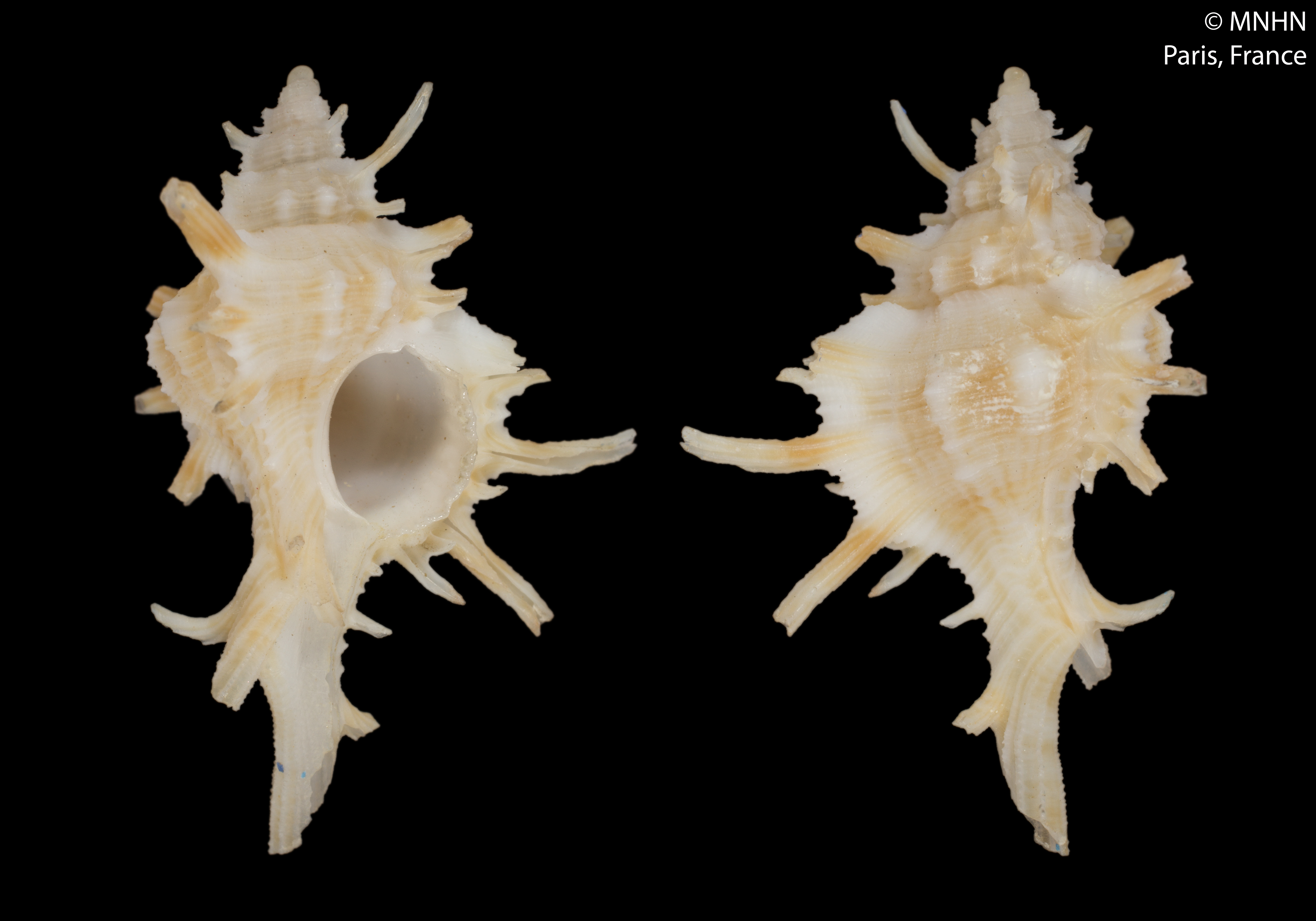
- Shell of Chicoreus boucheti (holotype at MNHN, Paris)

Scientific classification
- Kingdom: Animalia
- Phylum: Mollusca
- Class: Gastropoda
- Subclass: Caenogastropoda
- Order: Neogastropoda
- Family: Muricidae
- Genus: Chicoreus
- Species: C. boucheti

Binomial name
- Chicoreus boucheti Houart, 1983

Synonyms
- Chicoreus (Chicoreus) boucheti Houart, 1983a; Chicoreus (Triplex) boucheti Houart, 1983· accepted, alternate representation

= Chicoreus boucheti =

Species of gastropod

Chicoreus boucheti is a species of sea snail, a marine gastropod mollusk in the family Muricidae, the murex snails or rock snails.

== Description ==
Size 2–4 cm.

== Distribution ==
This marine species occurs off New Caledonia
