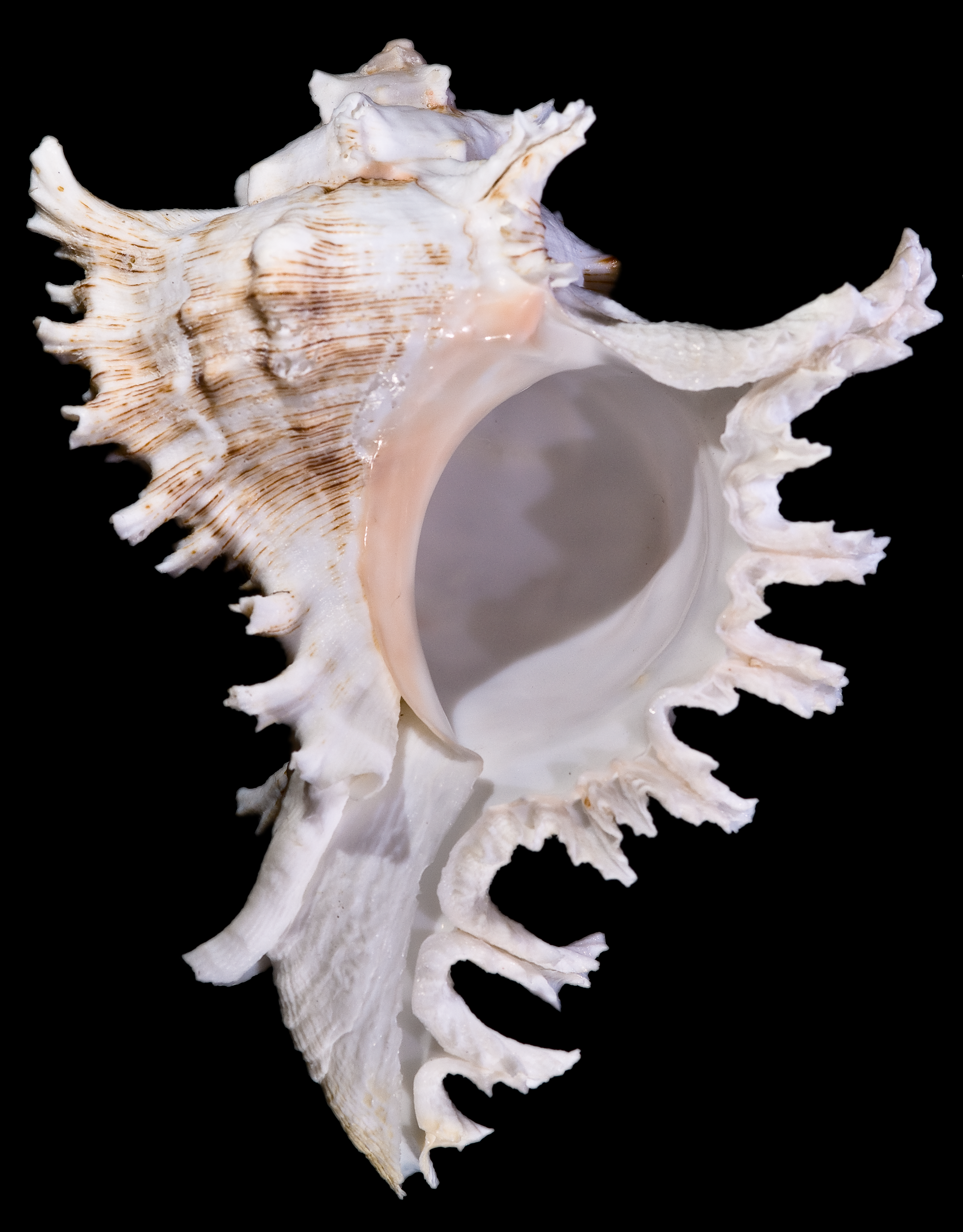
- Ventral view of a shell of Chicoreus ramosus

Scientific classification
- Kingdom: Animalia
- Phylum: Mollusca
- Class: Gastropoda
- Subclass: Caenogastropoda
- Order: Neogastropoda
- Superfamily: Muricoidea
- Family: Muricidae
- Subfamily: Muricinae
- Genus: Chicoreus; Montfort, 1810

Type species
- Murex ramosus (Linnaeus, 1758)

Synonyms
- Chicoreus (Chicopinnatus) Houart, 1992; Chicoreus (Chicoreus) Montfort, 1810; Chicoreus (Rhizophorimurex) Oyama, 1950; Chicoreus (Triplex) Perry, 1810; Euphyllon Jousseaume, 1880; Foveomurex Wenz, 1941; Frondosaria Schlüter, 1838; Murex (Chicoreus) Montfort, 1810; Pirtus de Gregorio, 1885; Torvamurex Macpherson & Gabriel, 1962; Torvamurex Iredale, 1936 (invalid, no description); Triplex Perry, 1810

= Chicoreus =

Genus of gastropods

Chicoreus is a genus of medium- to large-sized predatory sea snails. These are carnivorous marine gastropod molluscs in the family Muricidae, the murexes or rock snails.

== Species ==
Over 100 species are within the genus, with several subgenera, including:

- Chicoreus aculeatus (Lamarck, 1822)
- Chicoreus akritos Radwin & D'Attilio, 1976
- Chicoreus allaryi Houart, Quiquandon & Briano, 2004
- Chicoreus androyensis Damarco & Briano, 2020
- Chicoreus anosyensis Bozzetti, 2013
- Chicoreus aquilus Houart, Moe & C. Chen, 2017
- Chicoreus arbaguil Houart, 2015
- Chicoreus asianus Kuroda, 1942
- Chicoreus austramosus Vokes, 1978
- Chicoreus axicornis (Lamarck, 1822)
- Chicoreus banksii (Sowerby II, 1841)
- Chicoreus boucheti Houart, 1983
- Chicoreus bourguignati (Poirier, 1883)
- Chicoreus brevifrons (Lamarck, 1822)
- Chicoreus brianbaileyi (Mühlhäusser, 1984)
- Chicoreus brunneus (Link, 1807)
- Chicoreus bullisi Vokes, 1974
- Chicoreus bundharmai Houart, 1992
- Chicoreus capucinus Lamarck, 1822
- Chicoreus cervicornis (Lamarck, 1822)
- Chicoreus cloveri (Houart, 1985)
- Chicoreus cnissodus (Euthyme, 1889)
- Chicoreus cornucervi (Röding, 1798)
- Chicoreus corrugatus Sowerby II, 1841
- Chicoreus cosmani Abbott & Finlay, 1979
- Chicoreus crosnieri Houart, 1985
- Chicoreus damicornis (Hedley, 1903)
- Chicoreus denudatus (Perry, 1811)
- Chicoreus dharmai Houart, 2015
- Chicoreus dodongi Houart, 1995
- Chicoreus dovi Houart, 1984
- Chicoreus dunni Petuch, 1987
- Chicoreus duyenae Thach, 2016
- Chicoreus elisae Bozzetti, 1991
- Chicoreus exuberans Cossignani, 2004
- Chicoreus felicitatis Bozzetti, 2011
- Chicoreus florifer (Reeve, 1846)
- Chicoreus fosterorum Houart, 1989
- Chicoreus franchii Cossignani, 2005
- Chicoreus franzettiae Houart, 2019
- Chicoreus giadae Cossignani, 2016
- Chicoreus groschi Vokes, 1978
- Chicoreus guillei Houart, 1985
- Chicoreus ingridmariae Houart, 2010
- Chicoreus insularum (Pilsbry, 1921)
- Chicoreus janae Houart, 2013
- Chicoreus jessicae Houart, 2008
- Chicoreus kahlbrocki Houart & Lorenz, 2020
- Chicoreus kaitomoei Houart, Moe & C. Chen, 2017
- Chicoreus kantori Houart & Héros, 2013
- Chicoreus laqueatus (Sowerby II, 1841)
- † Chicoreus lawsi (P. A. Maxwell, 1971)
- Chicoreus leali Thach, 2016
- Chicoreus litos Vokes, 1978
- Chicoreus loebbeckei (Kobelt, 1879)
- Chicoreus longicornis (Dunker, 1864)
- Chicoreus lorenzi Houart, 2009
- Chicoreus maurus (Broderip, 1833)
- Chicoreus mergus Vokes, 1974
- Chicoreus microphyllus (Lamarck, 1816)
- Chicoreus miyokoae (Kosuge, 1979)
- Chicoreus mocki Beals, 1997
- Chicoreus monicae Bozzetti, 2001
- Chicoreus nobilis Shikama, 1977
- Chicoreus orchidiflorus Shikama, 1973
- Chicoreus paini Houart, 1983
- Chicoreus palmarosae (Lamarck, 1822)
- Chicoreus paucifrondosus Houart, 1988
- Chicoreus peledi Vokes, 1978
- Chicoreus pisori Houart, 2007
- Chicoreus rachelcarsonae Petuch, 1987
- Chicoreus ramosus (Linnaeus, 1758)
- Chicoreus roberti Bozzetti, 2015
- Chicoreus rossiteri (Crosse, 1872)
- Chicoreus rubescens (Broderip, 1833)
- Chicoreus ryosukei Shikama, 1978
- Chicoreus ryukyuensis Shikama, 1978
- Chicoreus saulii (Sowerby II, 1841)
- Chicoreus setionoi Houart, 2001
- Chicoreus solangeae Bozzetti, 2014
- Chicoreus spectrum (Reeve, 1846)
- Chicoreus strigatus (Reeve, 1849)
- Chicoreus subpalmatus Houart, 1988
- Chicoreus territus (Reeve, 1845)
- Chicoreus teva Houart & Lorenz, 2016
- Chicoreus thomasi (Crosse, 1872)
- Chicoreus torrefactus (Sowerby II, 1841)
- Chicoreus trivialis (A. Adams, 1854)
- Chicoreus varius (G.B. Sowerby II, 1834)
- Chicoreus virgineus (Röding, 1798)
- Chicoreus woelflingi T. Cossignani, 2024
- †Chicoreus xestos (E. Vokes, 1974)
- Chicoreus zululandensis Houart, 1989

Synonymized species

- Chicoreus adustus Lamarck, 1822 : synonym of Chicoreus (Triplex) brunneus (Link, 1807)
- Chicoreus akritos Radwin & D'Attilio, 1976 : synonym of Chicoreus (Triplex) microphyllus (Lamarck, 1816)
- Chicoreus clausii (Dunker, 1879) : synonym of Hexaplex (Trunculariopsis) varius clausii (Dunker, 1879)
- Chicoreus cloveri Houart, 1985: represented as Chicoreus (Triplex) cloveri Houart, 1985
- Chicoreus gubbi (Reeve, 1849) : synonym of Chicocenebra gubbi (Reeve, 1849)
- Chicoreus guionneti Merle, Garrigues & Pointier, 2002 : synonym of Siratus guionneti (Merle, Garrigues & Pointier, 2001)
- Chicoreus inflatus (Lamarck, 1822) : synonym of Chicoreus (Chicoreus) ramosus
- Chicoreus perelegans Vokes, 1965 : synonym of Siratus perelegans (Vokes, 1965)
- Chicoreus subtilis Houart, 1977 : synonym of Chicoreus (Chicopinnatus) orchidiflorus (Shikama, 1973)
- Chicoreus superbus (Sowerby, 1889) : synonym of Chicomurex superbus (Sowerby, 1889)

Subgenus Chicoreus (Phyllonotus) Swainson, 1833

In 2011, Phyllonotus was raised to the status of genus from its former state as subgenus of Chicoreus.

- Chicoreus erythrostomus (Swainson, 1831): synonym of Hexaplex erythrostomus (Swainson, 1831)
- Chicoreus regius (Swainson, 1821): synLamarckonym of Hexaplex regius (Swainson, 1821)
