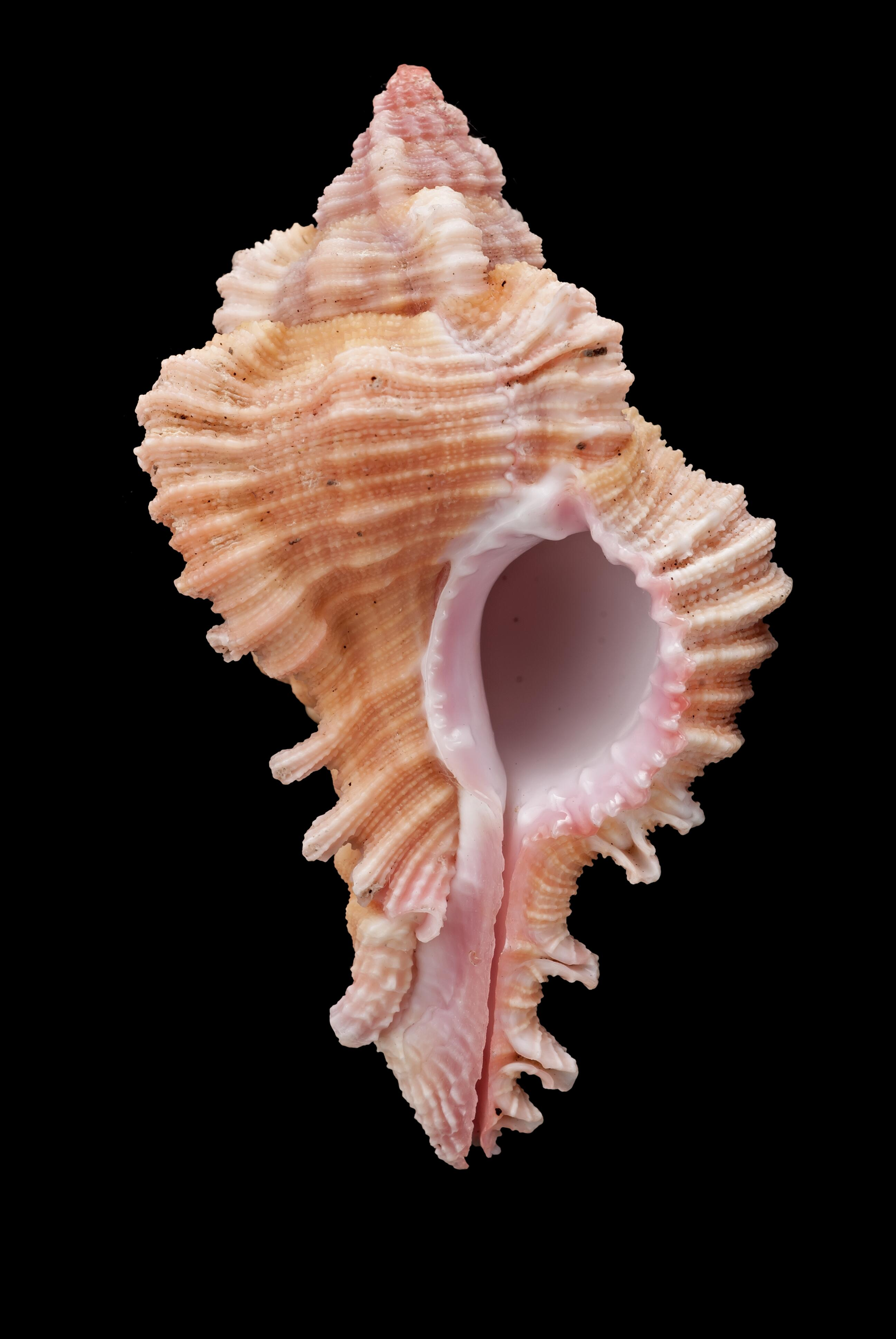
- Shell of Chicoreus thomasi in the collection of Amgueddfa Cymru – Museum Wales

Scientific classification
- Kingdom: Animalia
- Phylum: Mollusca
- Class: Gastropoda
- Subclass: Caenogastropoda
- Order: Neogastropoda
- Family: Muricidae
- Genus: Chicoreus
- Species: C. thomasi

Binomial name
- Chicoreus thomasi (Crosse, 1872)

Synonyms
- Murex thomasi Crosse, 1872b

= Chicoreus thomasi =

Species of gastropod

Chicoreus thomasi is a species of sea snail, a marine gastropod mollusk in the family Muricidae, the murex snails or rock snails.
