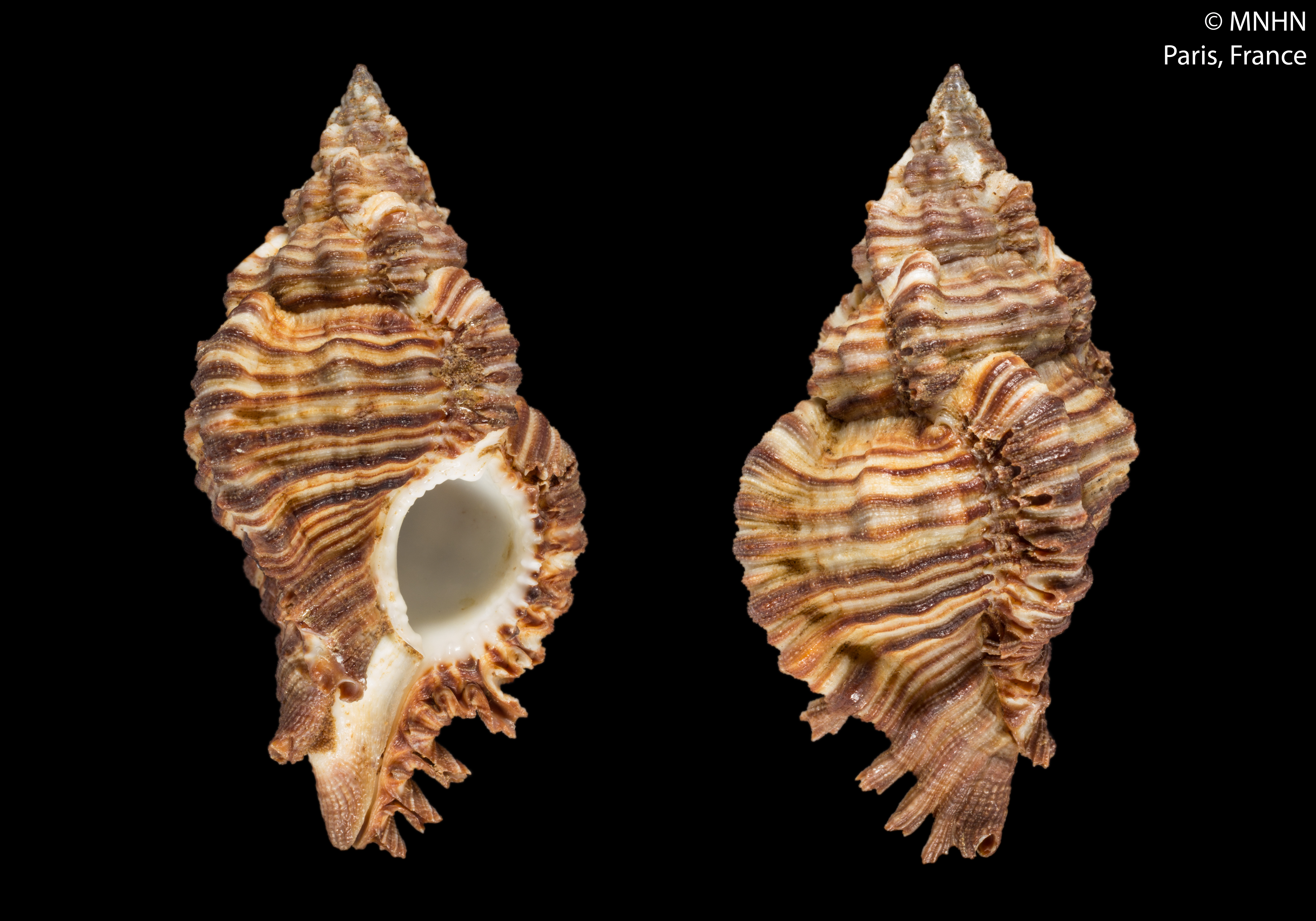
- Shell of Chicoreus microphyllus (paralectotype at MNHN, Paris)

Scientific classification
- Kingdom: Animalia
- Phylum: Mollusca
- Class: Gastropoda
- Subclass: Caenogastropoda
- Order: Neogastropoda
- Family: Muricidae
- Genus: Chicoreus
- Species: C. microphyllus

Binomial name
- Chicoreus microphyllus (Lamarck, 1816)

Synonyms
- Chicoreus akritos Radwin & D'Attilio, 1976; Chicoreus (Triplex) akritos Radwin, G.E. & A. d' Attilio, 1976; Chicoreus (Triplex) microphyllus (Lamarck, 1816); Murex jousseaumei Poirier, 1883; Murex microphyllus Lamarck, 1816; Murex poirieri Jousseaume, 1881

= Chicoreus microphyllus =

Species of gastropod

Chicoreus microphyllus, common name the curly murex, is a species of sea snail, a marine gastropod mollusk in the family Muricidae, the murex snails or rock snails.

== Description ==
The size of an adult shell varies between 35 mm and 124 mm.

== Distribution ==
This species is widespread through the Indo-West Pacific region.
