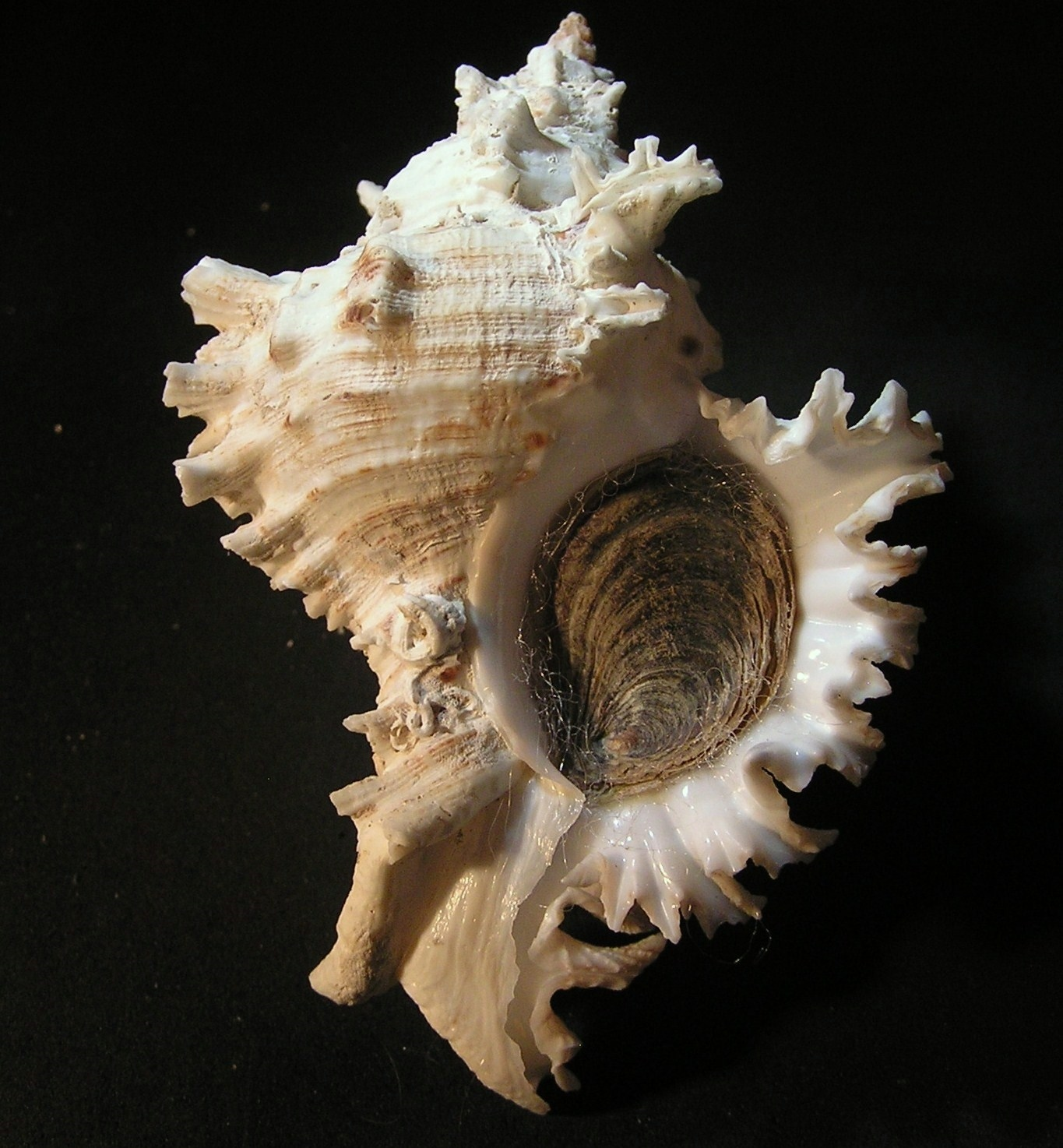
- Apertural view of Chicoreus bundharmai

Scientific classification
- Kingdom: Animalia
- Phylum: Mollusca
- Class: Gastropoda
- Subclass: Caenogastropoda
- Order: Neogastropoda
- Family: Muricidae
- Genus: Chicoreus
- Species: C. bundharmai

Binomial name
- Chicoreus bundharmai Houart, 1992

Synonyms
- Chicoreus (Chicoreus) bundharmai Houart, 1992

= Chicoreus bundharmai =

Species of gastropod

Chicoreus bundharmai, also known as Bundharma's Murex, is a species of predatory sea snail, a marine gastropod mollusk in the family Muricidae, the murex snails or rock snails.

== Description ==
The size of an adult shell varies between 50mm and 140mm. First and second teleoconch whorls have 10 axial ribs. The shell is light brown with darker spinal cords, and brown peripheral band at adapical part of whorls. Aperture (mollusc) whitish with pink rim.

== Distribution ==
This marine species occurs off Kalimantan, Indonesia and in the East Sea off Vietnam.
