= Chicoreus dunni =

Scientific classification
- Kingdom: Animalia
- Phylum: Mollusca
- Class: Gastropoda
- Subclass: Caenogastropoda
- Order: Neogastropoda
- Family: Muricidae
- Genus: Chicoreus
- Species: C. dunni

Binomial name
- Chicoreus dunni Petuch, 1987

Synonyms
- Chicoreus dunni Petuch, 1987

Species of gastropod

Chicoreus dunni is a species of sea snail, a marine gastropod mollusk in the family Muricidae, the murex snails or rock snails.

== Description ==
Original description: "Shell small for genus, slender, elongated, with elevated spire and long siphonal canal; body whorl with 3 varices; intervarical regions with 1 large rounded knob, varices with 6 highly fimbriated, long, slender, recurved spines; siphonal varices with 3 very elongated, slender, recurved, needle-like spines; body whorl with 6 highly fimbriated spiral cords; aperture large, oval; shell color uniformly very dark blackish-brown; edge of parietal shield orange; interior of aperture brown; spines of siphonal canal always longer than spines on varices."

== Distribution ==
Locus typicus: "South-Eastern end of Eleuthera Island, Bahamas."
