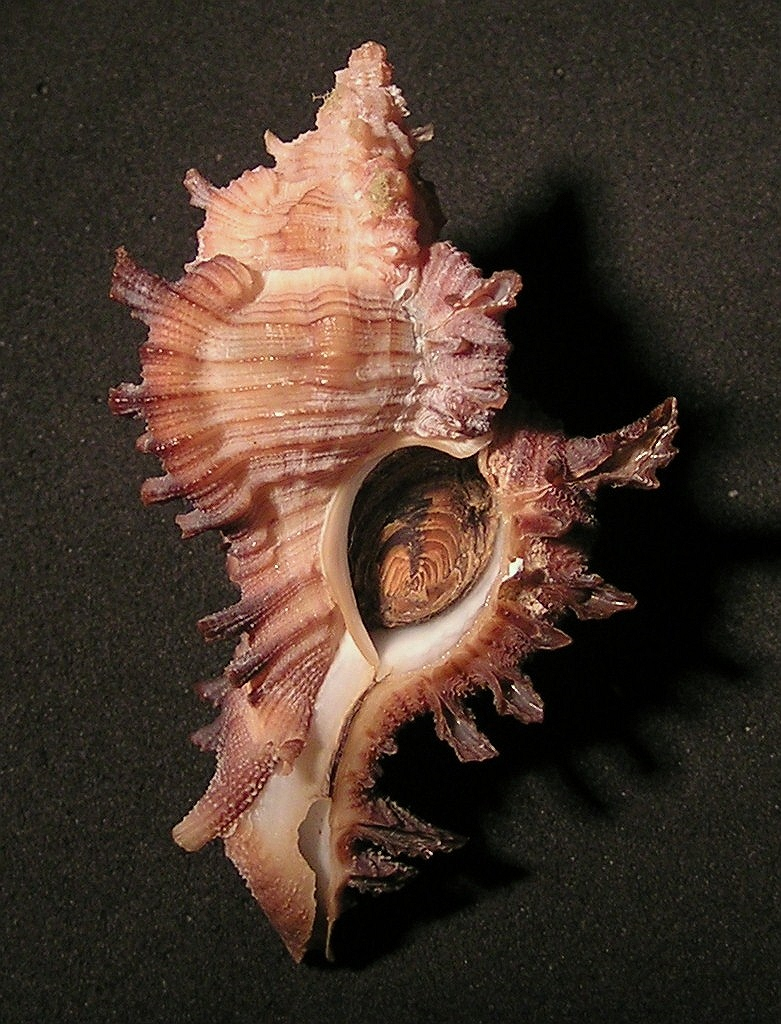
- Apertural view of Chicoreus mergus

Scientific classification
- Kingdom: Animalia
- Phylum: Mollusca
- Class: Gastropoda
- Subclass: Caenogastropoda
- Order: Neogastropoda
- Family: Muricidae
- Genus: Chicoreus
- Species: C. mergus

Binomial name
- Chicoreus mergus Vokes, 1974

Synonyms
- Chicoreus (Triplex) mergus Vokes, 1974

= Chicoreus mergus =

Species of gastropod

Chicoreus mergus, common name the diver murex, is a species of sea snail, a marine gastropod mollusk in the family Muricidae, the murex snails or rock snails.

== Description ==
The size of an adult shell varies between 24 mm and 70 mm.

== Distribution ==
This species occurs in the Caribbean Sea and the Gulf of Mexico.
