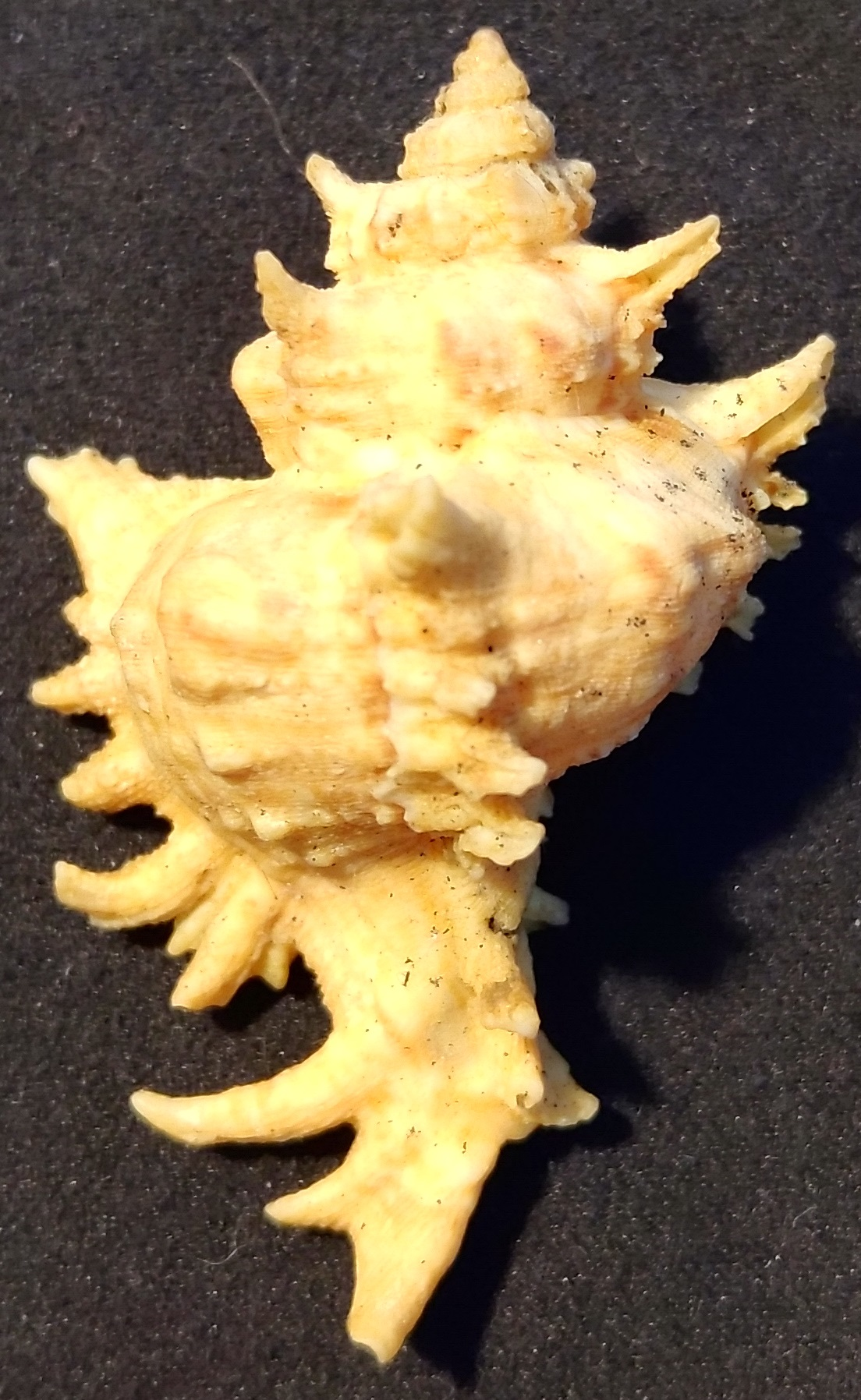

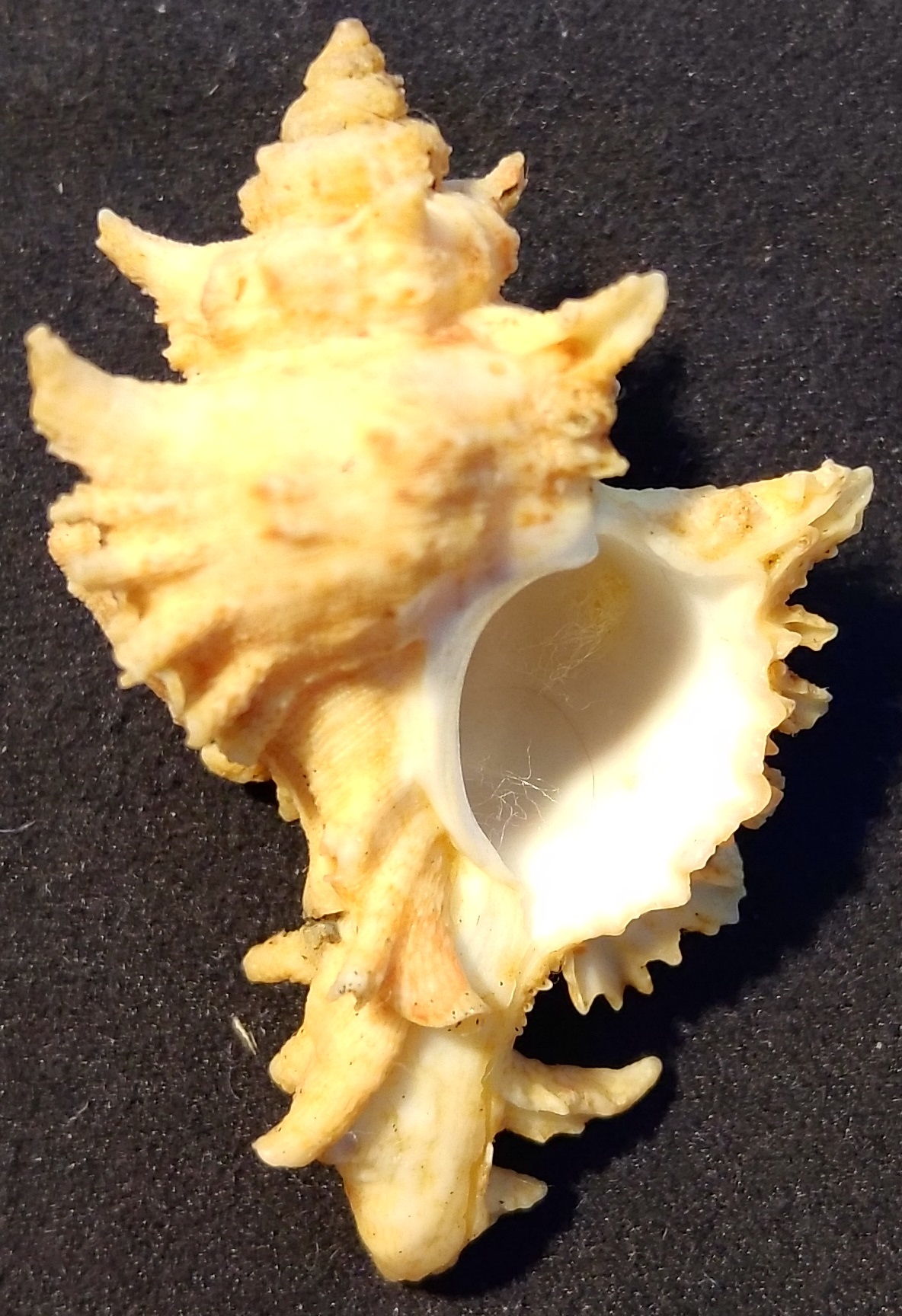

Scientific classification
- Kingdom: Animalia
- Phylum: Mollusca
- Class: Gastropoda
- Subclass: Caenogastropoda
- Order: Neogastropoda
- Family: Muricidae
- Genus: Chicoreus
- Species: C. austramosus

Binomial name
- Chicoreus austramosus Vokes, 1978

= Chicoreus austramosus =

Species of gastropod

Chicoreus austramosus is a species of sea snail, a marine gastropod mollusk in the family Muricidae, the murex snails or rock snails.

== Description ==
Size 4–6 cm

== Distribution ==
Durban, Rep. South Africa
