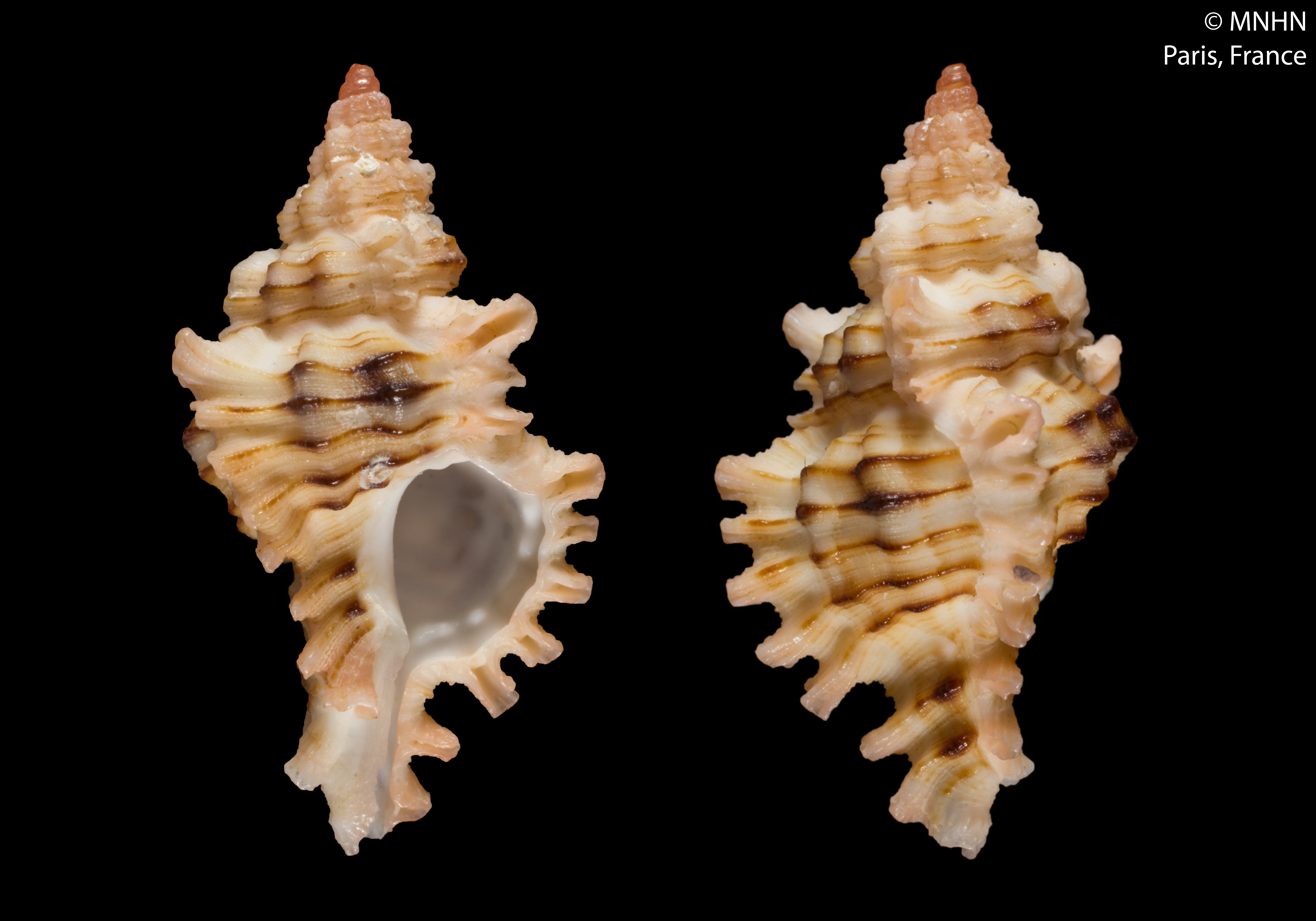
- Image of Chicoreus dodongi

Scientific classification
- Kingdom: Animalia
- Phylum: Mollusca
- Class: Gastropoda
- Subclass: Caenogastropoda
- Order: Neogastropoda
- Family: Muricidae
- Genus: Chicoreus
- Species: C. dodongi

Binomial name
- Chicoreus dodongi Houart, 1995

Synonyms
- Chicoreus (Triplex) dodongi Houart, 1995· accepted, alternate representation

= Chicoreus dodongi =

Species of gastropod

Chicoreus dodongi is a species of sea snail, a marine gastropod mollusk in the family Muricidae, the murex snails or rock snails.

== Distribution ==
This marine species occurs off the Philippines.
