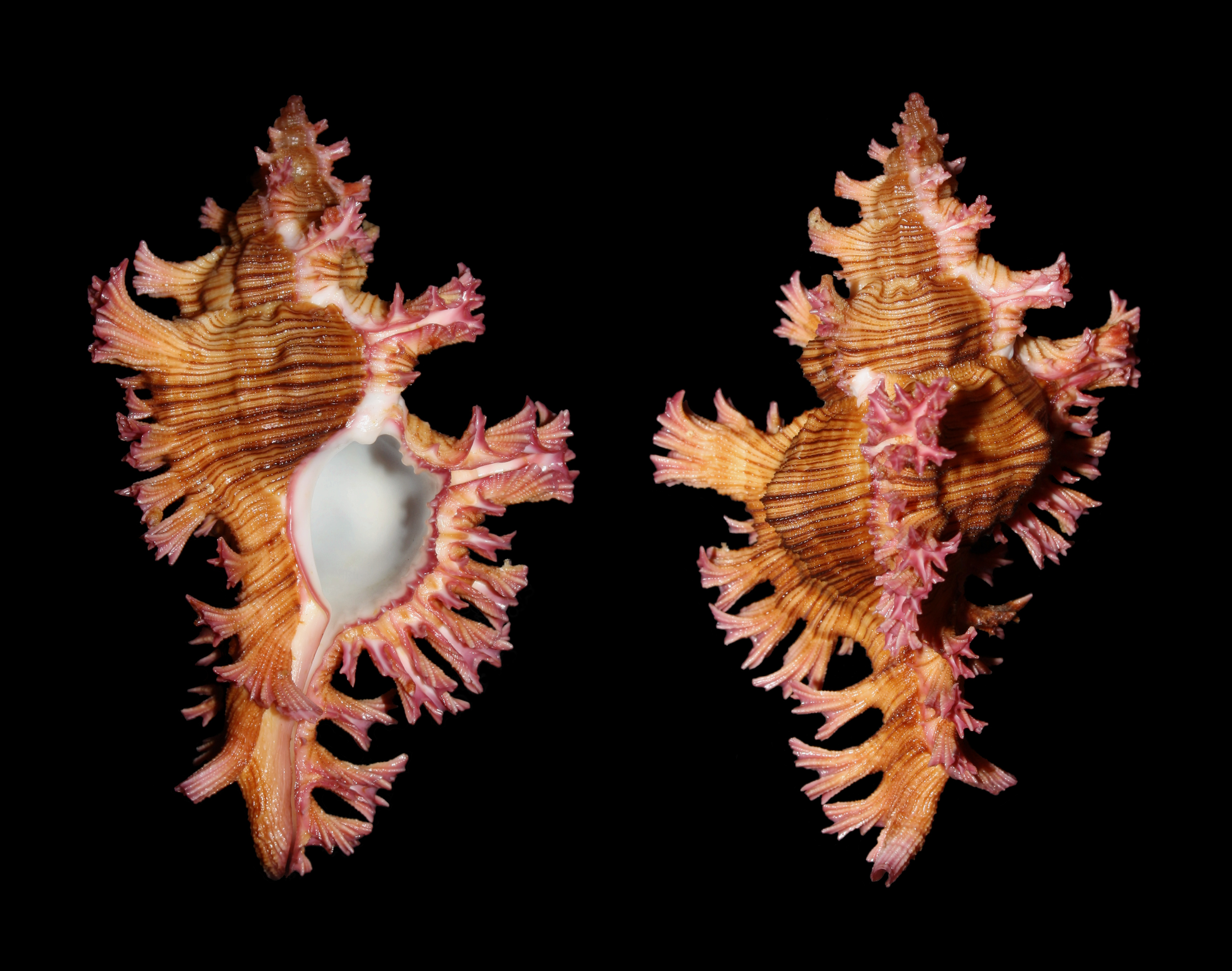
- A shell of Chicoreus saulii

Scientific classification
- Kingdom: Animalia
- Phylum: Mollusca
- Class: Gastropoda
- Subclass: Caenogastropoda
- Order: Neogastropoda
- Family: Muricidae
- Genus: Chicoreus
- Species: C. saulii

Binomial name
- Chicoreus saulii (Sowerby II, 1841)

Synonyms
- Chicoreus saulii (Sowerby, 1841); Murex saulii Sowerby, 1841

= Chicoreus saulii =

Species of gastropod

Chicoreus saulii is a species of sea snail, a marine gastropod mollusk in the family Muricidae, the murex snails or rock snails.

== Description ==
The shell size varies between 60 mm and 142 mm.

== Distribution ==
This species is distributed in the Indian Ocean along the Mascarene Basin; in the Pacific Ocean along Japan and Papua New Guinea
