= Chicoreus cloveri =

Scientific classification
- Kingdom: Animalia
- Phylum: Mollusca
- Class: Gastropoda
- Subclass: Caenogastropoda
- Order: Neogastropoda
- Family: Muricidae
- Genus: Chicoreus
- Species: C. cloveri

Binomial name
- Chicoreus cloveri Houart, 1985

Synonyms
- Chicoreus (Chicoreus) cloveri Houart, 1985; Chicoreus (Triplex) cloveri Houart, 1985· accepted, alternate representation

Species of gastropod

Chicoreus cloveri is a species of sea snail, a marine gastropod mollusk in the family Muricidae, the murex snails or rock snails.

== Distribution ==
This marine species occurs in the Indian Ocean off Mauritius.
