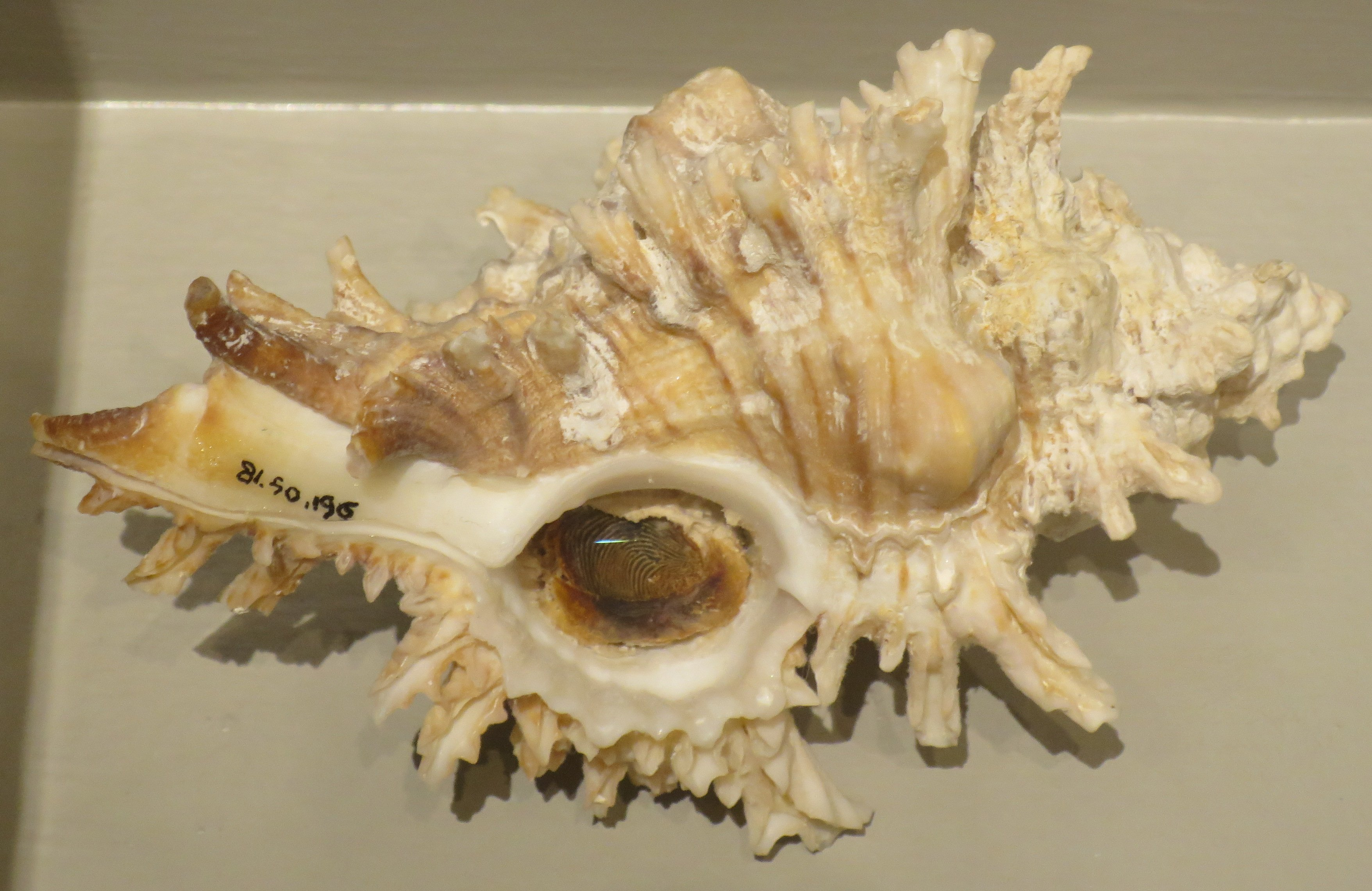
- Chicoreus insularum shell

Scientific classification
- Kingdom: Animalia
- Phylum: Mollusca
- Class: Gastropoda
- Subclass: Caenogastropoda
- Order: Neogastropoda
- Family: Muricidae
- Genus: Chicoreus
- Species: C. insularum

Binomial name
- Chicoreus insularum (Pilsbry, 1921)

Synonyms
- Murex torrefactus var. insularum Pilsbry, 1921

= Chicoreus insularum =

Species of gastropod

Chicoreus insularum is a species of sea snail, a marine gastropod mollusk in the family Muricidae, the murex snails or rock snails.
