= Chicoreus paini =

Scientific classification
- Kingdom: Animalia
- Phylum: Mollusca
- Class: Gastropoda
- Subclass: Caenogastropoda
- Order: Neogastropoda
- Family: Muricidae
- Genus: Chicoreus
- Species: C. paini

Binomial name
- Chicoreus paini Houart, 1983

Synonyms
- Chicoreus kengaluae Muhlhausser & Alf, 1983; Chicoreus paini Houart, 1983; Chicoreus (Chicoreus) paini Houart, 1983 (basionym); Chicoreus (Triplex) paini Houart, 1983· accepted, alternate representation

Species of gastropod

Chicoreus paini is a species of sea snail, a marine gastropod mollusk in the family Muricidae, the murex snails or rock snails.

== Distribution ==
This marine species occurs off the Solomon Islands
