= Chicoreus groschi =

Scientific classification
- Kingdom: Animalia
- Phylum: Mollusca
- Class: Gastropoda
- Subclass: Caenogastropoda
- Order: Neogastropoda
- Family: Muricidae
- Genus: Chicoreus
- Species: C. groschi

Binomial name
- Chicoreus groschi Vokes, 1978

Synonyms
- Chicoreus groschi Vokes, 1978

Species of gastropod

Chicoreus groschi is a species of sea snail, a marine gastropod mollusk in the family Muricidae, the murex snails or rock snails.
