= Chicoreus brianbaileyi =

Scientific classification
- Kingdom: Animalia
- Phylum: Mollusca
- Class: Gastropoda
- Subclass: Caenogastropoda
- Order: Neogastropoda
- Family: Muricidae
- Genus: Chicoreus
- Species: C. brianbaileyi

Binomial name
- Chicoreus brianbaileyi (Mühlhäusser, 1984)

Synonyms
- Chicoreus (Chicopinnatus) brianbaileyi (Mühlhäusser, 1984)· accepted, alternate representation; Pterynotus (Pterynotus) brianbaileyi Mühlhäusser, 1984; Pterynotus brianbaileyi Mühlhäusser, 1984 (original combination)

Species of gastropod

Chicoreus brianbaileyi is a species of sea snail, a marine gastropod mollusk in the family Muricidae, the murex snails or rock snails.

== Distribution ==
C. brianbaileyi can be found in the waters surrounding the Solomon Islands.
