= Chicoreus rubescens =

Scientific classification
- Kingdom: Animalia
- Phylum: Mollusca
- Class: Gastropoda
- Subclass: Caenogastropoda
- Order: Neogastropoda
- Family: Muricidae
- Genus: Chicoreus
- Species: C. rubescens

Binomial name
- Chicoreus rubescens (Broderip, 1833)

Synonyms
- Murex rubescens Broderip, 1833

Species of gastropod

Chicoreus rubescens is a species of sea snail, a marine gastropod mollusk in the family Muricidae, the murex snails or rock snails.
