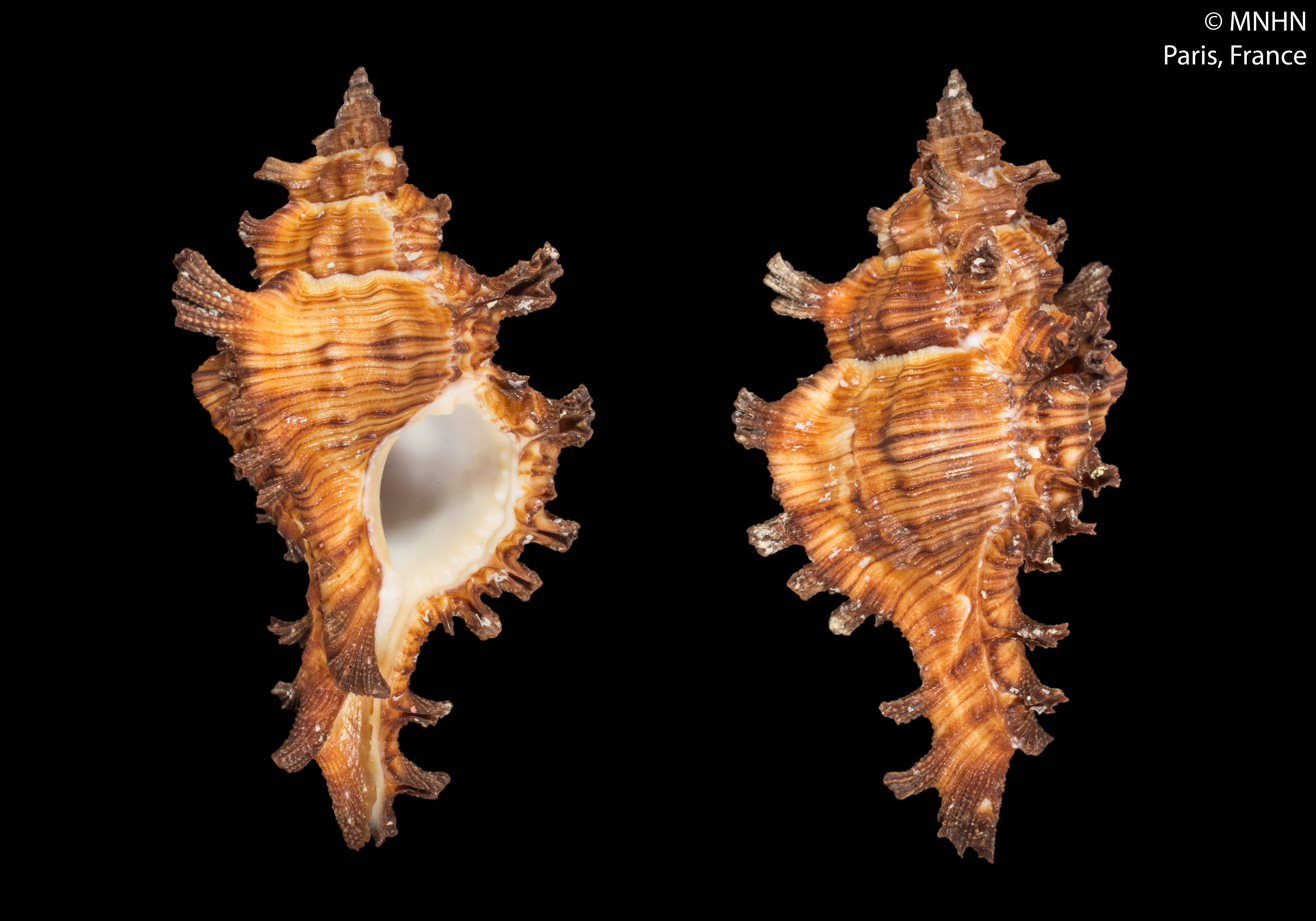
- Shell of Chicoreus jessicae (holotype at MNHN, Paris)

Scientific classification
- Kingdom: Animalia
- Phylum: Mollusca
- Class: Gastropoda
- Subclass: Caenogastropoda
- Order: Neogastropoda
- Family: Muricidae
- Genus: Chicoreus
- Species: C. jessicae

Binomial name
- Chicoreus jessicae Houart, 2008

Synonyms
- Chicoreus (Triplex) jessicae Houart, 2008

= Chicoreus jessicae =

Species of gastropod

Chicoreus jessicae is a species of sea snail, a marine gastropod mollusk in the family Muricidae, the murex snails or rock snails.

== Description ==
Shell size 60-65 mm.

== Distribution ==
This marine species occurs off the Philippines.
