= Chicoreus crosnieri =

Scientific classification
- Kingdom: Animalia
- Phylum: Mollusca
- Class: Gastropoda
- Subclass: Caenogastropoda
- Order: Neogastropoda
- Family: Muricidae
- Genus: Chicoreus
- Species: C. crosnieri

Binomial name
- Chicoreus crosnieri Houart, 1985

Synonyms
- Chicoreus (Chicoreus) crosnieri Houart, 1985; Chicoreus (Triplex) crosnieri Houart, 1985· accepted, alternate representation

Species of gastropod

Chicoreus crosnieri is a species of sea snail, a marine gastropod mollusk in the family Muricidae, the murex snails or rock snails.

== Distribution ==
This marine species occurs off Madagascar.
