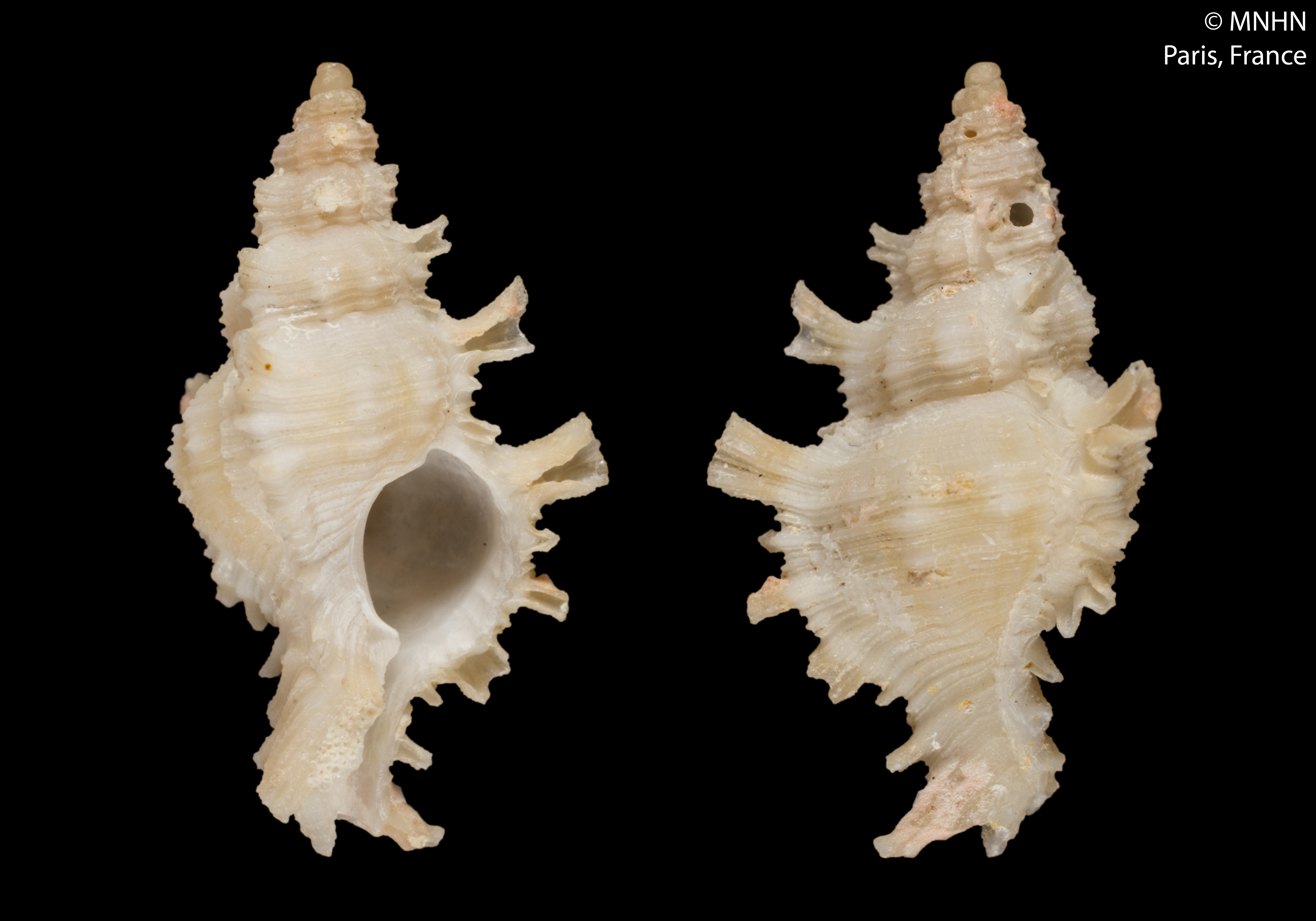
- Shell of Chicoreus paucifrondosus (paratype at MNHN? Paris)

Scientific classification
- Kingdom: Animalia
- Phylum: Mollusca
- Class: Gastropoda
- Subclass: Caenogastropoda
- Order: Neogastropoda
- Family: Muricidae
- Genus: Chicoreus
- Species: C. paucifrondosus

Binomial name
- Chicoreus paucifrondosus Houart, 1988

Synonyms
- Chicoreus (Triplex) paucifrondosus Houart, 1988

= Chicoreus paucifrondosus =

Species of gastropod

Chicoreus paucifrondosus is a species of sea snail, a marine gastropod mollusk in the family Muricidae, the murex snails or rock snails.

== Distribution ==
This marine species occurs off New Caledonia.
