= Chicoreus cervicornis =

- Shells of C. cervicornis

Scientific classification
- Kingdom: Animalia
- Phylum: Mollusca
- Class: Gastropoda
- Subclass: Caenogastropoda
- Order: Neogastropoda
- Family: Muricidae
- Genus: Chicoreus
- Species: C. cervicornis

Binomial name
- Chicoreus cervicornis (Lamarck, 1822)

Synonyms
- Chicoreus (Triplex) cervicornis (Lamarck, 1822)· accepted, alternate representation; Murex cervicornis Lamarck, 1822

Species of gastropod

The two-forked murex (Chicoreus cervicornis) also known as the deer antler murex is a species of sea snail, a marine gastropod mollusk in the family Muricidae, the murex snails or rock snails.

== Description ==
The shell sizes this species ranges from 4–7 cm (40-75mm).

== Distribution ==
The marine species occurs off North Australia and West New Guinea.
