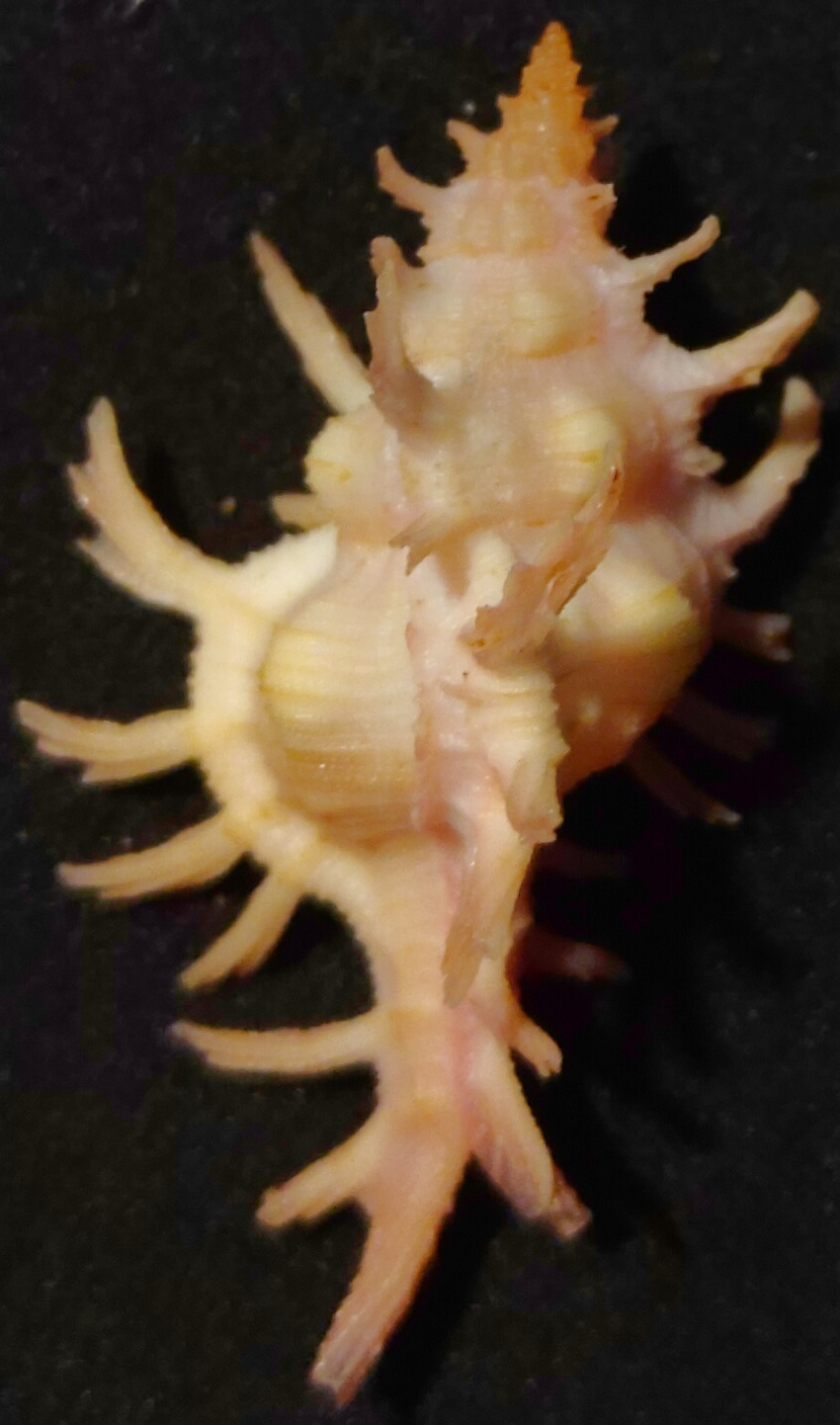

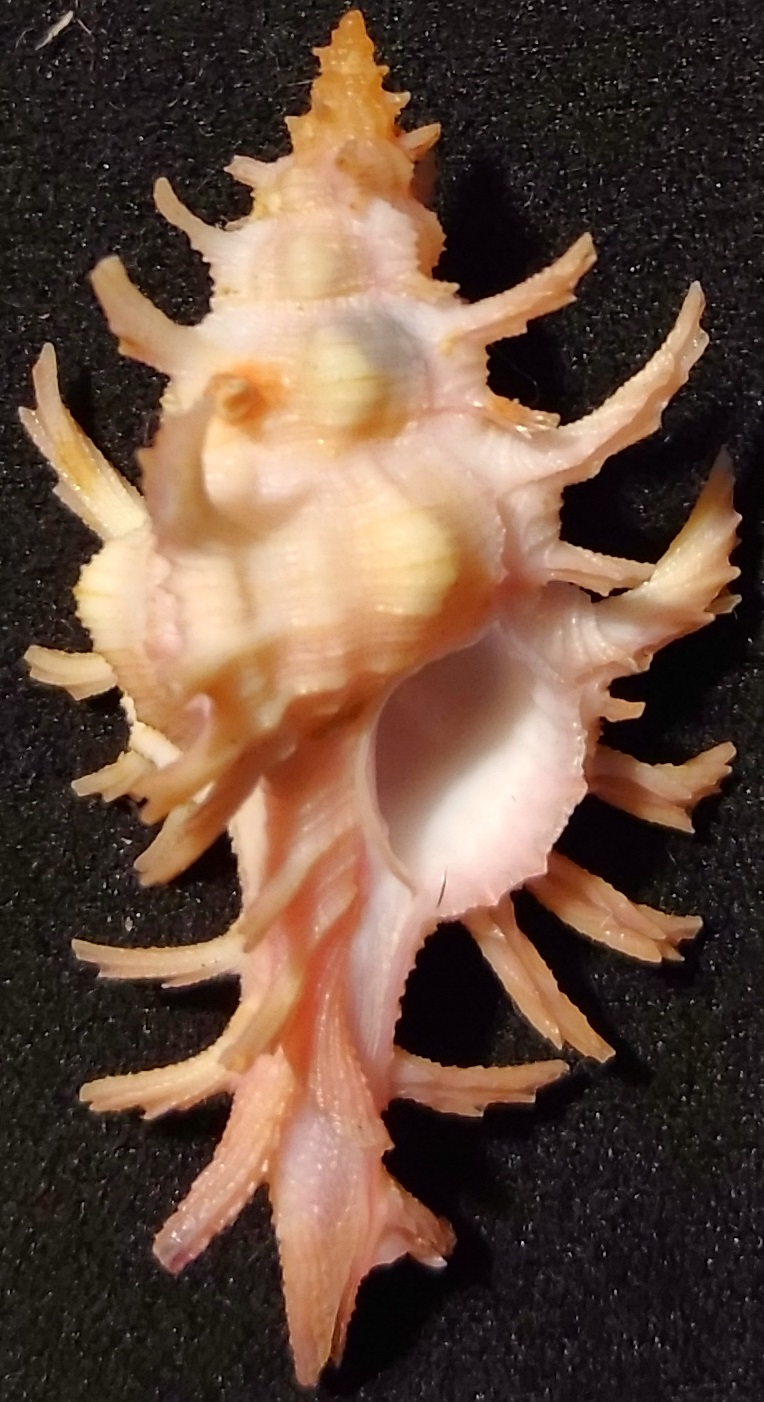

Scientific classification
- Kingdom: Animalia
- Phylum: Mollusca
- Class: Gastropoda
- Subclass: Caenogastropoda
- Order: Neogastropoda
- Family: Muricidae
- Genus: Chicoreus
- Species: C. rossiteri

Binomial name
- Chicoreus rossiteri (Crosse, 1872)

Synonyms
- Chicoreus (Triplex) rossiteri (Crosse, 1872)· accepted, alternate representation; Chicoreus saltatrix Kuroda, 1964 Murex rossiteri Crosse, 1872; Murex rossiteri Crosse, 1872 (original combination)

= Chicoreus rossiteri =

Species of gastropod

Chicoreus rossiteri is a species of sea snail, a marine gastropod mollusk in the family Muricidae, the murex snails or rock snails.

== Description ==
The length of the shell attains 46.6 mm.

== Distribution ==
This marine species occurs off New Caledonia.
