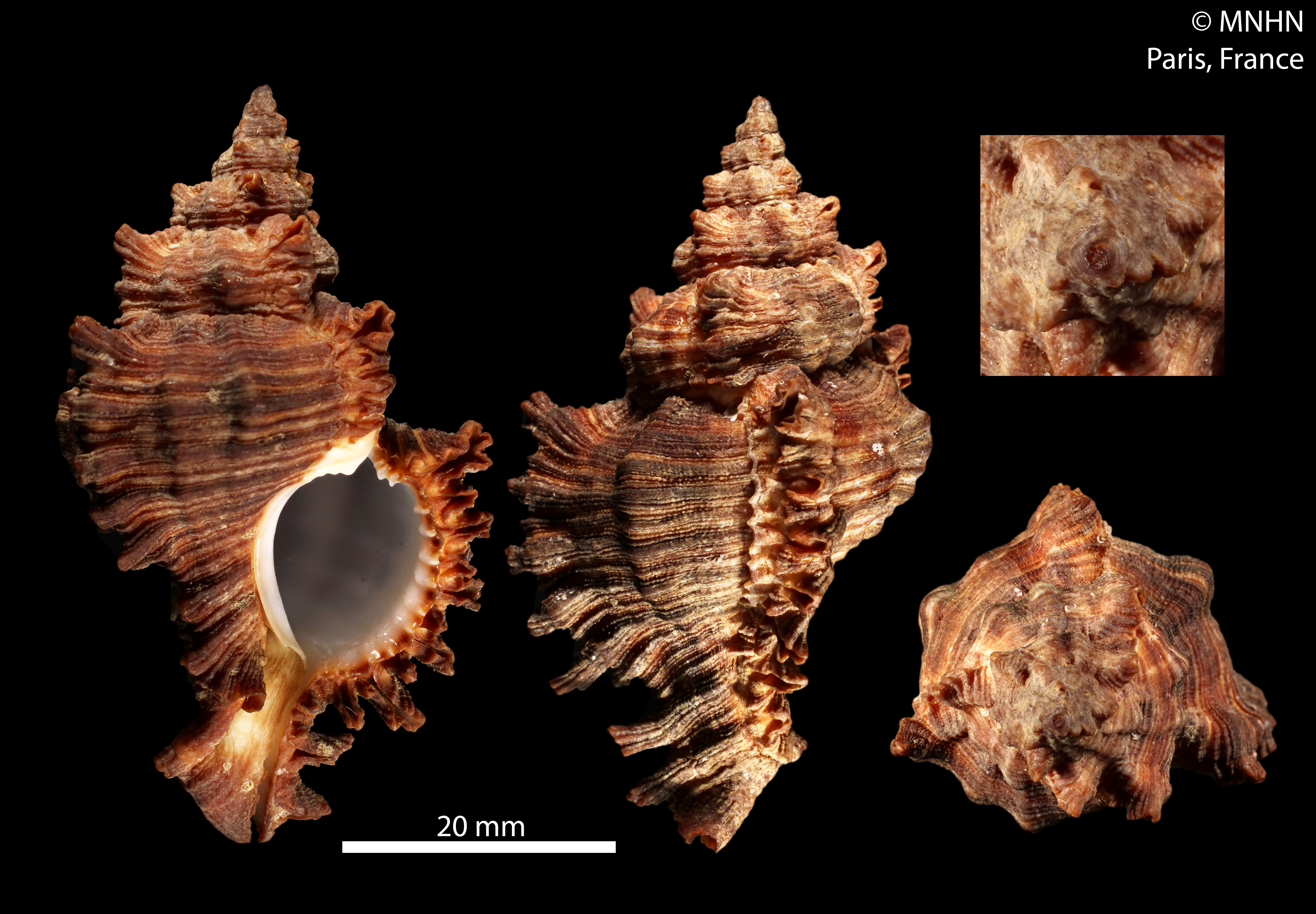
- Shell of Chicoreus dovi (paratype at MNHN, Paris]

Scientific classification
- Kingdom: Animalia
- Phylum: Mollusca
- Class: Gastropoda
- Subclass: Caenogastropoda
- Order: Neogastropoda
- Family: Muricidae
- Genus: Chicoreus
- Species: C. dovi

Binomial name
- Chicoreus dovi Houart, 1984

Synonyms
- Chicoreus (Triplex) dovi Houart, 1984

= Chicoreus dovi =

Species of gastropod

Chicoreus dovi is a species of sea snail, a marine gastropod mollusk in the family Muricidae, the murex snails or rock snails.

== Distribution ==
This marine species occurs off Kenya.
