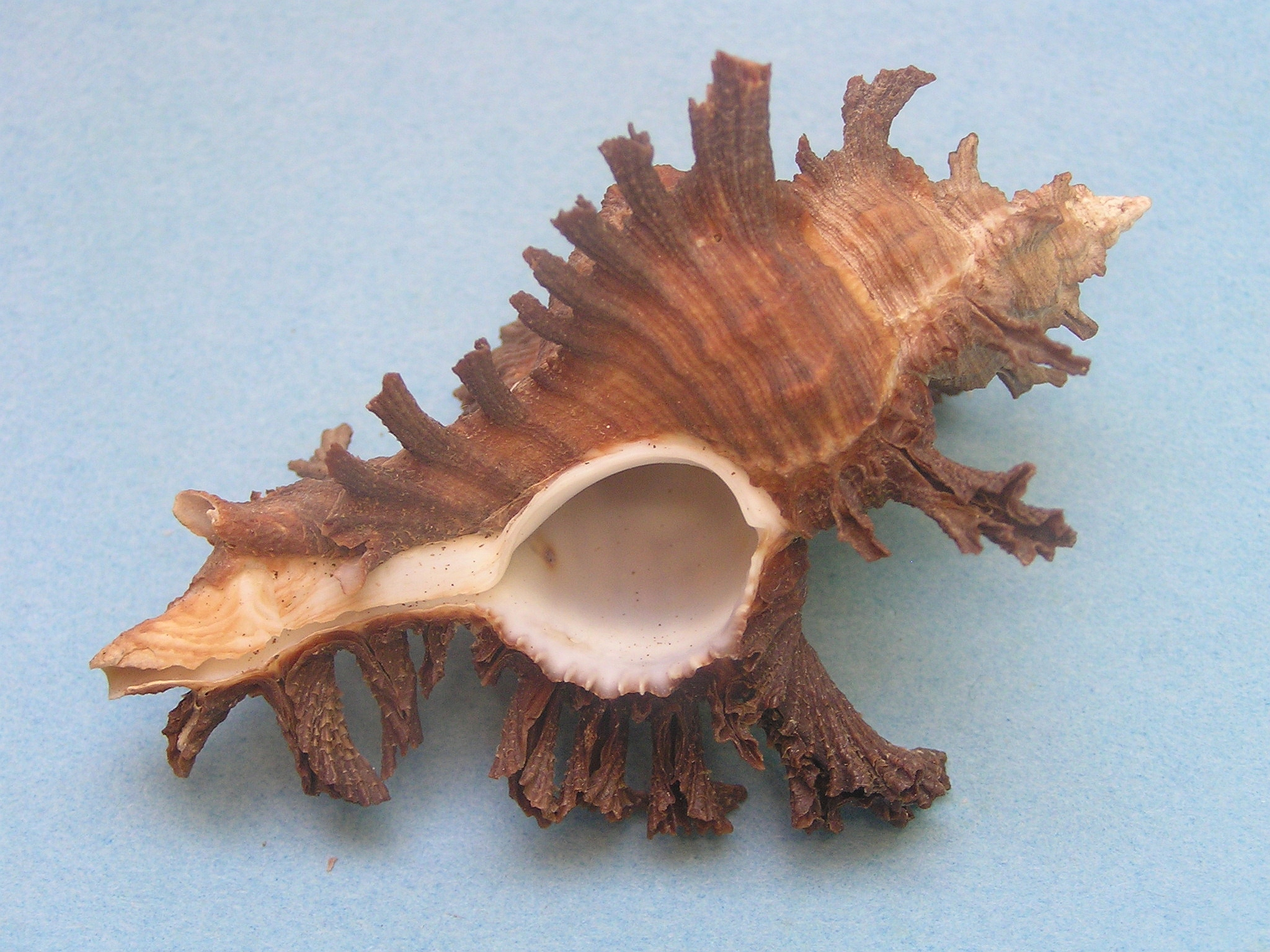
- Apertural view of Chicoreus banksii

Scientific classification
- Kingdom: Animalia
- Phylum: Mollusca
- Class: Gastropoda
- Subclass: Caenogastropoda
- Order: Neogastropoda
- Family: Muricidae
- Genus: Chicoreus
- Species: C. banksii

Binomial name
- Chicoreus banksii (Sowerby G.B. II, 1841)

Synonyms
- Chicoreus (Triplex) banksii (G.B. Sowerby II, 1841); Murex banksii Sowerby, 1841 (basionym); Murex crocatus Reeve, 1845

= Chicoreus banksii =

Species of gastropod

Chicoreus banksii, common name the Banks' murex, is a species of sea snail, a marine gastropod mollusk in the family Muricidae, the murex snails or rock snails.

== Description ==
The size of an adult shell varies between 55 mm and 107 mm. It is very similar in physical appearance to Chicoreus palmarosae, the Rose Branch Murex.

== Distribution ==
This species occurs in the Pacific Ocean along the Philippines, the Solomons, New Caledonia and Australia.
