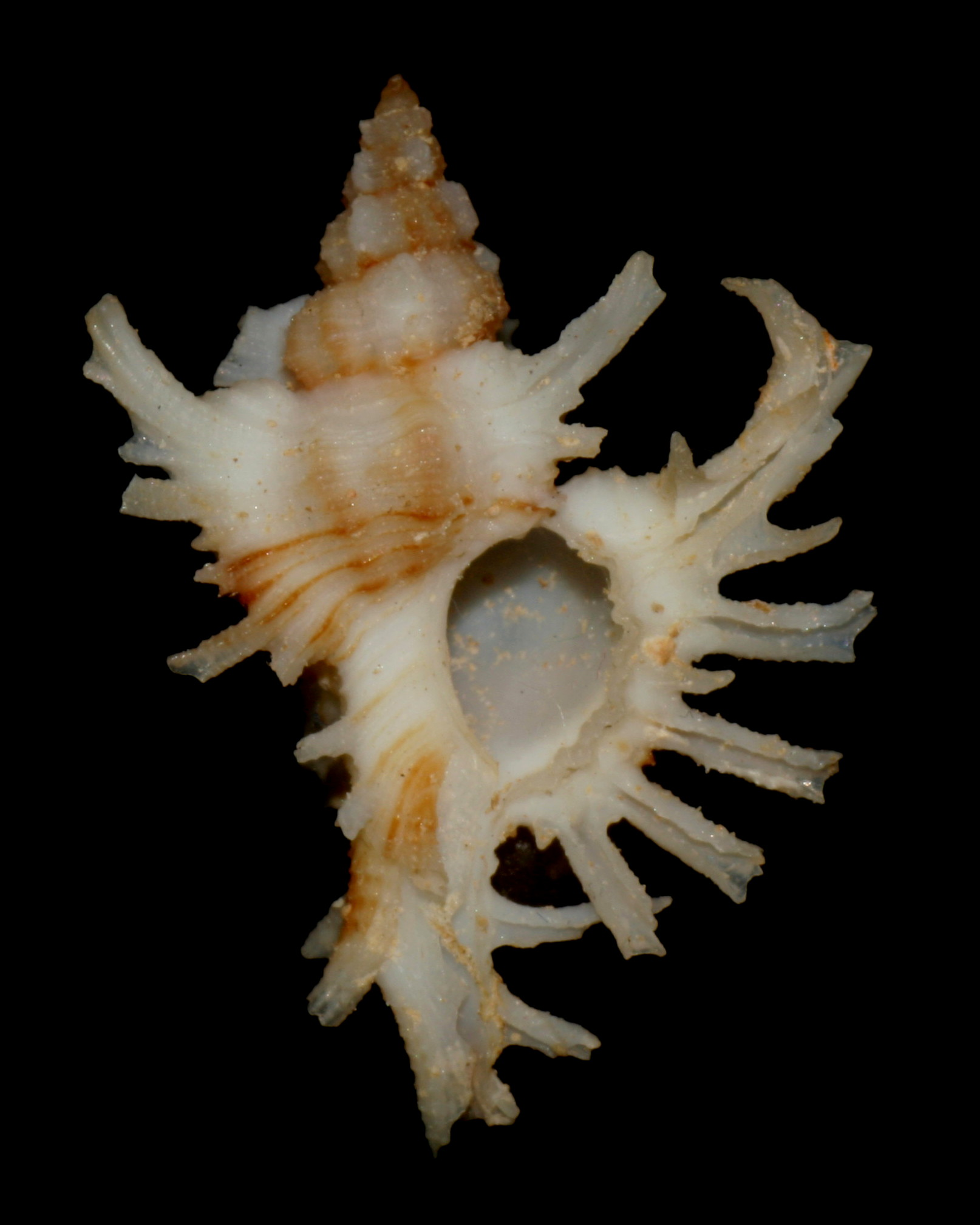
- Shell of Chicoreus cnissodus, with operculum, measuring 65.8 mm in height, trawled at 200 m off Ueno, in Japan.

Scientific classification
- Kingdom: Animalia
- Phylum: Mollusca
- Class: Gastropoda
- Subclass: Caenogastropoda
- Order: Neogastropoda
- Family: Muricidae
- Genus: Chicoreus
- Species: C. cnissodus

Binomial name
- Chicoreus cnissodus (Euthyme, 1889)

Synonyms
- Chicoreus (Triplex) cnissodus (Euthyme, 1889)· accepted, alternate representation; Chicoreus (Triplex) cnissodus ceylonensis Houart, 2015· accepted, alternate representation; Chicoreus (Triplex) cnissodus cnissodus (Euthyme, 1889)· accepted, alternate representation; Chicoreus cnissodus ceylonensis Houart, 2015· accepted, alternate representation; Chicoreus cnissodus cnissodus (Euthyme, 1889)· accepted, alternate representation; Murex cnissodus Euthyme, 1889; Murex minor Euthyme, 1889

= Chicoreus cnissodus =

Species of gastropod

Chicoreus cnissodus, also known as the smelly murex, is a species of sea snail, a marine gastropod mollusk in the family Muricidae, the murex snails or rock snails.

== Distribution ==
This marine species occurs off Sri Lanka.
