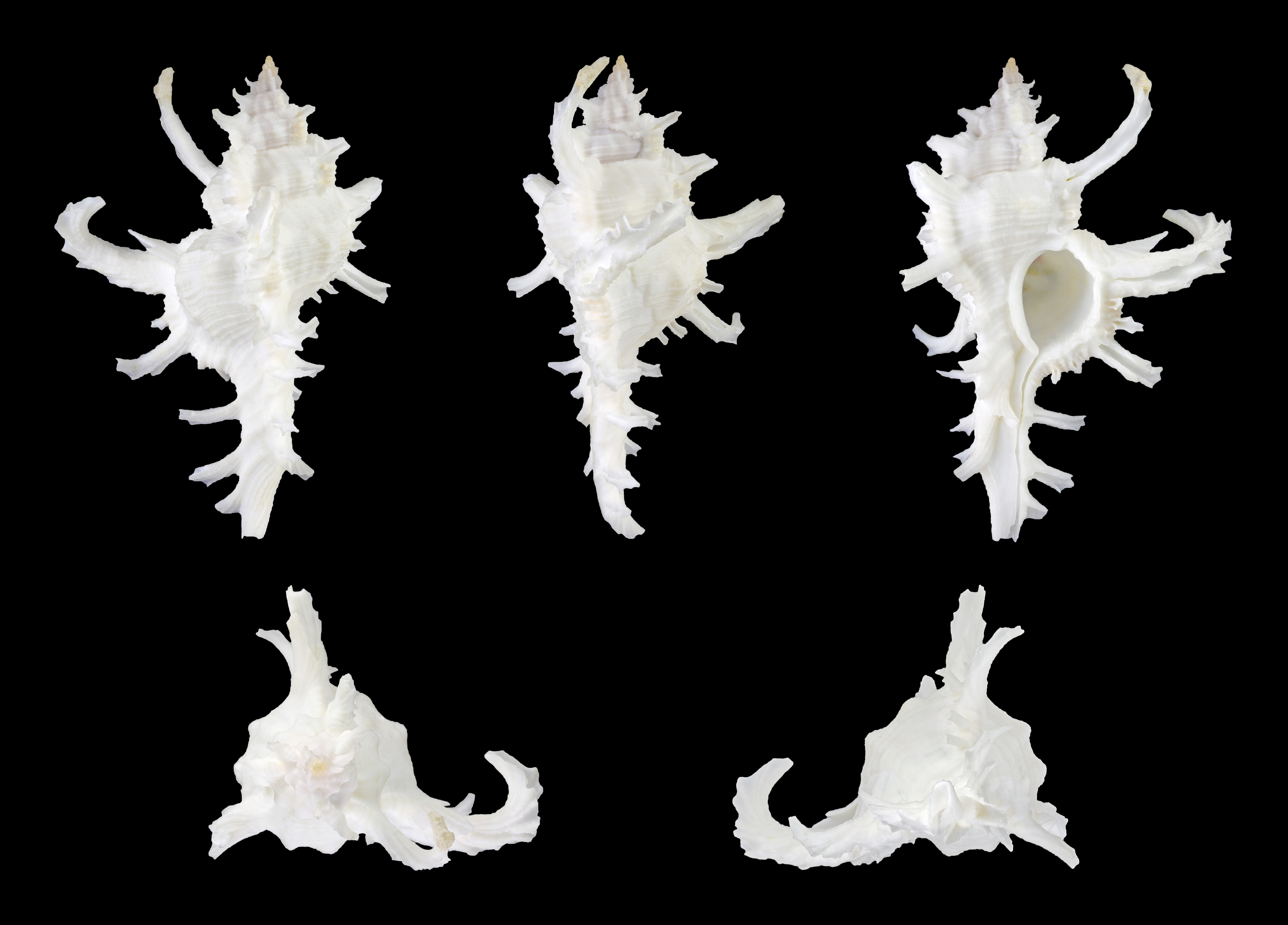
- A shell of Chicoreus axicornis

Scientific classification
- Kingdom: Animalia
- Phylum: Mollusca
- Class: Gastropoda
- Subclass: Caenogastropoda
- Order: Neogastropoda
- Family: Muricidae
- Genus: Chicoreus
- Species: C. axicornis

Binomial name
- Chicoreus axicornis (Lamarck, 1822)

Synonyms
- Murex axicornis Lamarck, 1822 murex kawamurai Shikama, 1964

= Chicoreus axicornis =

Species of gastropod

Chicoreus axicornis, the axicornis murex or centre-horned murex, is a species of sea snail, a marine gastropod mollusk in the family Muricidae, the murex snails or rock snails.

== Description ==
The shell of Chicoreus axicornis can reach a length of 25–95 millimetres (0.98–3.74 in). This shell is slender, with long, curved, acute shoulder spines. Color ranges from whitish or reddish to dark brown. Aperture is broad and rounded. Columellar lip is narrow, smooth. Outer lip is erect and crenulate. Siphonal canal is long, narrow and recurved.

== Distribution ==
This species is widespread from Indian Ocean to Philippines.
