= Chicoreus capucinus =

- A shell of Chicoreus capucinus

Scientific classification
- Kingdom: Animalia
- Phylum: Mollusca
- Class: Gastropoda
- Subclass: Caenogastropoda
- Order: Neogastropoda
- Family: Muricidae
- Genus: Chicoreus
- Species: C. capucinus

Binomial name
- Chicoreus capucinus (Lamarck, 1822)

Synonyms
- Chicoreus (Rhizophorimurex) capucinus (Lamarck, 1822) · accepted, alternate representation; Murex bituberculatus Baker, 1891; Murex capucinus Lamarck, 1822 (original combination); Murex castaneus Sowerby I, 1834; Murex lignarius A. Adams, 1853; Murex permaestus Hedley, 1915; Murex quadrifrons Lamarck, 1822; Naquetia capucina (Lamarck, 1822); Naquetia permaesta Cotton, B.C. 1956

Species of gastropod

The mangrove murex (Chicoreus capucinus) is a species of sea snail, a marine gastropod mollusk in the family Muricidae, the murex snails or rock snails.

== Distribution and habitat ==
These sea snails are widespread in the Indo-Pacific, from Philippines and Australia (Northern Territory, Queensland, Western Australia) to Fiji and the Solomon Islands. They live in mangroves and mud flats.

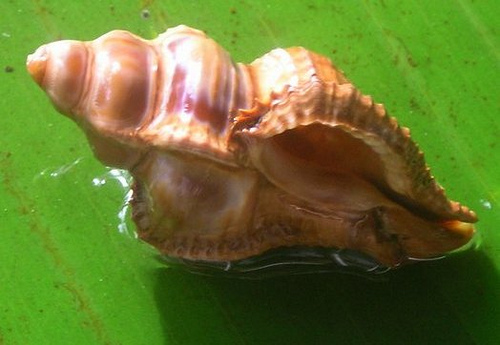
A shell of Chicoreus capucinus

== Description ==
Shells of Chicoreus capucinus can reach a size of 40–120 millimetres (1.6–4.7 in). These large shells are heavy and solid, elaborately textured, uniformly dark brown, with six convex whorls. They are sculptured with prominent spiral cords, axial ribs and striae. The aperture is rounded or oviform, brown tinged and the inner labial edge show 14–17 denticles. The siphonal canal is quite long. The operculum is dark brown.

== Biology ==
These voracious predators feed on the barnacles growing on mangroves and on mussels, snails and worms .

== Bibliography ==
- Alan Hinton – Shells of New Guinea & Central Pacific
- Merle D., Garrigues B. & Pointier J.-P. (2011) Fossil and Recent Muricidae of the world. Part Muricinae. Hackenheim: Conchbooks. 648 pp.
- Ngoc-Thach Nguyên – Shells of Vietnam
- Petit, R. E. (2009). George Brettingham Sowerby, I, II & III: their conchological publications and molluscan taxa. Zootaxa. 2189: 1–218
- R. Houart – Chicoreus and related genera in Indo-West Pacific
- R. Tucker Abbott – Seashells of South East Asia
