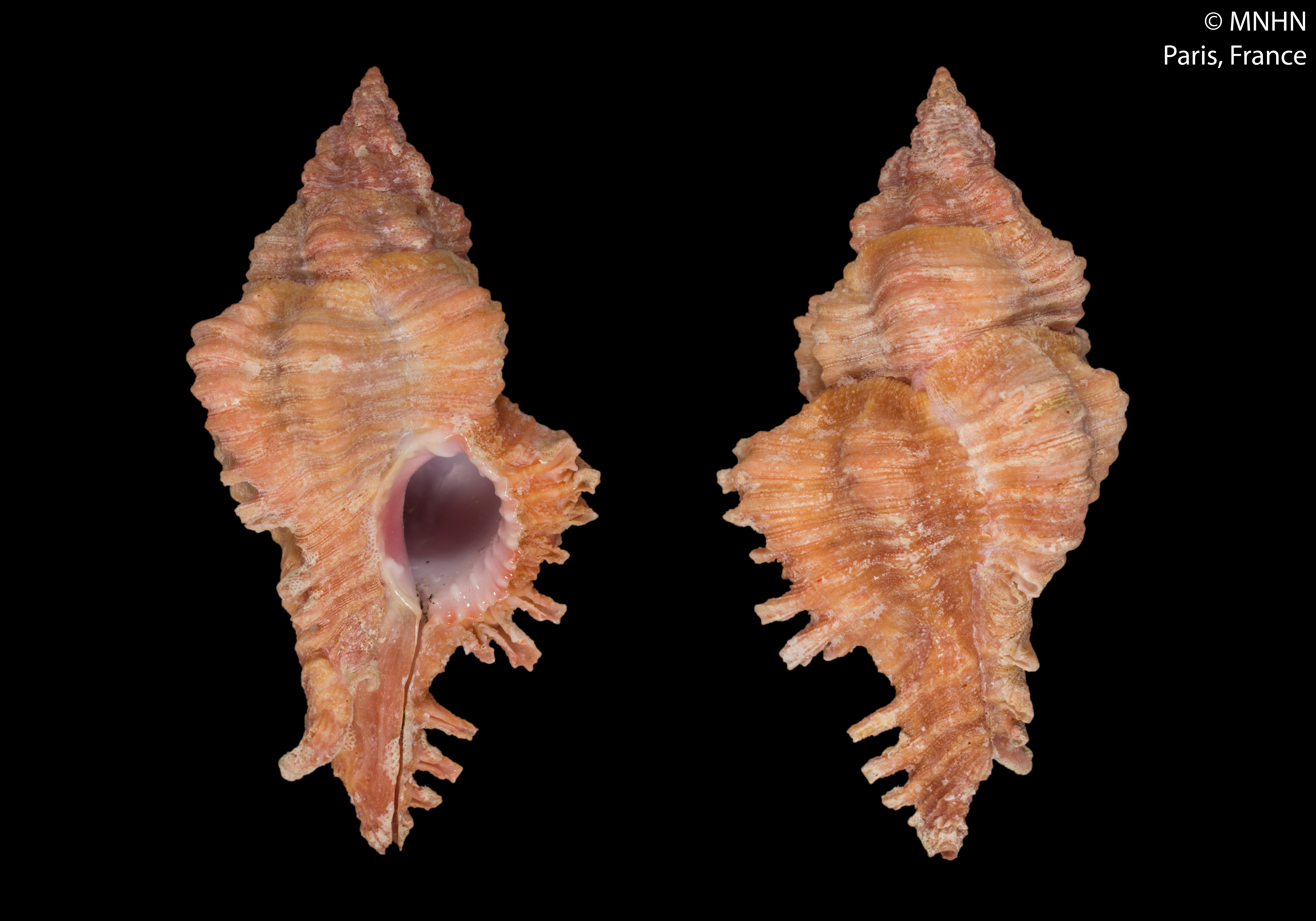
- Shell of Chicoreus lorenzi (holotype at MNHN, Paris)

Scientific classification
- Kingdom: Animalia
- Phylum: Mollusca
- Class: Gastropoda
- Subclass: Caenogastropoda
- Order: Neogastropoda
- Family: Muricidae
- Genus: Chicoreus
- Species: C. lorenzi

Binomial name
- Chicoreus lorenzi Houart, 2009

Synonyms
- Chicoreus (Triplex) lorenzi Houart, 2009· accepted, alternate representation

= Chicoreus lorenzi =

Species of gastropod

Chicoreus lorenzi is a species of sea snail, a marine gastropod mollusk in the family Muricidae, the murex snails or rock snails.

== Description ==
The length of the shell attains 47.4 mm. The shell is orange and shaped similar to that of a diamond.

== Distribution ==
This marine species occurs off French Polynesia.
