= Chicoreus corrugatus =

Scientific classification
- Kingdom: Animalia
- Phylum: Mollusca
- Class: Gastropoda
- Subclass: Caenogastropoda
- Order: Neogastropoda
- Family: Muricidae
- Genus: Chicoreus
- Species: C. corrugatus

Binomial name
- Chicoreus corrugatus Sowerby, 1841

Species of gastropod

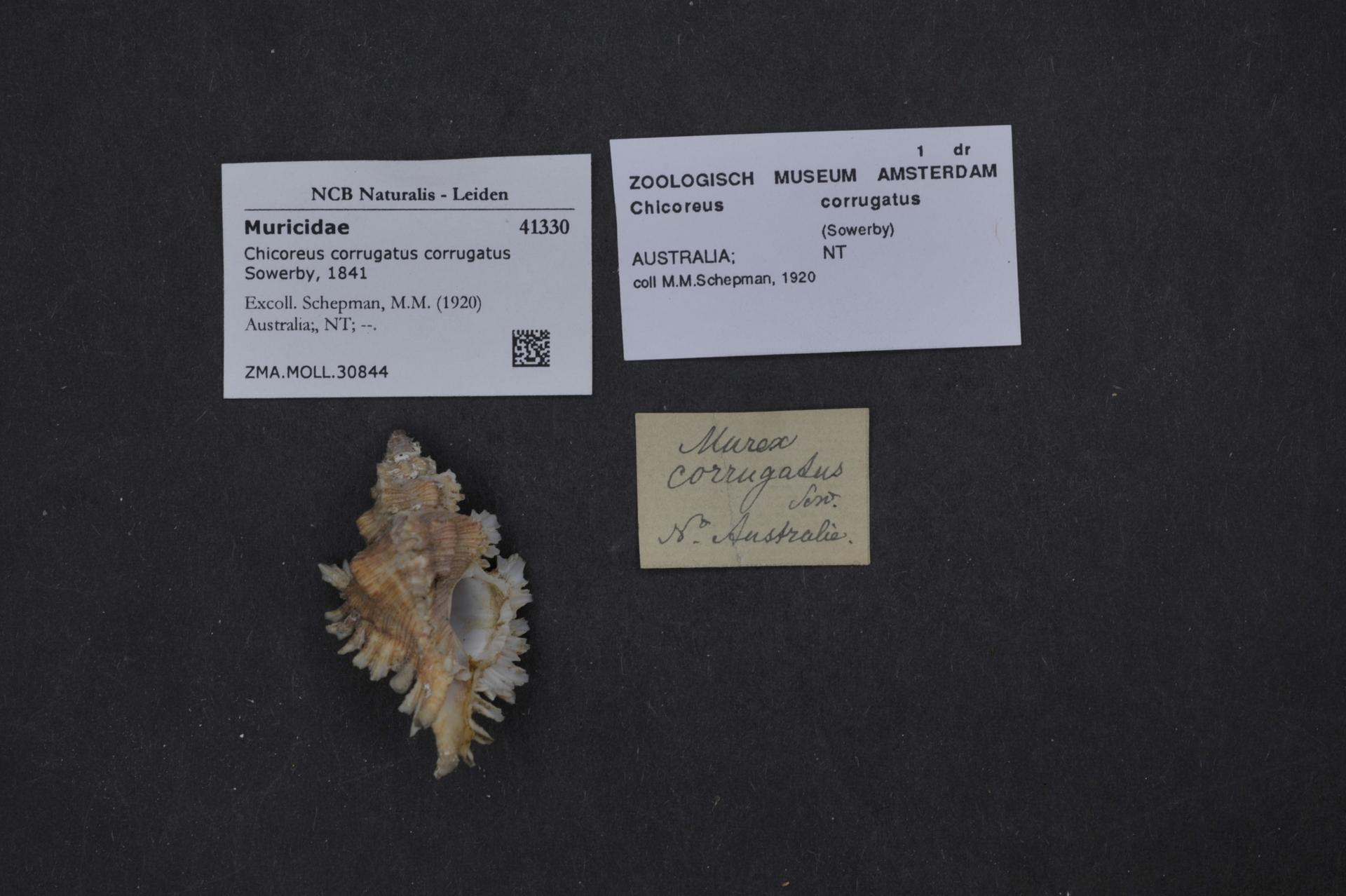
Chicoreus corrugatus

Chicoreus corrugatus is a species of sea snail, a marine gastropod mollusk in the family Muricidae, the murex snails or rock snails.

== Description ==
Size 3–5 cm (30-50mm).

== Distribution ==
Red Sea.
