= Chicoreus monicae =

Scientific classification
- Kingdom: Animalia
- Phylum: Mollusca
- Class: Gastropoda
- Subclass: Caenogastropoda
- Order: Neogastropoda
- Family: Muricidae
- Genus: Chicoreus
- Species: C. monicae

Binomial name
- Chicoreus monicae Bozzetti, 2001

Synonyms
- Chicoreus (Triplex) monicae Bozzetti, 2001

Species of gastropod

Chicoreus monicae is a species of sea snail, a marine gastropod mollusk in the family Muricidae, the murex snails or rock snails.

== Distribution ==
This marine species occurs off Madagascar.
