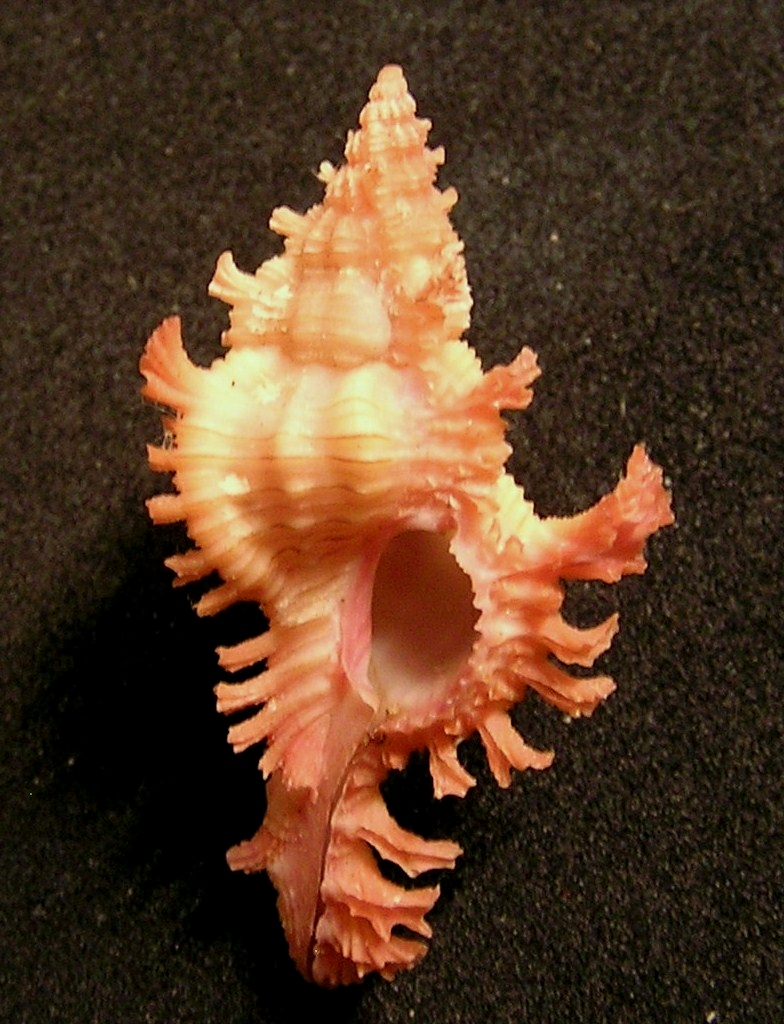
- Apertural view of Chicoreus nobilis

Scientific classification
- Kingdom: Animalia
- Phylum: Mollusca
- Class: Gastropoda
- Subclass: Caenogastropoda
- Order: Neogastropoda
- Family: Muricidae
- Genus: Chicoreus
- Species: C. nobilis

Binomial name
- Chicoreus nobilis Shikama, 1977

Synonyms
- Chicoreus nobilis Shikama, 1977

= Chicoreus nobilis =

Species of gastropod

Chicoreus nobilis, common name the noble murex, is a species of sea snail, a marine gastropod mollusk in the family Muricidae, the murex snails or rock snails.

== Description ==
The size of an adult shell varies between 40 mm and 57 mm.

== Distribution ==
This marine species is found along Vietnam, the Philippines and Japan.
