= Chicoreus territus =

Scientific classification
- Kingdom: Animalia
- Phylum: Mollusca
- Class: Gastropoda
- Subclass: Caenogastropoda
- Order: Neogastropoda
- Family: Muricidae
- Genus: Chicoreus
- Species: C. territus

Binomial name
- Chicoreus territus (Reeve, 1845)

Synonyms
- Murex nubilis Sowerby, 1860; Murex territus Reeve, 1845

Species of gastropod

Chicoreus territus is a species of sea snail, a marine gastropod mollusk in the family Muricidae, the murex snails or rock snails.
