= Chicoreus guillei =

Scientific classification
- Kingdom: Animalia
- Phylum: Mollusca
- Class: Gastropoda
- Subclass: Caenogastropoda
- Order: Neogastropoda
- Family: Muricidae
- Genus: Chicoreus
- Species: C. guillei

Binomial name
- Chicoreus guillei Houart, 1985

Synonyms
- Chicoreus (Chicopinnatus) guillei Houart, 1985· accepted, alternate representation; Pterynotus guillei Houart, 1985 (original combination)

Species of gastropod

Chicoreus guillei is a species of sea snail, a marine gastropod mollusk in the family Muricidae, the murex snails or rock snails.

== Distribution ==
This species occurs in the Indian Ocean off Réunion
