= Chicoreus zululandensis =

Scientific classification
- Kingdom: Animalia
- Phylum: Mollusca
- Class: Gastropoda
- Subclass: Caenogastropoda
- Order: Neogastropoda
- Family: Muricidae
- Genus: Chicoreus
- Species: C. zululandensis

Binomial name
- Chicoreus zululandensis Houart, 1989

Synonyms
- Chicoreus zululandensis Houart, 1989

Species of gastropod

Chicoreus zululandensis is a species of sea snail, a marine gastropod mollusk in the family Muricidae, the murex snails or rock snails.

== Description ==
It shows many visible similarities with Chicorius palmarosae and Chicorius banksii. A South Africa report said that it could measure approximately 28 mm. It is dark red with light-colored yellow lines.

== Distribution ==
Its scientific name, Chicorius zululadensis, comes from the fact that it is only found in South Africa, specifically near the Zulula town.
