= Chicoreus bourguignati =

Scientific classification
- Kingdom: Animalia
- Phylum: Mollusca
- Class: Gastropoda
- Subclass: Caenogastropoda
- Order: Neogastropoda
- Family: Muricidae
- Genus: Chicoreus
- Species: C. bourguignati

Binomial name
- Chicoreus bourguignati (Poirier, 1883)

Synonyms
- Chicoreus (Triplex) bourguignati (Poirier, 1883)· accepted, alternate representation; Murex bourguignati Poirier, 1883

Species of gastropod

Chicoreus bourguignati is a species of sea snail, a marine gastropod mollusk in the family Muricidae, the murex snails or rock snails.

== Description ==
The length of the shell varies between 6 and 10 centimeters.

== Distribution ==
This marine species occurs from Southeast Africa to Sri Lanka and Yemen.
