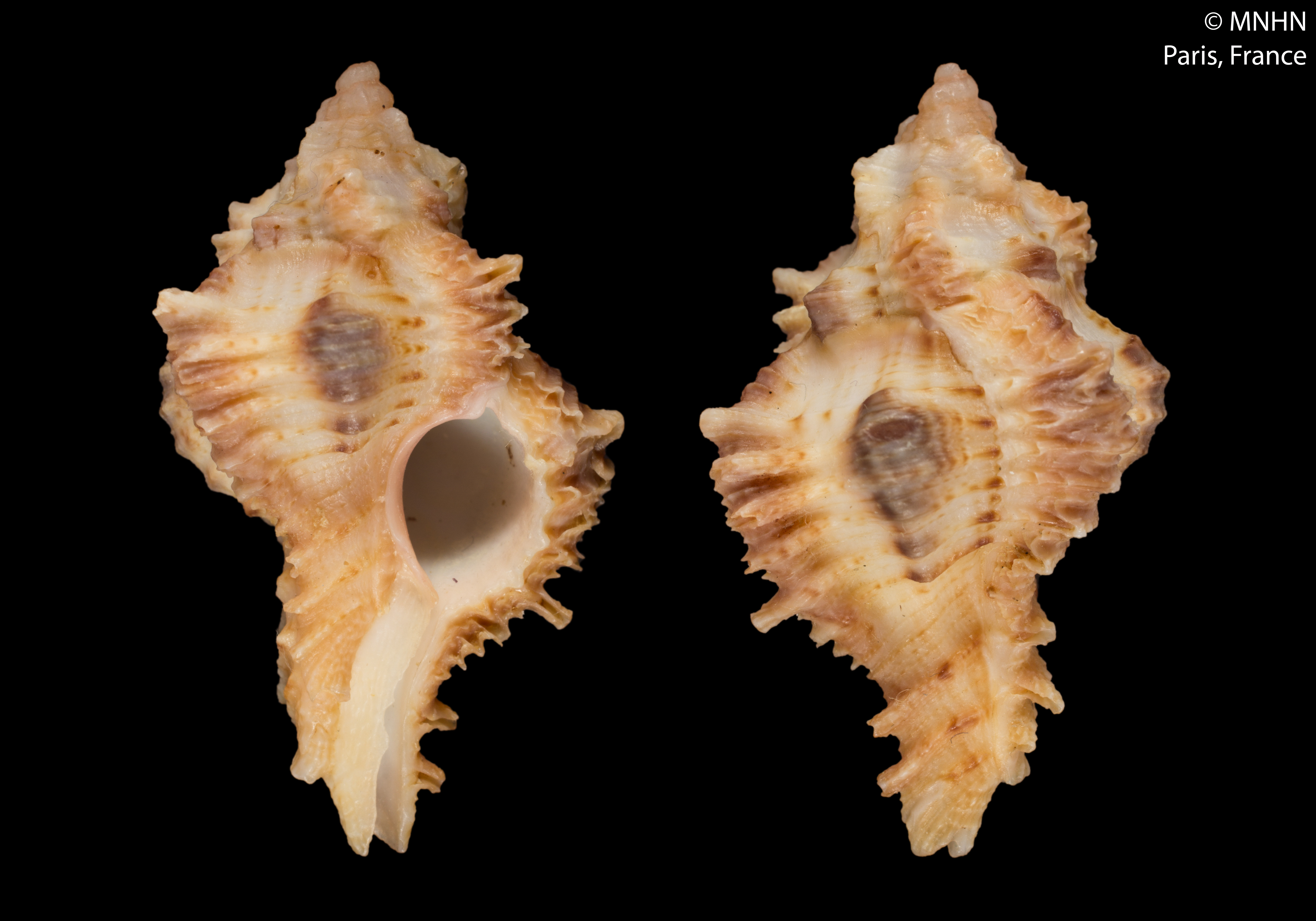
- Chicoreus elisae

Scientific classification
- Kingdom: Animalia
- Phylum: Mollusca
- Class: Gastropoda
- Subclass: Caenogastropoda
- Order: Neogastropoda
- Family: Muricidae
- Genus: Chicoreus
- Species: C. elisae

Binomial name
- Chicoreus elisae Bozzetti, 1991

Synonyms
- Chicoreus (Triplex) elisae Bozzetti, 1991

= Chicoreus elisae =

Species of gastropod

Chicoreus elisae is a species of sea snail, a marine gastropod mollusk in the family Muricidae, the murex snails or rock snails.

== Description ==
Original description: "Shell small for the Genus, biconical, with 5-6 teleoconch whorls.

Protoconch unknown. Aperture ovate, well-raised labial sinus continuing inside. Outer lip denticulate. Columellar lip callous, smooth, clearly separated from body of shell. Siphonal canal moderately long (about one-third of the shell), straight. Last teleoconch whorl with three varices and intervarical strong axial ribs with rounded profile. Spiral sculpture consisting of six cords, equally distributed from shoulder to adapical extremity of varix. Three additional cords on siphonal canal. Other spiral sculpture of numerous narrow striae. Short open spines formed where cords cross varices. Shoulder spine stronger.

Ground colour reddish-brown, varices and intervarical ribs dark brown. Dark brown blotches on spiral cords. Peristoma reddish, inside of aperture bluish-white. Operculum brown, covered by dense concentric striae."

== Distribution ==
Locus typicus: "Off Capo Ras Hafun, Horn of Africa, Somalia."

This marine species occurs off Somalia.
