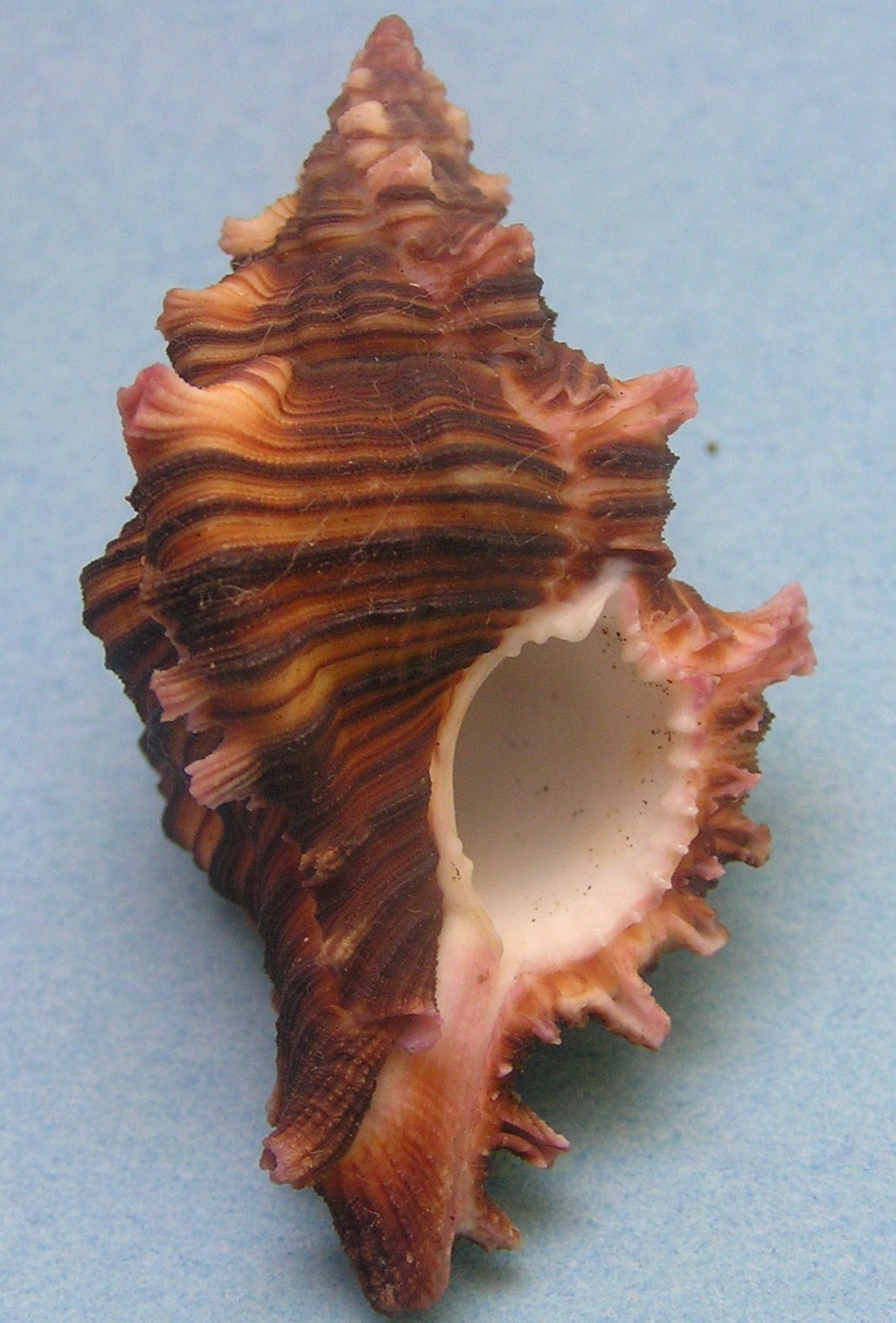
- Apertural view of Chicoreus maurus

Scientific classification
- Kingdom: Animalia
- Phylum: Mollusca
- Class: Gastropoda
- Subclass: Caenogastropoda
- Order: Neogastropoda
- Family: Muricidae
- Genus: Chicoreus
- Species: C. maurus

Binomial name
- Chicoreus maurus (Broderip, 1833)

Synonyms
- Chicoreus colpos Dall, W.H. in Burch, R.D., 1955; Chicoreus crassivaricosus Reeve, L.A., 1845; Chicoreus (Triplex) maurus (Broderip, 1833); Chicoreus mexicanus Stearns, R.E.C., 1894; Murex colpos Dall in Burch, 1955; Murex maurus Broderip, 1833 (basionym); Murex mexicanus Stearns, 1894; Murex steeriae Reeve, 1845

= Chicoreus maurus =

Species of gastropod

Chicoreus maurus, common name the Maurus murex, is a species of sea snail, a marine gastropod mollusk in the family Muricidae, the murex snails or rock snails.

== Description ==
The size of an adult shell varies between 25 mm and 95 mm.

== Distribution ==
This species occurs in the Pacific Ocean along Hawaii, the Marquesas Islands and New Caledonia.
