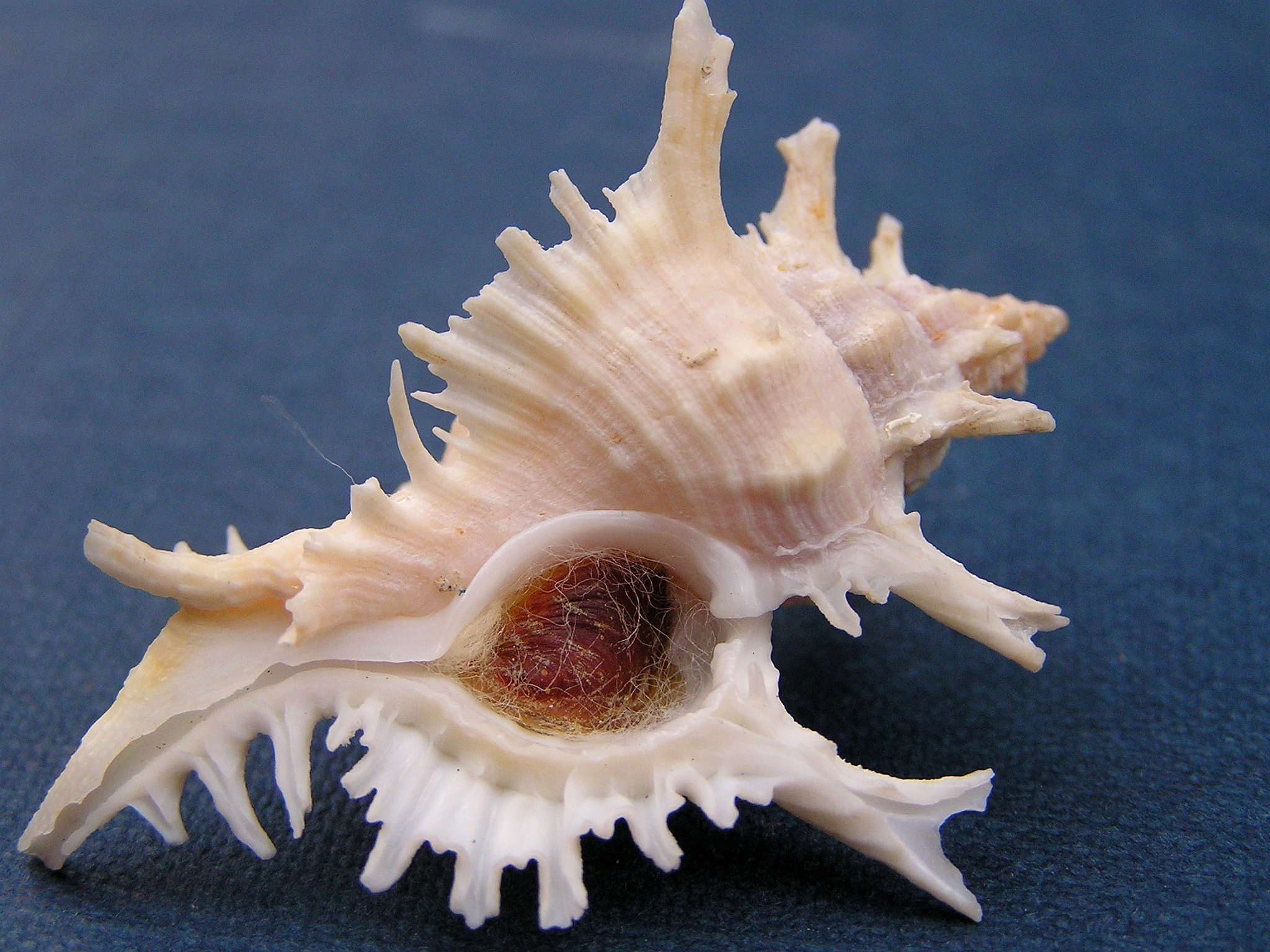
- Apertural view of Chicoreus damicornis
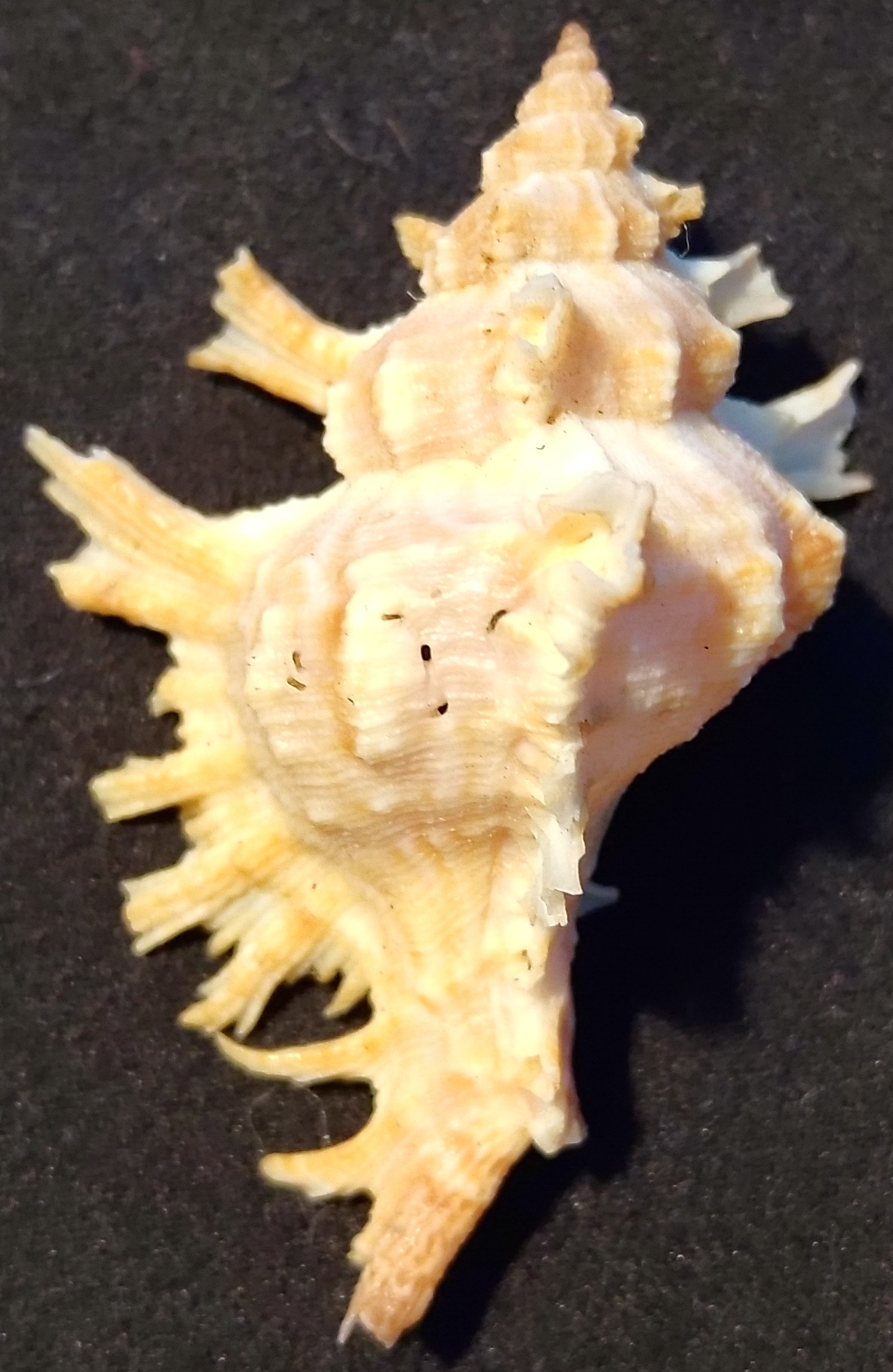

Scientific classification
- Kingdom: Animalia
- Phylum: Mollusca
- Class: Gastropoda
- Subclass: Caenogastropoda
- Order: Neogastropoda
- Family: Muricidae
- Genus: Chicoreus
- Species: C. damicornis

Binomial name
- Chicoreus damicornis (Hedley, 1903)

Synonyms
- Chicoreus (Triplex) damicornis (Hedley, 1903); Murex damicornis Hedley, 1903; Triplex cornucervi Perry, 1811

= Chicoreus damicornis =

Species of gastropod

Chicoreus damicornis, common name the long-horned murex, is a uncommon species of sea snail, a marine gastropod mollusk in the family Muricidae, the murex snails or rock snails.

== Description ==
The size of an adult shell varies between 25 mm and 80 mm. Characterized by the bifurcated tip on the longest shoulder spine. It coloration may vary it be may be uniformly white / fawn or with distinct spiral brown bands.

== Distribution ==
This subtidal marine species is found along Southeast Australia living in moderately deep water around -30~250m.
