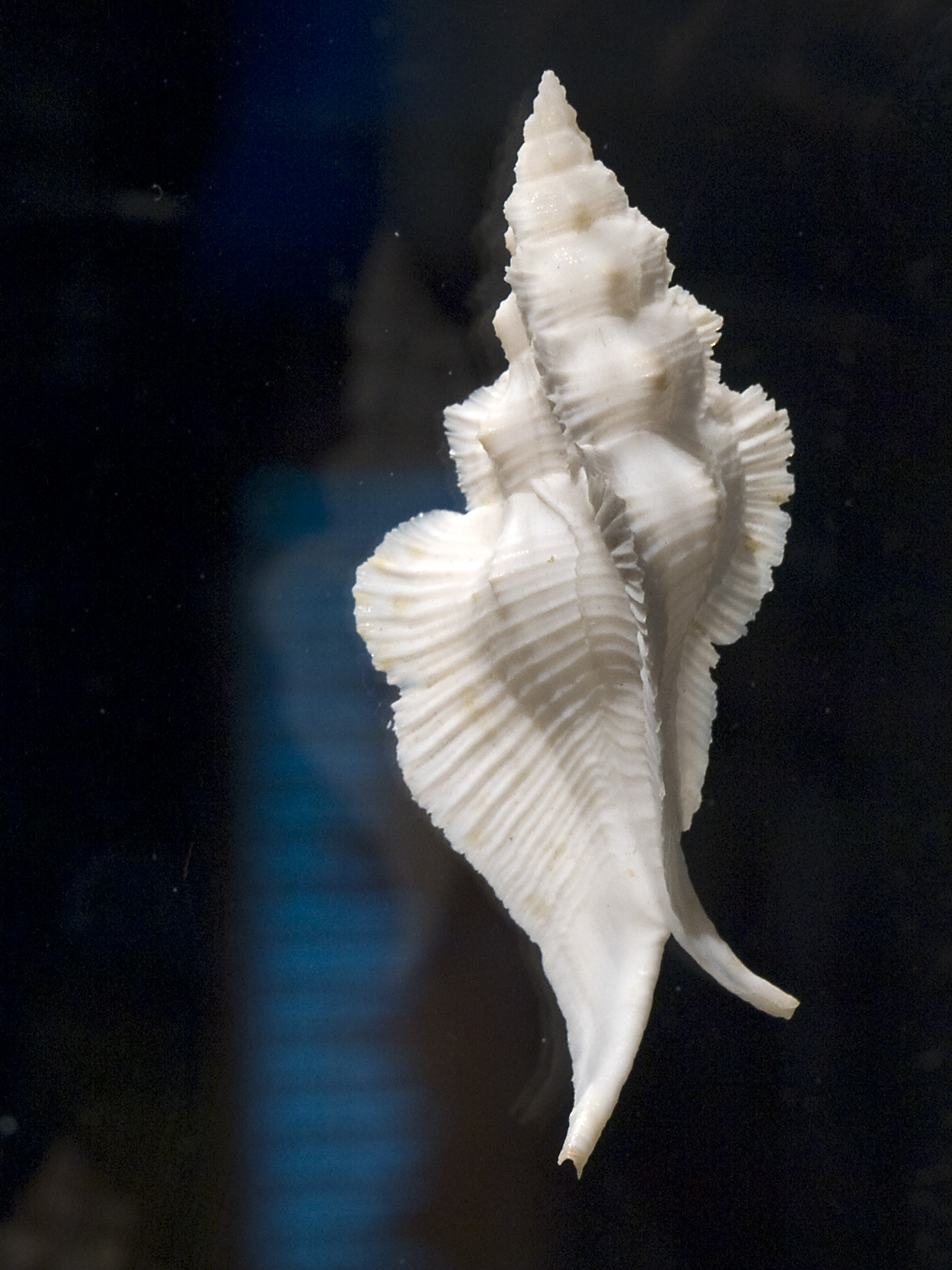
- Pterynotus alatus

Scientific classification
- Kingdom: Animalia
- Phylum: Mollusca
- Class: Gastropoda
- Subclass: Caenogastropoda
- Order: Neogastropoda
- Superfamily: Muricoidea
- Family: Muricidae
- Subfamily: Muricinae
- Genus: Pterynotus; Swainson, 1833

Type species
- Murex pinnatus Swainson, 1822

Synonyms
- List: Marchia Jousseaume, 1880; Murex (Pteronotus); Murex (Pterynotus); Pteronotus Swainson, 1833; Pterymarchia Houart, 1995; Pterymurex Rovereto, 1899; Pterynotus (Pterymarchia) Houart, 1995; Pterynotus (Pterynotus) Swainson, 1833

= Pterynotus =

Genus of gastropods

Pterynotus is a genus of sea snails, marine gastropod mollusks in the subfamily Muricinae of the family Muricidae incertae sedis, the murex snails or rock snails.

== Species ==
The following species are recognised in the genus Pterynotus:

- Pterynotus alatus (Röding, 1798)
- Pterynotus albobrunneus Bertsch & D'Attilio, 1980
- Pterynotus aparrii D'Attilio & Bertsch, 1980
- † Pterynotus aurorae Garvie, 1991
- Pterynotus barclayanus (H. Adams, 1873)
- Pterynotus bibbeyi (Radwin & D'Attilio, 1976)
- Pterynotus bipinnatus (Reeve, 1845)
- Pterynotus bouteti Houart, 1990
- † Pterynotus canhami (S. V. Wood, 1872)
- † Pterynotus defensus (Fuchs, 1870)
- † Pterynotus denudatus (Deshayes, 1835)
- Pterynotus elaticus (Houart, 2000)
- Pterynotus elongatus (Lightfoot, 1786)
- † Pterynotus fusoides (Deshayes, 1865)
- † Pterynotus gaasensis Merle, Pacaud, Ledon & Goret, 2024
- † Pterynotus granuliferus (Grateloup, 1833)
- Pterynotus laurae Houart, 1997
- Pterynotus martinetana (Röding, 1798)
- Pterynotus patagiatus (Hedley, 1912)
- Pterynotus pellucidus (Reeve, 1845)
- † Pterynotus pelouatensis Merle, Pacaud, Ledon & Goret, 2024
- † Pterynotus poustagnacensis Lozouet, 2023
- † Pterynotus rembangensis (Wanner & Hahn, 1935)
- † Pterynotus robustus Garvie, 2025
- † Pterynotus sabinola (K. van W. Palmer, 1960)
- † Pterynotus sandbergeri (M. Hörnes, 1856)
- † Pterynotus subquadrifrons (A. d'Orbigny, 1852)
- Pterynotus tripterus (Born, 1778)

=== Former species ===
- Pterynotus acanthopterus (Lamarck, 1816) reclassified as Pterochelus acanthopterus (Lamarck, 1816)
- Pterynotus akation E. H. Vokes, 1993 reclassified as Pterochelus akation (E. H. Vokes, 1993)
- Pterynotus angasi (Crosse, 1863) reclassified as Prototyphis angasi (Crosse, 1863)
- Pterynotus atlantideus Bouchet & Warén, 1985 reclassified as Timbellus atlantideus (Bouchet & Warén, 1985)
- Pterynotus bednalli (Brazier, 1878) reclassified as Timbellus bednalli (Brazier, 1878)
- †Pterynotus bifrons (Tate, 1888) reclassified as †Timbellus bifrons (Tate, 1888)
- Pterynotus brianbaileyi Mühlhäusser, 1984 reclassified as Chicoreus brianbaileyi (Mühlhäusser, 1984)
- Pterynotus bushae E. H. Vokes, 1970 synonymized with Timbellus phaneus (Dall, 1889)
- Pterynotus celinamarumai Kosuge, 1980 synonymized with Chicoreus orchidiflorus (Shikama, 1973)
- Pterynotus cerinamarumai Kosuge, 1980 synonymized with Chicoreus orchidiflorus (Shikama, 1973)
- Pterynotus concavopterus Kosuge, 1980 reclassified as Favartia concavoptera (Kosuge, 1980)
- †Pterynotus contabulatus (Lamarck, 1803) reclassified as †Pterochelus contabulatus (Lamarck, 1803)
- Pterynotus crauroptera Houart, 1991 reclassified as Timbellus crauroptera (Houart, 1991)
- †Pterynotus crenulatus (Röding, 1798) reclassified as †Timbellus crenulatus (Röding, 1798)
- †Pterynotus didymus (Tate, 1888) reclassified as †Timbellus didymus (Tate, 1888)
- Pterynotus duffusi (Iredale, 1936) reclassified as Pterochelus duffusi Iredale, 1936
- Pterynotus emilyae Espinosa, Ortea & Fernández-Garcés, 2007 reclassified as Timbellus emilyae (Espinosa, Ortea & Fernández-Garcés, 2007)
- †Pterynotus falsiornatus (Magne, 1940) synonymized with †Subpterynotus rhombicus (Meunier, 1880)
- Pterynotus fernandezi Houart, 2000 reclassified as Timbellus fernandezi (Houart, 2000)
- Pterynotus flemingi Beu, 1967 reclassified as Timbellus flemingi (Beu, 1967)
- Pterynotus fulgens Houart, 1988 reclassified as Timbellus fulgens (Houart, 1988)
- Pterynotus gambiensis (Reeve, 1845) reclassified as Purpurellus gambiensis (Reeve, 1845)
- Pterynotus gouldi A. Adams, 1863 reclassified as Ceratostoma burnettii (Reeve, 1849)
- Pterynotus guesti Harasewych & R. H. Jensen, 1979 reclassified as Timbellus guesti (Harasewych & R. H. Jensen, 1979)
- Pterynotus guillei Houart, 1985 synonymized with Chicoreus guillei Houart, 1985
- Pterynotus havanensis E. H. Vokes, 1970 reclassified as Timbellus havanensis (E. H. Vokes, 1970)
- †Pterynotus kaiparaensis C. A. Fleming, 1962 reclassified as †Timbellus kaiparaensis (C. A. Fleming, 1962)
- Pterynotus leucas (Locard, 1897) reclassified as Timbellus leucas (Locard, 1897)
- Pterynotus levii Houart, 1988 reclassified as Timbellus levii (Houart, 1988)
- Pterynotus lightbourni Harasewych & R. H. Jensen, 1979 synonymized with Timbellus lightbourni (Harasewych & R. H. Jensen, 1979)
- Pterynotus loebbeckei (Kobelt, 1879) reclassified as Chicoreus loebbeckei (Kobelt, 1879)
- Pterynotus macleani W. K. Emerson & D'Attilio, 1969 reclassified as Purpurellus macleani (W. K. Emerson & D'Attilio, 1969)
- Pterynotus maraisi E. H. Vokes, 1978 reclassified as Pygmaepterys maraisi (E. H. Vokes, 1978)
- Pterynotus marshalli Houart, 1989 sreclassified as Timbellus marshalli (Houart, 1989)
- †Pterynotus micropterus (Deshayes, 1835) reclassified as †Timbellus micropterus (Deshayes, 1835)
- Pterynotus miyokoae Kosuge, 1979 reclassified as Chicoreus miyokoae (Kosuge, 1979)
- Pterynotus norfolkensis C. A. Fleming, 1962 reclassified as Tripterotyphis norfolkensis (C. A. Fleming, 1962)
- Pterynotus orchidiflorus Shikama, 1973 reclassified as Chicoreus orchidiflorus (Shikama, 1973)
- Pterynotus phaneus (Dall, 1889) reclassified as Timbellus phaneus (Dall, 1889)
- Pterynotus phillipsi E. H. Vokes, 1966 synonymized with Pterochelus duffusi Iredale, 1936
- Pterynotus phyllopterus (Lamarck, 1822) reclassified as Timbellus phyllopterus (Lamarck, 1822)
- Pterynotus pinnatus (Swainson, 1822) reclassified as Pterynotus alatus (Röding, 1798)
- Pterynotus pinniger (Broderip, 1833) reclassified as Purpurellus pinniger (Broderip, 1833)
- † Pterynotus pseuderinaceus (Boettger, 1902): synonym of † Favartia pseuderinaceus (O. Boettger, 1902) (superseded combination)
- Pterynotus purpureus Azuma, 1976 synonymized with Pterynotus barclayanus (H. Adams, 1873)
- Pterynotus radwini Harasewych & R. H. Jensen, 1979 reclassified as Timbellus radwini (Harasewych & R. H. Jensen, 1979)
- Pterynotus richeri Houart, 1987 reclassified as Timbellus richeri (Houart, 1987)
- Pterynotus rubidus Houart, 2001 reclassified as Timbellus rubidus (Houart, 2001)
- †Pterynotus sondeianus K. Martin, 1895 reclassified as †Chicoreus sondeianus (K. Martin, 1895)
- Pterynotus stenostoma Houart, 1991 reclassified as Timbellus stenostoma (Houart, 1991)
- Pterynotus swansoni Hertlein & A. M. Strong, 1951 synonymized with Pteropurpura centrifuga (Hinds, 1844)
- Pterynotus triformis (Reeve, 1845) reclassified as Pterochelus triformis (Reeve, 1845)
- †Pterynotus tripteroides (Lamarck, 1822) reclassified as †Timbellus tripteroides (Lamarck, 1822)
- Pterynotus triqueter (Born, 1778) reclassified as Naquetia triqueter (Born, 1778)
- Pterynotus undosus E. H. Vokes, 1993 reclassified as Pterochelus undosus (E. H. Vokes, 1993)* †Pterynotus velificus (Tate, 1888) reclassified as †Timbellus velificus (Tate, 1888)
- Pterynotus vespertilio (Kira, 1959) reclassified as Timbellus vespertilio (Kira, 1959)
- † Pterynotus wallacei (Pritchard, 1898): synonym of Subpterynotus wallacei (Pritchard, 1898) (superseded combination)
- Pterynotus westralis Ponder & B. R. Wilson, 1973 reclassified as Pterochelus westralis (Ponder & B. R. Wilson, 1973)
- Pterynotus xenos Harasewych, 1982 reclassified as Timbellus xenos (Harasewych, 1982)
- Pterynotus zealandicus (Hutton, 1873) reclassified as Ponderia zealandica (Hutton, 1873)
