= Naquetia fosteri =

Scientific classification
- Kingdom: Animalia
- Phylum: Mollusca
- Class: Gastropoda
- Subclass: Caenogastropoda
- Order: Neogastropoda
- Family: Muricidae
- Genus: Naquetia
- Species: N. fosteri

Binomial name
- Naquetia fosteri D'Attilio & Hertz, 1987

Species of gastropod

Naquetia fosteri is a species of sea snail, a marine gastropod mollusk in the family Muricidae, the murex snails or rock snails.
