= Pterynotus aparrii =

Scientific classification
- Kingdom: Animalia
- Phylum: Mollusca
- Class: Gastropoda
- Subclass: Caenogastropoda
- Order: Neogastropoda
- Family: Muricidae
- Genus: Pterynotus
- Species: P. aparrii

Binomial name
- Pterynotus aparrii D'Attilio & Bertsch, 1980

Synonyms
- Pterymarchia aparri (D'Attilio & Bertsch, 1980); Pterynotus (Pterymarchia) aparrii D'Attilio & Bertsch, 1980

Species of gastropod

Pterynotus aparrii is a species of sea snail, a marine gastropod mollusk in the family Muricidae, the murex snails or rock snails.

== Description ==
The size of an adult shell varies between 30 mm and 40 mm.

== Distribution ==
This species is distributed in the Pacific Ocean along the Philippines.
