= Pterynotus albobrunneus =

Scientific classification
- Kingdom: Animalia
- Phylum: Mollusca
- Class: Gastropoda
- Subclass: Caenogastropoda
- Order: Neogastropoda
- Family: Muricidae
- Genus: Pterynotus
- Species: P. albobrunneus

Binomial name
- Pterynotus albobrunneus Bertsch & D'Attilio, 1980

Species of gastropod

Pterynotus albobrunneus is a species of sea snail, a marine gastropod mollusk in the family Muricidae, the murex snails or rock snails.
