= Pterynotus patagiatus =

Scientific classification
- Kingdom: Animalia
- Phylum: Mollusca
- Class: Gastropoda
- Subclass: Caenogastropoda
- Order: Neogastropoda
- Family: Muricidae
- Genus: Pterynotus
- Species: P. patagiatus

Binomial name
- Pterynotus patagiatus (Hedley, 1912)

Synonyms
- Murex patagiatus Hedley, 1912

Species of gastropod

Pterynotus patagiatus is a species of sea snail, a marine gastropod mollusk in the family Muricidae, the murex snails or rock snails.

== Description ==
Shell size: 50 mm.

== Distribution ==
Queensland, Australia.
