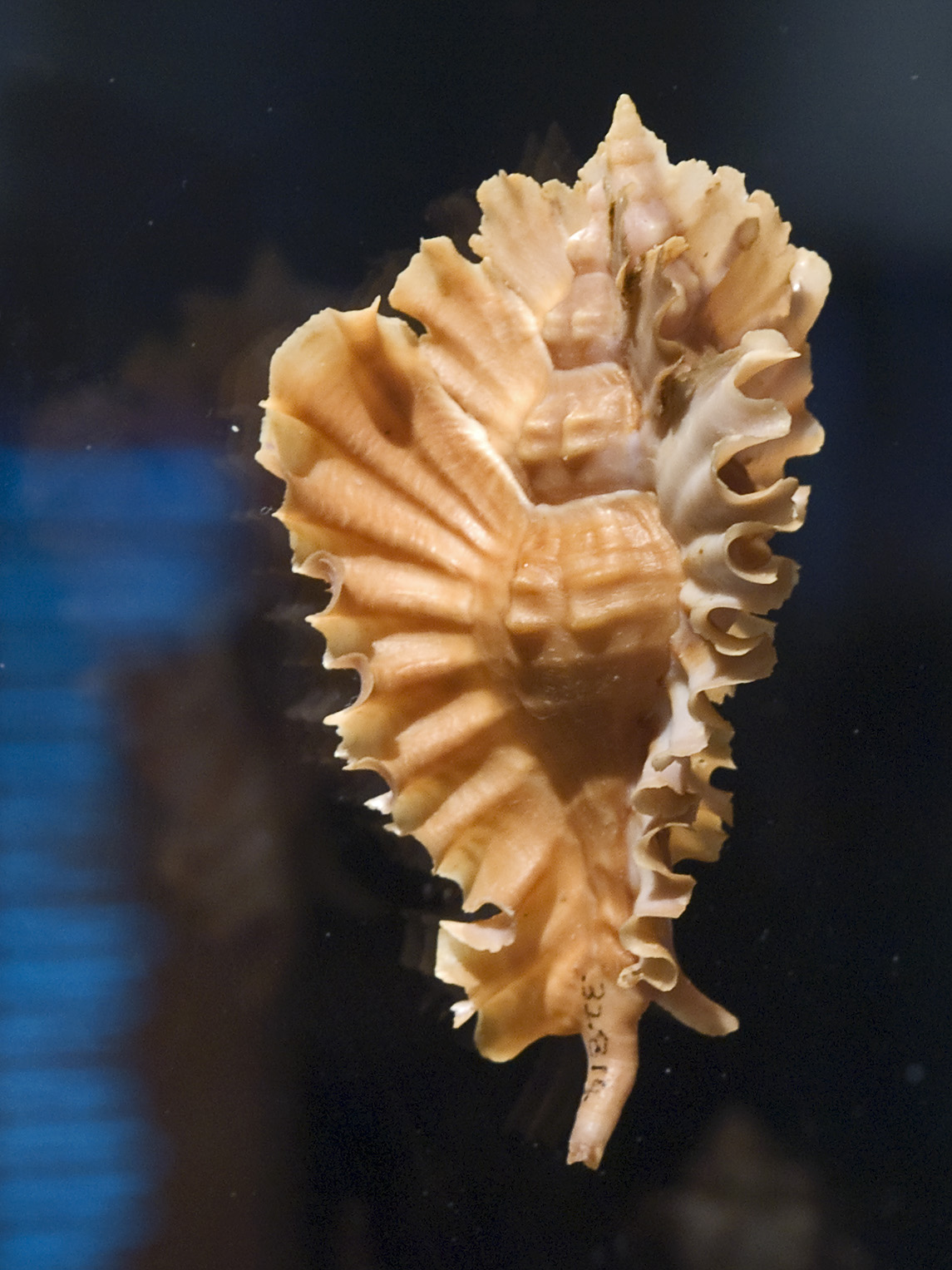
- A shell of Naquetia barclayi, anterior end towards the bottom of the page

Scientific classification
- Kingdom: Animalia
- Phylum: Mollusca
- Class: Gastropoda
- Subclass: Caenogastropoda
- Order: Neogastropoda
- Superfamily: Muricoidea
- Family: Muricidae
- Subfamily: Muricinae
- Genus: Naquetia; Jousseaume, 1880

Type species
- Murex triqueter Born, 1778

Synonyms
- Chicoreus (Naquetia) Jousseaume, 1880; Pterynotus (Naquetia) Jousseaume, 1880

= Naquetia =

Genus of gastropods

Naquetia is a genus of medium-sized sea snails, marine gastropod mollusks in the family Muricidae, the rock snails or murex snails.

== Species ==
Species within the genus Naquetia include:

- Naquetia annandalei (Preston, 1910)
- Naquetia barclayi (Reeve, 1858)
- Naquetia cumingii (A. Adams, 1853)
- Naquetia fosteri D'Attilio & Hertz, 1987
- Naquetia jickelii (Tapparone Canefri, 1875)
- Naquetia manwaii Houart & Héros, 2013
- Naquetia rhondae Houart & Lorenz, 2015
- Naquetia triqueter (Born, 1778)
- Naquetia vokesae Houart, 1986

Species brought into synonymy

- Naquetia capucina (Lamarck, 1822): synonym of Chicoreus capucinus (Lamarck, 1822)
- Naquetia superbus (G. B. Sowerby III, 1889): synonym of Chicomurex superbus (G. B. Sowerby III, 1889)
