= Naquetia barclayi =

Scientific classification
- Kingdom: Animalia
- Phylum: Mollusca
- Class: Gastropoda
- Subclass: Caenogastropoda
- Order: Neogastropoda
- Family: Muricidae
- Genus: Naquetia
- Species: N. barclayi

Binomial name
- Naquetia barclayi (Reeve, 1858)

Synonyms
- Murex barclayi Reeve, 1858; Naquetia annandalei (Preston, 1910); Pteronotus annandalei Preston, 1910

Species of gastropod

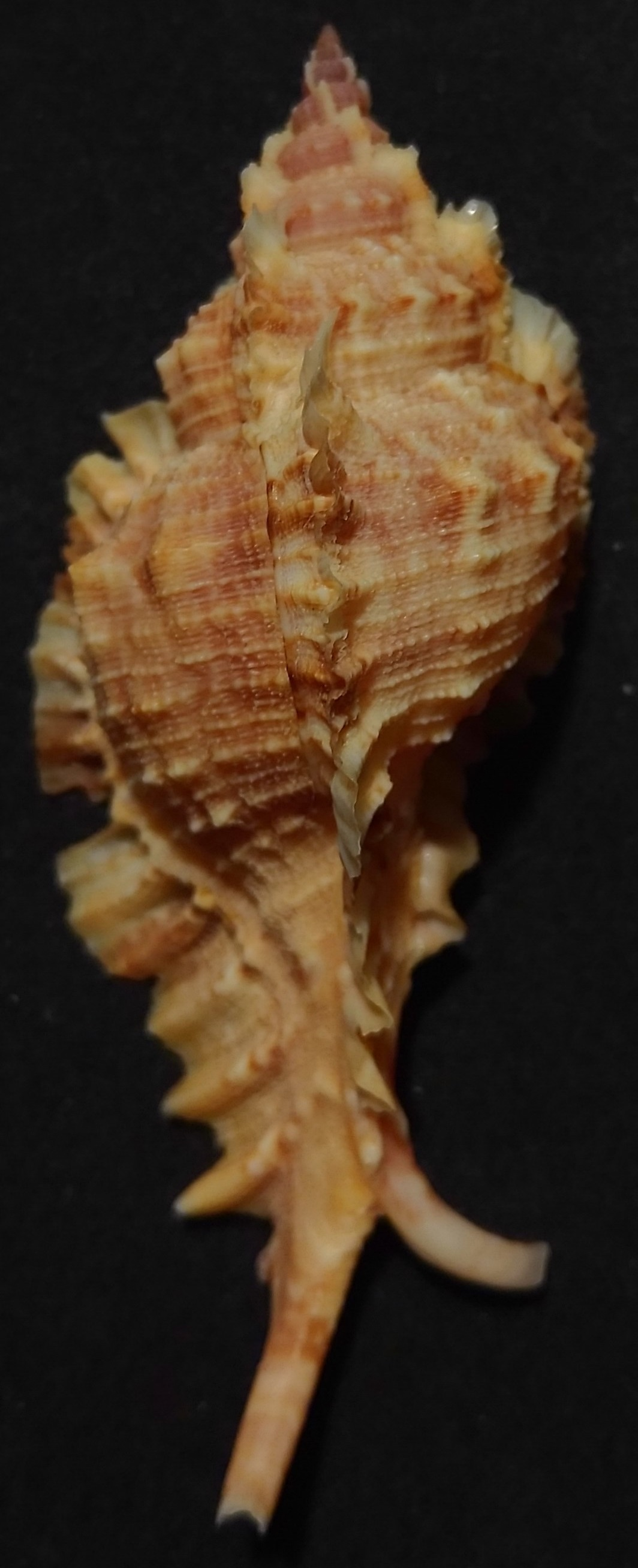

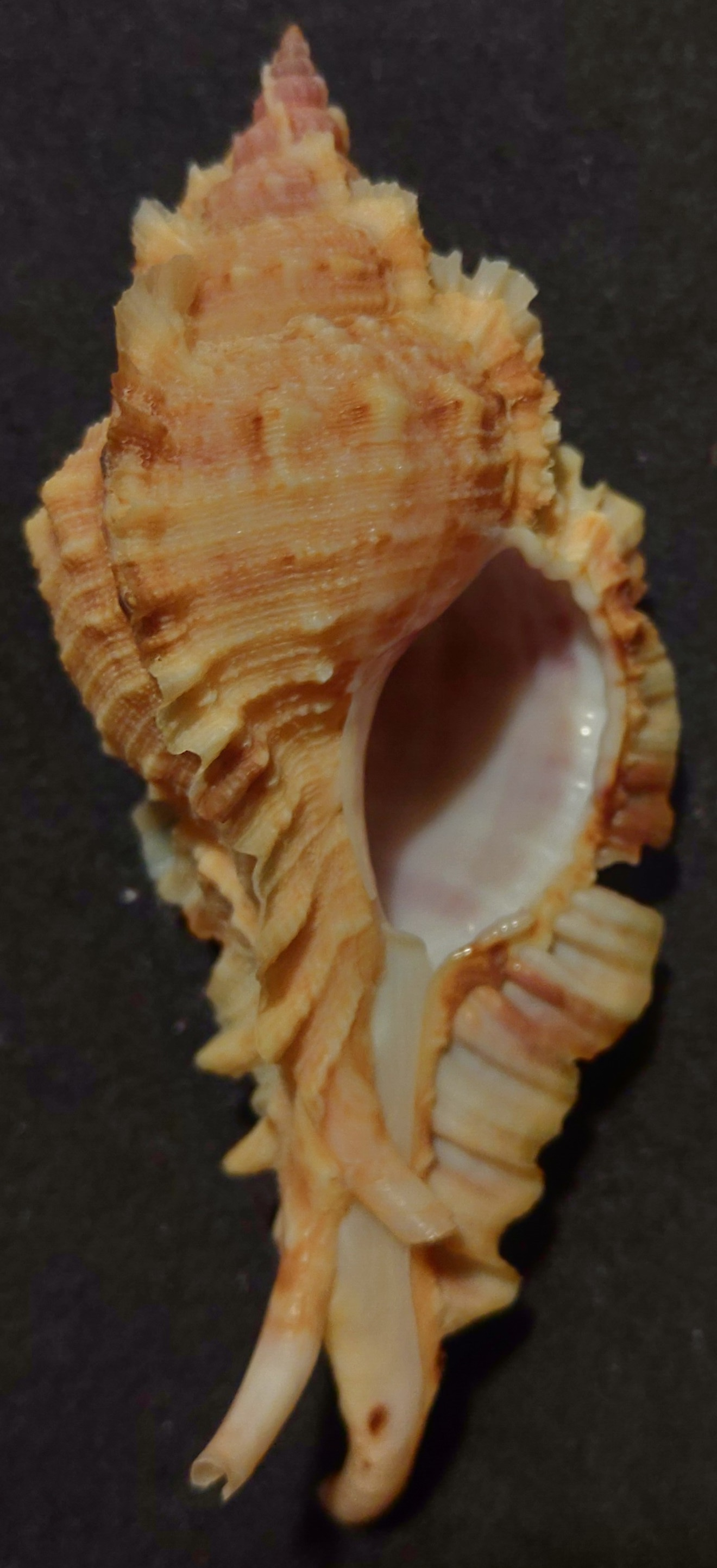

Naquetia barclayi, common name : Barclay's murex, is a species of sea snail, a marine gastropod mollusk in the family Muricidae, the murex snails or rock snails.

== Description ==
The shell size varies between 50 mm and 106 mm.

== Distribution ==
This species is distributed in the Red Sea and in the Indian Ocean along the Mascarene Basin and Mauritius; in the Western Pacific Ocean along India, the Philippines and Australia.
