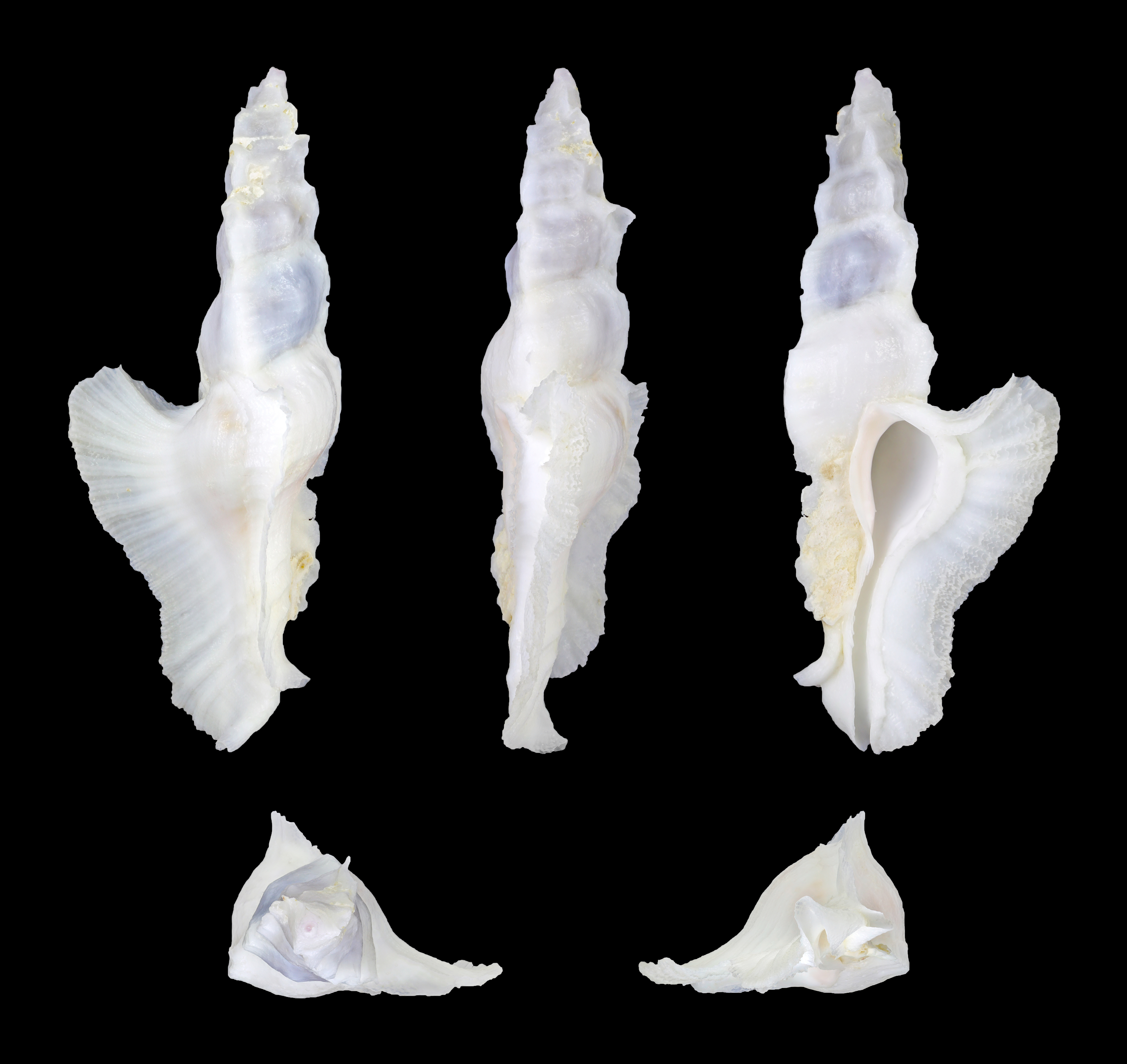
- Pterynotus elongatus

Scientific classification
- Kingdom: Animalia
- Phylum: Mollusca
- Class: Gastropoda
- Subclass: Caenogastropoda
- Order: Neogastropoda
- Family: Muricidae
- Genus: Pterynotus
- Species: P. elongatus

Binomial name
- Pterynotus elongatus (Lightfoot, 1786)

Synonyms
- Marchia elongata (Lightfoot, 1786); Murex clavus Kiener, 1842; Murex draco Röding, 1798; Murex elongatus Lightfoot, 1786; Pterynotus (Pterynotus) elongatus (Lightfoot, 1786) · accepted, alternate representation

= Pterynotus elongatus =

Species of gastropod

Pterynotus elongatus, commonly known as club murex, is a species of sea snail, a marine gastropod mollusk in the family Muricidae, the murex snails or rock snails.

== Description ==
The shell size varies between 50 mm and 100 mm.

== Distribution ==
This species is distributed in the Red Sea and in the Indo-West Pacific.
