= Pterochelus ariomus =

Scientific classification
- Kingdom: Animalia
- Phylum: Mollusca
- Class: Gastropoda
- Subclass: Caenogastropoda
- Order: Neogastropoda
- Family: Muricidae
- Genus: Pterochelus
- Species: P. ariomus

Binomial name
- Pterochelus ariomus (Clench & Farfante, 1945)

Synonyms
- Murex (Pterynotus) ariomus Clench & Farfante, 1945; Murex helenae Verrill, 1953

Species of gastropod

Pterochelus ariomus is a species of sea snail, a marine gastropod mollusk in the family Muricidae, the murex snails or rock snails.
