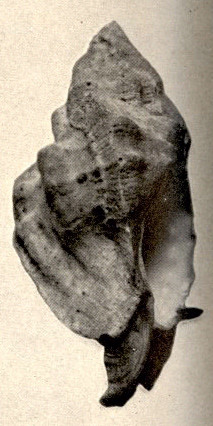

Scientific classification
- Kingdom: Animalia
- Phylum: Mollusca
- Class: Gastropoda
- Subclass: Caenogastropoda
- Order: Neogastropoda
- Family: Muricidae
- Genus: Ceratostoma
- Species: C. nuttalli

Binomial name
- Ceratostoma nuttalli Conrad, 1837

Synonyms
- Murex nuttalli Conrad, 1837; Murex unicornis Reeve, 1849; Purpura albescens Dall, 1919; Purpura albofasciata Dall, 1919

= Ceratostoma nuttalli =

Species of gastropod

Ceratostoma nuttalli is a species of sea snail, a marine gastropod mollusk in the family Muricidae, the murex snails or rock snails.
