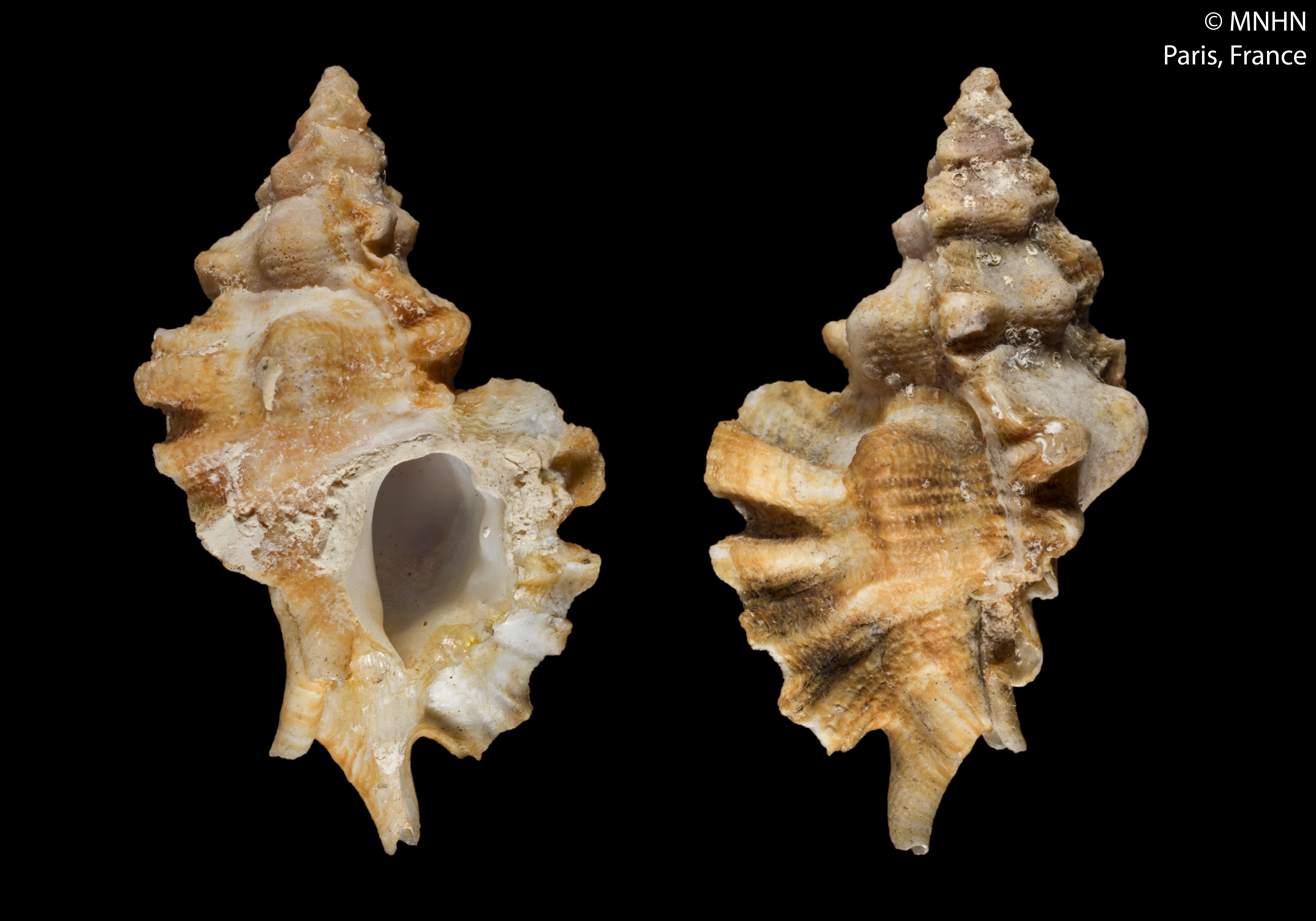

Scientific classification
- Kingdom: Animalia
- Phylum: Mollusca
- Class: Gastropoda
- Subclass: Caenogastropoda
- Order: Neogastropoda
- Family: Muricidae
- Genus: Ceratostoma
- Species: C. fournieri

Binomial name
- Ceratostoma fournieri (Crosse, 1861)

Synonyms
- Murex emarginatus Sowerby, 1841; Murex fournieri Crosse, 1861

= Ceratostoma fournieri =

Species of gastropod

Ceratostoma fournieri is a species of sea snail, a marine gastropod mollusk in the family Muricidae, the murex snails or rock snails.
