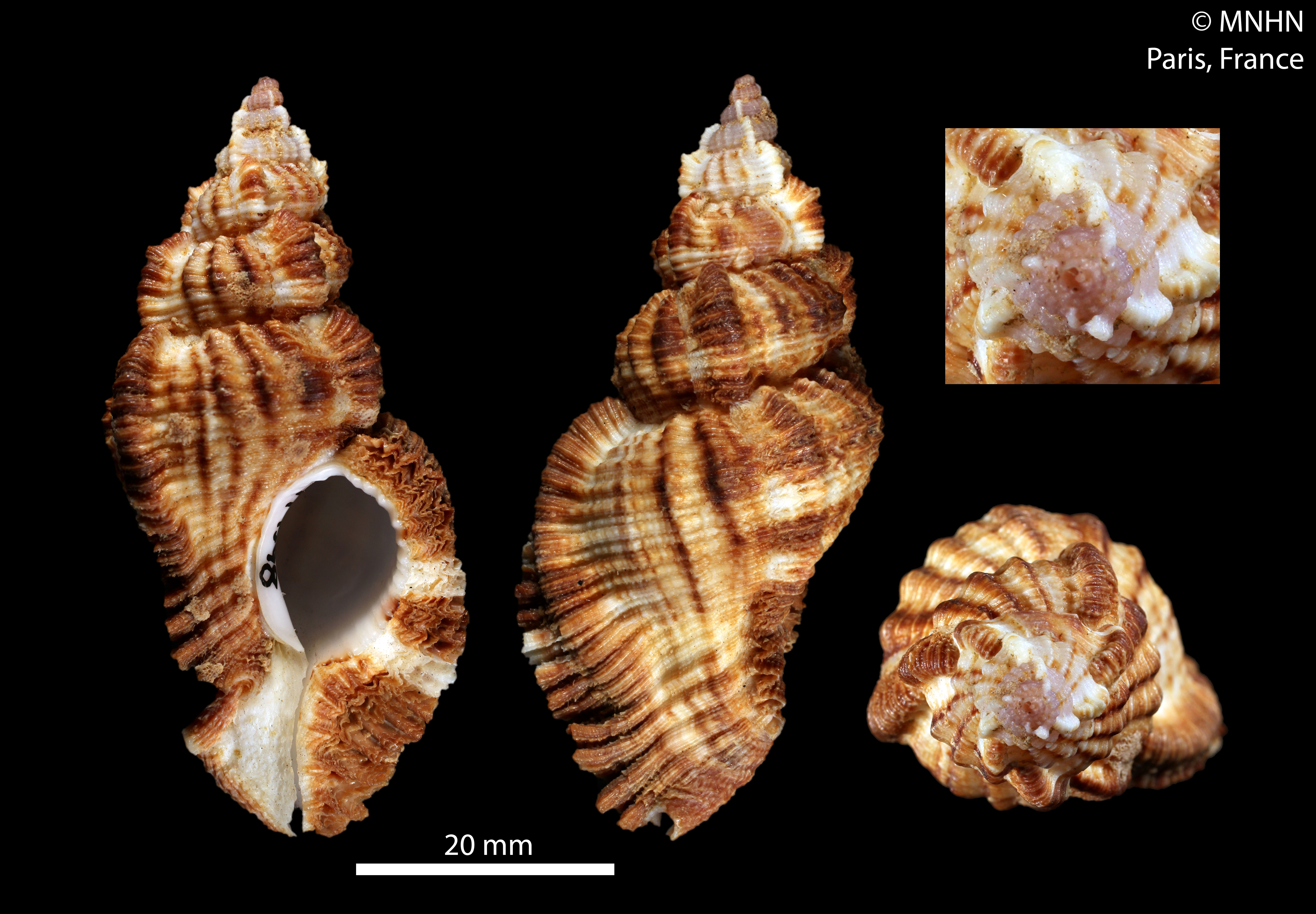
- Shell of Naquetia vokesae (paratype at MNHN, Paris)

Scientific classification
- Kingdom: Animalia
- Phylum: Mollusca
- Class: Gastropoda
- Subclass: Caenogastropoda
- Order: Neogastropoda
- Family: Muricidae
- Genus: Naquetia
- Species: N. vokesae

Binomial name
- Naquetia vokesae Houart, 1986

Synonyms
- Chicoreus (Naquetia) triqueter vokesae Houart, 1986 (original combination)

= Naquetia vokesae =

Species of gastropod

Naquetia vokesae is a species of sea snail, a marine gastropod mollusk in the family Muricidae, the murex snails or rock snails.

== Distribution ==
This marine species occurs off Mozambique, South Africa, N Zululand and Natal; Madagascar; Comoros Islands; Tanzania and Southern Zanzibar in the western Indian Ocean and probably the Philippines, in the Pacific Ocean.
