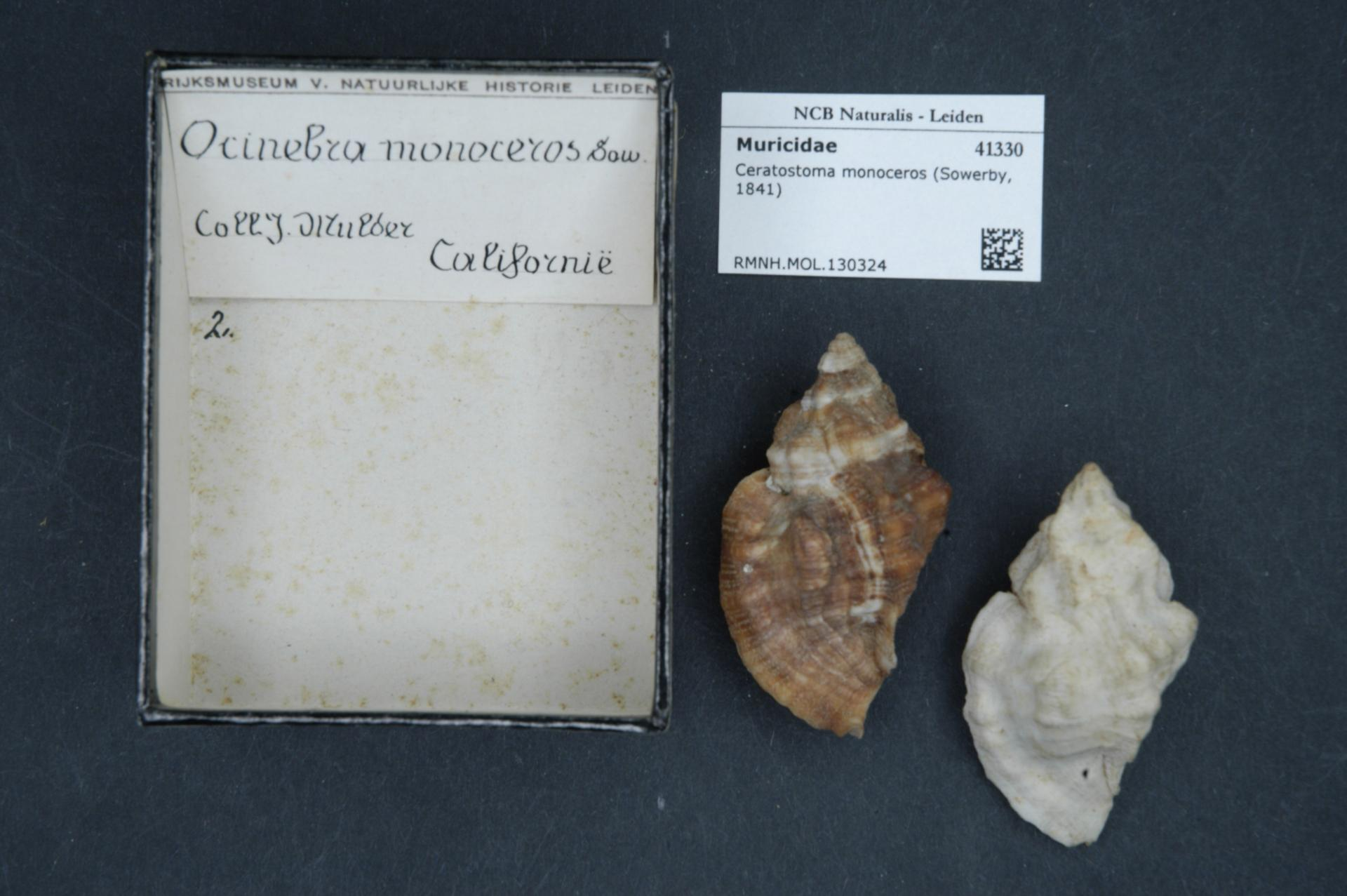

Scientific classification
- Kingdom: Animalia
- Phylum: Mollusca
- Class: Gastropoda
- Subclass: Caenogastropoda
- Order: Neogastropoda
- Family: Muricidae
- Genus: Ceratostoma
- Species: C. monoceros

Binomial name
- Ceratostoma monoceros (Sowerby, 1841)

Synonyms
- Murex aciculiger Valenciennes, 1846; Murex monoceros Sowerby, 1841

= Ceratostoma monoceros =

Species of gastropod

Ceratostoma monoceros is a species of sea snail, a marine gastropod mollusk in the family Muricidae, the murex snails or rock snails.
