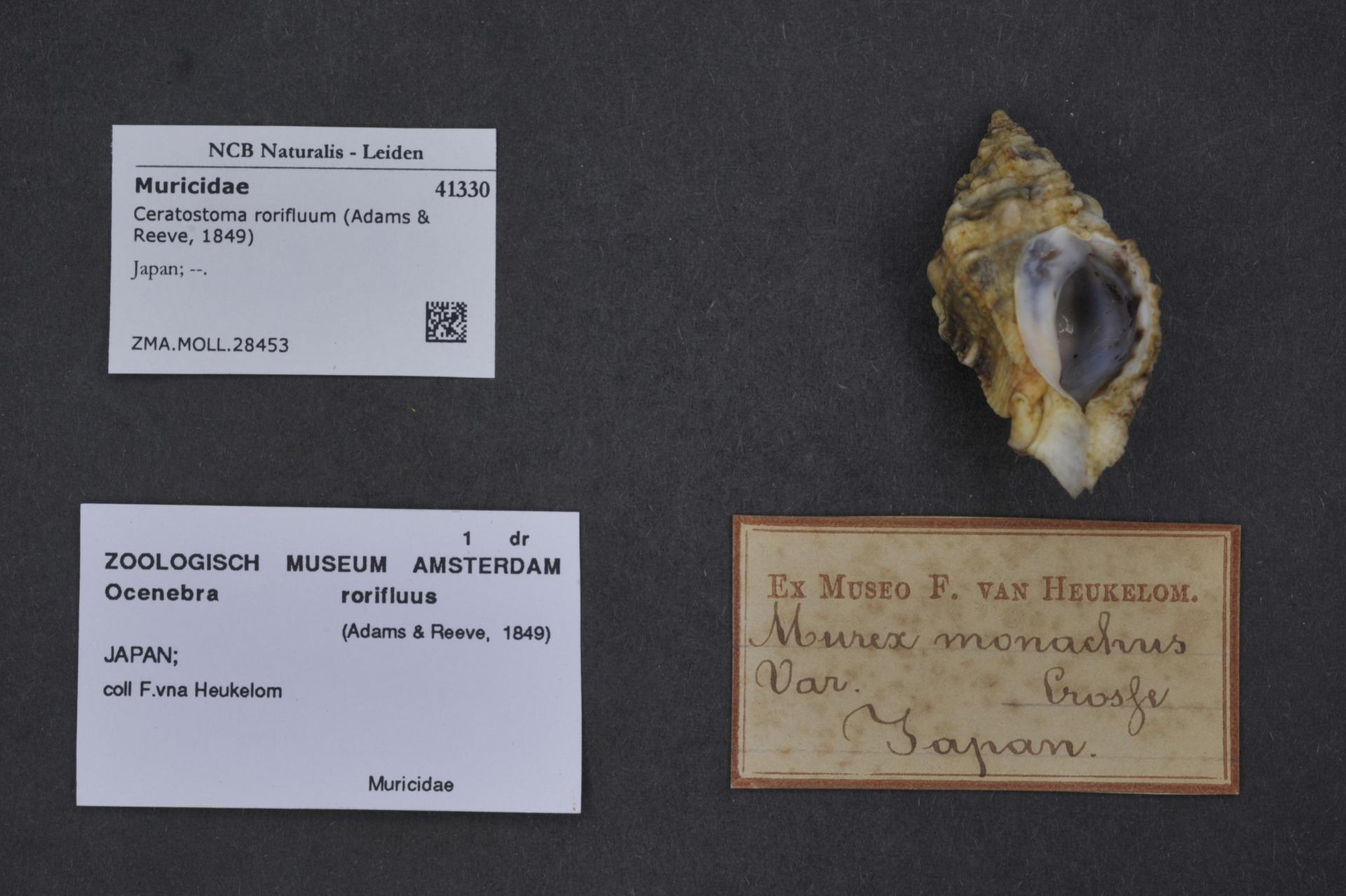

Scientific classification
- Kingdom: Animalia
- Phylum: Mollusca
- Class: Gastropoda
- Subclass: Caenogastropoda
- Order: Neogastropoda
- Family: Muricidae
- Genus: Ceratostoma
- Species: C. rorifluum

Binomial name
- Ceratostoma rorifluum (Adams & Reeve, 1849)

Synonyms
- Murex monachus Crosse, 1862; Murex rorifluum Adams & Reeve, 1849

= Ceratostoma rorifluum =

Species of gastropod

Ceratostoma rorifluum is a species of sea snail, a marine gastropod mollusk in the family Muricidae, the murex snails or rock snails.
