= Pterynotus bibbeyi =

Scientific classification
- Kingdom: Animalia
- Phylum: Mollusca
- Class: Gastropoda
- Subclass: Caenogastropoda
- Order: Neogastropoda
- Family: Muricidae
- Genus: Pterynotus
- Species: P. bibbeyi

Binomial name
- Pterynotus bibbeyi (Radwin & D'Attilio, 1976)

Synonyms
- Marchia bibbeyi Radwin & D'Attilio, 1976; Pterymarchia bibbeyi (Radwin & D'Attilio, 1976); Pterynotus (Pterymarchia) bibbeyi (Radwin & D'Attilio, 1976)

Species of gastropod

Pterynotus bibbeyi is a species of sea snail, a marine gastropod mollusk in the family Muricidae, the murex snails or rock snails.
