= Pterynotus bouteti =

Scientific classification
- Kingdom: Animalia
- Phylum: Mollusca
- Class: Gastropoda
- Subclass: Caenogastropoda
- Order: Neogastropoda
- Family: Muricidae
- Genus: Pterynotus
- Species: P. bouteti

Binomial name
- Pterynotus bouteti Houart, 1990

Synonyms
- Pterymarchia bouteti (Houart, 1990); Pterynotus (Pterymarchia) bouteti Houart, 1990

Species of gastropod

Pterynotus bouteti is a species of sea snail, a marine gastropod mollusk in the family Muricidae, the murex snails or rock snails.
