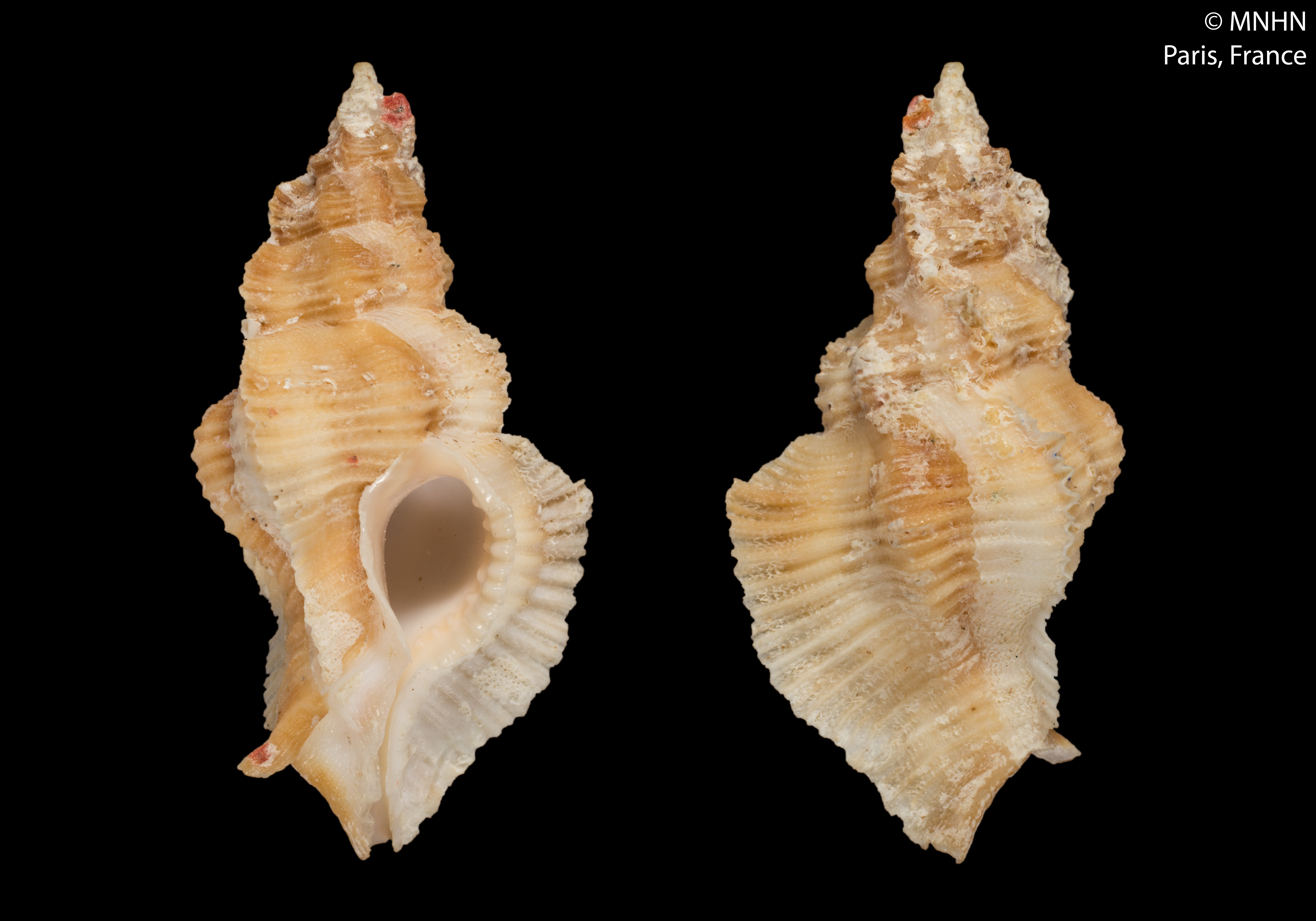
- Shell of Pterynotus laurae (holotype at MNHN, Paris)

Scientific classification
- Kingdom: Animalia
- Phylum: Mollusca
- Class: Gastropoda
- Subclass: Caenogastropoda
- Order: Neogastropoda
- Family: Muricidae
- Genus: Pterynotus
- Species: P. laurae

Binomial name
- Pterynotus laurae Houart, 1997

Synonyms
- Pterynotus (Pterynotus) laurae Houart, 1997· accepted, alternate representation

= Pterynotus laurae =

Species of gastropod

Pterynotus laurae is a species of sea snail, a marine gastropod mollusk in the family Muricidae, the murex snails or rock snails.

== Description ==
The length of the shell attains 46.4 mm.

== Distribution ==
This marine species occurs off the Philippines.
