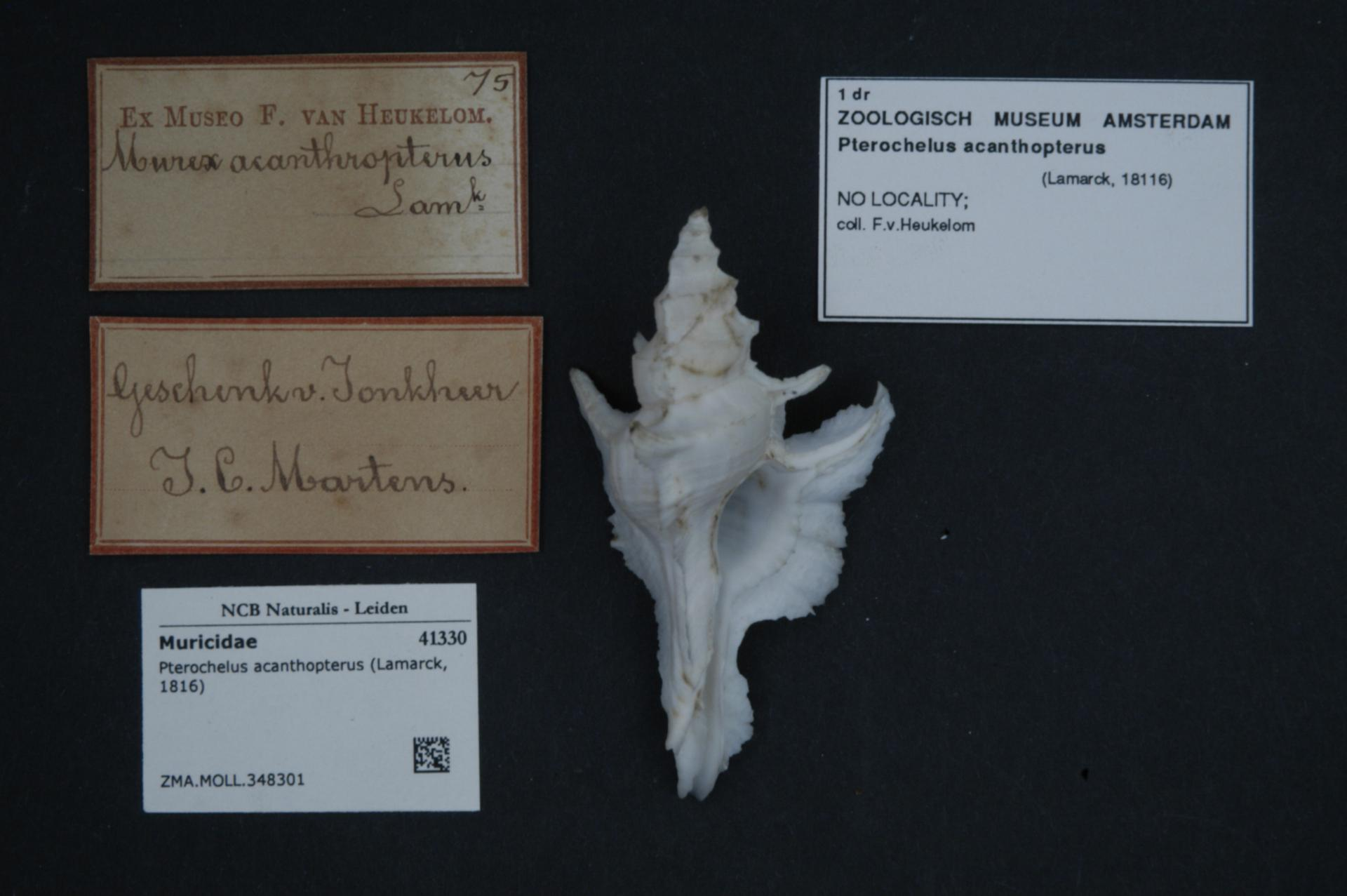

Scientific classification
- Kingdom: Animalia
- Phylum: Mollusca
- Class: Gastropoda
- Subclass: Caenogastropoda
- Order: Neogastropoda
- Family: Muricidae
- Subfamily: Muricinae
- Genus: Pterochelus; Jousseaume, 1880

Synonyms
- Murex (Alipurpura) P. Fischer, 1884 junior subjective synonym; Pteronotus (Pterochelus) Jousseaume, 1880 superseded rank; Pteropurpura (Alipurpura) P. Fischer, 1884 junior subjective synonym; Pterynotus (Pterochelus) Jousseaume, 1880 superseded rank

= Pterochelus =

Genus of gastropods

Pterochelus is a genus of sea snails, marine gastropod mollusks in the subfamily Muricinae of the family Muricidae, the murex snails or rock snails.

== Species ==
Species within the genus Pterochelus include:

- Pterochelus acanthopterus (Lamarck, 1816)
- † Pterochelus adelaidensis (Tate, 1888)
- Pterochelus akation (Vokes, 1993)
- Pterochelus ariomus (Clench & Farfante, 1945)
- † Pterochelus contabulatus (Lamarck, 1803)
- Pterochelus duffusi Iredale, 1936
- † Pterochelus manubriatus (Tate, 1888)
- † Pterochelus rhysus (Tate, 1888) †
- Pterochelus saibaiensis (Melvill & Standen, 1899)
- † Pterochelus tenuicornis (Tate, 1888)
- Pterochelus triformis (Reeve, 1845)
- Pterochelus undosus (Vokes, 1993)
- Pterochelus webbi Petuch & Berschauer, 2018
- Pterochelus westralis (Ponder & Wilson, 1973)
