= Naquetia cumingii =

Scientific classification
- Kingdom: Animalia
- Phylum: Mollusca
- Class: Gastropoda
- Subclass: Caenogastropoda
- Order: Neogastropoda
- Family: Muricidae
- Genus: Naquetia
- Species: N. cumingii

Binomial name
- Naquetia cumingii (A. Adams, 1853)

Synonyms
- Murex (Chicoreus) triqueter var. amanuensis Couturier, 1907; Murex cumingii A. Adams, 1853; Murex jickelii Tapparone-Canefri, 1875; Murex jickelii Tapparone-Canefri, 1875; Murex trigonulus Lamarck, 1822

Species of gastropod

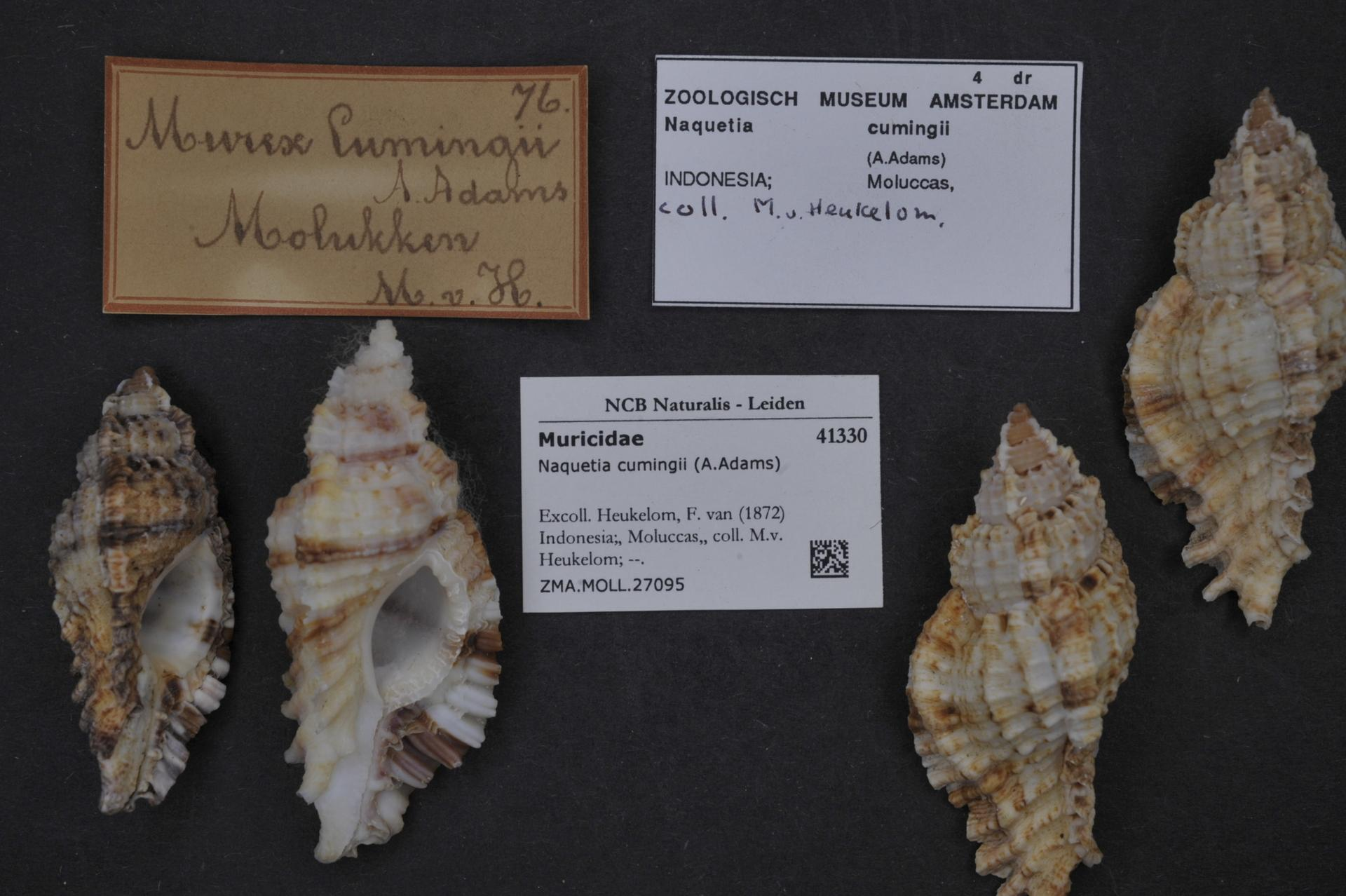
Naquetia cumingii shells in a collection

Naquetia cumingii is a species of sea snail, a marine gastropod mollusk in the family Muricidae, the murex snails or rock snails.
