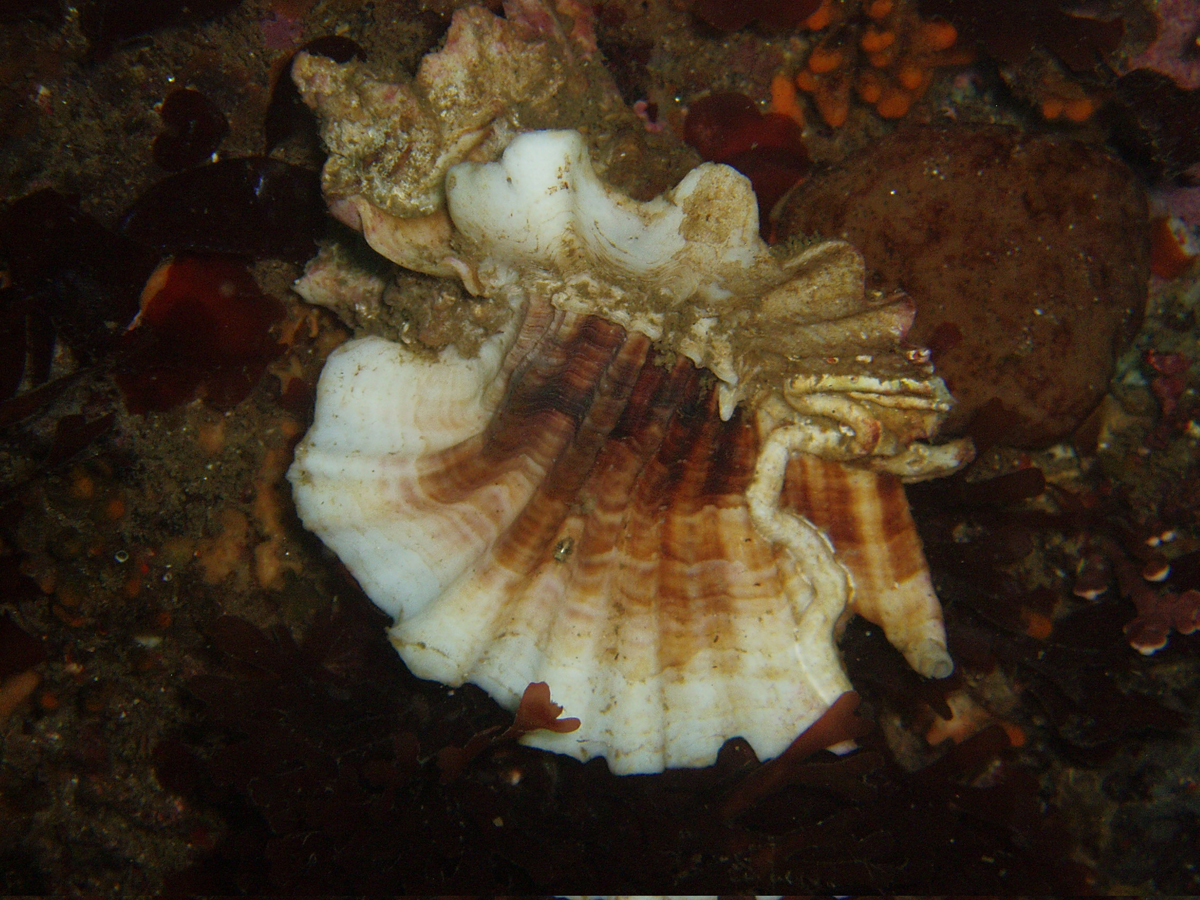
- A live individual of Ceratostoma foliatum, in situ on a rock

Scientific classification
- Kingdom: Animalia
- Phylum: Mollusca
- Class: Gastropoda
- Subclass: Caenogastropoda
- Order: Neogastropoda
- Superfamily: Muricoidea
- Family: Muricidae
- Subfamily: Ocenebrinae
- Genus: Ceratostoma; Herrmannsen, 1846

Synonyms
- Cerostoma Conrad, 1837 (invalid: junior homonym of Cerostoma Latreille, 1802 [Lepidoptera]; Ceratostoma is an emendation ); Microrhytis Emerson, 1959; Pteropurpura (Ceratostoma) Herrmannsen, 1846; Spinostoma Coen, 1943

= Ceratostoma =

Genus of gastropods

Ceratostoma, common name the "hornmouth" snails, is a genus of medium to large predatory sea snails, marine gastropod mollusks in the family Muricidae, the rock snails.

This genus should not be confused with the nudibranch genus Ceratosoma, meaning "thorn body". Ceratostoma means "thorn mouth" because of the thornlike projection on the edge of the aperture, used as a tool in predation to prop open the shells of bivalves and barnacles.

== Species ==
Species within the genus Ceratostoma include:

- Ceratostoma burnetti (Adams & Reeve, 1849)
- Ceratostoma foliatum (Gmelin, 1791)
- Ceratostoma fournieri (Crosse, 1861)
- Ceratostoma monoceros (G. B. Sowerby II, 1841)
- Ceratostoma nuttalli Conrad, 1837
- Ceratostoma rorifluum (Adams & Reeve, 1849)

Species brought into synonymy:

- Ceratostoma inornatum (Récluz, 1851) accepted as Pteropurpura (Ocinebrellus) inornata (Récluz, 1851) accepted as Ocenebra inornata (Récluz, 1851)
- Ceratostoma varicosum (Kuroda, 1953) accepted as Genkaimurex varicosus (Kuroda, 1953)
