= Pterynotus martinetana =

Scientific classification
- Kingdom: Animalia
- Phylum: Mollusca
- Class: Gastropoda
- Subclass: Caenogastropoda
- Order: Neogastropoda
- Family: Muricidae
- Genus: Pterynotus
- Species: P. martinetana

Binomial name
- Pterynotus martinetana (Röding, 1798)

Synonyms
- List: Murex fenestella Schröter, 1805; Murex fenestratus Dillwyn, L.W., 1817; Pterymarchia martinetana (Roding, 1798); Pterynotus (Pterymarchia) martinetanus (Röding, 1798); Purpura martinetana Röding, 1798

Species of gastropod

Pterynotus martinetana, commonly known as fenestrate murex, is a species of sea snail, a marine gastropod mollusk in the family Muricidae, the murex snails or rock snails.

== Description ==
The size of an adult shell varies between 18 mm and 55 mm.

== Distribution ==
This wide-ranging species is found in the Red Sea -and in the Pacific Ocean in the Philippines, in Hawaii and the Ryukyus, Japan.
