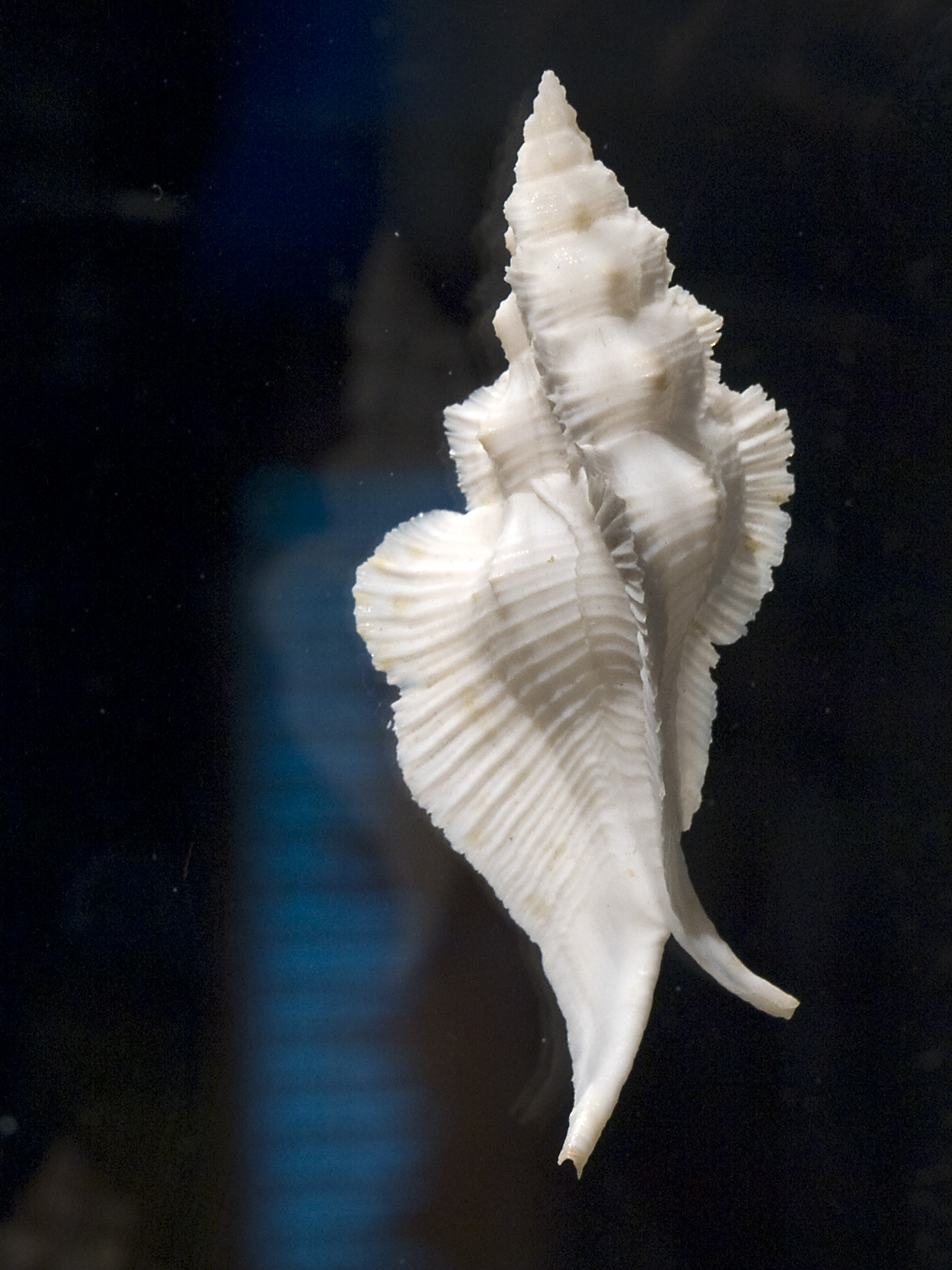
- Shell of Pterynotus alatus

Scientific classification
- Kingdom: Animalia
- Phylum: Mollusca
- Class: Gastropoda
- Subclass: Caenogastropoda
- Order: Neogastropoda
- Family: Muricidae
- Genus: Pterynotus
- Species: P. alatus

Binomial name
- Pterynotus alatus (Röding, 1798)

Synonyms
- Murex martinianus Pfeiffer, 1840; Murex pinnatus Swainson, 1822; Pterynotus pinnatus (Swainson, 1822); Purpura alata Röding, 1798

= Pterynotus alatus =

Species of gastropod

Pterynotus alatus is a species of sea snail, a marine gastropod mollusk in the family Muricidae, the murex snails or rock snails.
