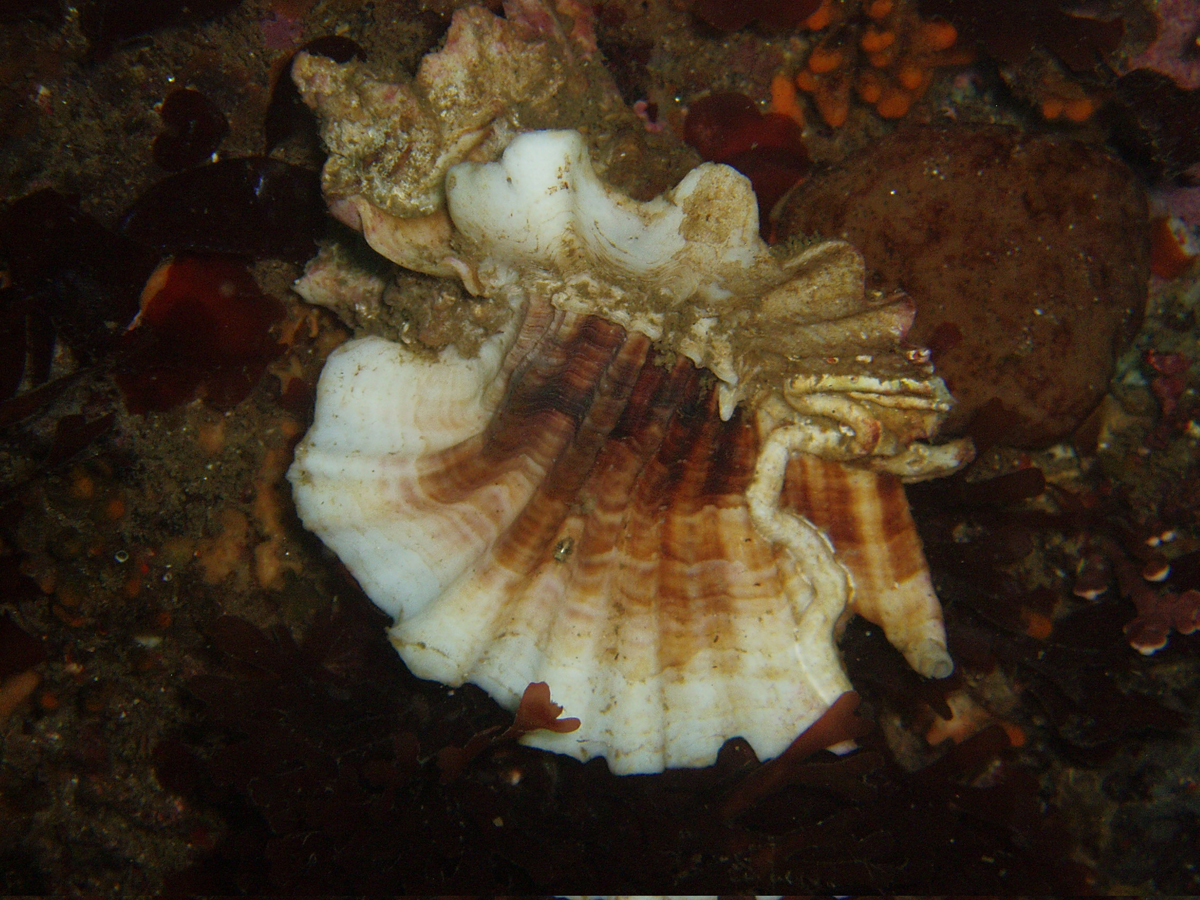
- Ceratostoma foliatum

Scientific classification
- Kingdom: Animalia
- Phylum: Mollusca
- Class: Gastropoda
- Subclass: Caenogastropoda
- Order: Neogastropoda
- Family: Muricidae
- Genus: Ceratostoma
- Species: C. foliatum

Binomial name
- Ceratostoma foliatum (Gmelin, 1791)

Synonyms
- Murex foliatus Gmelin, 1791; Murex monodon Eschscholtz, 1829; Purpura alata Schumacher, 1817

= Ceratostoma foliatum =

Species of gastropod

Ceratostoma foliatum, or leafy hornmouth is a species of medium to large sea snail, a marine gastropod mollusk in the family Muricidae, the rock snails.

== Distribution ==
This species lives in the Eastern Pacific. Known from California, West coast of North America.
