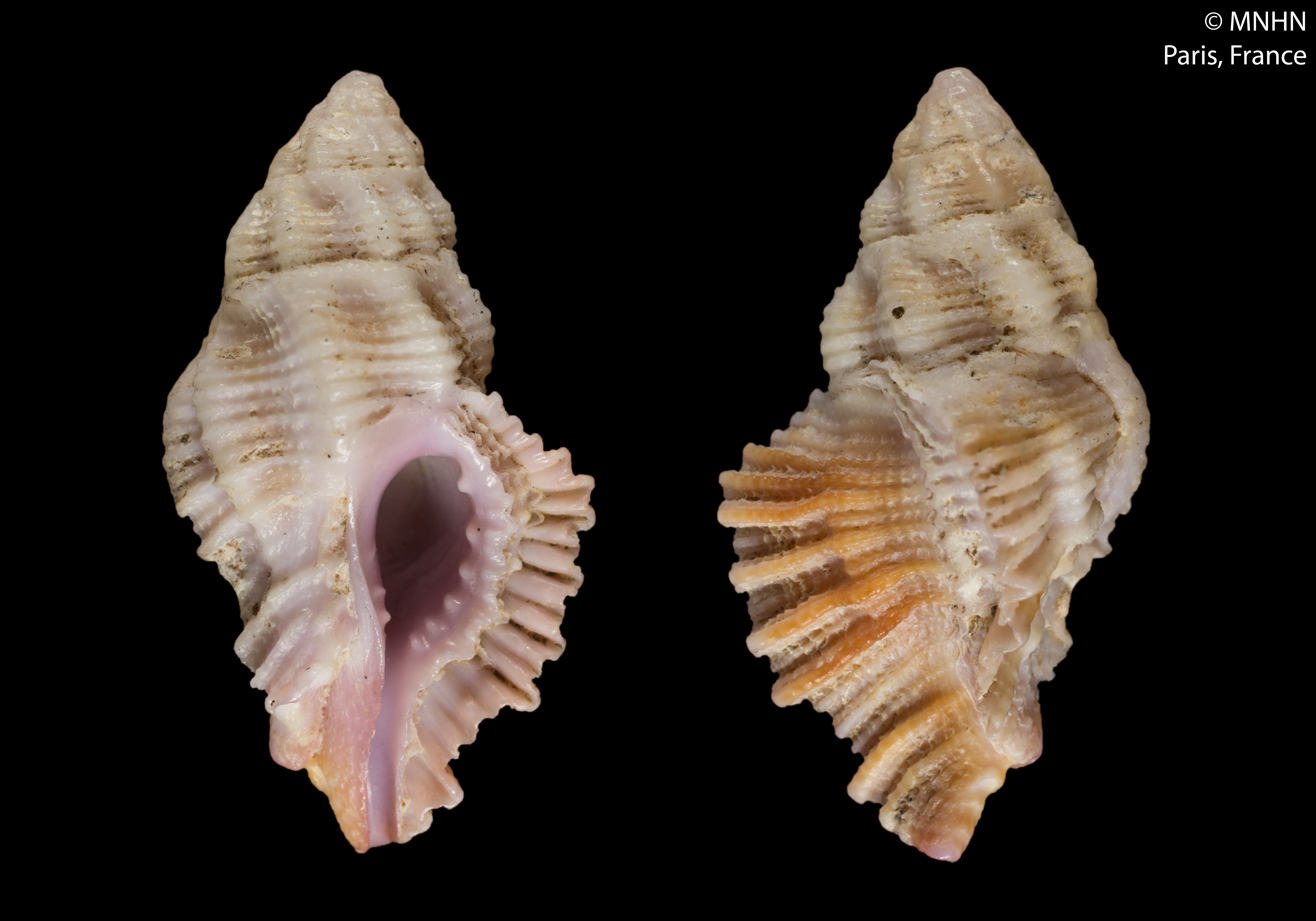
- Shell (syntype at MNHN, Paris)

Scientific classification
- Kingdom: Animalia
- Phylum: Mollusca
- Class: Gastropoda
- Subclass: Caenogastropoda
- Order: Neogastropoda
- Family: Muricidae
- Genus: Pterynotus
- Species: P. barclayanus

Binomial name
- Pterynotus barclayanus (H. Adams, 1875)

Synonyms
- List: Coralliophila barclayana H. Adams, 1873; Marchia barclayana (H. Adams, 1873); Murex alocatus Robillard, 1873; Murex lienardi Crosse, 1873; Pterymarchia barclayana (H. Adams, 1873); Pterynotus (Pterymarchia) barclayanus (H. Adams, 1873); Pterynotus purpureus Azuma, 1976

= Pterynotus barclayanus =

Species of gastropod

Pterynotus barclayanus is a species of sea snail in the family Muricidae, the murex or rock snails.

== Description ==
This marine species attains a length of 25 mm.

== Distribution ==
This marine species occurs in the Indian Ocean off Mauritius.
