= Pterynotus elaticus =

Scientific classification
- Kingdom: Animalia
- Phylum: Mollusca
- Class: Gastropoda
- Subclass: Caenogastropoda
- Order: Neogastropoda
- Family: Muricidae
- Genus: Pterynotus
- Species: P. elaticus

Binomial name
- Pterynotus elaticus (Houart, 2000)

Synonyms
- Pterymarchia elatica Houart, 2000; Pterynotus (Pterymarchia) elaticus (Houart, 2000)

Species of gastropod

Pterynotus elaticus is a species of sea snail, a marine gastropod mollusk in the family Muricidae, the murex snails or rock snails.
