= Pterynotus tripterus =

Scientific classification
- Kingdom: Animalia
- Phylum: Mollusca
- Class: Gastropoda
- Subclass: Caenogastropoda
- Order: Neogastropoda
- Family: Muricidae
- Genus: Pterynotus
- Species: P. tripterus

Binomial name
- Pterynotus tripterus (Born, 1778)

Synonyms
- Murex tripterus Born, 1778; Pterymarchia triptera (Born, 1778); Pterynotus (Pterymarchia) tripterus (Born, 1778)

Species of gastropod

Pterynotus tripterus, commonly known as the three-winged murex, is a species of sea snail, a marine gastropod mollusk in the family Muricidae, the murex snails or rock snails.

== Description ==
The shell size varies between 40 mm and 60 mm

== Distribution ==
This species is distributed in the Red Sea and in the western Pacific Ocean.
