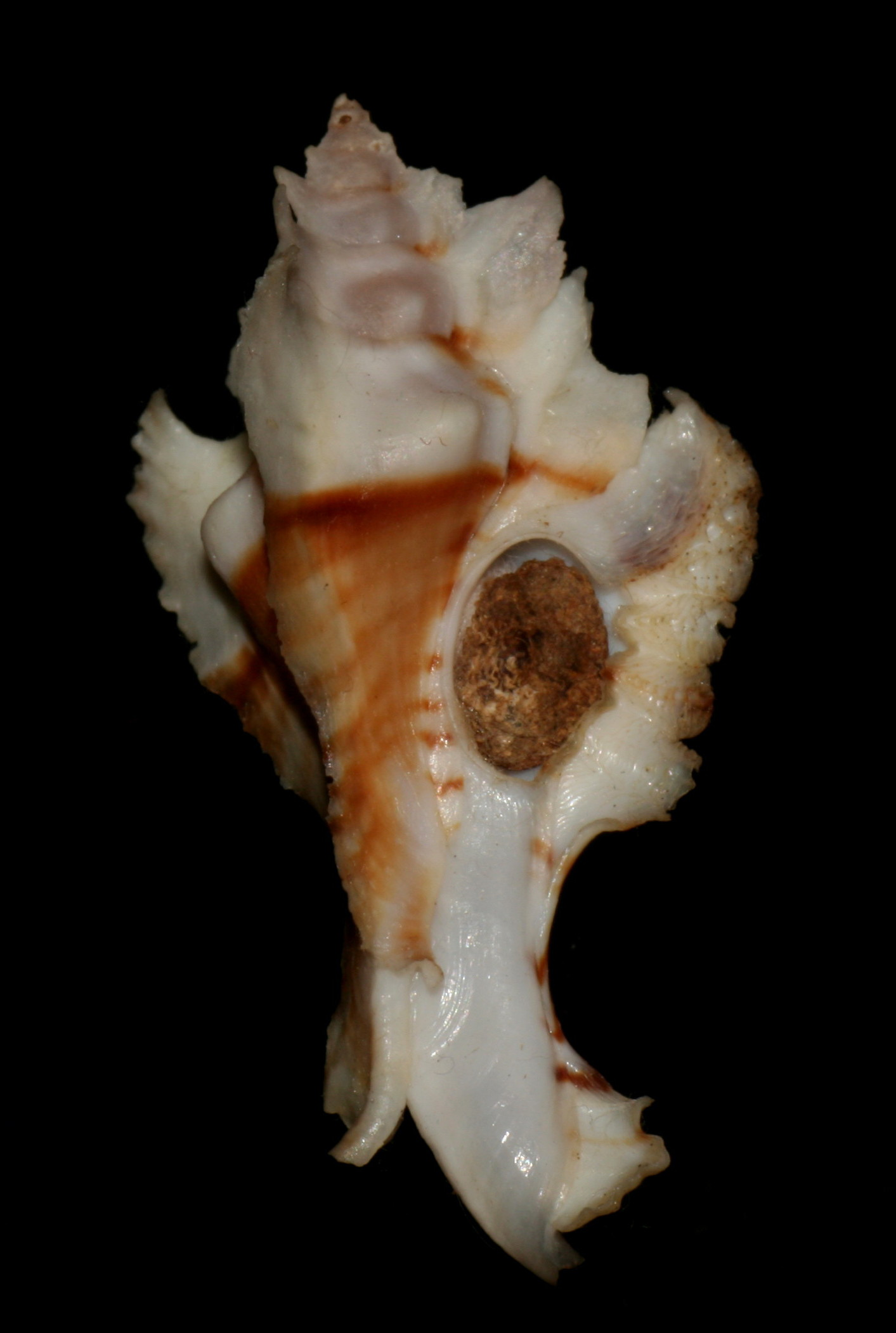
- Purpurellus pinniger

Scientific classification
- Kingdom: Animalia
- Phylum: Mollusca
- Class: Gastropoda
- Subclass: Caenogastropoda
- Order: Neogastropoda
- Family: Muricidae
- Subfamily: Muricinae
- Genus: Purpurellus; Jousseaume, 1880

= Purpurellus =

Genus of gastropods

Purpurellus is a genus of sea snails, marine gastropod mollusks in the family Muricidae, the murex snails or rock snails.

== Species ==
Species within the genus Purpurellus include:

- Purpurellus gambiensis (Reeve, 1845)
- Purpurellus macleani (Emerson & D'Attilio, 1969)
- Purpurellus pinniger (Broderip, 1833)
