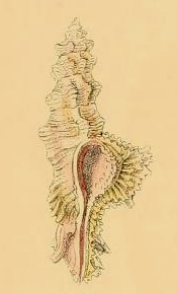
- Drawing of a shell of Pterynotus bipinnatus (holotype)

Scientific classification
- Kingdom: Animalia
- Phylum: Mollusca
- Class: Gastropoda
- Subclass: Caenogastropoda
- Order: Neogastropoda
- Family: Muricidae
- Genus: Pterynotus
- Species: P. bipinnatus

Binomial name
- Pterynotus bipinnatus (Reeve, 1845)

Synonyms
- Murex bipinnatus Reeve, 1845 (original combination); Pterymarchia bipinnata (Reeve, 1845); Pterynotus (Pterymarchia) bipinnatus (Reeve, 1845)

= Pterynotus bipinnatus =

Species of gastropod

Pterynotus bipinnatus, commonly known as two-winged murex, is a species of sea snail, a marine gastropod mollusk in the family Muricidae, the murex snails or rock snails.

== Description ==
The shell is elongately fusiform. The spire is acuminately turreted. The seven whorls are transversely delicately ridged and elevately striated. The ridges striae and interstices are very finely scabrously crenulated, first six whorls tuberculously noduled, the body whorl three-varicose with the last two varices very beautifully fimbriately winged. The shell is snowy white, tinged -with rose. The columella is pale rose. The aperture is small. The edge of the outer lip is minutely denticulated. The siphonal canal is rather broad and a little elongated.

The shell shows the peculiarity of there being no appearance of frill structure except upon the last two varices. The spire exhibits a mass of prominent nodules, each whorl taking the form of a heptagon with as many as seven on its circumference.

== Distribution ==
Queensland, Australia.
