= Naquetia annandalei =

Scientific classification
- Kingdom: Animalia
- Phylum: Mollusca
- Class: Gastropoda
- Subclass: Caenogastropoda
- Order: Neogastropoda
- Family: Muricidae
- Genus: Naquetia
- Species: N. annandalei

Binomial name
- Naquetia annandalei (Preston, 1910)

Synonyms
- Chicoreus (Naquetia) annandalei (Preston, 1910); Chicoreus annandalei (Preston, 1910); Pteronotus annandalei Preston, 1910 (original combination)

Species of gastropod

Naquetia annandalei is a species of sea snail, a marine gastropod mollusk in the family Muricidae, the murex snails or rock snails.

== Description ==
The species attains a size of 100 mm.

== Distribution ==
This marine species occurs in the Bay of Bengal; off Vietnam; the Philippine Islands; Taiwan; South Japan; Queensland, Australia; and the Marquesas.
