= Pterynotus pellucidus =

Scientific classification
- Kingdom: Animalia
- Phylum: Mollusca
- Class: Gastropoda
- Subclass: Caenogastropoda
- Order: Neogastropoda
- Family: Muricidae
- Genus: Pterynotus
- Species: P. pellucidus

Binomial name
- Pterynotus pellucidus (Reeve, 1845)

Synonyms
- Marchia pellucida Reeve, 1845; Murex pellucidus Reeve, 1845

Species of gastropod

Pterynotus pellucidus is a species of sea snail, a marine gastropod mollusk in the family Muricidae, the murex snails or rock snails.
