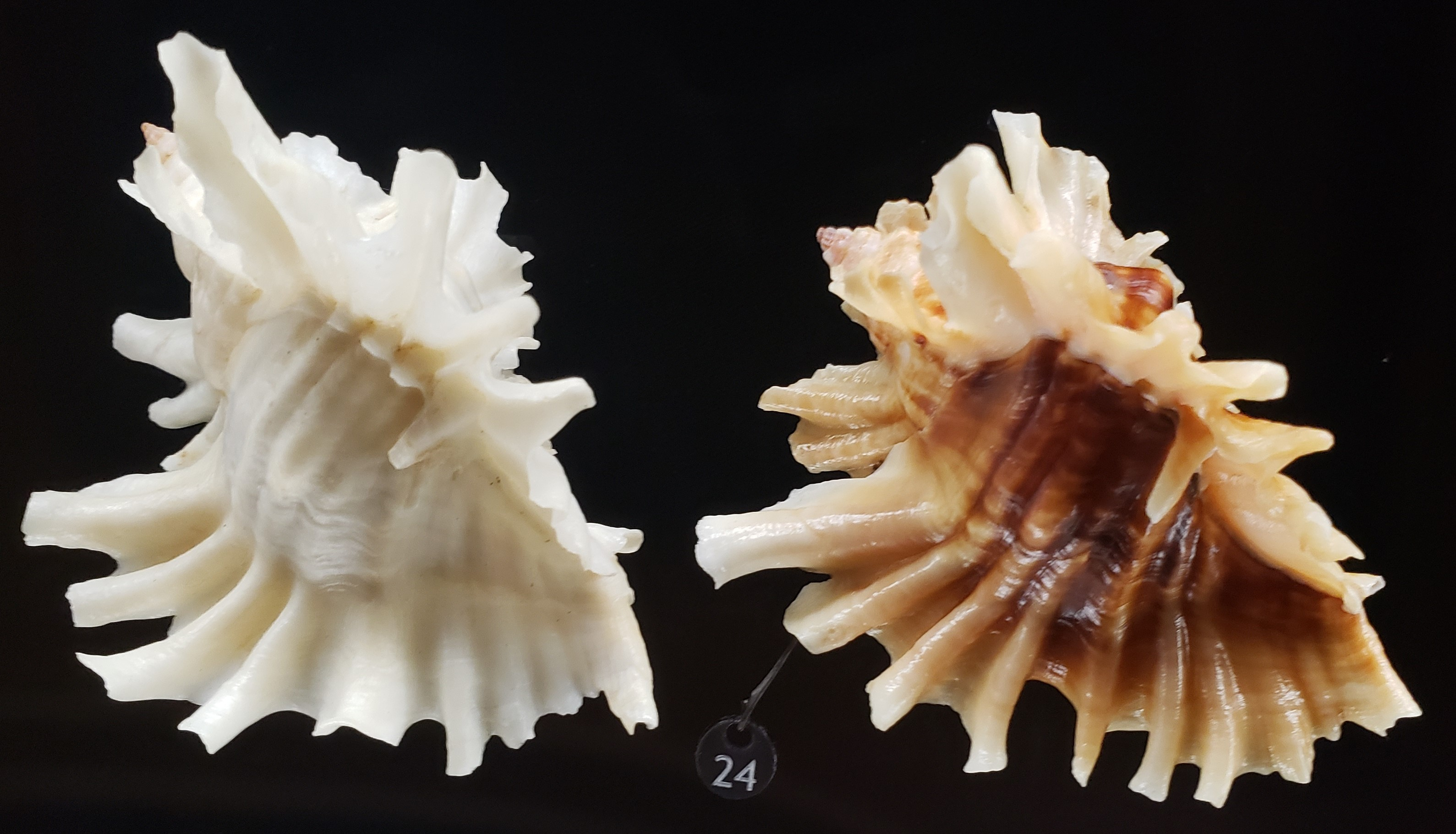
- Natural colored Ceratostoma burnetti shell alongside albino variant

Scientific classification
- Kingdom: Animalia
- Phylum: Mollusca
- Class: Gastropoda
- Subclass: Caenogastropoda
- Order: Neogastropoda
- Family: Muricidae
- Genus: Ceratostoma
- Species: C. burnettii

Binomial name
- Ceratostoma burnettii (Adams & Reeve, 1849)

Synonyms
- Cerastoma burnettii (Reeve, 1849); Murex burnetti Adams & Reeve, 1849; Murex coreanicum A. Adams, 1854; Pterynotus gouldi A. Adams, 1863

= Ceratostoma burnettii =

Species of gastropod

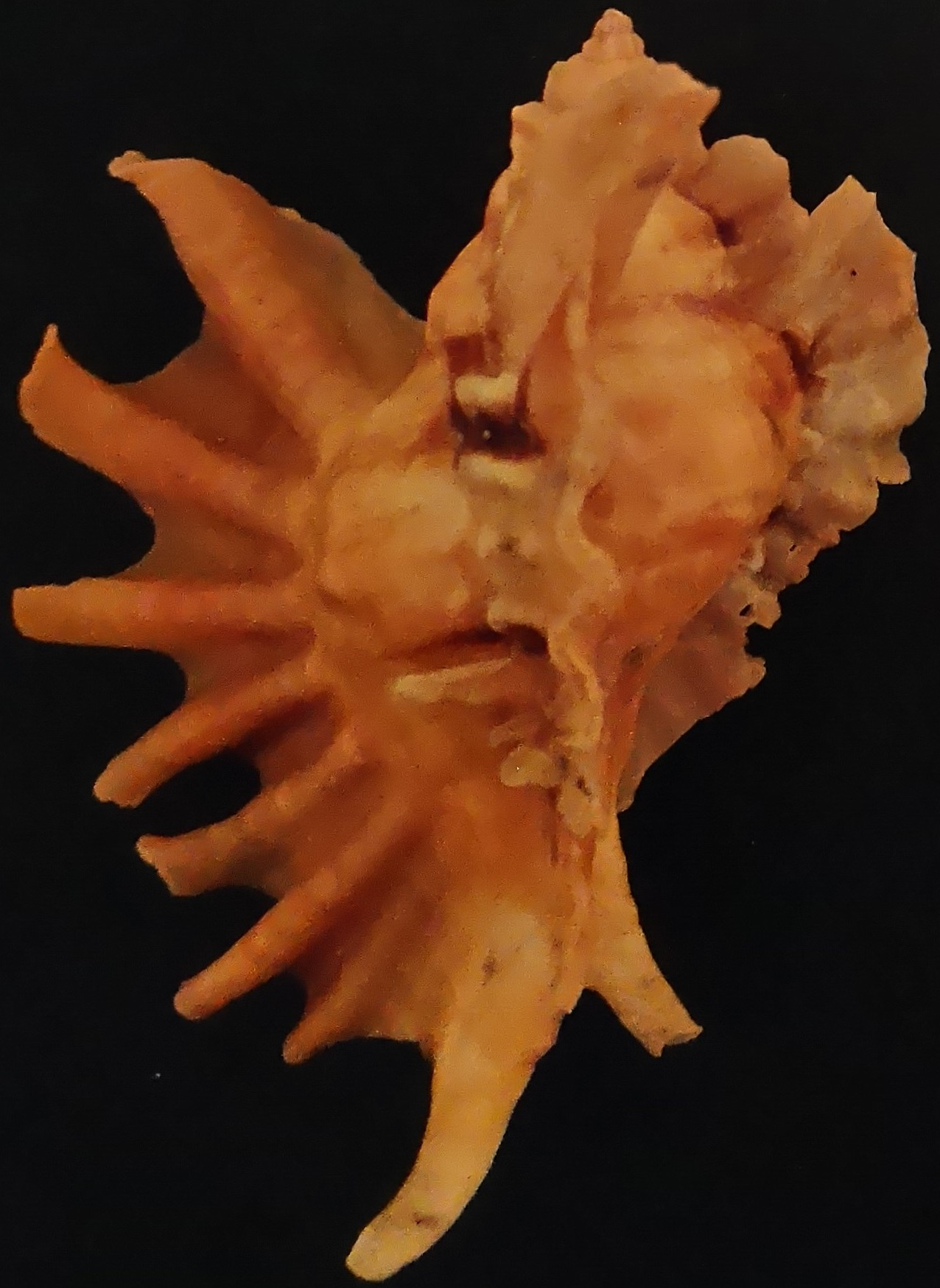

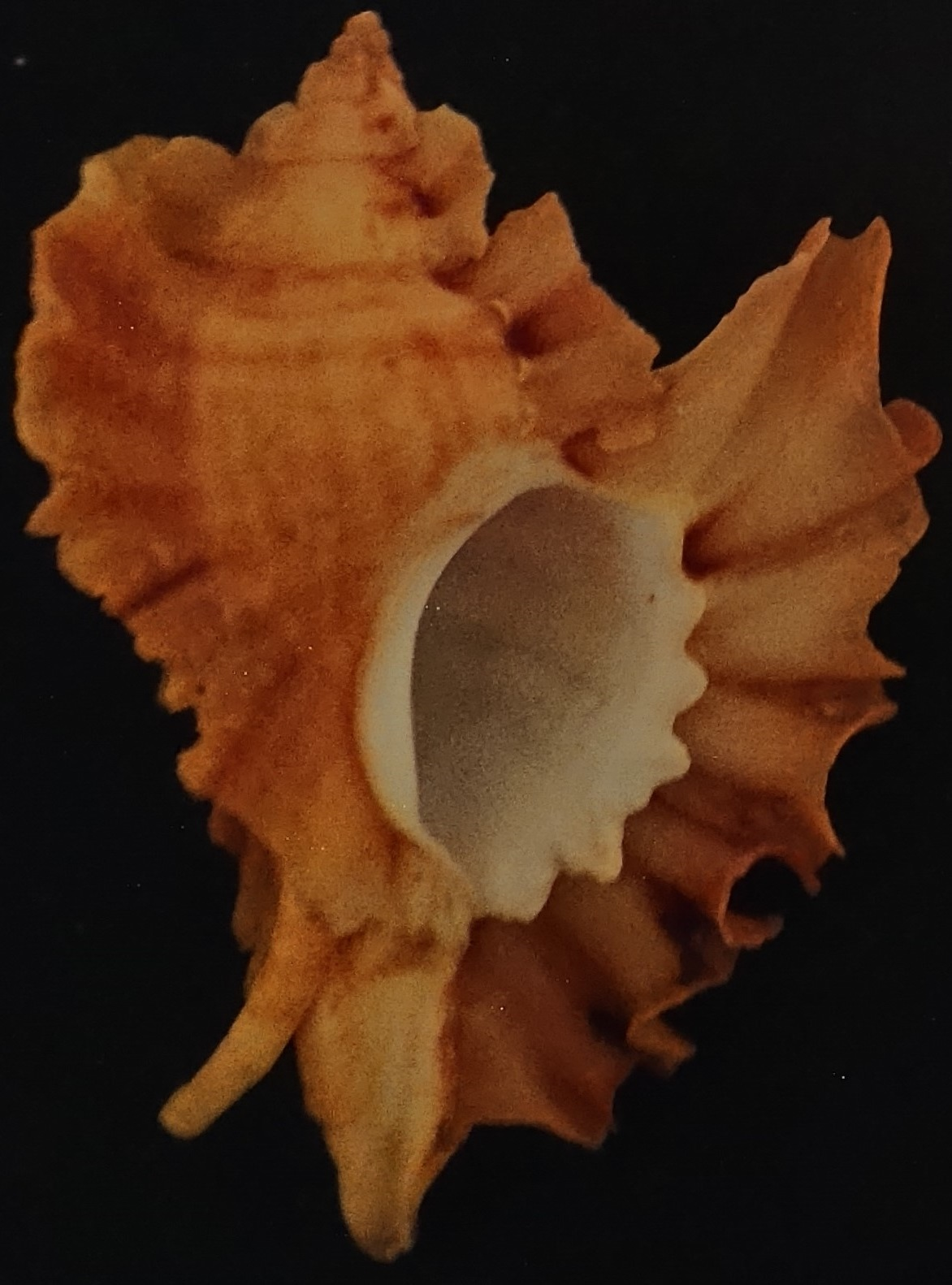

Ceratostoma burnetti or Burnett's Murex is a species of sea snail, a marine gastropod mollusk in the family Muricidae, the murex snails or rock snails.

== Description ==
The length of the snails shell varies from 9 to 12 centimeters. The shell body whorl is a rich uniform brown, with pale ribbed varices that extend from the main body of the shell.

== Distribution ==
This marine species occurs primarily off South Korea. However species have been found in a much larger range around the coasts of Japan, Australia and Alaska.
