= Purpurellus macleani =

Scientific classification
- Kingdom: Animalia
- Phylum: Mollusca
- Class: Gastropoda
- Subclass: Caenogastropoda
- Order: Neogastropoda
- Family: Muricidae
- Genus: Purpurellus
- Species: P. macleani

Binomial name
- Purpurellus macleani (Emerson & D'Attilio, 1969)

Synonyms
- Pterynotus macleani Emerson & D'Attilio, 1969

Species of gastropod

Purpurellus macleani is a species of sea snail, a marine gastropod mollusc in the family Muricidae, the murex snails or rock snails.
