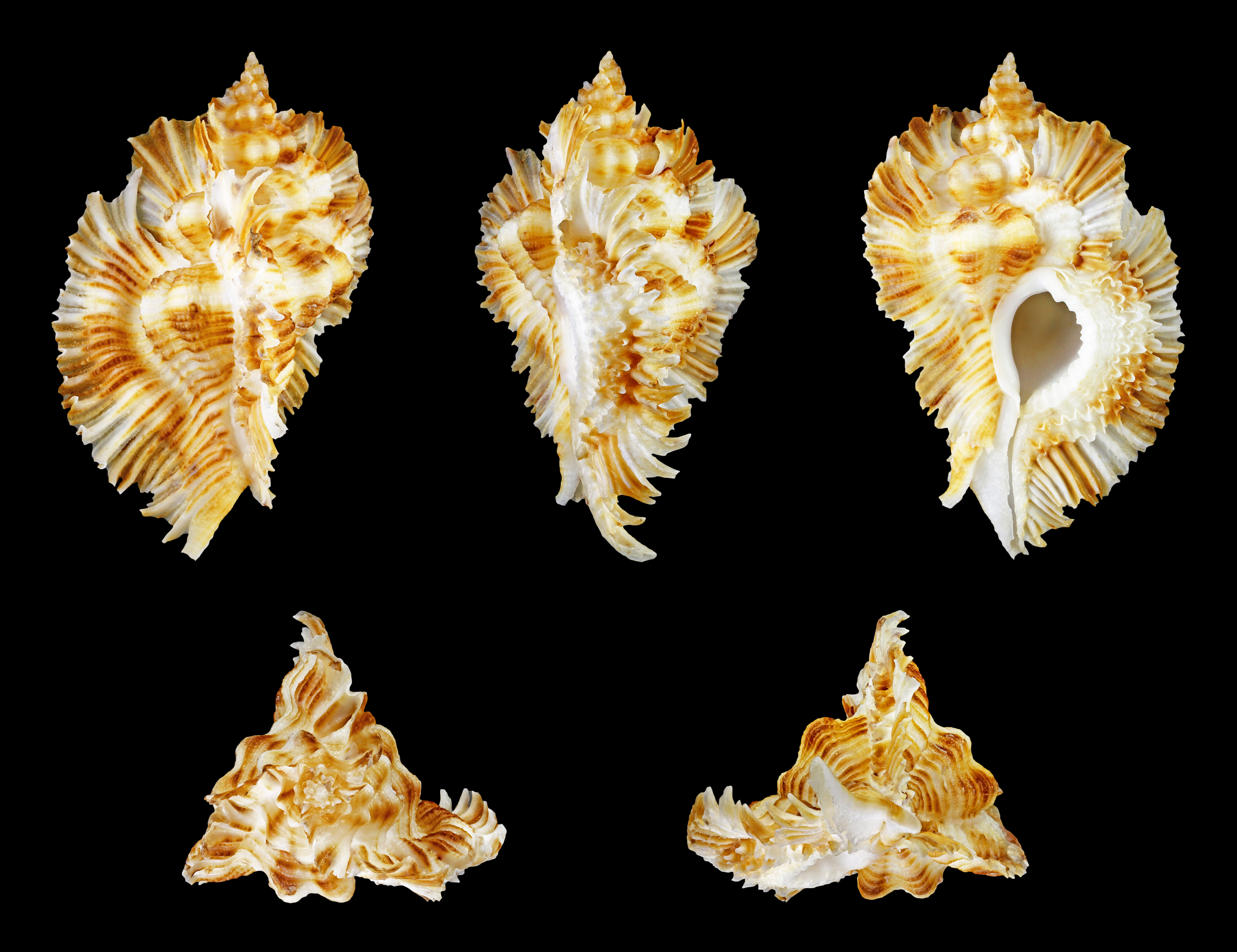

Scientific classification
- Kingdom: Animalia
- Phylum: Mollusca
- Class: Gastropoda
- Subclass: Caenogastropoda
- Order: Neogastropoda
- Family: Muricidae
- Genus: Chicoreus
- Species: C. miyokoae

Binomial name
- Chicoreus miyokoae (Kosuge, 1979)

Synonyms
- Chicoreus (Chicopinnatus) miyokoae (Kosuge, 1979) · accepted, alternate representation; Pterynotus miyokoae Kosuge, 1979; Timbellus miyokoae (Kosuge, 1979)

= Chicoreus miyokoae =

Species of gastropod

Chicoreus miyokoae, common name : the Miyoko Murex, is a species of predatory sea snail, a marine gastropod mollusk in the family Muricidae, the murex snails or rock snails.

== Description ==
The size of an adult shell varies between 45 mm and 78 mm. The species is carnivorous and predatory in its feeding behaviour.

== Distribution ==
This marine species is found in the Philippines and Fiji. It inhabits subtidal zones at depths between 80 and 361 metres, in habitats associated with coral reefs.
