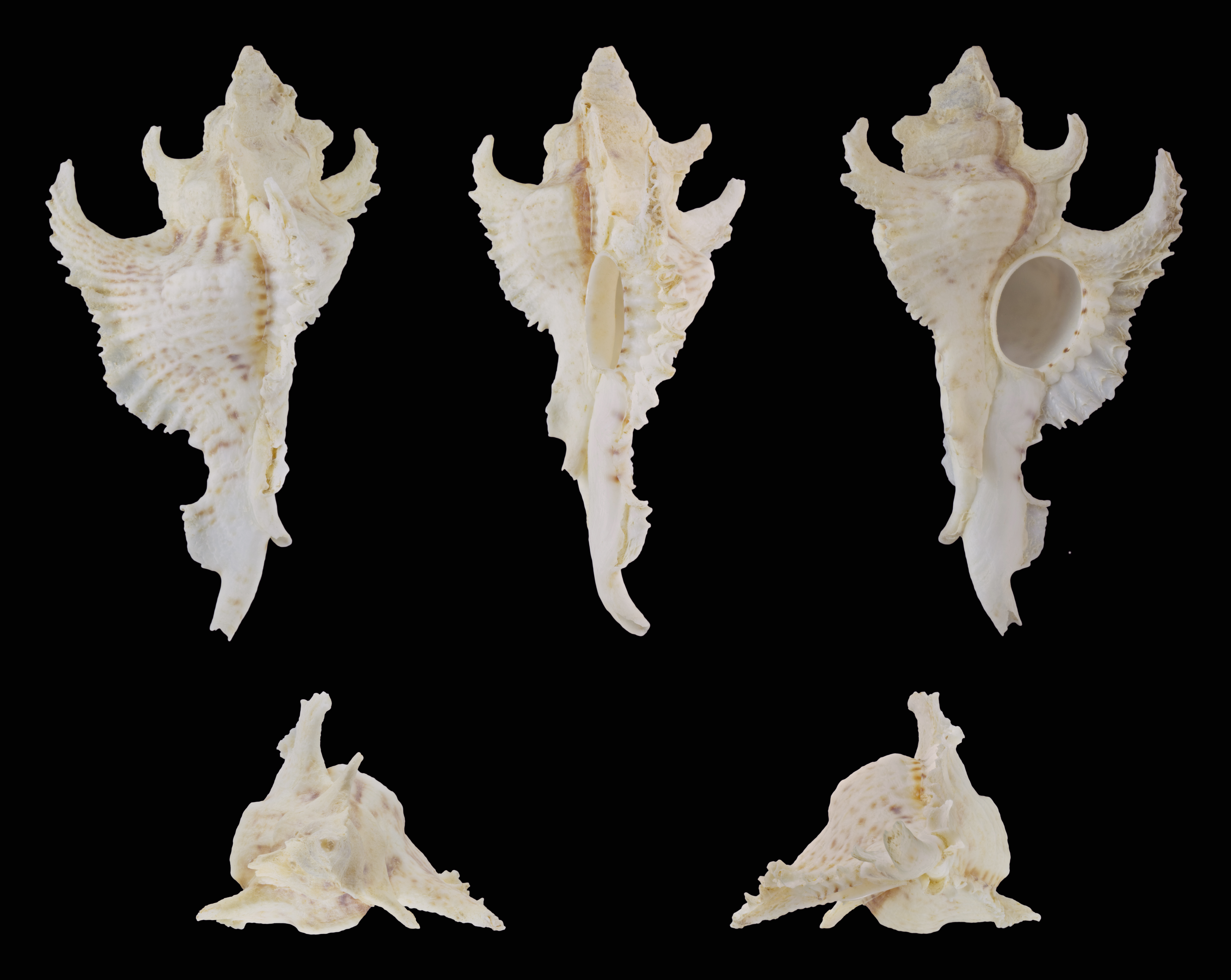

Scientific classification
- Kingdom: Animalia
- Phylum: Mollusca
- Class: Gastropoda
- Subclass: Caenogastropoda
- Order: Neogastropoda
- Family: Muricidae
- Genus: Purpurellus
- Species: P. gambiensis

Binomial name
- Purpurellus gambiensis (Reeve, 1845)

Synonyms
- Murex gambiensis Reeve, 1845; Murex osseus Reeve, L.A., 1845; Pterynotus gambiensis Reeve

= Purpurellus gambiensis =

Species of gastropod

Purpurellus gambiensis, common name : the Gambia Murex, is a species of sea snail, a marine gastropod mollusk in the family Muricidae, the murex snails or rock snails.

== Description ==
The size of an adult shell varies between 35 mm and 75 mm.

== Distribution ==
This species is distributed in the Atlantic Ocean along Senegal, Guinea and Angola.
