= Pterochelus undosus =

Scientific classification
- Kingdom: Animalia
- Phylum: Mollusca
- Class: Gastropoda
- Subclass: Caenogastropoda
- Order: Neogastropoda
- Family: Muricidae
- Genus: Pterochelus
- Species: P. undosus

Binomial name
- Pterochelus undosus (Vokes, 1993)

Synonyms
- Pterynotus (Pterochelus) undosus Vokes, 1993

Species of gastropod

Pterochelus undosus is a species of sea snail, a marine gastropod mollusk in the family Muricidae, the murex snails or rock snails.
