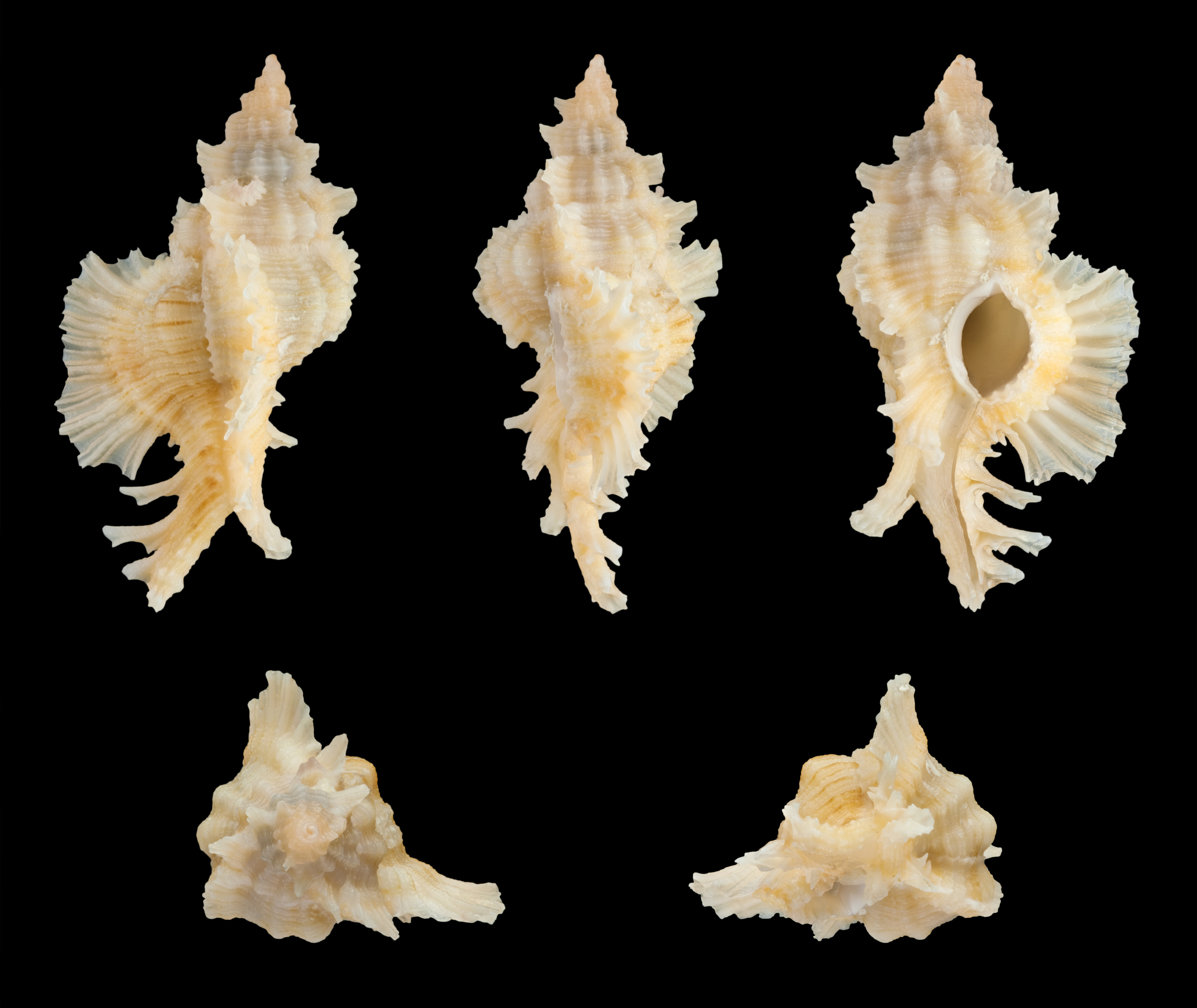
- Five views of a shell of Chicoreus orchidiflorus, 27 mm in length

Scientific classification
- Kingdom: Animalia
- Phylum: Mollusca
- Class: Gastropoda
- Subclass: Caenogastropoda
- Order: Neogastropoda
- Family: Muricidae
- Genus: Chicoreus
- Species: C. orchidiflorus

Binomial name
- Chicoreus orchidiflorus (Shikama, 1973)

Synonyms
- Chicoreus subtilis Houart, 1977; Pterynotus celinamarumai Kosuge, 1980; Pterynotus cerinamarumai Kosuge, 1980; Pterynotus orchidiflorus Shikama, 1973

= Chicoreus orchidiflorus =

Species of gastropod

Chicoreus orchidiflorus is a species of sea snail, a marine gastropod mollusk in the family Muricidae, the murex snails or rock snails.

== Description ==
This species attains a size of 38 mm.

== Distribution ==
Pacific Ocean: Philippines.
