= Timbellus phaneus =

Scientific classification
- Kingdom: Animalia
- Phylum: Mollusca
- Class: Gastropoda
- Subclass: Caenogastropoda
- Order: Neogastropoda
- Family: Muricidae
- Genus: Timbellus
- Species: T. phaneus

Binomial name
- Timbellus phaneus (Dall, 1889)

Synonyms
- Murex (Pteronotus) phaneus Dall, 1889; Murex (Pteronotus) pygmaeus Bush, 1893; Murex pygmaeus Bush, K.J., 1893; Murex tristichus Dall, W.H., 1889; Pterynotus bushae Vokes, 1970; Pterynotus (Pterynotus) bushae Vokes, E.H., 1970; Pterynotus (Pterynotus) havanensis Vokes, E.H., 1970; Pterynotus phaneus (Dall, 1889); Pteropurpura tristica Dall, W.H., 1927

Species of gastropod

Timbellus phaneus, common name: the phaneus murex, is a species of sea snail, a marine gastropod mollusk in the family Muricidae, the murex snails or rock snails.

== Description ==
The size of an adult shell varies between 7 mm and 35 mm. The early postlarval shell whorls bear three varices, or thickened axial ridges, per whorl. Adult shells have about six postlarval whorls, and their varices tend to be more rounded and less pointed than those of the similar species "Timbellus havanensis".

The shell's axial sculpture consists of numerous faint growth lines, while its spiral sculpture includes low cords and numerous fine scratches.

The raised nodes between the main shell ridges are variable. Although Dall's original description emphasized three intervening nodes, these may be absent in some specimens. Compared with ''Timbellus havanensis'', the species generally has stronger axial and spiral sculpture between the ridges, particularly on the later whorls.

== Distribution ==
This marine species is found in the Gulf of Mexico and the Caribbean Sea; in the Atlantic Ocean from South Carolina to Brazil.

The holotype was collected off St. Augustine, Florida, at a depth of 794 meters. Other illustrated specimens were dredged southwest of Key West at 274 meters and south of the Marquesas Keys at 198 meters.

== Taxonomy ==
The species was originally described as ''Murex (Pteronotus) phaneus'' by Dall in 1889 and was subsequently placed in ''Pterynotus'' before being called ''Timbellus''. ''Pterynotus bushae'', named by Vokes in 1970, is treated as a junior subjective synonym, meaning that the differently named forms are considered to represent the same species.

The holotype is catalogued in the United States National Museum collection under the number USNM 93256.

''Timbellus havanensis'' is recognized as a separate species. The name ''Murex (Pteronotus) tristichus'' Dall, 1889 is a synonym of that species; Vokes introduced the replacement name ''Pterynotus havanensis'' in 1970 because Dall's name was already occupied by ''Murex tristichus'' Beyrich, 1854.
