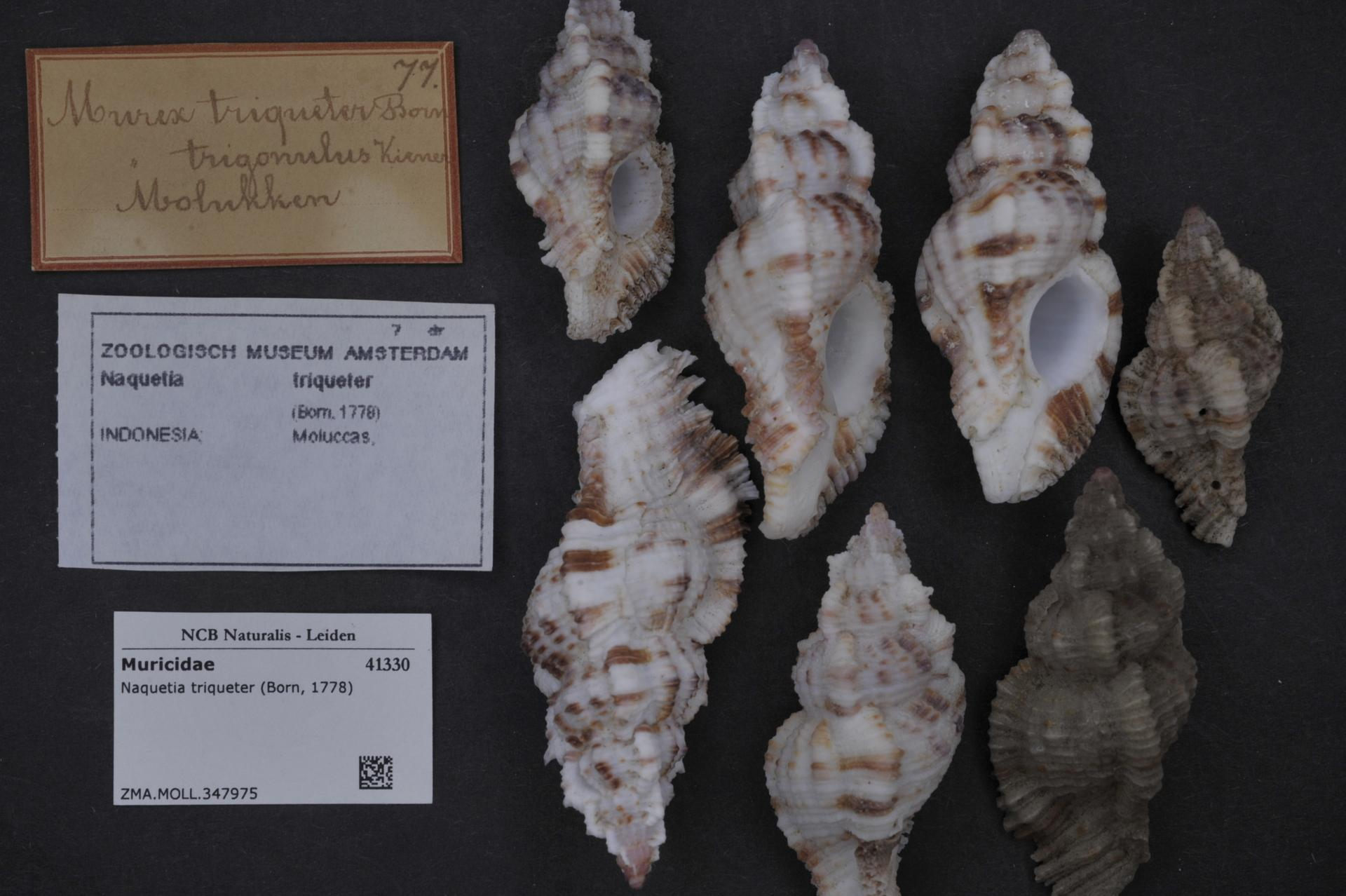

Scientific classification
- Kingdom: Animalia
- Phylum: Mollusca
- Class: Gastropoda
- Subclass: Caenogastropoda
- Order: Neogastropoda
- Family: Muricidae
- Genus: Naquetia
- Species: N. triqueter

Binomial name
- Naquetia triqueter (Born, 1778)

Synonyms
- Chicoreus (Naquetia) triqueter (Born, 1778); Chicoreus (Naquetia) triqueter vokesae Houart, 1986; Chicoreus (Triplex) flexuosus Perry, G., 1811; Murex (Chicoreus) triqueter Born, 1778; Murex roseotinctus Sowerby, 1860; Murex trigonulus Lamarck, 1816; Murex triqueter Born, 1778; Naquetia triquetra (Born, I. von, 1778); Pterynotus triquetor Born; Purpura cancellata Roding, 1798; Purpura variegata Roding, 1798; Triplex flexuosa Perry, 1811

= Naquetia triqueter =

Species of gastropod

Naquetia triqueter, common name : the three-angled murex, is a species of sea snail, a marine gastropod mollusk in the family of Muricidae, the murex snails or rock snails.

== Description ==
The shell size varies between 50 mm and 75 mm

== Distribution ==
This species is distributed in the Indian Ocean along the coasts of Madagascar, Tanzania, Chagos, the Mascarene Basin, and in the Western Pacific Ocean.
