= Pterochelus duffusi =

Scientific classification
- Kingdom: Animalia
- Phylum: Mollusca
- Class: Gastropoda
- Subclass: Caenogastropoda
- Order: Neogastropoda
- Family: Muricidae
- Genus: Pterochelus
- Species: P. duffusi

Binomial name
- Pterochelus duffusi Iredale, 1936

Synonyms
- Pterynotus (Pterochelus) phillipsi Vokes, 1966

Species of gastropod

Pterochelus duffusi is a species of sea snail, a marine gastropod mollusk in the family Muricidae.
