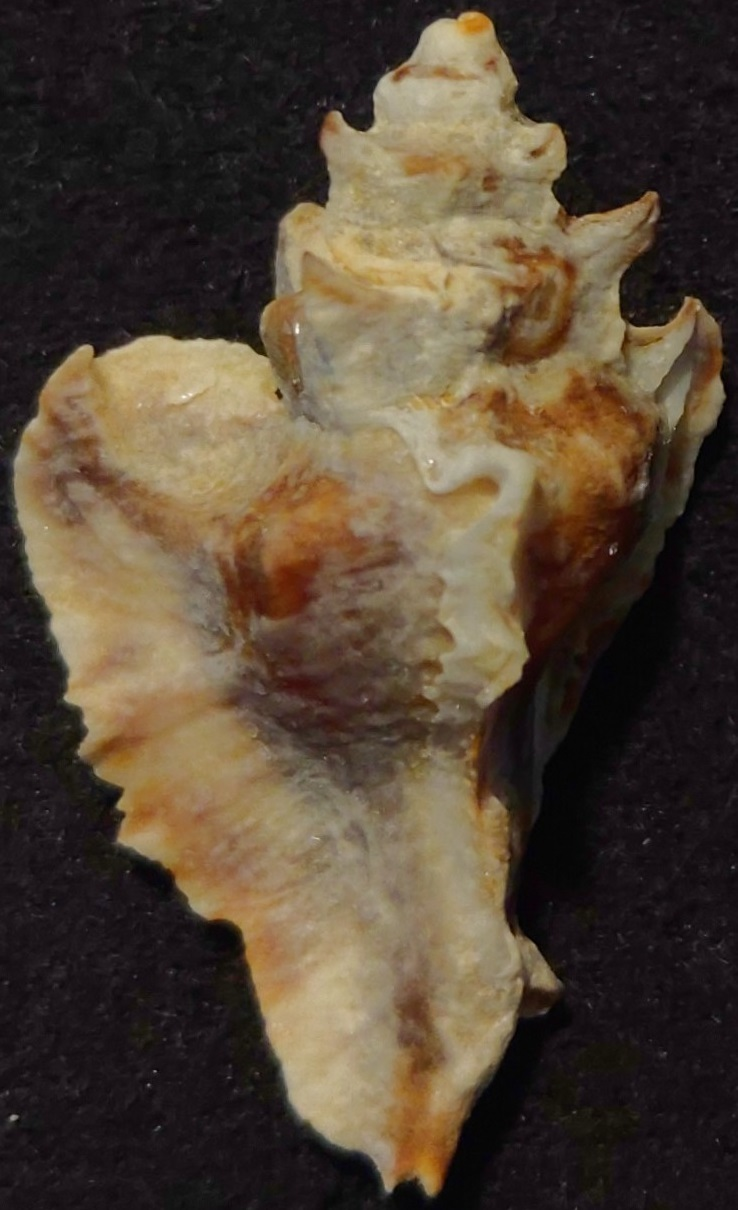

Scientific classification
- Kingdom: Animalia
- Phylum: Mollusca
- Class: Gastropoda
- Subclass: Caenogastropoda
- Order: Neogastropoda
- Family: Muricidae
- Genus: Pterochelus
- Species: P. akation

Binomial name
- Pterochelus akation (Vokes, 1993)

Synonyms
- Pterynotus (Pterochelus) akation Vokes, 1993

= Pterochelus akation =

Species of gastropod

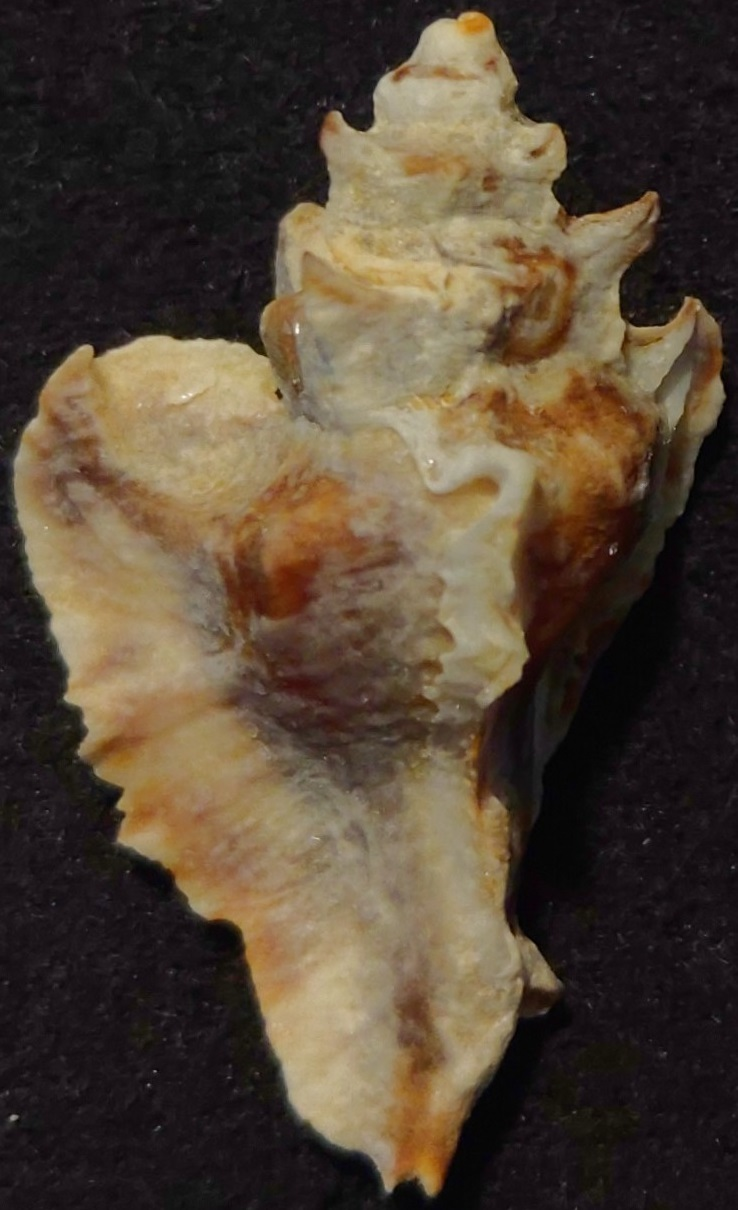

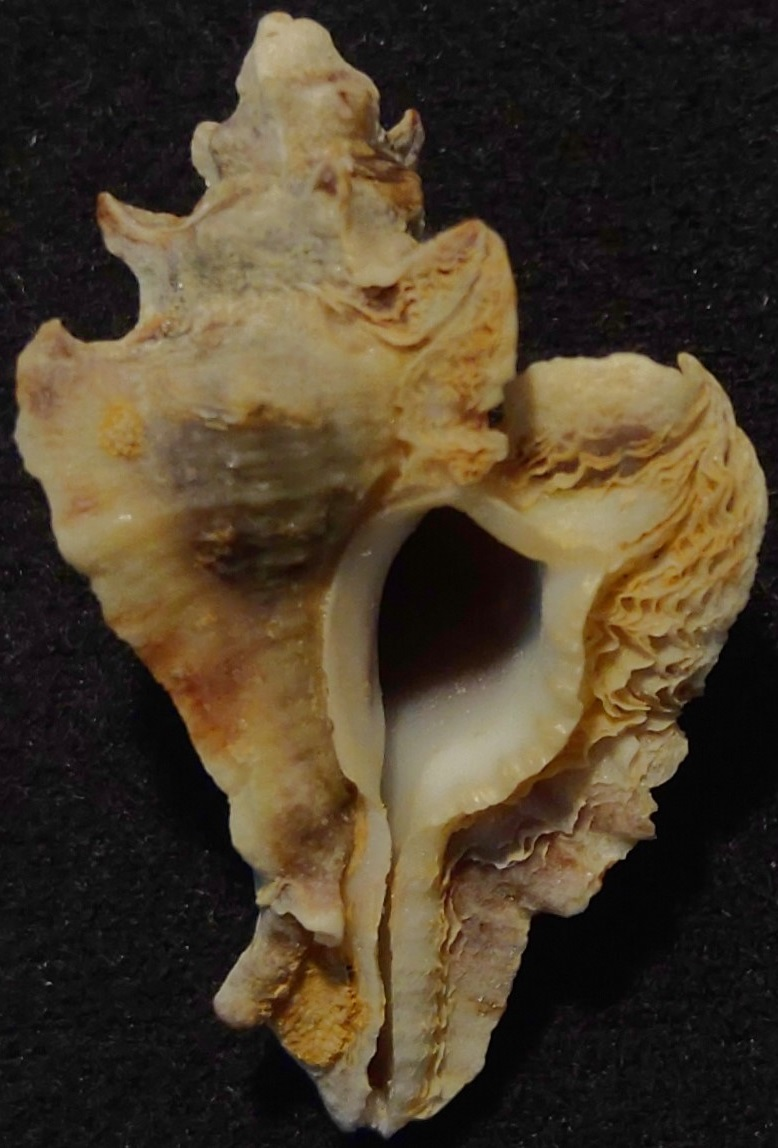

Pterochelus akation is a species of sea snail, a marine gastropod mollusk in the family Muricidae, the murex snails or rock snails.
