= Pterochelus triformis =

Scientific classification
- Kingdom: Animalia
- Phylum: Mollusca
- Class: Gastropoda
- Subclass: Caenogastropoda
- Order: Neogastropoda
- Family: Muricidae
- Genus: Pterochelus
- Species: P. triformis

Binomial name
- Pterochelus triformis (Reeve, 1845)

Synonyms
- Murex alatus Sowerby, 1834; Murex triformis Reeve, 1845

Species of gastropod

Pterochelus triformis is a species of sea snail, a marine gastropod mollusc in the family Muricidae, the murex snails or rock snails.

== Description ==
This sea snail is generally white shading to brown. The opening is shaped like an oval, with a complex series of channels extending throughout.

They are predatory, drilling holes into the shells of organisms such as clams and barnacles to feed.
