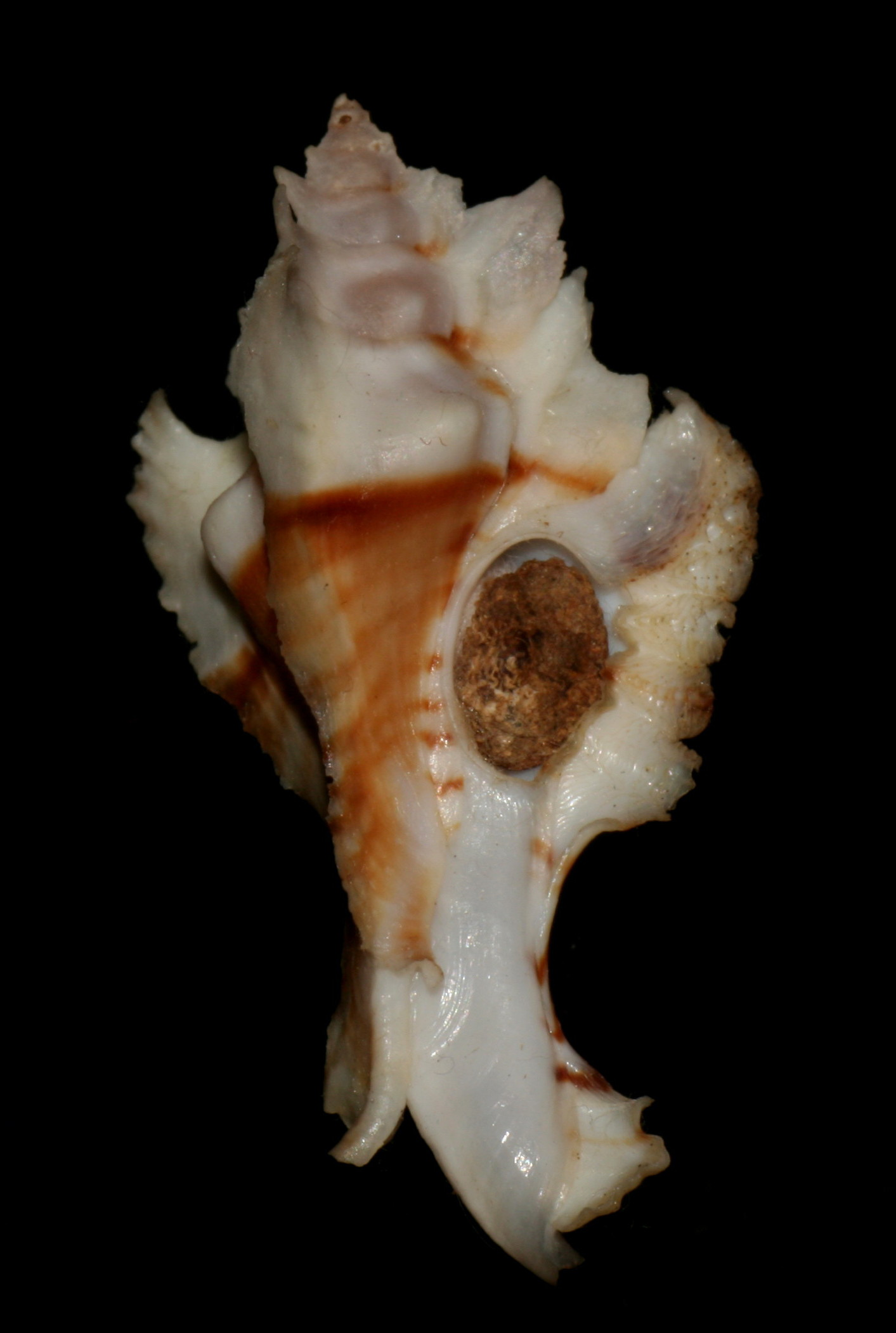
- Gastropod shell of Purpurellus pinniger with operculum, 45.6 mm in length, found at low tide in gravely sand and rocky rubble near boulders, Gobernadora Island, Panama.

Scientific classification
- Kingdom: Animalia
- Phylum: Mollusca
- Class: Gastropoda
- Subclass: Caenogastropoda
- Order: Neogastropoda
- Family: Muricidae
- Genus: Purpurellus
- Species: P. pinniger

Binomial name
- Purpurellus pinniger (Broderip, 1833)

Synonyms
- Centrifuga inezana Durham, 1950; Murex cristatus Wood, 1828; Murex osseus Reeve, 1845; Murex pinniger Broderip, 1833

= Purpurellus pinniger =

Species of gastropod

Purpurellus pinniger is a species of sea snail, a marine gastropod mollusk in the family Muricidae, the murex snails or rock snails.

== Description ==
The shell is bright white and glossy with irregular bands of brown. There are three strong varices bearing an irregular fluted or wavy edge, and a sharply incurved spine on the varix of later whorls. The early whorls can appear translucent and show a brownish blue color beneath. The varix on the outer lip ends well above the siphonal canal, which is curved, and ends in a wavy flattened edge similar to the varices in shape. The aperture is subovate and the operculum is dark brown. Length 50 mm, width 25 mm.

== Distribution ==
This species is found subtidally along the coast of Central America from San Marcos Island and Guaymas to Ecuador in water as deep as 82 m.
