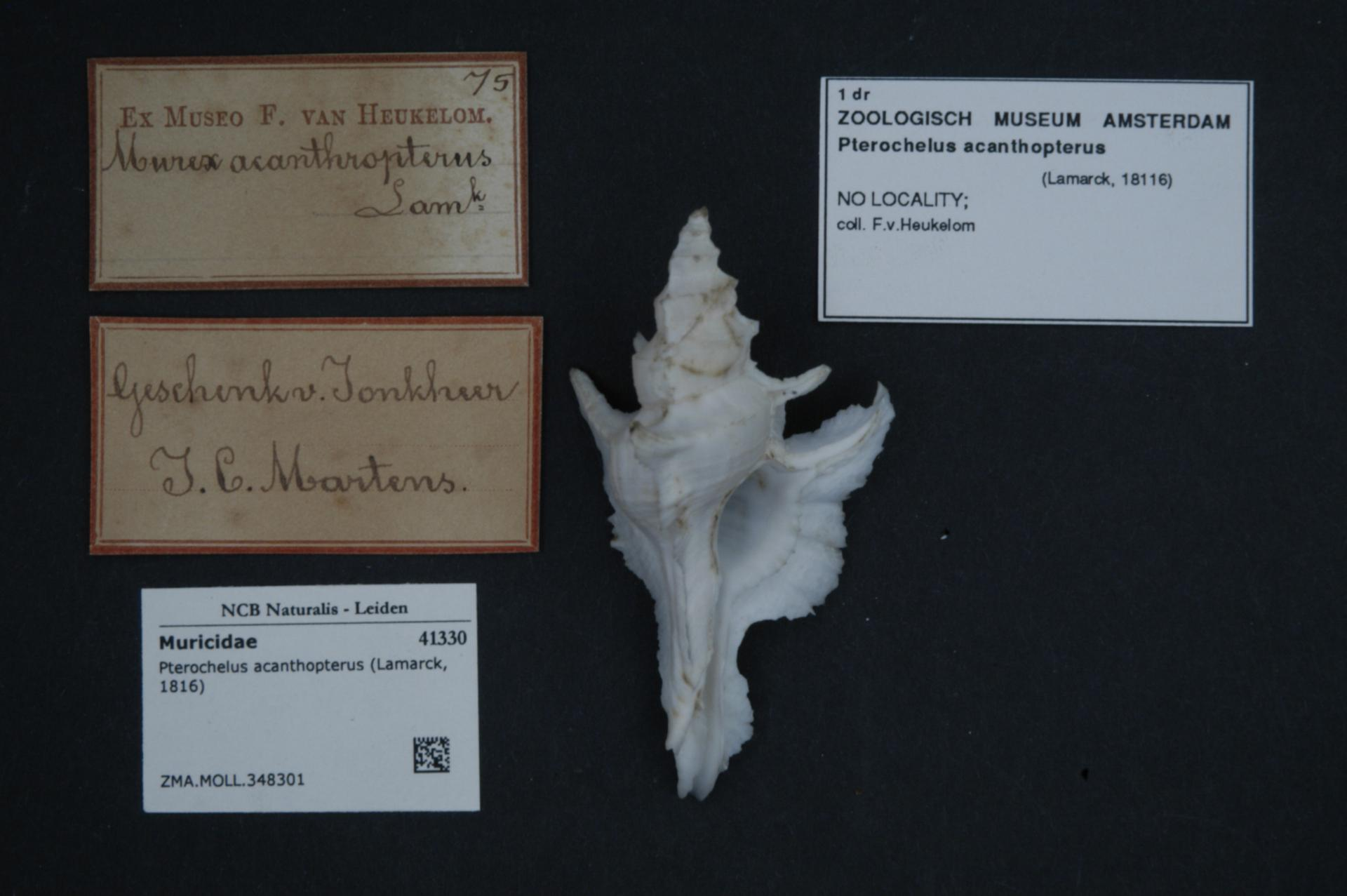

Scientific classification
- Kingdom: Animalia
- Phylum: Mollusca
- Class: Gastropoda
- Subclass: Caenogastropoda
- Order: Neogastropoda
- Family: Muricidae
- Genus: Pterochelus
- Species: P. acanthopterus

Binomial name
- Pterochelus acanthopterus (Lamarck, 1816)

Synonyms
- Murex acanthopterus Lamarck, 1816; Murex alatus Fischer von Waldheim, 1807; Murex saibaiensis Melvill & Standen, 1899

= Pterochelus acanthopterus =

Species of gastropod

Pterochelus acanthopterus is a species of sea snail, a marine gastropod mollusk in the family Muricidae, the murex snails or rock snails.
