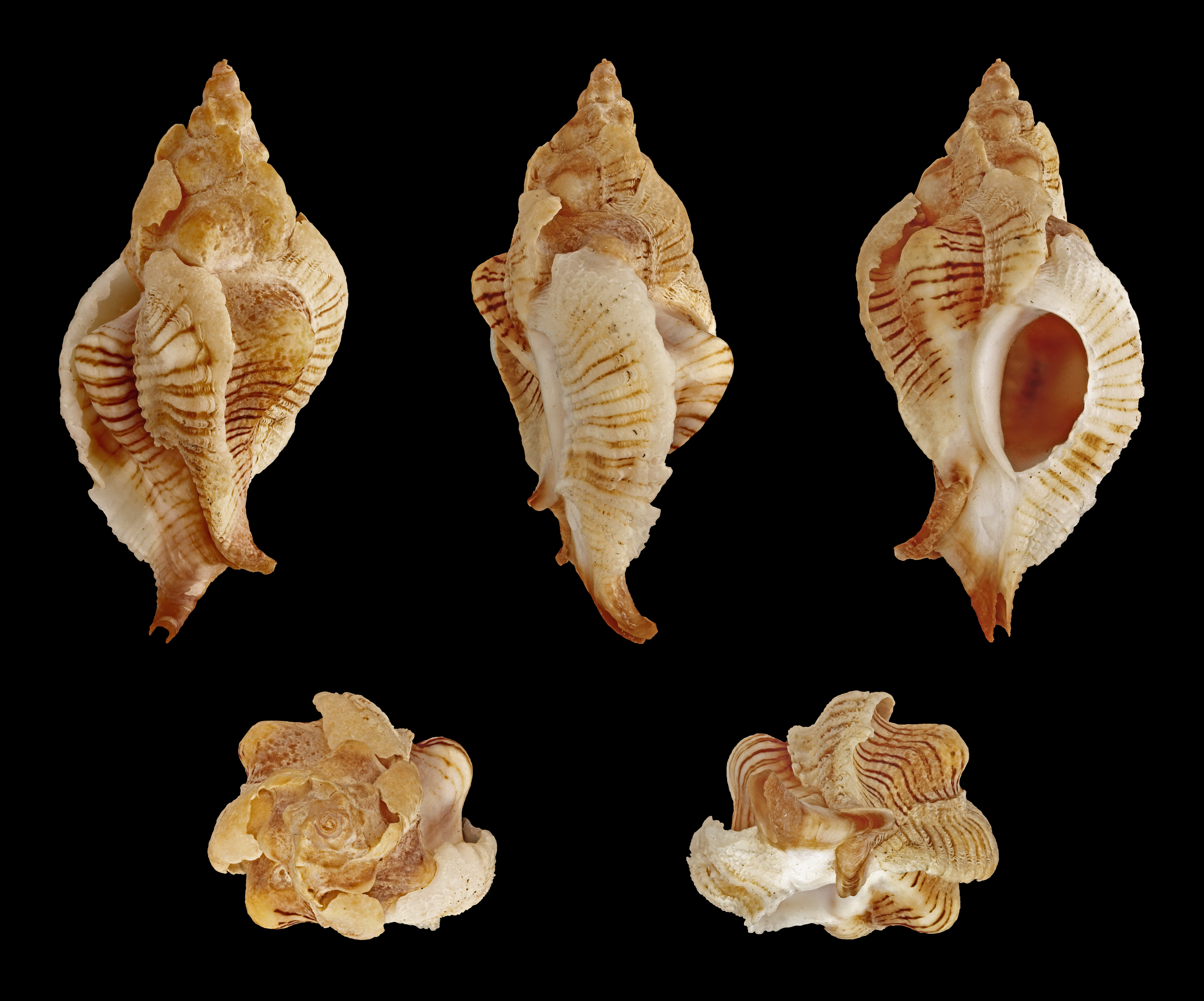
- Pteropurpura festiva (Hinds, 1844)

Scientific classification
- Kingdom: Animalia
- Phylum: Mollusca
- Class: Gastropoda
- Subclass: Caenogastropoda
- Order: Neogastropoda
- Superfamily: Muricoidea
- Family: Muricidae
- Subfamily: Ocenebrinae
- Genus: Pteropurpura; Jousseaume, 1880

Type species
- Murex macropterus Deshayes, 1839

Synonyms
- Centrifuga Grant & Gale, 1931; Ceratostoma (Pteropurpura) Jousseaume, 1880; Murex (Pteropurpura) Jousseaume, 1880; Pteropurpura (Centrifuga) U. S. Grant & Gale, 1931; Pteropurpura (Pteropurpura) Jousseaume, 1880· accepted, alternate representation; Pterynotus (Pteropurpura) Jousseaume, 1880; Purpura (Centrifuga) U. S. Grant & Gale, 1931 ·; Shaskyus J. Q. Burch & G. B. Campbell, 1963

= Pteropurpura =

Genus of gastropods

Pteropurpura, common name the stag shells, is a genus of sea snails, marine gastropod mollusks in the subfamily Ocenebrinae of the family Muricidae, the murex snails or rock snails.

== Species ==
Species within the genus Pteropurpura include:

- Pteropurpura benderskyi Emerson & D'Attilio, 1979
- Pteropurpura bequaerti Clench & Farfante, 1945
- Pteropurpura centrifuga (Hinds, 1844)
- Pteropurpura dearmata (Odhner, 1922)
- Pteropurpura deroyana Berry, 1968
- Pteropurpura erinaceoides (Valenciennes, 1832)
- Pteropurpura esycha (Dall, 1925)
- Pteropurpura fairiana (Houart, 1979)
- Pteropurpura festiva (Hinds, 1844)
- † Pteropurpura friedbergi (Cossmann & Peyrot, 1924)
- Pteropurpura macroptera (Deshayes, 1839)
- Pteropurpura modesta (Fulton, 1936)
- Pteropurpura plorator (Adams & Reeve, 1845)
- Pteropurpura sanctaehelenae (E.A. Smith, 1891)
- Pteropurpura stimpsoni (A. Adams, 1863)
- Pteropurpura trialata (Sowerby, 1834)
- Pteropurpura vokesae Emerson, 1964

Species brought into synonymy

- Pteropurpura adunca (G. B. Sowerby II, 1834): synonym of Pteropurpura falcata (G. B. Sowerby II, 1834): synonym of Ocinebrellus falcatus (G. B. Sowerby II, 1834)
- Pteropurpura capensis (G.B. Sowerby II, 1841): synonym of Pteropurpura uncinaria (Lamarck, 1822): synonym of Poropteron uncinarius (Lamarck, 1822)
- Pteropurpura debruini Lorenz, 1989: synonym of Poropteron debruini (Lorenz, 1989)
- Pteropurpura expansa (Sowerby, 1860): synonym of Pteropurpura plorator (A. Adams & Reeve, 1845)
- Pteropurpura falcata (G. B. Sowerby II, 1834): synonym of Ocinebrellus falcatus (G. B. Sowerby II, 1834)
- Pteropurpura graagae (Coen, 1943): synonym of Poropteron graagae (Coen, 1943)
- Pteropurpura incurvispina Kilburn, 1970: synonym of Poropteron graagae (Coen, 1943)
- Pteropurpura inornata (Récluz, 1851): synonym of Ocenebra inornata (Récluz, 1851)
- Pteropurpura joostei Lorenz, 1990: synonym of Poropteron quinquelobatus (G. B. Sowerby II, 1879)
- † Pteropurpura laetifica (Finlay, 1930): synonym of † Timbellus laetificus (Finlay, 1930)
- Pteropurpura leeana (Dall, 1890): synonym of Calcitrapessa leeana (Dall, 1890)
- Pteropurpura multicornis Houart, 1991: synonym of Poropteron multicornis (Houart, 1991) (original combination)
- Pteropurpura quinquelobata (G. B. Sowerby II, 1879): synonym of Poropteron quinquelobatus (G. B. Sowerby II, 1879)
- Pteropurpura transkeiana Houart, 1991: synonym of Poropteron transkeianus (Houart, 1991) (original combination)
- Pteropurpura uncinaria (Lamarck, 1822): synonym of Poropteron uncinarius (Lamarck, 1822)
- Subgenus Pteropurpura (Ceratostoma): synonym of Ceratostoma Herrmannsen, 1846
- Pteropurpura (Ceratostoma) vespertilio Kuroda in Kira, 1959: synonym of Timbellus vespertilio (Kuroda in Kira, 1959)
