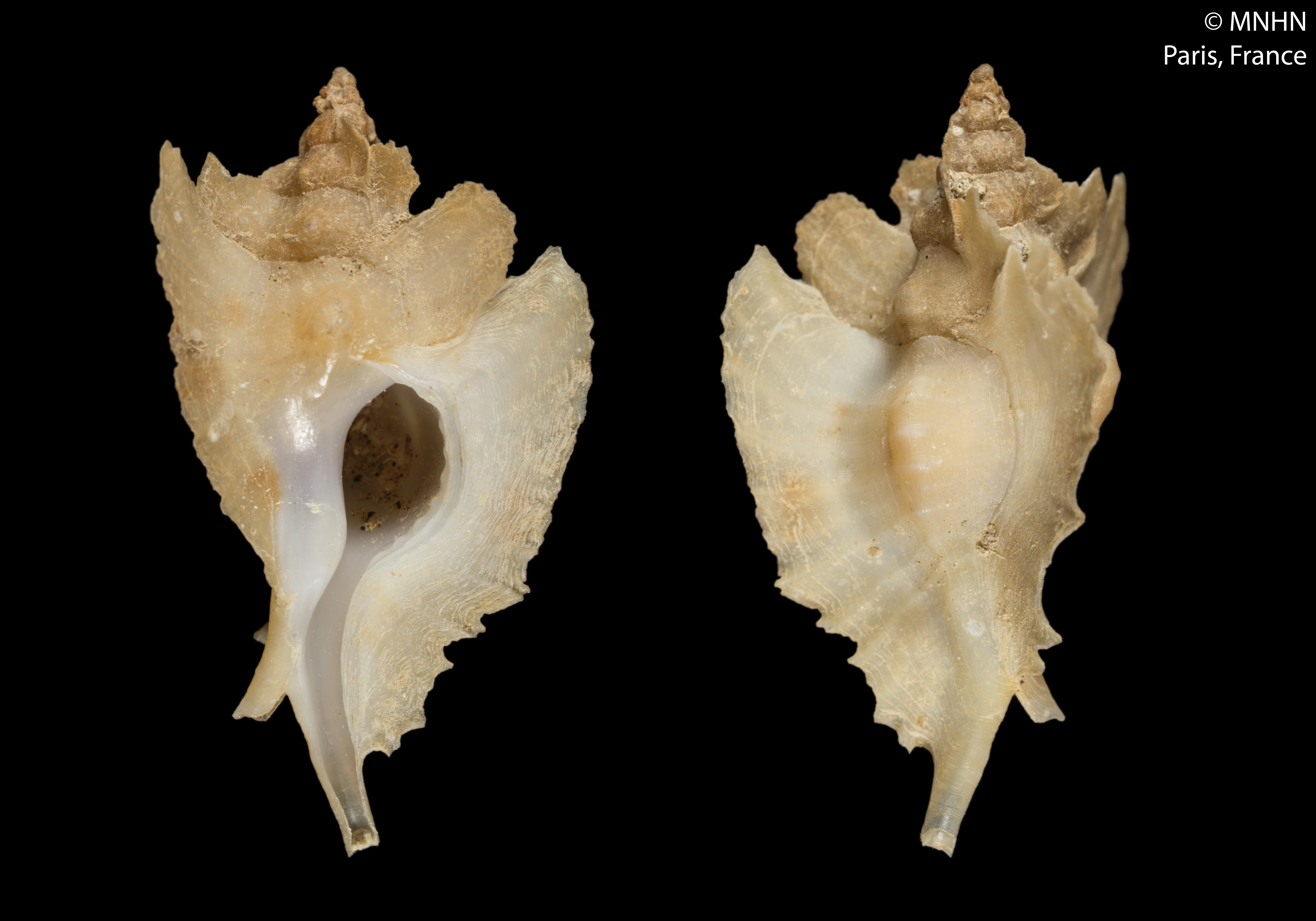
- Shell of Timbellus atlantideus (holotype at MNHN, Paris)

Scientific classification
- Kingdom: Animalia
- Phylum: Mollusca
- Class: Gastropoda
- Subclass: Caenogastropoda
- Order: Neogastropoda
- Family: Muricidae
- Genus: Timbellus
- Species: T. atlantideus

Binomial name
- Timbellus atlantideus (Bouchet & Warén, 1985)

Synonyms
- Pterynotus atlantideus Bouchet & Warén, 1985 (basionym)

= Timbellus atlantideus =

Species of gastropod

Timbellus atlantideus is a species of sea snail, a marine gastropod mollusk in the family Muricidae, the murex snails or rock snails.

== Description ==
The size of an adult shell varies between 18 mm and 30 mm.

Shell solid and fusiform, with a small white protoconch and tan adult whorls with faint brownish blotches. The adult sculpture has three varices and three intervarical nodes per whorl, with distinct spinose spiral cords and faint axial ridges. Aperture is elliptical, with seven denticules on the outer lip.

T. atlantideus is most similar to T. leucas, from which it differs in its smaller protoconch, prominent intervarical nodes, and tan color.

== Distribution ==
This species is found in the Atlantic Ocean along the Azores, as well as on the Great Meteor Seamount.

== Ecology ==
T. atlantideus is suspected by Hoffmann et al. (2020) to be a potential predator of Basilissopsis athenae, a deep-water gastropod of the family Seguenziidae which also occurs in the South Azorean Seamount Chain.
