= Timbellus radwini =

Scientific classification
- Kingdom: Animalia
- Phylum: Mollusca
- Class: Gastropoda
- Subclass: Caenogastropoda
- Order: Neogastropoda
- Family: Muricidae
- Genus: Timbellus
- Species: T. radwini

Binomial name
- Timbellus radwini (Harasewych & Jensen, 1979)

Synonyms
- Pterynotus radwini Harasewych & Jensen, 1979 (basionym)

Species of gastropod

Timbellus radwini, common name Radwin's murex, is a species of sea snail, a marine gastropod mollusk in the family Muricidae, the murex snails or rock snails.

== Description ==
The size of an adult shell varies between 30 mm and 40 mm.

== Distribution ==
This marine species can be found in the Caribbean Sea along Belize and Honduras.

== Ecology and Habitat ==
Timbellus radwini inhabits shallow marine environments in the Caribbean Sea, particularly on hard substrates such as rocky bottoms and coral rubble typical of many muricid habitats. Members of the family Muricidae are predatory sea snails that feed on other invertebrates, often using a specialized radula and acidic secretions to bore into the shells of bivalves and other mollusks, a behavior documented for muricids generally.

Muricids are found in a range of coastal marine habitats from intertidal zones to subtidal depths on sandy, rocky, or coral-associated bottoms, where they play a role as benthic predators in their ecosystems. Reproductive strategies in muricids typically involve laying egg capsules on hard surfaces, with larvae that develop in the plankton before settling, although species-specific data for T. radwini are yet to be published.
