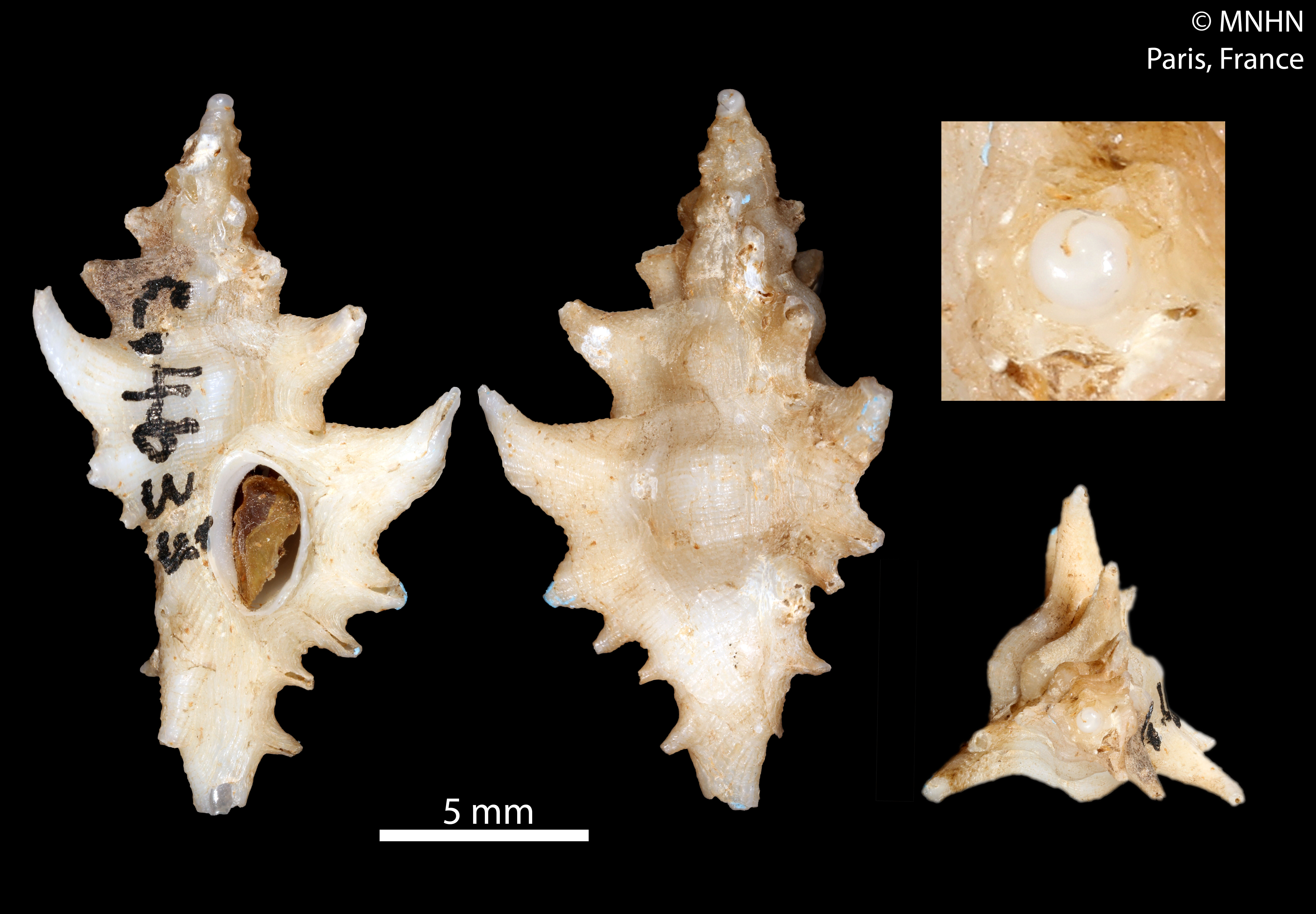
- Shell of Poropteron transkeianus (paratype at MNHN, Paris)

Scientific classification
- Kingdom: Animalia
- Phylum: Mollusca
- Class: Gastropoda
- Subclass: Caenogastropoda
- Order: Neogastropoda
- Superfamily: Muricoidea
- Family: Muricidae
- Subfamily: Ocenebrinae
- Genus: Poropteron; Jousseaume, 1880

Type species
- Murex uncinarius Lamarck, 1822

Synonyms
- Murex (Poropteron) Jousseaume, 1880; Pteropurpura (Poropteron) Jousseaume, 1880

= Poropteron =

Genus of sea snails

Poropteron is a genus of sea snail, a marine gastropod mollusc in the subfamily Ocenebrinae of the family Muricidae, the murex snails or rock snails.

== General characteristics ==
(Original description in French) The shell is somewhat triangular in shape, with a fairly elevated pyramidal spire. The whorls are ornamented with three thick, lamellar varices, crenellated by projecting, grooved ribs and ending posteriorly in a rather long spine curved like a hook. The aperture is oval, with continuous and detached margins, while the siphonal canal is short and closed.

== Species ==
- Poropteron debruini (Lorenz, 1989)
- Poropteron graagae (Coen, 1943)
- Poropteron multicornis (Houart, 1991)
- Poropteron quinquelobatus (G. B. Sowerby II, 1879)
- Poropteron transkeianus (Houart, 1991)
- Poropteron uncinarius (Lamarck, 1822)
