= Timbellus flemingi =

Scientific classification
- Kingdom: Animalia
- Phylum: Mollusca
- Class: Gastropoda
- Subclass: Caenogastropoda
- Order: Neogastropoda
- Family: Muricidae
- Genus: Timbellus
- Species: T. flemingi

Binomial name
- Timbellus flemingi (Beu, 1967)

Synonyms
- Pterynotus flemingi Beu, 1967 (basionym)

Species of gastropod

Timbellus flemingi is a species of sea snail, a marine gastropod mollusk in the family Muricidae, the murex snails or rock snails.

== Distribution ==
This marine species is found along New Zealand.
