= Pteropurpura plorator =

Scientific classification
- Kingdom: Animalia
- Phylum: Mollusca
- Class: Gastropoda
- Subclass: Caenogastropoda
- Order: Neogastropoda
- Family: Muricidae
- Genus: Pteropurpura
- Species: P. plorator

Binomial name
- Pteropurpura plorator (Adams & Reeve, 1845)

Synonyms
- Murex expansus G.B. Sowerby II, 1860; Murex plorator Adams & Reeve, 1845; Pteronotus brachypteron A. Adams, 1863; Pteropurpura (Pteropurpura) expansa (G.B. Sowerby II, 1860)

Species of gastropod

Pteropurpura plorator is a species of sea snail, a marine gastropod mollusk in the family Muricidae, the murex snails or rock snails.
