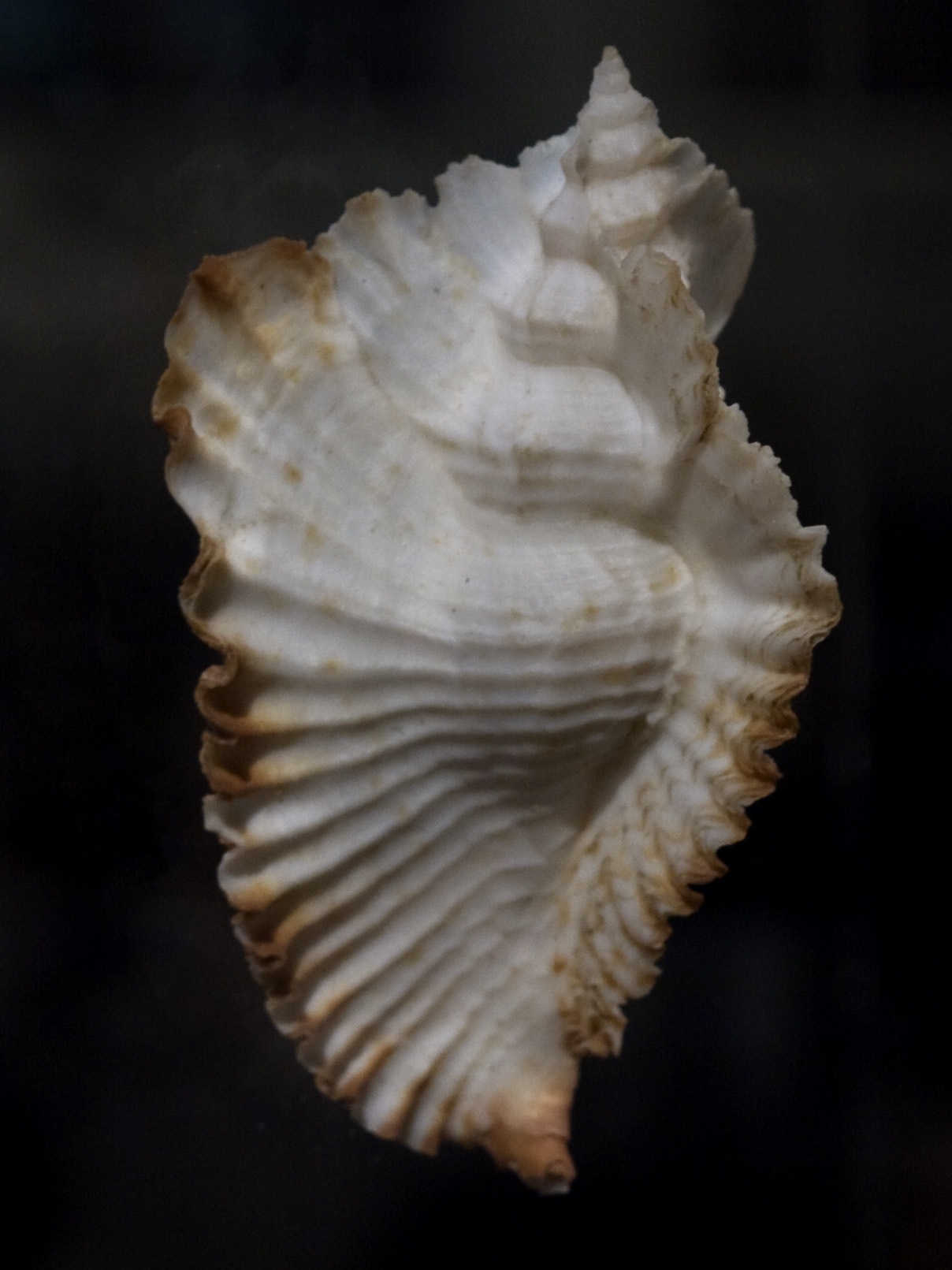
- Lateral view of a shell of Timbellus bednalli

Scientific classification
- Kingdom: Animalia
- Phylum: Mollusca
- Class: Gastropoda
- Subclass: Caenogastropoda
- Order: Neogastropoda
- Family: Muricidae
- Genus: Timbellus
- Species: T. bednalli

Binomial name
- Timbellus bednalli (Brazier, 1878)

Synonyms
- Murex bednalli Brazier, 1878(basionym); Murex trigonularis Lamarck, 1822; Pterynotus bednalli (Brazier, 1878)

= Timbellus bednalli =

Species of gastropod

Timbellus bednalli, common name Bednall's murex, is a species of sea snail, a marine gastropod mollusk in the family Muricidae, the rock snails or murex snails. the rock snails or murex snails. This species is endemic to the waters of Northern and Western Australia, where it is typically found in sublittoral zones on rocky or coral substrates. The shell of T. bednalli is noted for its elegant and complex architecture, characterized by three prominent, wing-like longitudinal varix (frills) on each whorl. These delicate, leaf-like expansions are a hallmark of the genus Timbellus and serve as both structural reinforcement and potential defense against predators.

== Description ==
The shell typically reaches a length of approximately 60 mm to 85 mm and exhibits a coloration ranging from creamy white to pale brown, often with subtle darker banding. As a carnivorous gastropod, it utilizes its specialized radula to bore into the shells of other mollusks or barnacles. The species was named in honor of William Thomas Bednall, a prominent 19th-century South Australian naturalist and malacologist who contributed significantly to the documentation of Australian marine fauna.

== Distribution ==
This species is found along North and West Australia.
