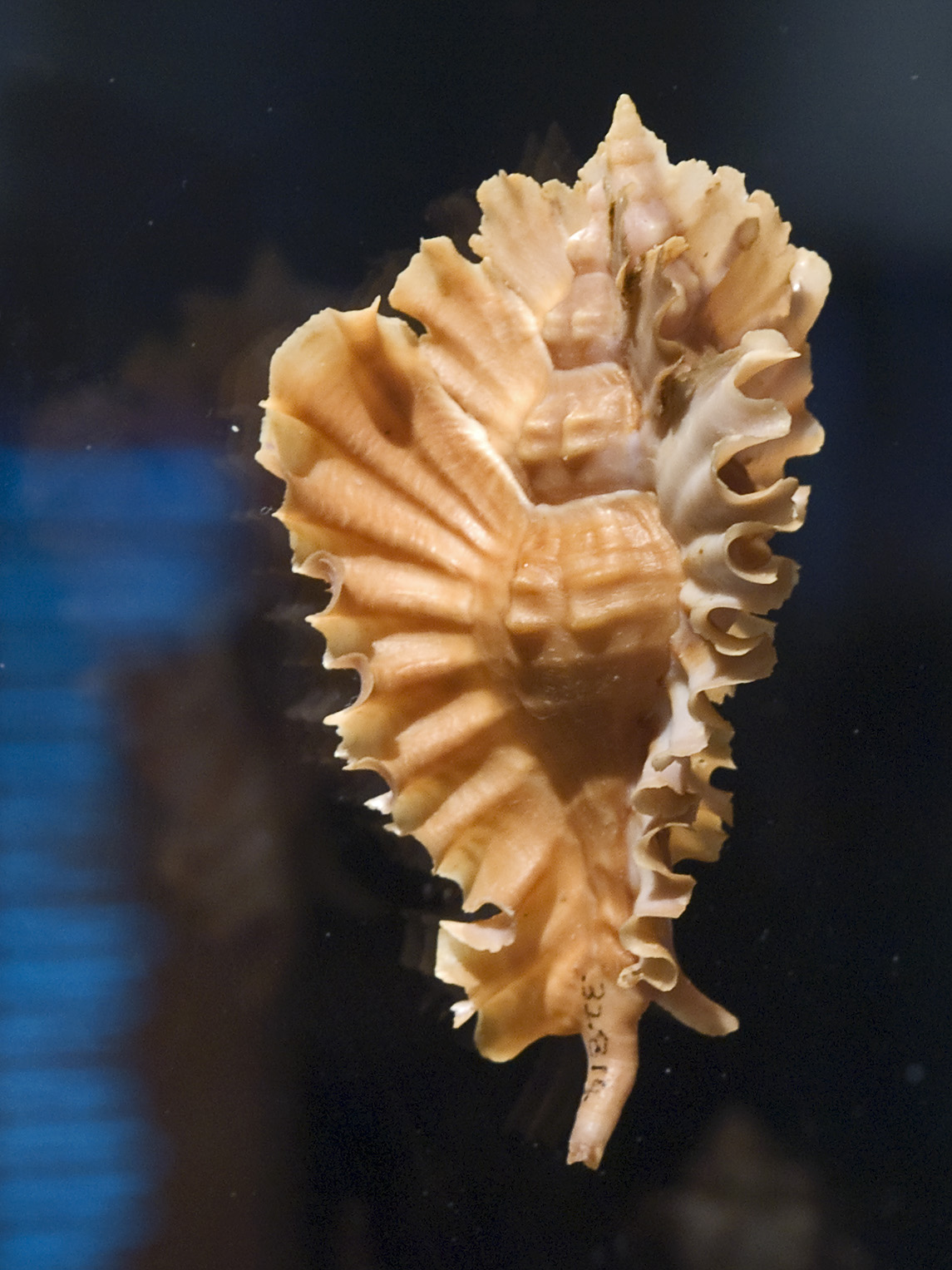
- Shell of Timbellus phyllopterus

Scientific classification
- Kingdom: Animalia
- Phylum: Mollusca
- Class: Gastropoda
- Subclass: Caenogastropoda
- Order: Neogastropoda
- Family: Muricidae
- Genus: Timbellus
- Species: T. phyllopterus

Binomial name
- Timbellus phyllopterus (Lamarck, 1822)

Synonyms
- Murex phyllopterus Lamarck, 1822; Murex rubridentatus Reeve, 1846; Pterynotus phyllopterus (Lamarck, 1822)

= Timbellus phyllopterus =

Species of gastropod

Timbellus phyllopterus, common name : the leafy winged murex, is a species of sea snail, a marine gastropod mollusk in the family Muricidae, the murex snails or rock snails.

== Description ==
The size of an adult shell varies between 50 mm and 100 mm. The color of the shell can range from a tan to ivory white color.

== Distribution ==
This marine species is distributed along the Lesser Antilles and the Mid-Atlantic Ridge. Sourced primarily by divers in Guadeloupe and Martinique, but presumably also to be found at Dominica which lies between those two French islands.
