= Timbellus fernandezi =

Scientific classification
- Kingdom: Animalia
- Phylum: Mollusca
- Class: Gastropoda
- Subclass: Caenogastropoda
- Order: Neogastropoda
- Family: Muricidae
- Genus: Timbellus
- Species: T. fernandezi

Binomial name
- Timbellus fernandezi (Houart, 2000)

Synonyms
- Pterynotus fernandezi Houart, 2000 (basionym)

Species of gastropod

Timbellus fernandezi is a species of sea snail, a marine gastropod mollusk in the family Muricidae, the murex snails or rock snails.
