= Pteropurpura sanctaehelenae =

Scientific classification
- Kingdom: Animalia
- Phylum: Mollusca
- Class: Gastropoda
- Subclass: Caenogastropoda
- Order: Neogastropoda
- Family: Muricidae
- Genus: Pteropurpura
- Species: P. sanctaehelenae

Binomial name
- Pteropurpura sanctaehelenae (E.A. Smith, 1891)

Synonyms
- Murex sanctaehelenae E.A. Smith, 1891

Species of gastropod

Pteropurpura sanctaehelenae is a species of sea snail, a marine gastropod mollusk in the family Muricidae, the murex snails or rock snails.
