= Timbellus xenos =

Scientific classification
- Kingdom: Animalia
- Phylum: Mollusca
- Class: Gastropoda
- Subclass: Caenogastropoda
- Order: Neogastropoda
- Family: Muricidae
- Genus: Timbellus
- Species: T. xenos

Binomial name
- Timbellus xenos (Harasewych, 1982)

Synonyms
- Pterynotus xenos Harasewych, 1982 (basionym)

Species of gastropod

Timbellus xenos is a species of sea snail, a marine gastropod mollusk in the family Muricidae, the murex snails or rock snails.

== Description ==
The shell grows to a length of 6.3 mm.

== Distribution ==
This marine species is found in the Caribbean Sea and the Gulf of Mexico.
