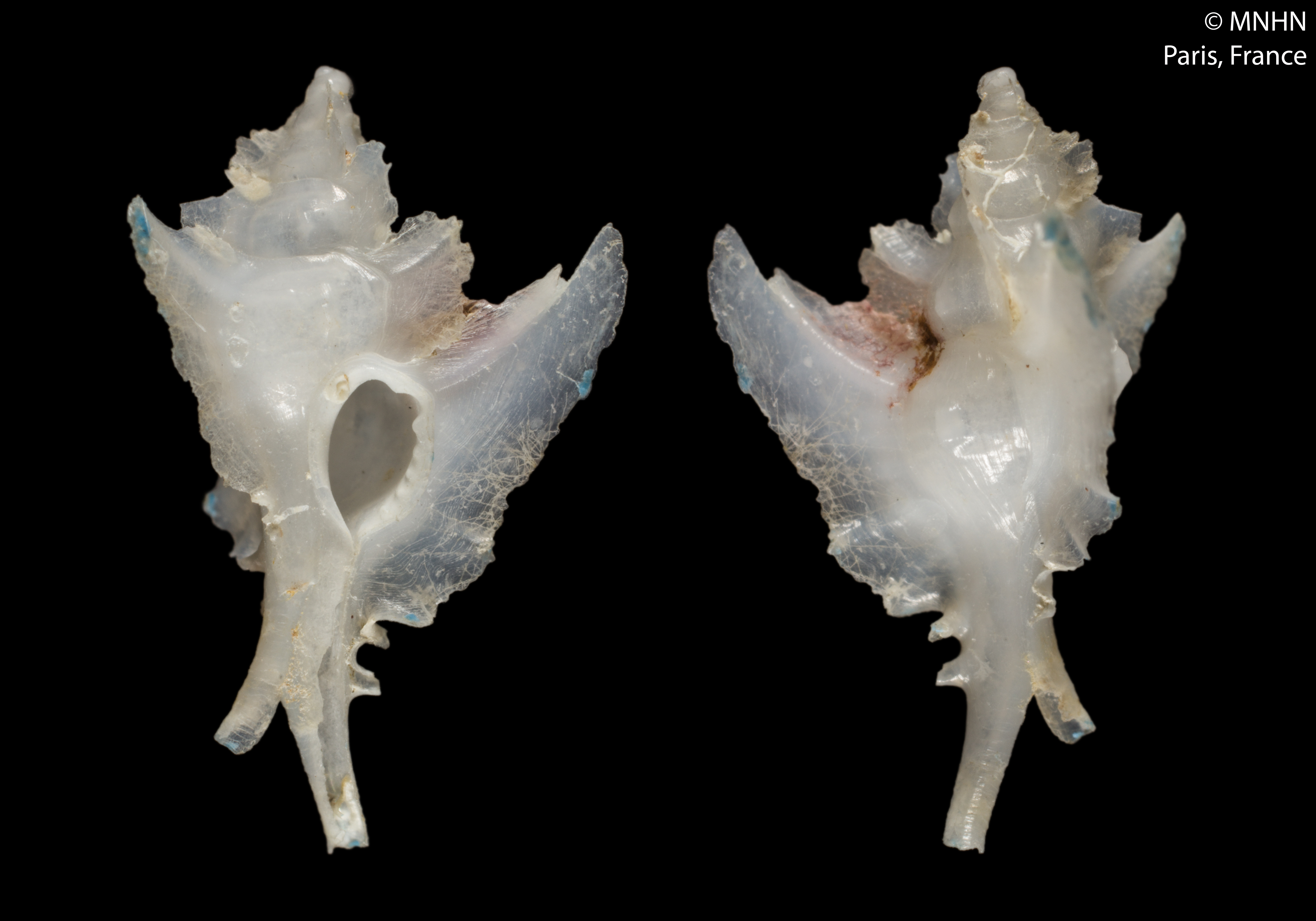
- Shell of Timbellus crauroptera (holotype at MNHN, Paris)

Scientific classification
- Kingdom: Animalia
- Phylum: Mollusca
- Class: Gastropoda
- Subclass: Caenogastropoda
- Order: Neogastropoda
- Family: Muricidae
- Genus: Timbellus
- Species: T. crauroptera

Binomial name
- Timbellus crauroptera (Houart, 1991)

Synonyms
- Pterynotus crauroptera Houart, 1991 (basionym)

= Timbellus crauroptera =

Species of gastropod

Timbellus crauroptera is a species of sea snail, a marine gastropod mollusk in the family Muricidae, the murex snails or rock snails.

== Description ==
The shell grows to a length of 11.4-15 mm at maturity, and has a high spire with 1.5 rounded, smooth, glossy protoconch whorls with a thin, weakly erect terminal varix. The shell also has 5-6 narrow teleoconch whorls, each with three "wing-like" varicies, which curve upward, and have a narrow groove in the adapertural side. The shell also features an intervariacal axial sculpture consisting of a single, prominent node situated midway between each pair of variceal wings, which are crossed by 2-4 spiral cords on the last teleoconch whorl, as well as a spiral sculpture of 5-6 smooth cords. The aperture is small and ovate, and the columellar lip is smooth, with an abapically erect rim. The anal notch is broad, and delineated by one small denticle. The outer lip is weakly erect, with 5 strong denticles within. The siphonal canal is of moderate length for Timbellus snails, narrowly open, bent abaxially and adaperturally, with 2 small open spines. The shell is translucent white, with the largest paratype having a pale brown tip of the siphonal canal and first 2 teleoconch whorls.

== Distribution ==
This species is found in the Coral Sea and off New Caledonia.
