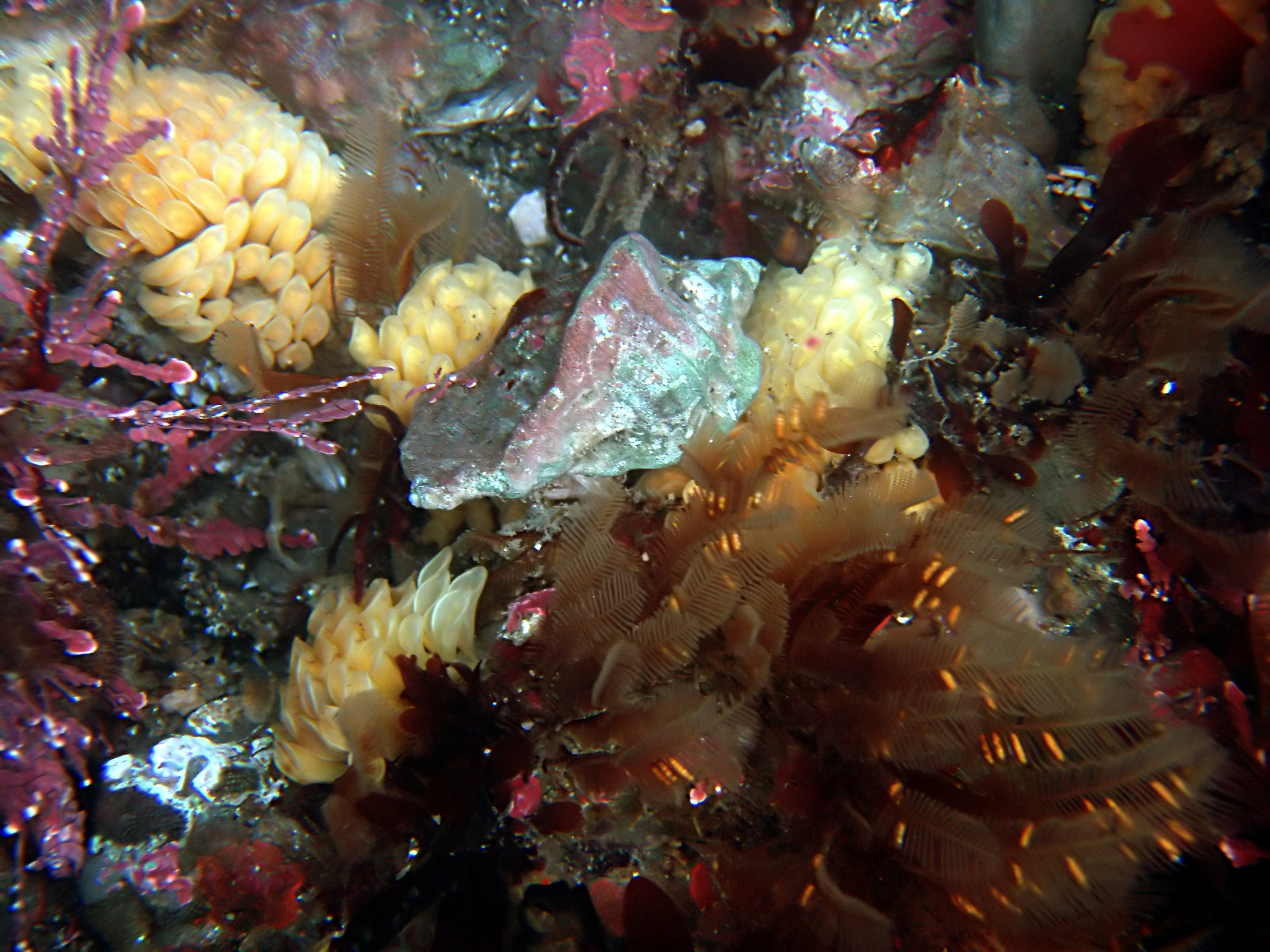
- Pteropurpura trialata laying eggs.

Scientific classification
- Kingdom: Animalia
- Phylum: Mollusca
- Class: Gastropoda
- Subclass: Caenogastropoda
- Order: Neogastropoda
- Family: Muricidae
- Genus: Pteropurpura
- Species: P. trialata

Binomial name
- Pteropurpura trialata G. B. Sowerby II, 1834

Synonyms
- Murex trialatus G. B. Sowerby II, 1834; Pterynotus trialatus

= Pteropurpura trialata =

Species of gastropod

Pteropurpura trialata, the three-winged murex, is a medium-sized species of predatory sea snail, a marine gastropod mollusk in the family Muricidae, the rock snails or murex snails. It is native to the eastern Pacific Ocean.

== Description ==
The shell can grow to a length of 93 mm (3.7 in). It is fusiform and fairly thick, with a spire angle of 40-42°. The protoconch has one and a half smooth, conical whorls, while the teleoconch has eight whorls which are moderately convex. Each whorl has three elaborately sculptured varices (thickened protruding ridges) with nine to twelve fluted cords extending onto the varices.

== Distribution ==
The three-winged murex occurs in the semi-tropical eastern Pacific Ocean, its range extending from northern California, through Baja California to Mexico.
