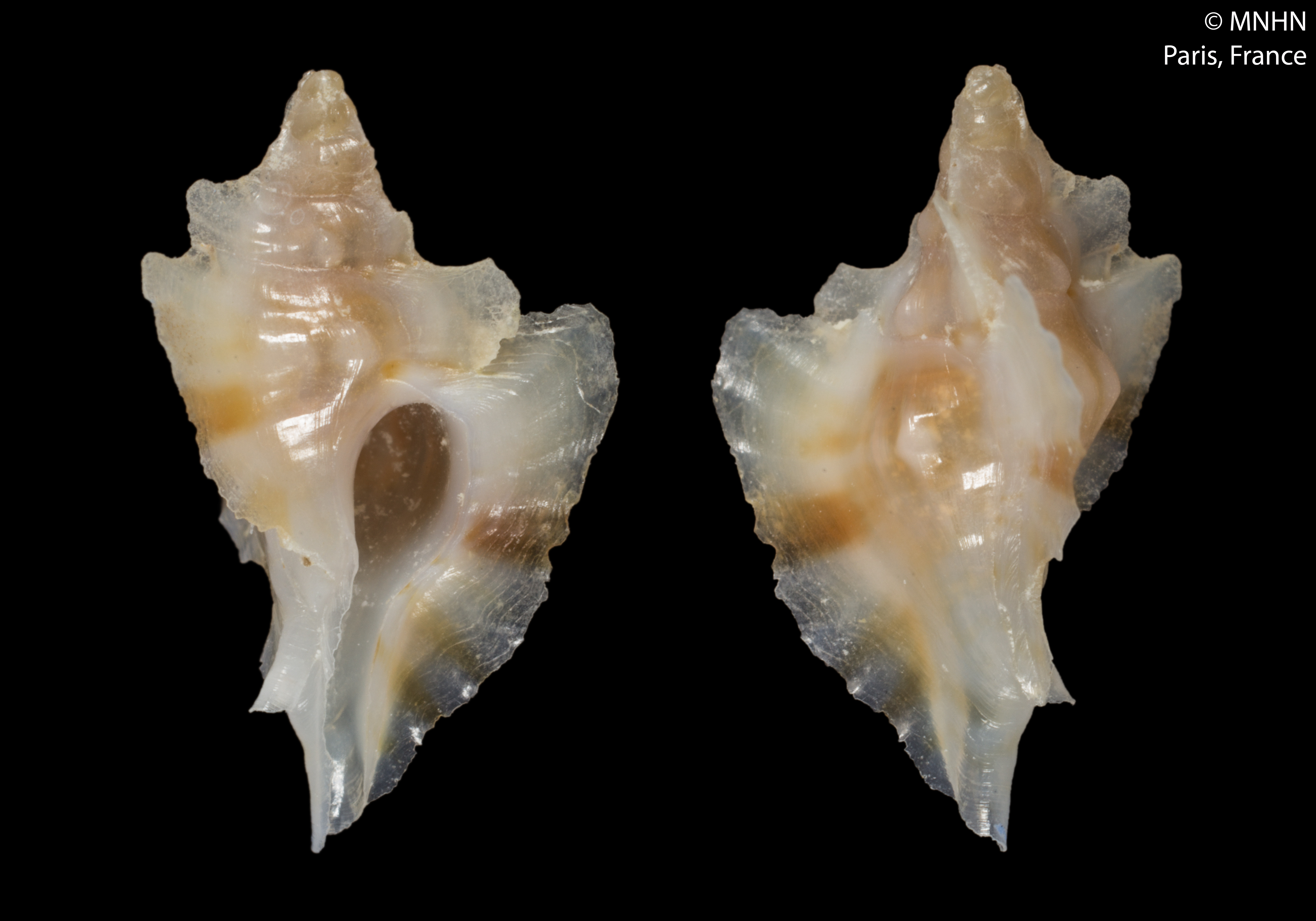
- Shell of Timbellus rubidus (paratype at MNHN, Paris)

Scientific classification
- Kingdom: Animalia
- Phylum: Mollusca
- Class: Gastropoda
- Subclass: Caenogastropoda
- Order: Neogastropoda
- Family: Muricidae
- Genus: Timbellus
- Species: T. rubidus

Binomial name
- Timbellus rubidus (Houart, 2001)

Synonyms
- Pterynotus rubidus Houart, 2001 (basionym)

= Timbellus rubidus =

Species of gastropod

Timbellus rubidus is a species of sea snail, a marine gastropod mollusk in the family Muricidae, the murex snails or rock snails.

== Description ==
The length of the shell attains 13.2 mm.

== Distribution ==
This marine species is found off New Caledonia.
