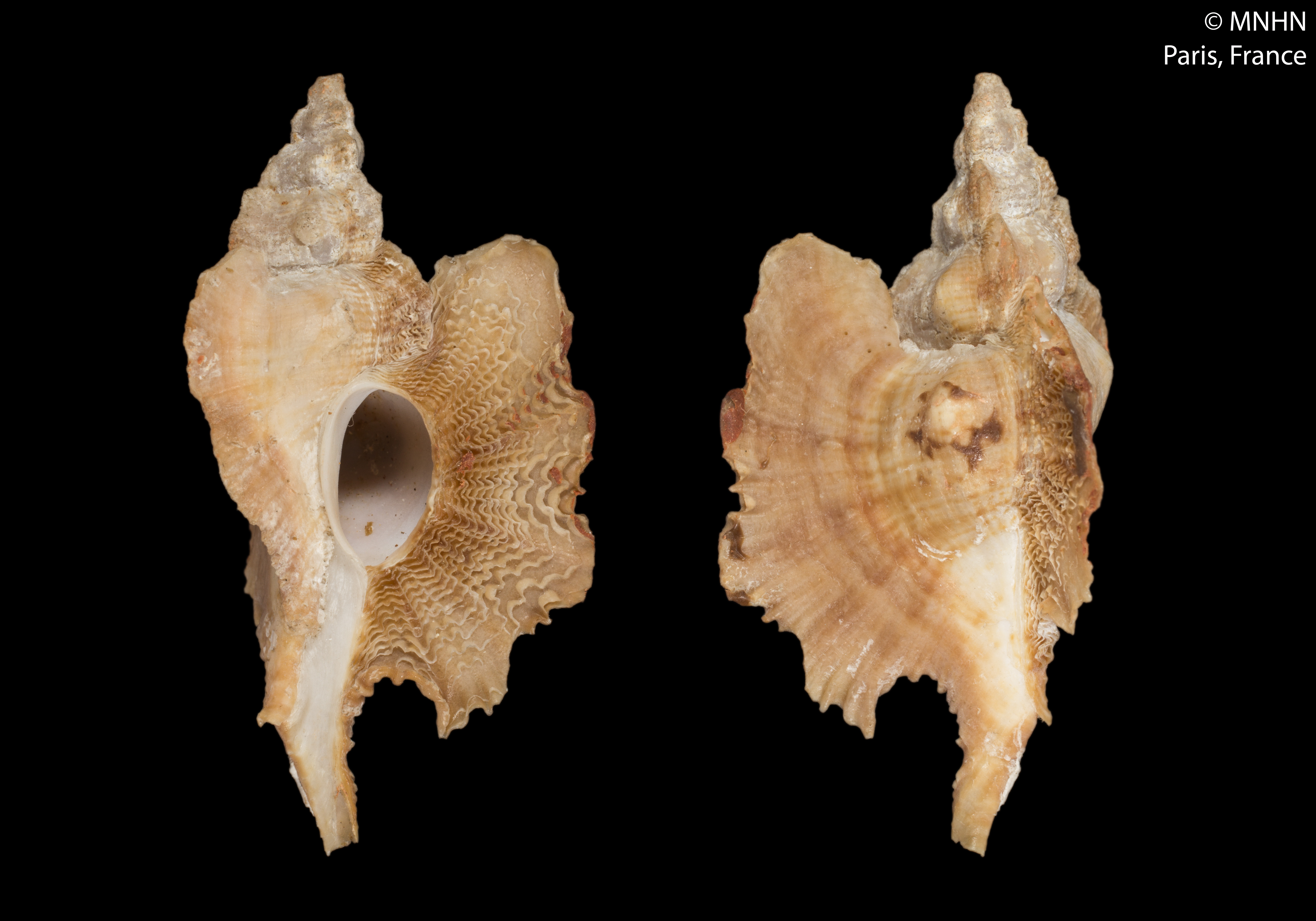
- Pteropurpura macroptera shell (syntype at MNHN, Paris)

Scientific classification
- Kingdom: Animalia
- Phylum: Mollusca
- Class: Gastropoda
- Subclass: Caenogastropoda
- Order: Neogastropoda
- Family: Muricidae
- Genus: Pteropurpura
- Species: P. macroptera

Binomial name
- Pteropurpura macroptera (Deshayes, 1839)

Synonyms
- Murex macropterus Deshayes, 1839; Murex erinaceoides Valenciennes, 1832 (original combination); Murex petri Dall, 1900; Murex tremperi Dall, 1910; Muricidea erinaceoides (Valenciennes, 1832); Pteronotus carpenteri Dall, 1899; Pteronotus carpenteri var. alba Berry, 1908; Pteropurpura (Pteropurpura) erinaceoides (Valenciennes, 1832)· accepted, alternate representation

= Pteropurpura macroptera =

Species of gastropod

Pteropurpura macroptera is a species of sea snail, a marine gastropod mollusk in the family Muricidae, the murex snails or rock snails.

== Description ==
Shell size 40-50 mm.

== Distribution ==
30-40 m. depth, on muddy bottom: California, West coast of North America.
