= Pteropurpura vokesae =

Scientific classification
- Kingdom: Animalia
- Phylum: Mollusca
- Class: Gastropoda
- Subclass: Caenogastropoda
- Order: Neogastropoda
- Family: Muricidae
- Genus: Pteropurpura
- Species: P. vokesae

Binomial name
- Pteropurpura vokesae Emerson, 1964

Synonyms
- Murex rhyssus Dall, 1919

Species of gastropod

Pteropurpura vokesae is a species of sea snail, a marine gastropod mollusk in the family Muricidae, the murex snails or rock snails.

== Description ==
This frilly, operculated, yellow-brown species attains 50 mm. in size.

== Distribution ==
Eastern Pacific Ocean: West coast of North America, off California.
