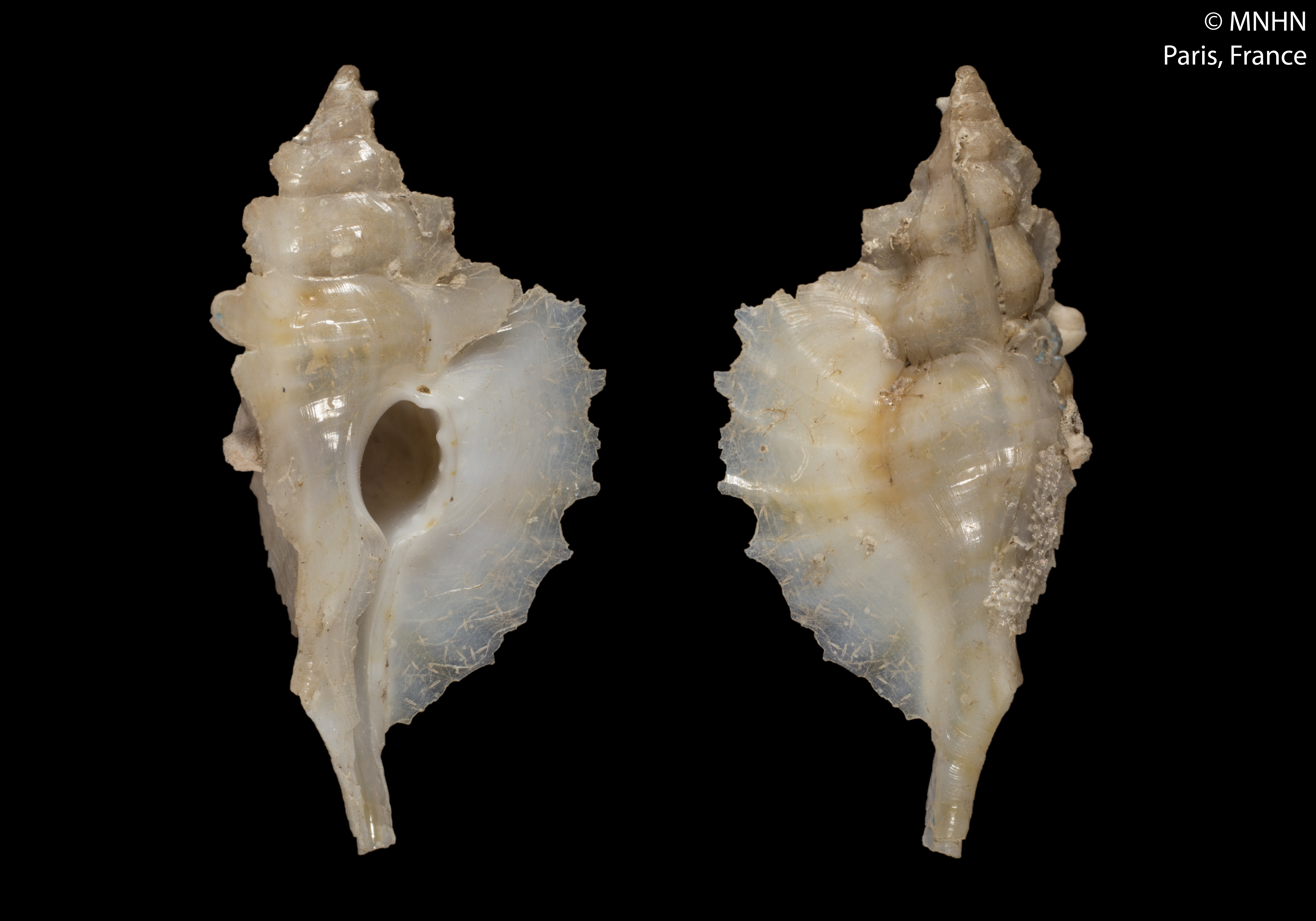
- Shell of Timbellus fulgens (holotype at MNHN, Paris)

Scientific classification
- Kingdom: Animalia
- Phylum: Mollusca
- Class: Gastropoda
- Subclass: Caenogastropoda
- Order: Neogastropoda
- Family: Muricidae
- Genus: Timbellus
- Species: T. fulgens

Binomial name
- Timbellus fulgens (Houart, 1988)

Synonyms
- Pterynotus fulgens Houart, 1988 (basionym)

= Timbellus fulgens =

Species of gastropod

Timbellus fulgens is a species of sea snail, a marine gastropod mollusk in the family Muricidae, the murex snails or rock snails.

== Distribution ==
This species is distributed in the Indian Ocean along South Africa and in the Pacific Ocean along New Caledonia.
