= Pteropurpura esycha =

Scientific classification
- Kingdom: Animalia
- Phylum: Mollusca
- Class: Gastropoda
- Subclass: Caenogastropoda
- Order: Neogastropoda
- Family: Muricidae
- Genus: Pteropurpura
- Species: P. esycha

Binomial name
- Pteropurpura esycha (Dall, 1925)

Synonyms
- Murex esychus Dall, 1925

Species of gastropod

Pteropurpura esycha is a species of sea snail, a marine gastropod mollusk in the family Muricidae, the murex snails or rock snails.
