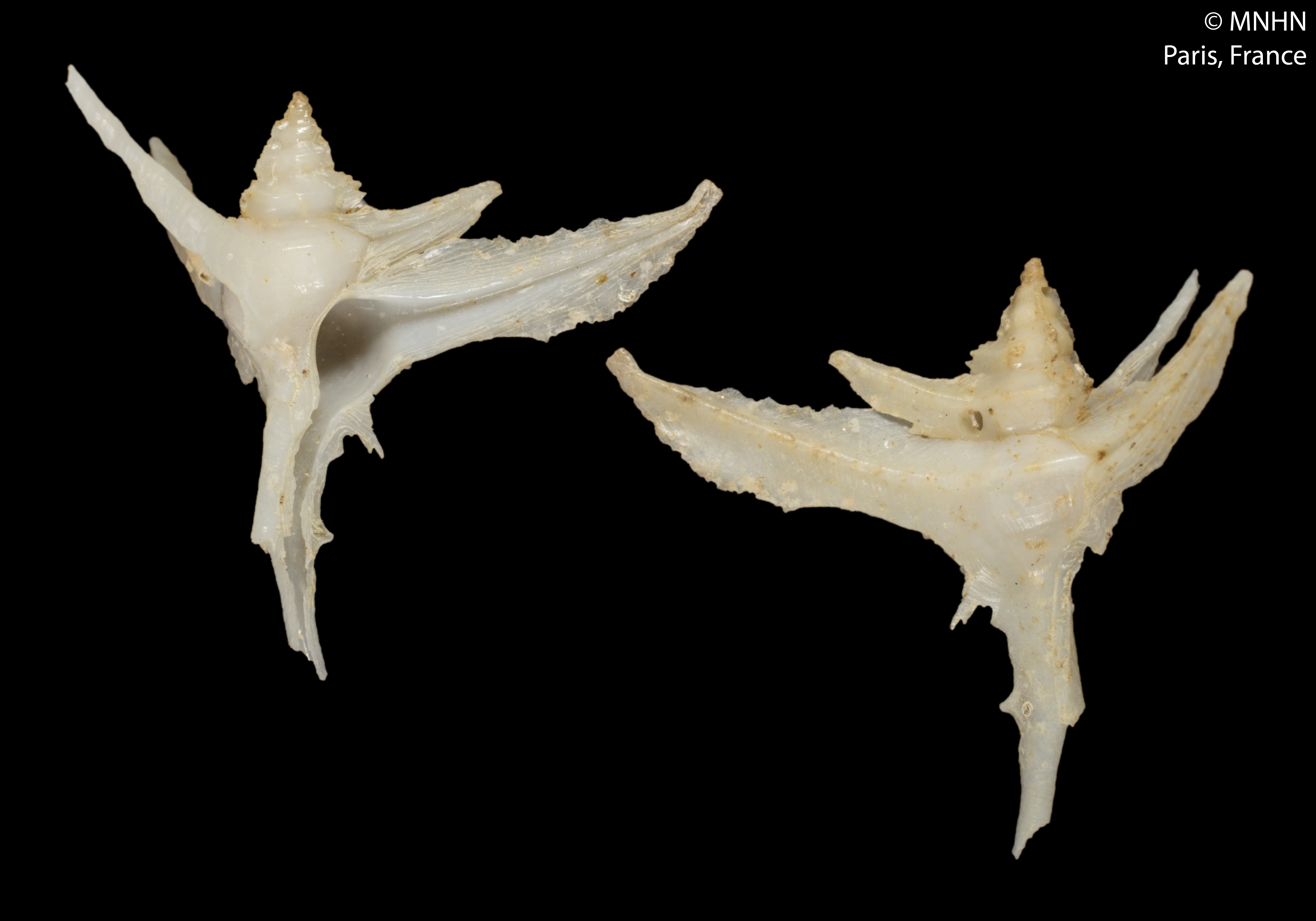
- Timbellus richeri

Scientific classification
- Kingdom: Animalia
- Phylum: Mollusca
- Class: Gastropoda
- Subclass: Caenogastropoda
- Order: Neogastropoda
- Superfamily: Muricoidea
- Family: Muricidae
- Subfamily: Muricinae
- Genus: Timbellus de Gregorio, 1885

Type species
- † Murex latifolius Bellardi, 1872

Synonyms
- Murex (Timbellus) de Gregorio, 1885 (original rank as subgenus)

= Timbellus =

Genus of gastropods

Timbellus is a genus of sea snails, marine gastropod mollusks in the family Muricidae, the murex snails or rock snails.

== Species ==
Species within the genus Timbellus include:

- † Timbellus arenarius (Steuer, 1912)
- Timbellus atlantideus (Bouchet & Warén, 1985)
- † Timbellus barattus (De Gregorio, 1895)
- Timbellus bednalli (Brazier, 1878)
- Timbellus bilobatus Houart, 2012
- † Timbellus brevicauda (Hébert, 1849)
- †Timbellus calvus (Tate, 1888)
- † Timbellus capitaneus Pacaud, Goret & Ledon, 2017
- Timbellus corbariae Houart, 2015
- Timbellus crauroptera (Houart, 1991)
- † Timbellus crenulatus (Röding, 1798)
- † Timbellus danapris Pacaud, 2018
- † Timbellus detritus (Koenen, 1890)
- Timbellus emilyae (Espinosa, Ortea & Fernández-Garcés, 2007)
- Timbellus fernandezi (Houart, 2000)
- Timbellus flemingi (Beu, 1967)
- Timbellus fulgens (Houart, 1988)
- Timbellus goniodes Houart & Héros, 2015
- Timbellus guesti (Harasewych & Jensen, 1979)
- Timbellus havanensis (Vokes, 1970)
- † Timbellus kaiparaensis (C. A. Fleming, 1962)
- †Timbellus laetificus (Finlay, 1930)
- † Timbellus latifolius (Bellardi, 1872)
- Timbellus leucas (Locard, 1897)
- Timbellus levii (Houart, 1988)
- Timbellus lightbourni (Harasewych & Jensen, 1979)
- Timbellus marshalli (Houart, 1989)
- † Timbellus micropterus (Deshayes, 1835)
- † Timbellus moguntiacus (R. Janssen, 1979)
- Timbellus pannuceus Houart & Héros, 2015
- † Timbellus perlongus (Bellardi, 1873)
- Timbellus phaneus (Dall, 1889)
- Timbellus phyllopterus (Lamarck, 1822)
- Timbellus priabonicus Pacaud, 2018
- Timbellus radwini (Harasewych & Jensen, 1979)
- Timbellus richeri (Houart, 1987)
- Timbellus rubidus (Houart, 2001)
- Timbellus stenostoma (Houart, 1991)
- Timbellus sublimis Houart, 2012
- † Timbellus swainsoni (Michelotti, 1841)
- † Timbellus tripteroides (Lamarck, 1822)
- Timbellus vespertilio (Kuroda in Kira, 1959)
- † Timbellus waiareka (Beu, 1970)
- Timbellus xenos (Harasewych, 1982)

Species brought into synonymy

- Timbellus concavopterus (Kosuge, 1980): synonym of Favartia concavoptera (Kosuge, 1980) (superseded combination)
- Timbellus miyokoae (Kosuge, 1979): synonym of Chicoreus miyokoae (Kosuge, 1979)
