= Timbellus havanensis =

Scientific classification
- Kingdom: Animalia
- Phylum: Mollusca
- Class: Gastropoda
- Subclass: Caenogastropoda
- Order: Neogastropoda
- Family: Muricidae
- Genus: Timbellus
- Species: T. havanensis

Binomial name
- Timbellus havanensis (Vokes, 1970à

Synonyms
- Murex (Pteronotus) tristichus Dall, 1889; Murex pygmaeus Bush, K.J., 1893; Pteropurpura tristica Dall, W.H., 1927; Pterynotus (Pterynotus) bushae Vokes, E.H., 1970; Pterynotus havanensis Vokes, 1970 (basionym)

Species of gastropod

Timbellus havanensis is a species of sea snail, a marine gastropod mollusk in the family Muricidae, the murex snails or rock snails.

== Description ==
The size of an adult shell varies between 7 mm and 35 mm.

== Distribution ==
This species can be found in the Caribbean Sea and in the Gulf of Mexico; in the Atlantic Ocean from South Carolina to Brazil.
