= Pteropurpura deroyana =

Scientific classification
- Kingdom: Animalia
- Phylum: Mollusca
- Class: Gastropoda
- Subclass: Caenogastropoda
- Order: Neogastropoda
- Family: Muricidae
- Genus: Pteropurpura
- Species: P. deroyana

Binomial name
- Pteropurpura deroyana Berry, 1968

Species of gastropod

Pteropurpura deroyana is a species of sea snail, a marine gastropod mollusk in the family Muricidae, the murex snails or rock snails.
