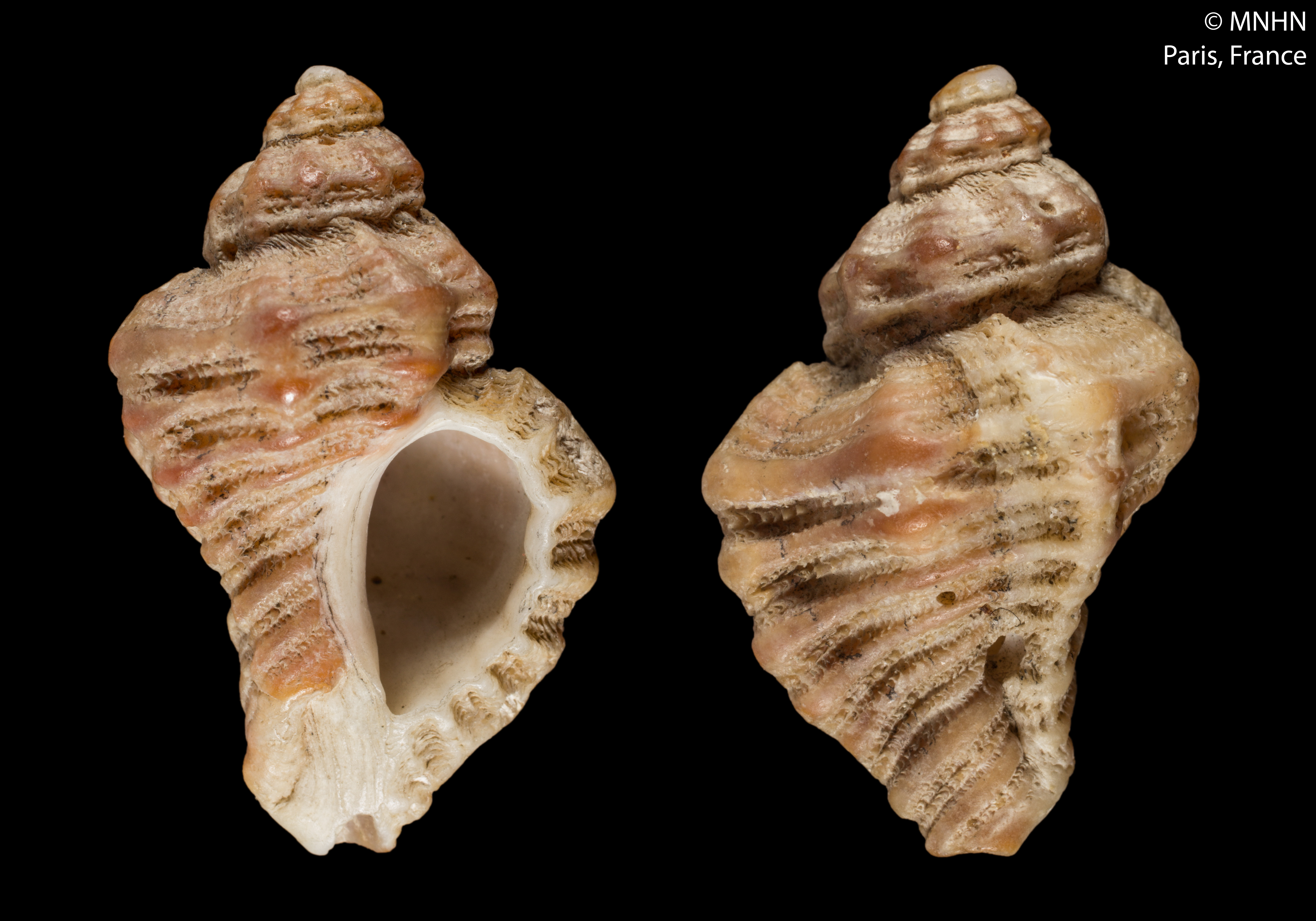
- Shell of Pteropurpura erinaceoides (syntype at MNHN, Paris)

Scientific classification
- Kingdom: Animalia
- Phylum: Mollusca
- Class: Gastropoda
- Subclass: Caenogastropoda
- Order: Neogastropoda
- Family: Muricidae
- Genus: Pteropurpura
- Species: P. erinaceoides

Binomial name
- Pteropurpura erinaceoides (Valenciennes, 1832)

Synonyms
- Murex californicus Hinds, 1884; Murex erinaceoides Valenciennes, 1832; Muricidea erinaceoides (Valenciennes, 1832); Pteropurpura (Pteropurpura) erinaceoides (Valenciennes, 1832)· accepted, alternate representation

= Pteropurpura erinaceoides =

Species of gastropod

Pteropurpura erinaceoides is a species of sea snail, a marine gastropod mollusk in the family Muricidae, the murex snails or rock snails.
