= Timbellus lightbourni =

Scientific classification
- Kingdom: Animalia
- Phylum: Mollusca
- Class: Gastropoda
- Subclass: Caenogastropoda
- Order: Neogastropoda
- Family: Muricidae
- Genus: Timbellus
- Species: T. lightbourni

Binomial name
- Timbellus lightbourni (Harasewych & Jensen, 1979)

Synonyms
- Pterynotus lightbourni Harasewych & Jensen, 1979 (basionym)

Species of sea snail

Timbellus lightbourni is a species of sea snail, a marine gastropod mollusk in the family Muricidae, the murex snails or rock snails.

== Description ==
The size of an adult shell varies between 25 mm and 39 mm.

== Distribution ==
This species is distributed in the Atlantic Ocean along the Bermudas.
