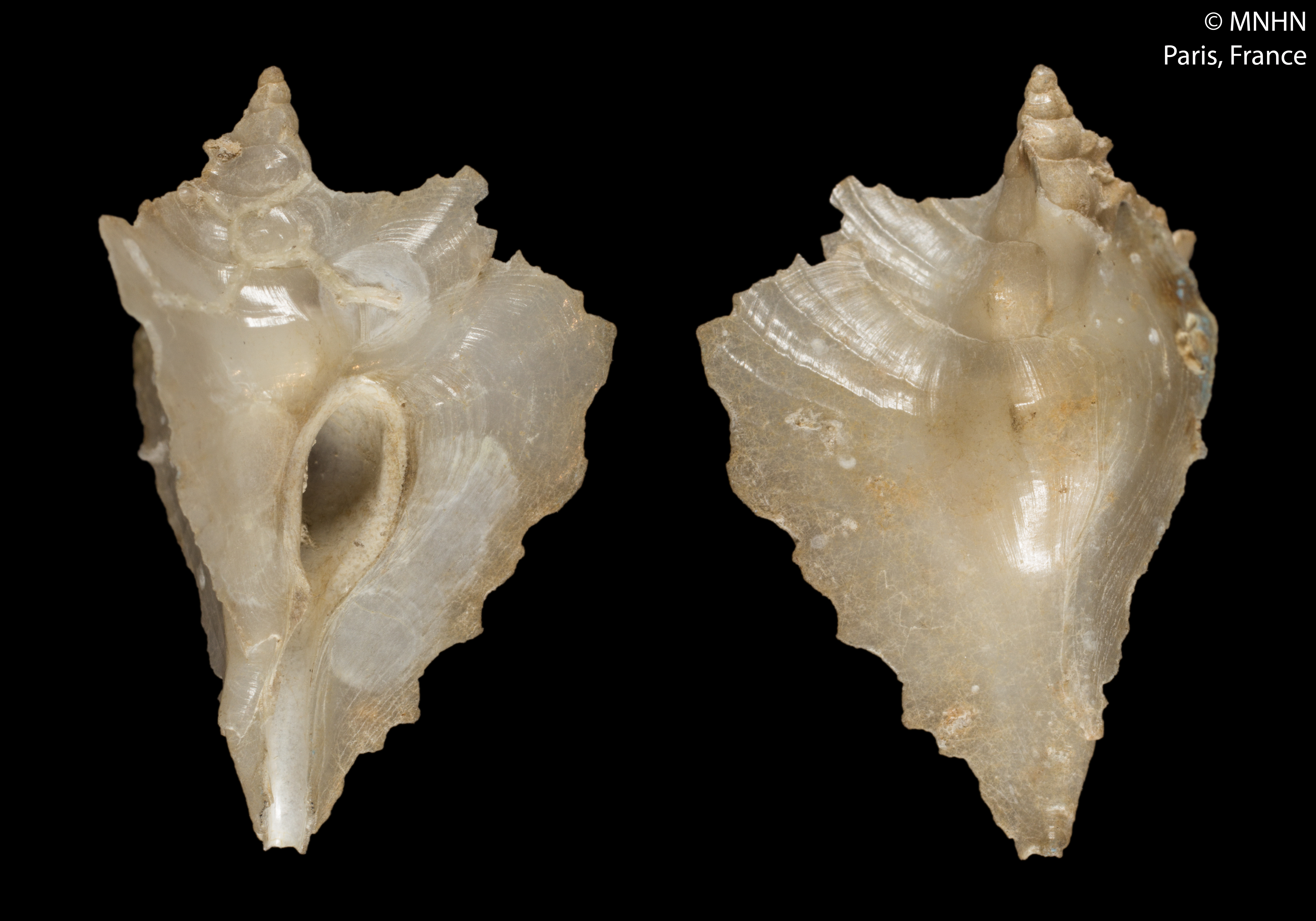
- Shell of Timbellus levii (specimen at MNHN, Paris)

Scientific classification
- Kingdom: Animalia
- Phylum: Mollusca
- Class: Gastropoda
- Subclass: Caenogastropoda
- Order: Neogastropoda
- Family: Muricidae
- Genus: Timbellus
- Species: T. levii

Binomial name
- Timbellus levii (Houart, 1988)

Synonyms
- Pterynotus levii Houart, 1988 (basionym)

= Timbellus levii =

Species of gastropod

Timbellus levii is a species of sea snail, a marine gastropod mollusk in the family Muricidae, the murex snails or rock snails.

== Description ==
The shell grows to a length of 20 mm.

== Distribution ==
This species is found in the Pacific Ocean along New Caledonia.
