= Timbellus emilyae =

Scientific classification
- Kingdom: Animalia
- Phylum: Mollusca
- Class: Gastropoda
- Subclass: Caenogastropoda
- Order: Neogastropoda
- Family: Muricidae
- Genus: Timbellus
- Species: T. emilyae

Binomial name
- Timbellus emilyae (Espinosa, Ortea & Fernandez-Garcés, 2007)

Synonyms
- Pterynotus emilyae Espinosa, Ortea & Fernández-Garcés, 2007 (original combination)

Species of gastropod

Timbellus emilyae is a species of sea snail, a marine gastropod mollusk in the family Muricidae, the murex snails or rock snails.

== Distribution ==
This marine species occurs off Cuba.
