= Pteropurpura modesta =

Scientific classification
- Kingdom: Animalia
- Phylum: Mollusca
- Class: Gastropoda
- Subclass: Caenogastropoda
- Order: Neogastropoda
- Family: Muricidae
- Genus: Pteropurpura
- Species: P. modesta

Binomial name
- Pteropurpura modesta (Fulton, 1936)

Synonyms
- Ocenebra (Ocinebrellus) modesta Fulton, 1936

Species of gastropod

Pteropurpura modesta is a species of sea snail, a marine gastropod mollusk in the family Muricidae, the murex snails or rock snails.
