= Pteropurpura centrifuga =

Scientific classification
- Kingdom: Animalia
- Phylum: Mollusca
- Class: Gastropoda
- Subclass: Caenogastropoda
- Order: Neogastropoda
- Family: Muricidae
- Genus: Pteropurpura
- Species: P. centrifuga

Binomial name
- Pteropurpura centrifuga (Hinds, 1844)

Synonyms
- Murex centrifuga Hinds, 1844; Murex speciosus A. Adams, 1855; Pterynotus swansoni Hertlein & Strong, 1951

Species of gastropod

Pteropurpura centrifuga is a species of sea snail, a marine gastropod mollusk in the family Muricidae, the murex snails or rock snails.

== Description ==
Most shells measure 60–75 mm in length, large specimens range from 80 to 90+ mm. The shells may be white or white with yellow/brown bands. On adult shells, the last growth ridges have 3–4 long spines clustered together into a ridge along the back.

== Distribution ==
Like many other species of preropurapura, is primarily found between the temperate to subtropical California marine province and the tropical Panamic marine province. They are well documented from the area of Los Angeles Bay and Guaymas in the Gulf of California south to Playa Gauyas Provence, Ecuador. They've been found in different substrates such as sandy mud, course sand, or shells. They are sometimes taken by shrimpers.
