= Pteropurpura benderskyi =

Scientific classification
- Kingdom: Animalia
- Phylum: Mollusca
- Class: Gastropoda
- Subclass: Caenogastropoda
- Order: Neogastropoda
- Family: Muricidae
- Genus: Pteropurpura
- Species: P. benderskyi

Binomial name
- Pteropurpura benderskyi Emerson & D'Attilio, 1979

Synonyms
- Pteropurpura benderskyi Emerson & d'Attilio

Species of gastropod

Pteropurpura benderskyi is a species of sea snail, a marine gastropod mollusk in the family Muricidae, the murex snails or rock snails.
