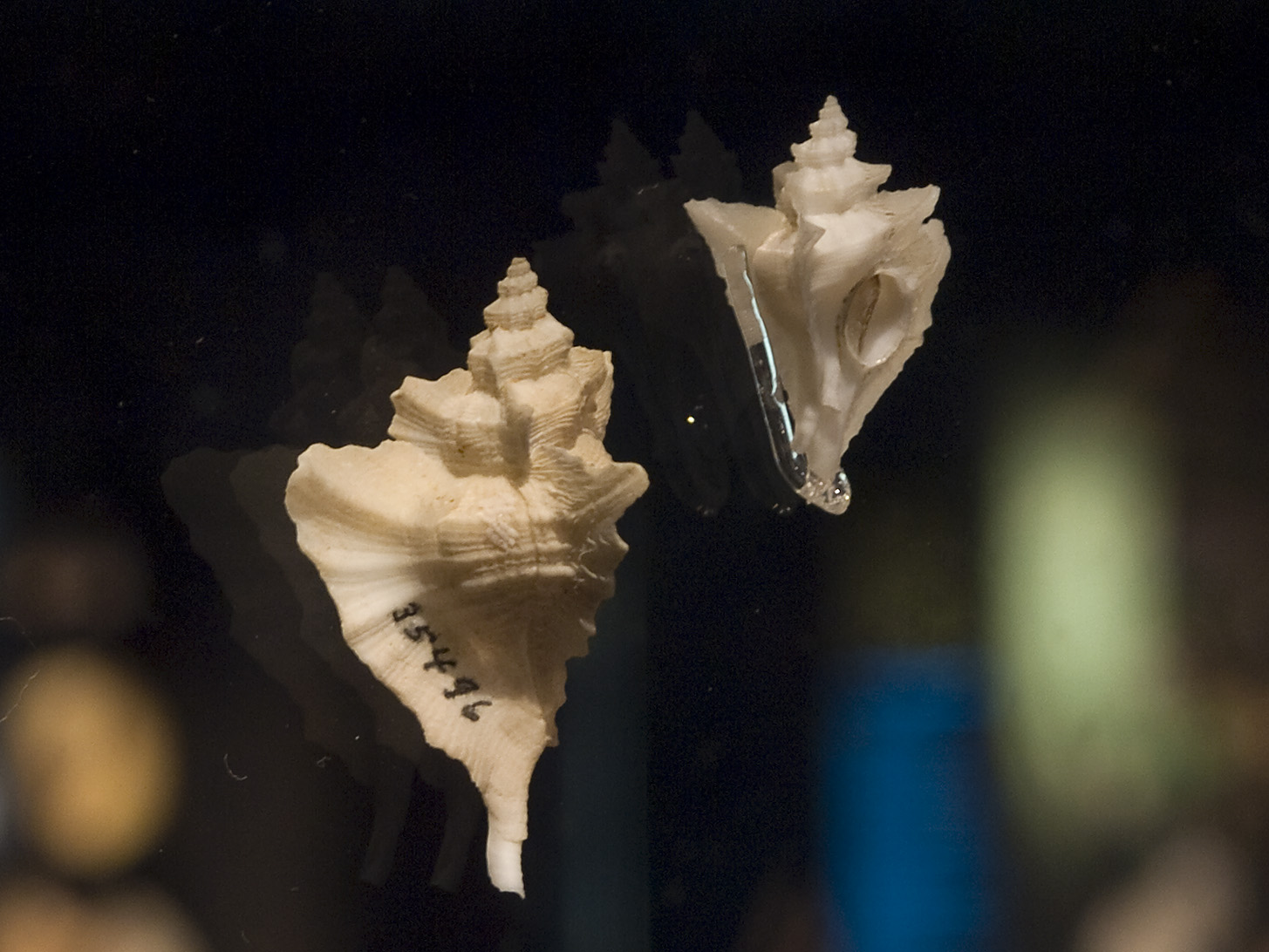

Scientific classification
- Kingdom: Animalia
- Phylum: Mollusca
- Class: Gastropoda
- Subclass: Caenogastropoda
- Order: Neogastropoda
- Family: Muricidae
- Genus: Pteropurpura
- Species: P. bequaerti

Binomial name
- Pteropurpura bequaerti Clench & Farfante, 1945

= Pteropurpura bequaerti =

Species of gastropod

Pteropurpura bequaerti is a species of sea snail, a marine gastropod mollusk in the family Muricidae, the murex snails or rock snails.
