= Pteropurpura dearmata =

Scientific classification
- Kingdom: Animalia
- Phylum: Mollusca
- Class: Gastropoda
- Subclass: Caenogastropoda
- Order: Neogastropoda
- Family: Muricidae
- Genus: Pteropurpura
- Species: P. dearmata

Binomial name
- Pteropurpura dearmata (Odhner, 1922)

Synonyms
- Murex dearmatus Odhner, 1922

Species of gastropod

Pteropurpura dearmata is a species of sea snail, a marine gastropod mollusk in the family Muricidae (the murex snails or rock snails).
