= Timbellus marshalli =

Scientific classification
- Kingdom: Animalia
- Phylum: Mollusca
- Class: Gastropoda
- Subclass: Caenogastropoda
- Order: Neogastropoda
- Family: Muricidae
- Genus: Timbellus
- Species: T. marshalli

Binomial name
- Timbellus marshalli (Houart, 1989)

Synonyms
- Pterynotus marshalli Houart, 1989 (basionym)

Species of gastropod

Timbellus marshalli is a species of sea snail, a marine gastropod mollusk in the family Muricidae, the murex snails or rock snails.

== Description ==
The shell grows to a length of 25 mm (0.98 in).

== Distribution ==
This species is distributed in the Pacific Ocean along Norfolk Island.
