= Timbellus guesti =

Scientific classification
- Kingdom: Animalia
- Phylum: Mollusca
- Class: Gastropoda
- Subclass: Caenogastropoda
- Order: Neogastropoda
- Family: Muricidae
- Genus: Timbellus
- Species: T. guesti

Binomial name
- Timbellus guesti (Harasewych & Jensen, 1979)

Synonyms
- Pterynotus guesti Harasewych & Jensen, 1979 (basionym)

Species of gastropod

Timbellus guesti, common name : the Guest's murex, is a species of sea snail, a marine gastropod mollusk in the family Muricidae, the murex snails or rock snails.

== Description ==
The size of an adult shell varies between 23 mm and 29 mm.

== Distribution ==
This species is distributed in the Gulf of Mexico along the Florida Keys.
