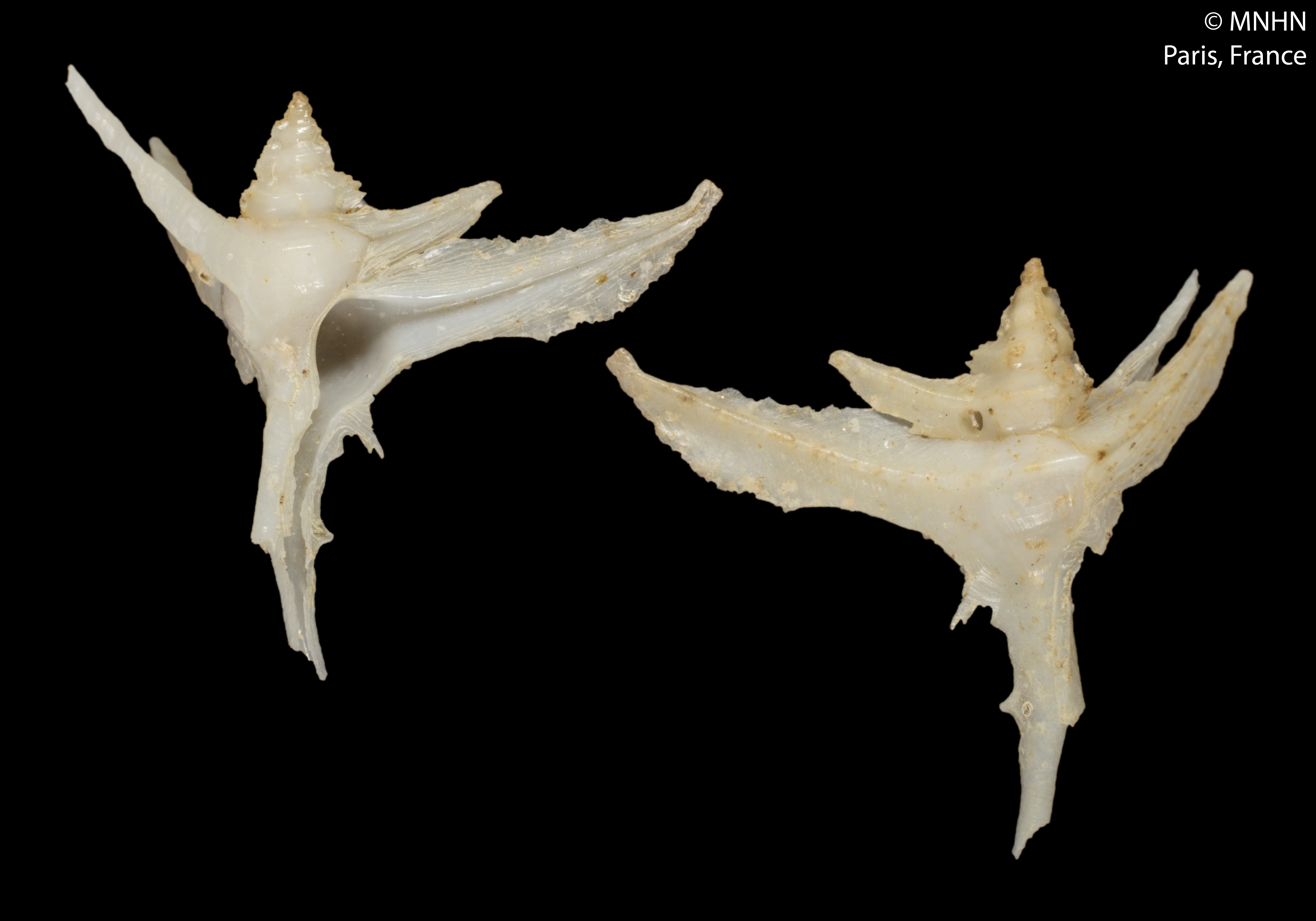
- Shell of Timbellus richeri (paratype aty MNHN, Paris)

Scientific classification
- Kingdom: Animalia
- Phylum: Mollusca
- Class: Gastropoda
- Subclass: Caenogastropoda
- Order: Neogastropoda
- Family: Muricidae
- Genus: Timbellus
- Species: T. richeri

Binomial name
- Timbellus richeri (Houart, 1986)

Synonyms
- Pterynotus richeri Houart, 1987 (basionym)

= Timbellus richeri =

Species of gastropod

Timbellus richeri is a species of sea snail, a marine gastropod mollusk in the family Muricidae, the murex snails or rock snails.

== Description ==
The shell is glossy white, apart from the spine channels which are lightly brown, and it grows to 31 mm high. The main opening from which the snail comes out of is egg-shaped, and it's slightly angular instead of being completely rounded. The spire is moderately high, consisting of 6 whorls. The inner edge of the shell's opening, the columellar lip, stands up rather than lying flatly. Toward the top part of the opening, the lip is fused flat against the previous coil of the shell, and the surface is smooth. There is no apparent anal notch, from which the snail would expel waste.

== Distribution ==
This marine species is found in the Coral Sea and off New Caledonia.
