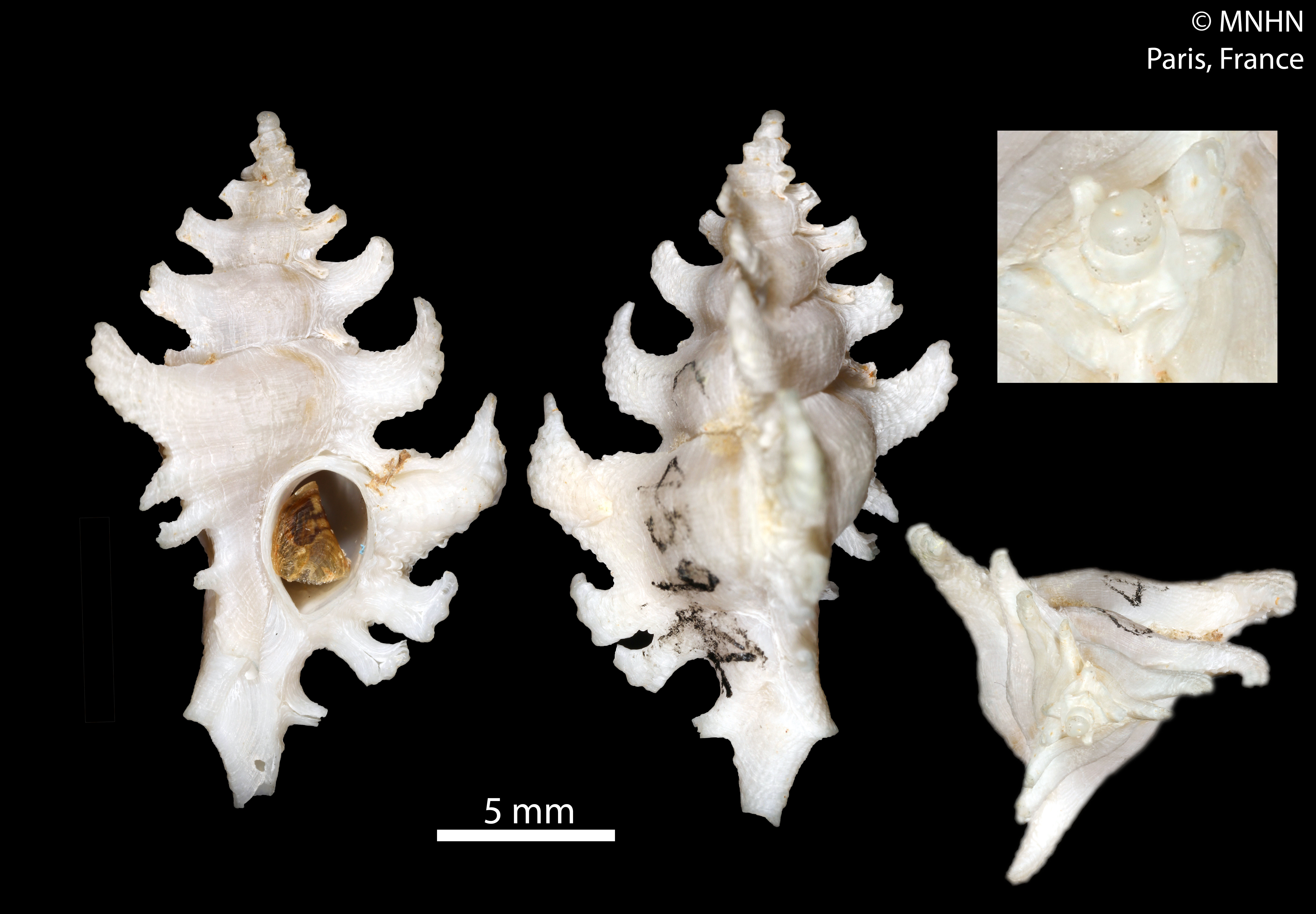
- Shell of Poropteron multicornis (paratype at MNHN, Paris)

Scientific classification
- Kingdom: Animalia
- Phylum: Mollusca
- Class: Gastropoda
- Subclass: Caenogastropoda
- Order: Neogastropoda
- Family: Muricidae
- Genus: Poropteron
- Species: P. multicornis

Binomial name
- Poropteron multicornis (Houart, 1991)

Synonyms
- Pteropurpura (Poropteron) multicornis Houart, 1991 (basionym); Pteropurpura multicornis Houart, 1991 (original combination)

= Poropteron multicornis =

Species of gastropod

Poropteron multicornis is a species of sea snail, a marine gastropod mollusc in the family Muricidae, the murex snails or rock snails.

== Distribution ==
This marine species occurs off East London, South Africa
