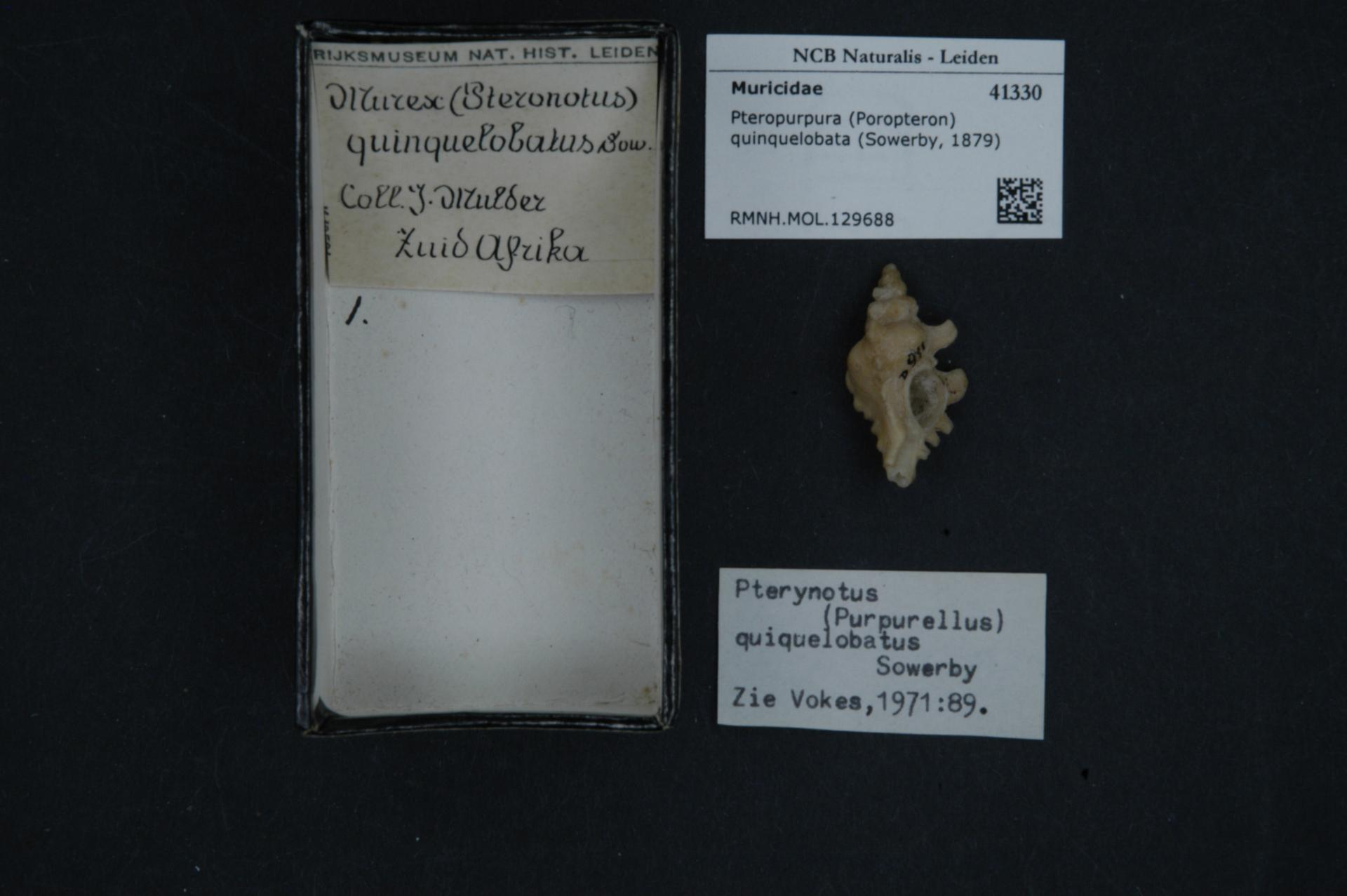

Scientific classification
- Kingdom: Animalia
- Phylum: Mollusca
- Class: Gastropoda
- Subclass: Caenogastropoda
- Order: Neogastropoda
- Family: Muricidae
- Genus: Poropteron
- Species: P. quinquelobatus

Binomial name
- Poropteron quinquelobatus (G.B. Sowerby II, 1879)

Synonyms
- Murex quinquelobatus G.B. Sowerby II, 1879t; Pteropurpura (Poropteron) joostei Lorenz, 1990; Pteropurpura (Poropteron) quinquelobata (G. B. Sowerby II, 1879); Pteropurpura joostei Lorenz, 1990; Pteropurpura quinquelobata (G. B. Sowerby II, 1879)

= Poropteron quinquelobatus =

Species of gastropod

Poropteron quinquelobatus is a species of sea snail, a marine gastropod mollusc in the family Muricidae, the murex snails or rock snails.
