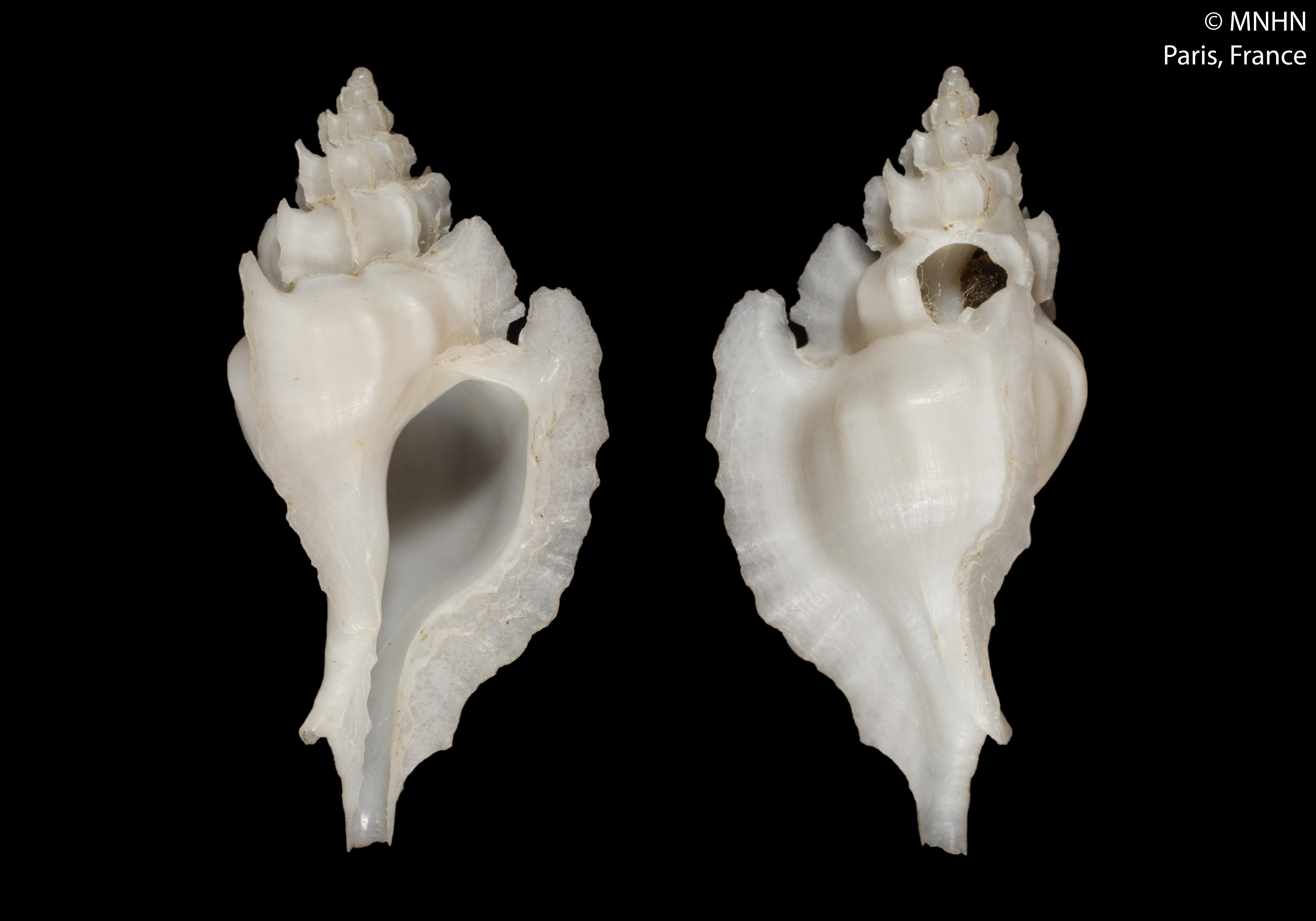
- Shell of Timbellus leucas (paralectotype at MNHN, Paris)

Scientific classification
- Kingdom: Animalia
- Phylum: Mollusca
- Class: Gastropoda
- Subclass: Caenogastropoda
- Order: Neogastropoda
- Family: Muricidae
- Genus: Timbellus
- Species: T. leucas

Binomial name
- Timbellus leucas (Locard, 1897)

Synonyms
- Murex leucas Fischer in Locard, 1897; Pterynotus leucas (Locard, 1897)

= Timbellus leucas =

Species of gastropod

Timbellus leucas is a species of sea snail, a marine gastropod mollusk in the family Muricidae, the murex snails or rock snails.

== Description ==
The size of an adult shell varies between 25 mm and 47 mm.

== Distribution ==
This species is found in European waters (along Madeira), in the Atlantic Ocean along Southern Morocco, and Senegal.
