= Poropteron debruini =

Scientific classification
- Kingdom: Animalia
- Phylum: Mollusca
- Class: Gastropoda
- Subclass: Caenogastropoda
- Order: Neogastropoda
- Family: Muricidae
- Genus: Poropteron
- Species: P. debruini

Binomial name
- Poropteron debruini (Lorenz, 1989)

Synonyms
- Pteropurpura (Poropteron) debruini Lorenz, 1989; Pteropurpura debruini Lorenz, 1989

Species of gastropod

Poropteron debruini is a species of sea snail, a marine gastropod mollusc in the family Muricidae, commonly known as murex snails or rock snails.
