= Poropteron uncinarius =

Scientific classification
- Kingdom: Animalia
- Phylum: Mollusca
- Class: Gastropoda
- Subclass: Caenogastropoda
- Order: Neogastropoda
- Family: Muricidae
- Genus: Poropteron
- Species: P. uncinarius

Binomial name
- Poropteron uncinarius (Lamarck, 1822)

Synonyms
- Murex capensis G.B. Sowerby II, 1841; Murex uncinarius Lamarck, 1822; Pteropurpura (Poropteron) uncinaria (Lamarck, 1822); Pteropurpura capensis (Sowerby II, 1841); Pteropurpura uncinaria

Species of gastropod

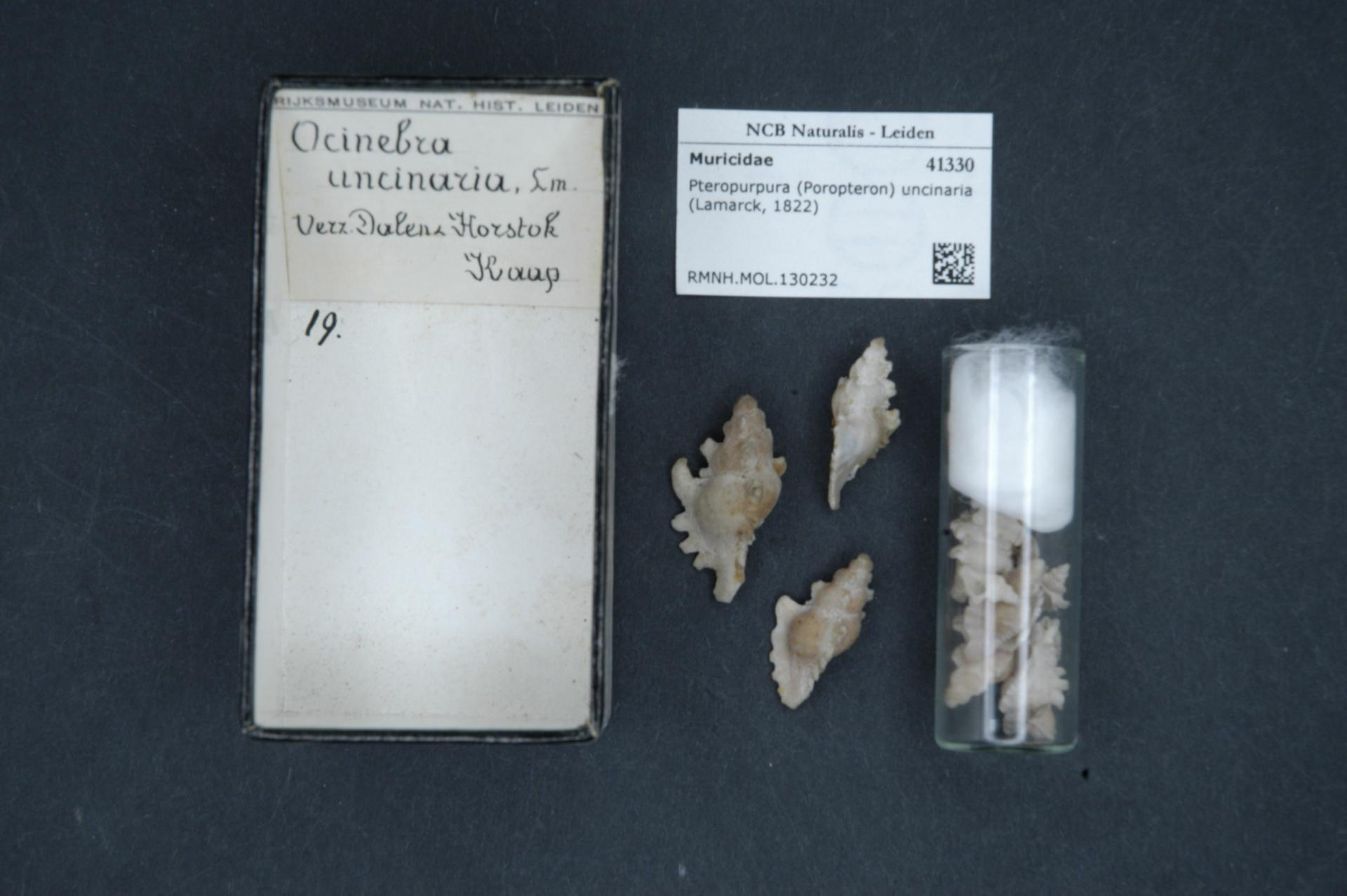

Poropteron uncinarius is a species of sea snail, a marine gastropod mollusc in the family Muricidae, the murex snails or rock snails.
