= Timbellus vespertilio =

Scientific classification
- Kingdom: Animalia
- Phylum: Mollusca
- Class: Gastropoda
- Subclass: Caenogastropoda
- Order: Neogastropoda
- Family: Muricidae
- Genus: Timbellus
- Species: T. vespertilio

Binomial name
- Timbellus vespertilio (Kuroda in Kira, 1959)

Synonyms
- Pteropurpura (Ceratostoma) vespertilio Kuroda in Kira, 1959 (basionym); Pterynotus vespertilio (Kuroda in Kira, 1959)

Species of gastropod

Timbellus vespertilio, common name: the butterfly murex, is a species of sea snail, a marine gastropod mollusk in the family Muricidae, the murex snails or rock snails.

== Description ==
The size of an adult shell varies between 17 mm and 50 mm.

== Distribution ==
This marine species is found in the Pacific Ocean along Southeast Japan and the Philippines.
