= Poropteron graagae =

Scientific classification
- Kingdom: Animalia
- Phylum: Mollusca
- Class: Gastropoda
- Subclass: Caenogastropoda
- Order: Neogastropoda
- Family: Muricidae
- Genus: Poropteron
- Species: P. graagae

Binomial name
- Poropteron graagae (Coen, 1943)

Synonyms
- Murex mitriformis G.B. Sowerby II, 1841 (invalid: junior homonym of Murex mitriformis Wood, 1828; Pteropurpura incurvispina Kilburn, 1970, is a replacement name); Pteropurpura (Poropteron) graagae (Coen, 1943); Pteropurpura (Poropteron) incurvispina Kilburn, 1970; Pteropurpura graagae (Coen, 1943); Pteropurpura incurvispina(Kilburn, 1970); Tritonalia graagae Coen, 1943

Species of gastropod

Poropteron graagae, common name the stag shell, is a species of sea snail, a marine gastropod mollusc in the family Muricidae, the murex snails or rock snails.

== Distribution ==
This marine species lives under rocks, 5–10 m. depth, Eastern Cape Province, South Africa.
