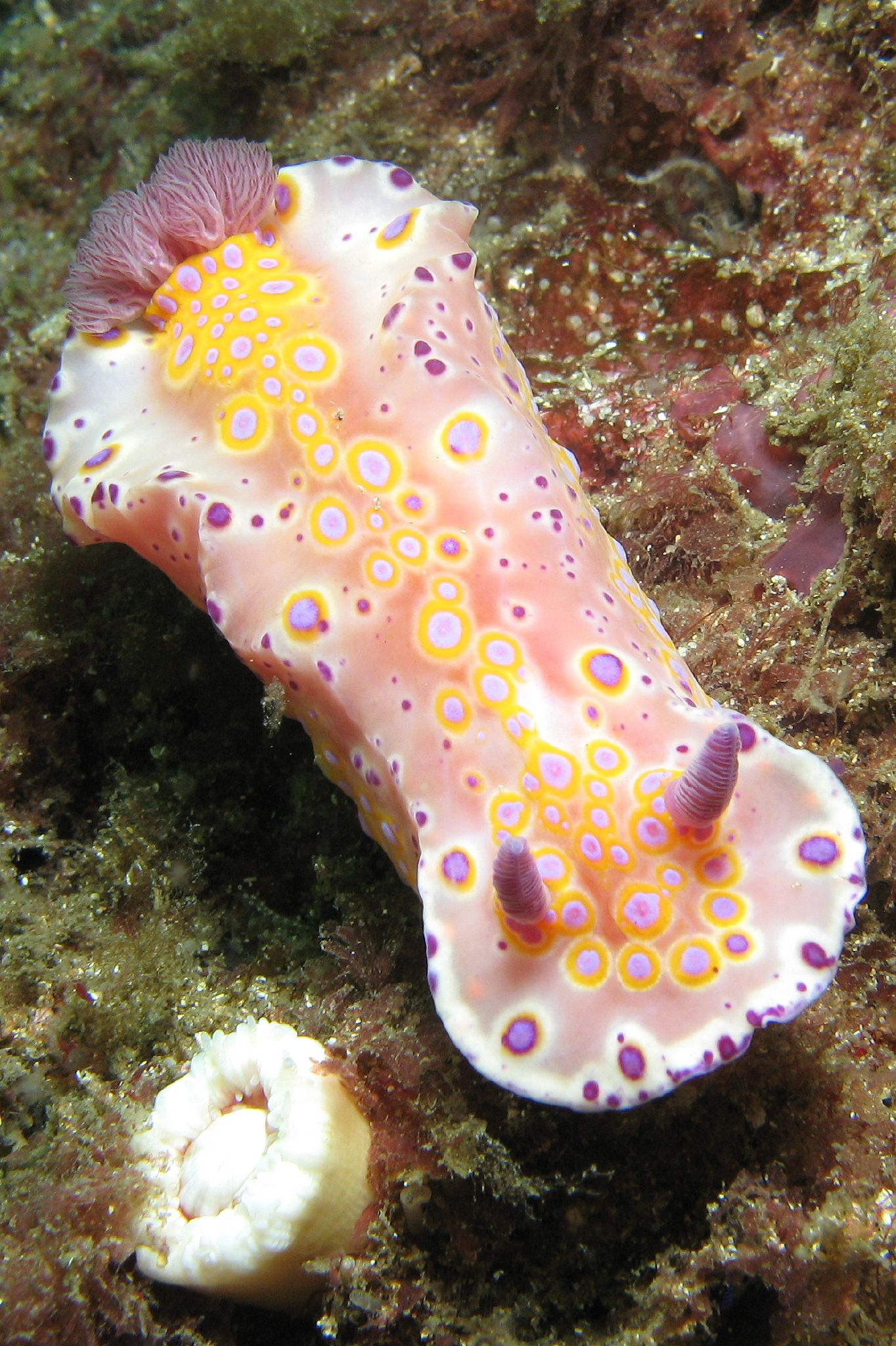
- Ceratosoma brevicaudatum

Scientific classification
- Kingdom: Animalia
- Phylum: Mollusca
- Class: Gastropoda
- Order: Nudibranchia
- Family: Chromodorididae
- Genus: Ceratosoma; J. E. Gray in M. E. Gray, 1850

Type species
- Ceratosoma trilobatum J. E. Gray

= Ceratosoma =

Genus of gastropods

Ceratosoma is a genus of sea slugs, dorid nudibranchs, shell-less marine gastropod mollusks in the family Chromodorididae.

== Taxonomic notes ==
This nudibranch genus is not to be confused with the muricid gastropod genus Ceratostoma. The type species is Ceratosoma cornigerum, accepted as Ceratosoma trilobatum (J.E. Gray, 1827)

== Species ==
Species in the genus Ceratosoma include:

- Ceratosoma amoenum (Cheeseman, 1886)
- Ceratosoma bicolor Baba, 1949 - possibly a colour form of Ceratosoma trilobatum
- Ceratosoma brevicaudatum Abraham, 1876
- Ceratosoma gracillimum Semper in Bergh, 1876
- Ceratosoma ingozi Gosliner, 1996 Inkspot nudibranch
- Ceratosoma palliolatum Rudman, 1988
- Ceratosoma polyomma Bergh, 1880
- Ceratosoma pustulosum (Cuvier, 1804)
- Ceratosoma tenue Abraham, 1876
- Ceratosoma trilobatum (J.E. Gray, 1827) synonyms: Ceratosoma cornigerum

Species brought into synonymy

- Ceratosoma adelaidae Basedow & Hedley, 1905 accepted as Ceratosoma brevicaudatum Abraham, 1876
- Ceratosoma alleni Gosliner, 1996 : synonym of Miamira alleni (Gosliner, 1996)
- Ceratosoma amoena [sic] accepted as Ceratosoma amoenum (Cheeseman, 1886)
- Ceratosoma berghi Rochebrune, 1895 accepted as Ceratosoma trilobatum (J.E. Gray, 1827)
- Ceratosoma bicorne Bergh, 1905 accepted as Ceratosoma tenue Abraham, 1876
- Ceratosoma caledonicum Fischer, 1876 accepted as Ceratosoma trilobatum (J.E. Gray, 1827)
- Ceratosoma corallinum Odhner, 1917 accepted as Ceratosoma trilobatum (J.E. Gray, 1827)
- Ceratosoma cornigerum (Adams & Reeve, 1850) accepted as Ceratosoma trilobatum (J.E. Gray, 1827)
- Ceratosoma flavicostatum Baba, 1940 : synonym of Miamira flavicostata Baba, 1940
- Ceratosoma francoisi Rochebrune, 1894 accepted as Ceratosoma tenue Abraham, 1876
- Ceratosoma gibbosum Rochebrune, 1894 accepted as Ceratosoma trilobatum (J.E. Gray, 1827)
- Ceratosoma jousseaumi Rochebrune, 1894 accepted as Ceratosoma tenue Abraham, 1876
- Ceratosoma lixi Rochebrune, 1894 accepted as Ceratosoma trilobatum (J.E. Gray, 1827)
- Ceratosoma magnifica [sic] accepted as Miamira magnifica Eliot, 1904
- Ceratosoma magnificum (Eliot, 1910) : synonym of Miamira magnifica Eliot, 1904
- Ceratosoma miamiranum Bergh, 1875 : synonym of Miamira miamirana (Bergh, 1875)
- Ceratosoma moloch Rudman, 1988 : synonym of Miamira moloch (Rudman, 1988)
- Ceratosoma oblongum Abraham, 1876 accepted as Ceratosoma brevicaudatum Abraham, 1876
- Ceratosoma ornatum Bergh, 1890 accepted as Ceratosoma tenue Abraham, 1876
- Ceratosoma rhopalicum Rochebrune, 1894 accepted as Ceratosoma tenue Abraham, 1876
- Ceratosoma sinuatum van Hasselt, 1824: synonym of Miamira sinuata (van Hasselt, 1824)
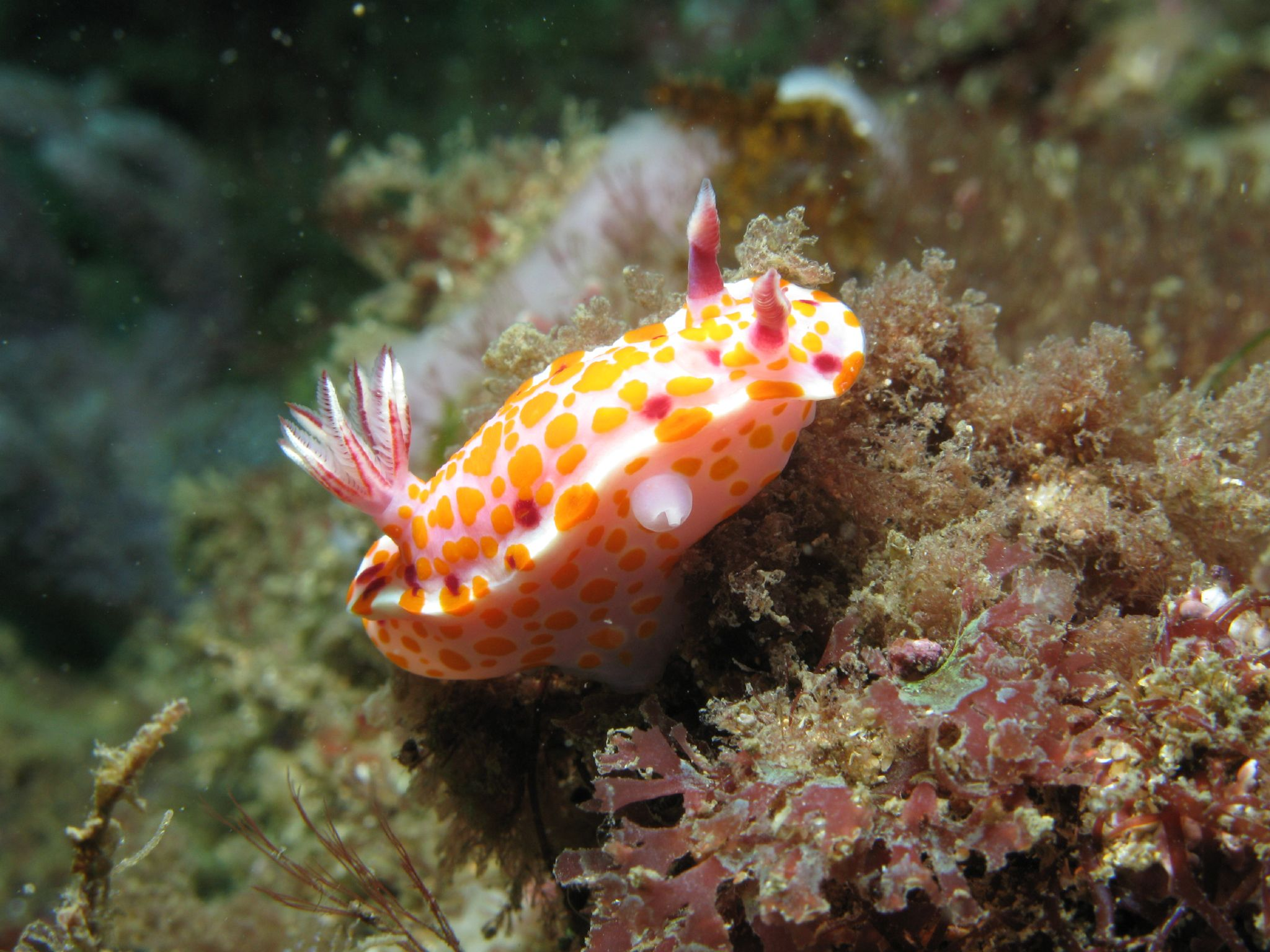
Ceratosoma amoenum

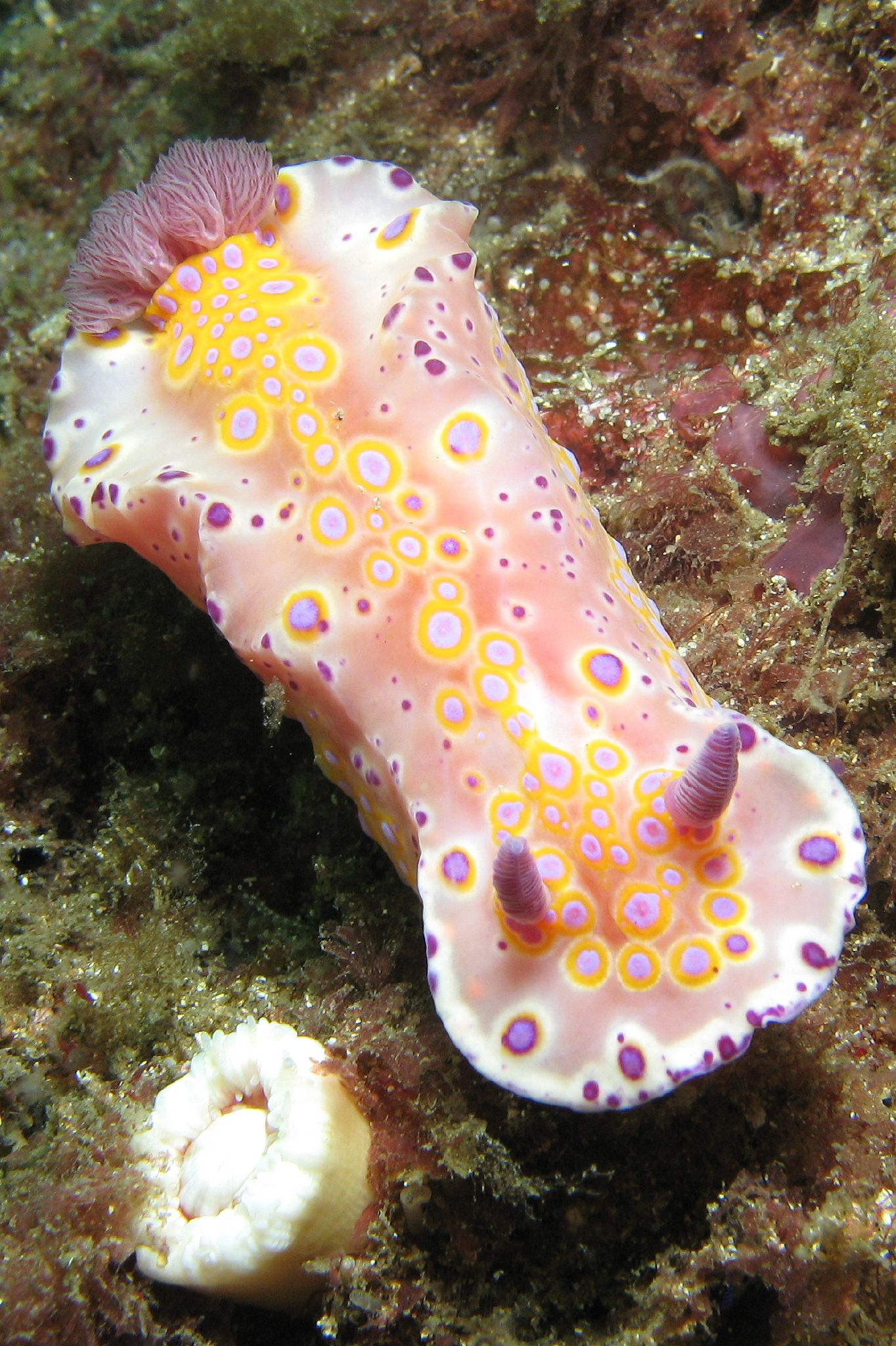
Ceratosoma brevicaudatum

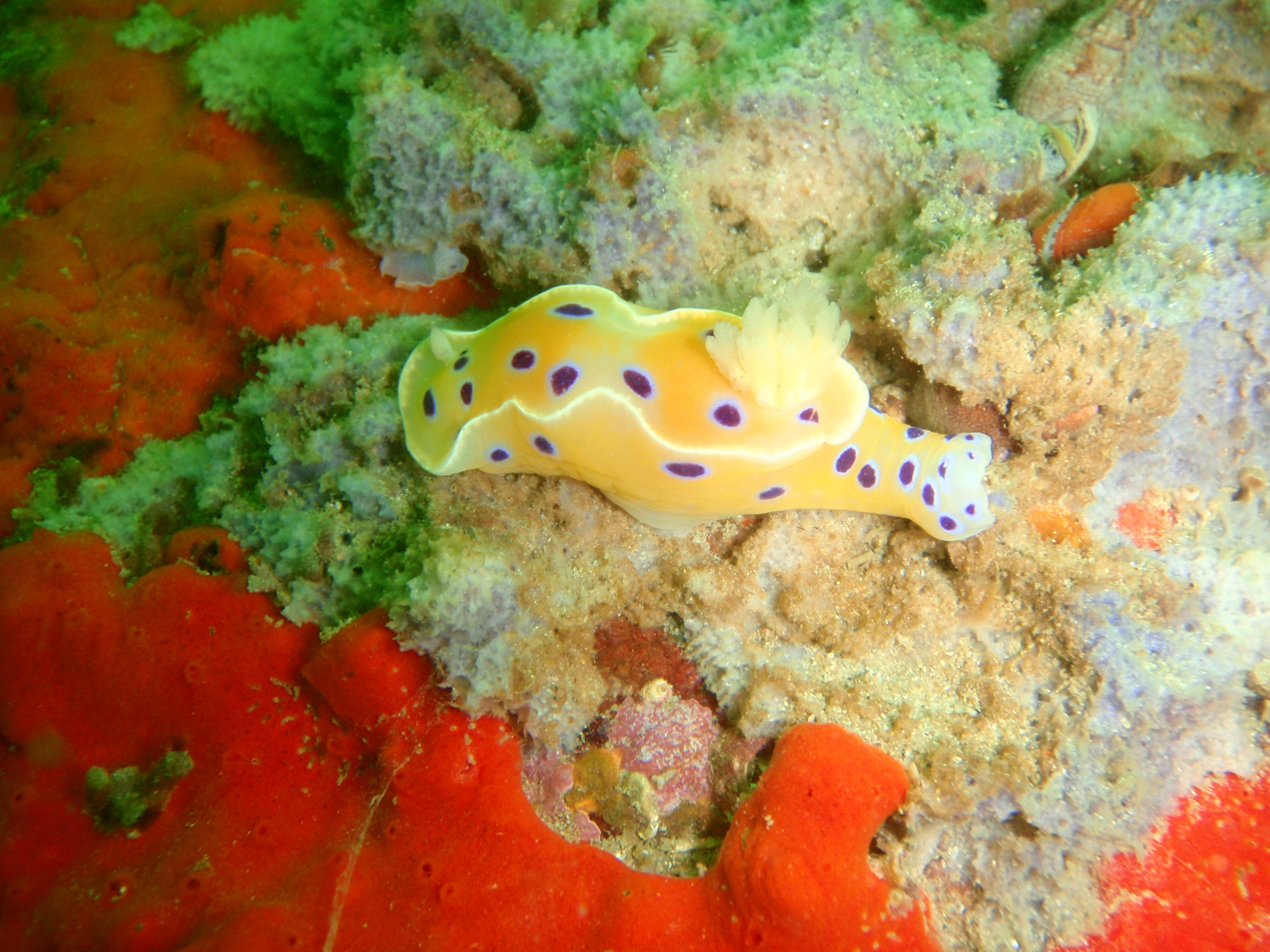
Ceratosoma ingozi

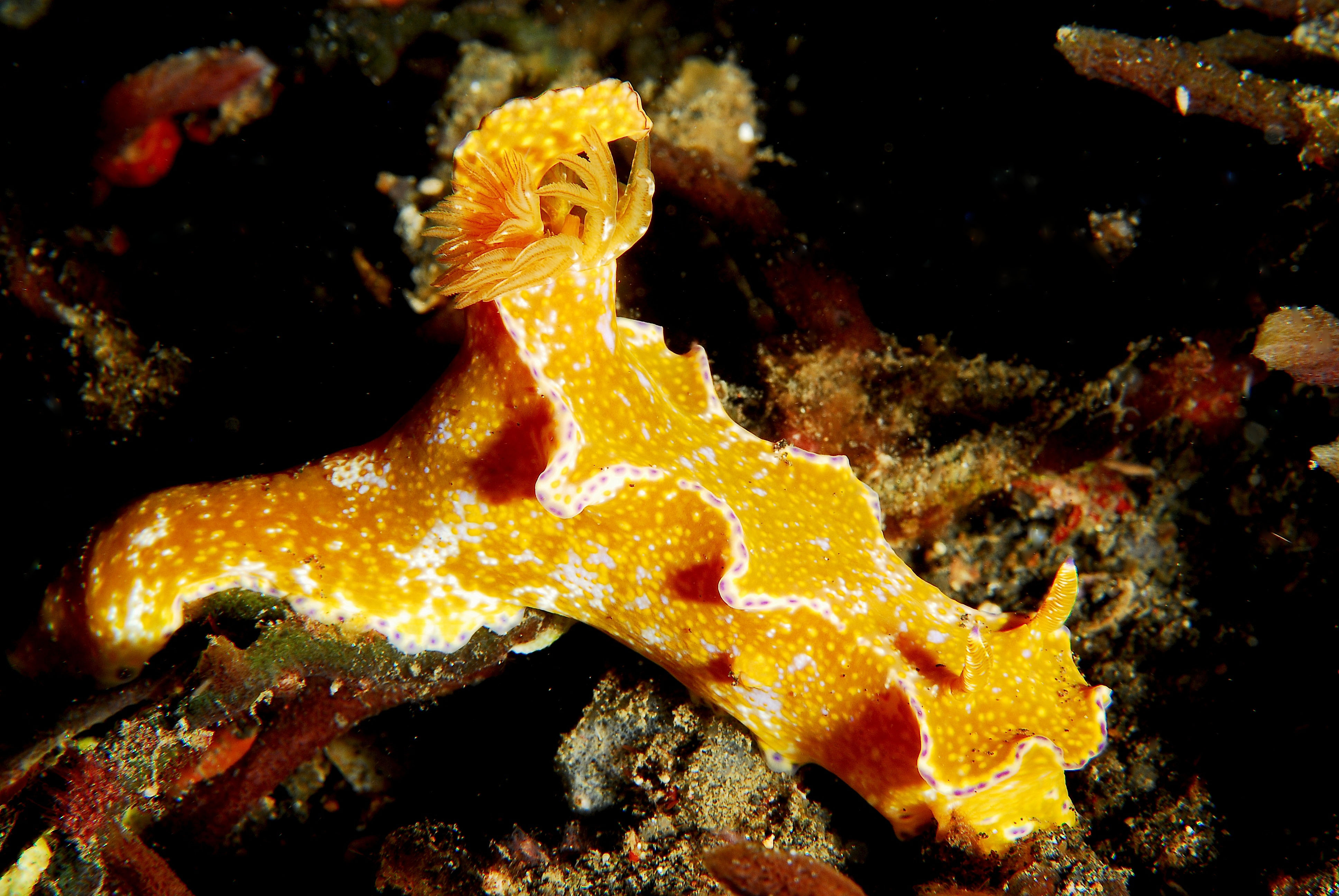
Ceratosoma tenue

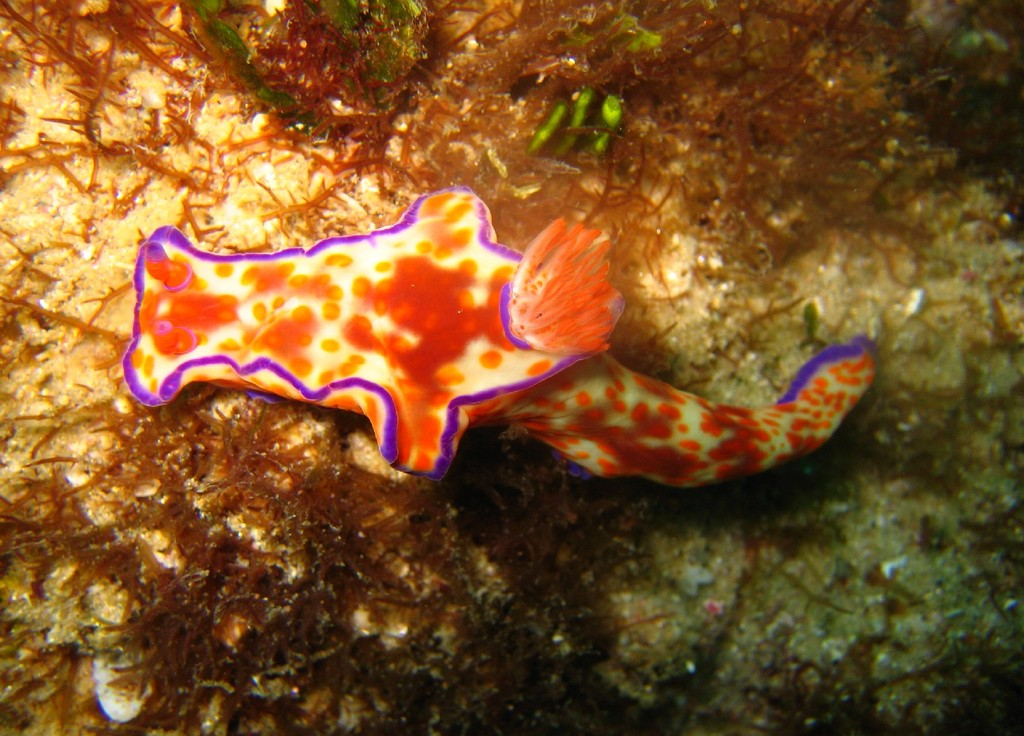
Ceratosoma trilobatum
