= Ceratosoma bicolor =

Scientific classification
- Kingdom: Animalia
- Phylum: Mollusca
- Class: Gastropoda
- Order: Nudibranchia
- Family: Chromodorididae
- Genus: Ceratosoma
- Species: C. bicolor

Binomial name
- Ceratosoma bicolor Baba, 1949

Species of gastropod

Ceratosoma bicolor is a species of sea slug or dorid nudibranch, a marine gastropod mollusk in the family Chromodorididae. It is possible that this species is a colour variation of Ceratosoma trilobatum

== Distribution ==
This species was described from Japan.

== Description ==
Anatomically indistinguishable from Ceratosoma trilobatum but with a distinctive colour pattern.
