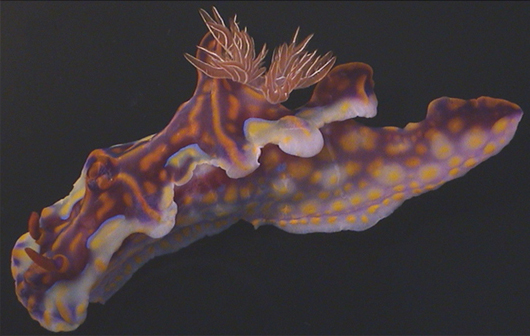

Scientific classification
- Kingdom: Animalia
- Phylum: Mollusca
- Class: Gastropoda
- Order: Nudibranchia
- Family: Chromodorididae
- Genus: Miamira
- Species: M. magnifica

Binomial name
- Miamira magnifica (Eliot, 1910)

Synonyms
- Ceratosoma magnifica (incorrect gender ending); Ceratosoma magnificum (Eliot, 1910)

= Miamira magnifica =

Species of gastropod

Miamira magnifica is a species of colourful dorid nudibranch, a sea slug, a shell-less marine gastropod mollusk in the family Chromodorididae. Previously synonymised with Ceratosoma this genus is considered valid on the basis of molecular phylogeny.

== Distribution ==
This species was described from the Seychelles.

== Description ==
The differences between this species and Miamira sinuata and Miamira flavicostata are not clear.
