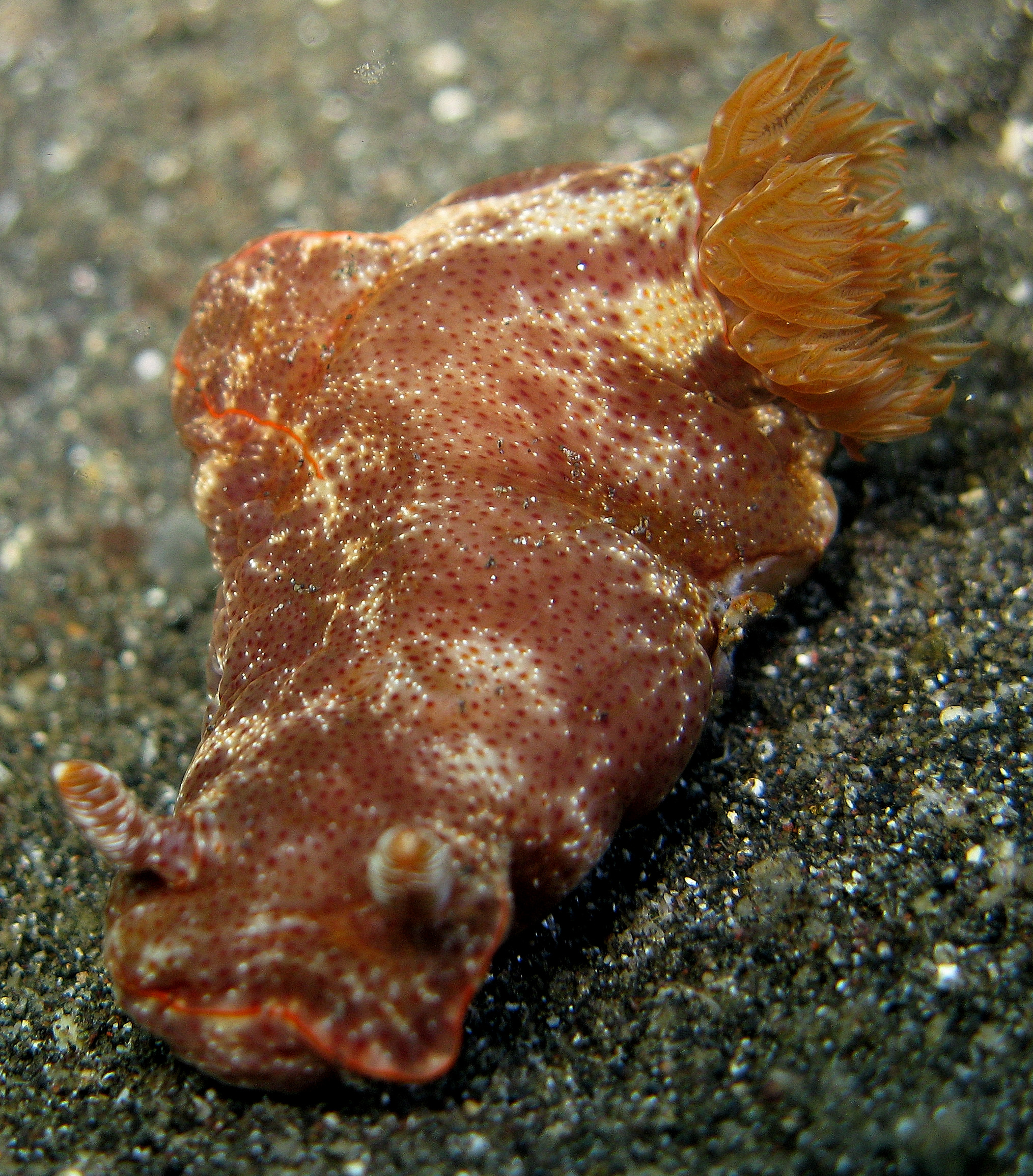

Scientific classification
- Kingdom: Animalia
- Phylum: Mollusca
- Class: Gastropoda
- Order: Nudibranchia
- Family: Chromodorididae
- Genus: Ceratosoma
- Species: C. gracillimum

Binomial name
- Ceratosoma gracillimum Bergh, 1876

= Ceratosoma gracillimum =

Species of sea slug

Ceratosoma gracillimum is a species of sea slug or dorid nudibranch, a marine gastropod mollusk in the family Chromodorididae.

== Description ==
It differs from Ceratosoma trilobatum by having no strong, consistent mantle ridge between the head and the lateral lobes.

== Distribution ==
This species was described from Bohol, Philippines. It is known from Indonesia, Vietnam and the Great Barrier Reef, Australia.
