= Ceratosoma pustulosum =

Scientific classification
- Kingdom: Animalia
- Phylum: Mollusca
- Class: Gastropoda
- Order: Nudibranchia
- Family: Chromodorididae
- Genus: Ceratosoma
- Species: C. pustulosum

Binomial name
- Ceratosoma pustulosum (Cuvier, 1804)

Synonyms
- Doris pustulosa Cuvier, 1804

Species of gastropod

Ceratosoma pustulosum is a species of sea slug or dorid nudibranch, a marine gastropod mollusk in the family Chromodorididae.

== Distribution ==
This species was described from Timor.

== Description ==
The type specimen of Ceratosoma pustulosum is in Muséum Nationale d'Histoire Naturelle, Paris and was studied by Pruvot-Fol. It is similar to Ceratosoma brevicaudatum but is unlikely to be the same species as this is a warm temperate species. It is currently not identifiable with any records since 1804.
