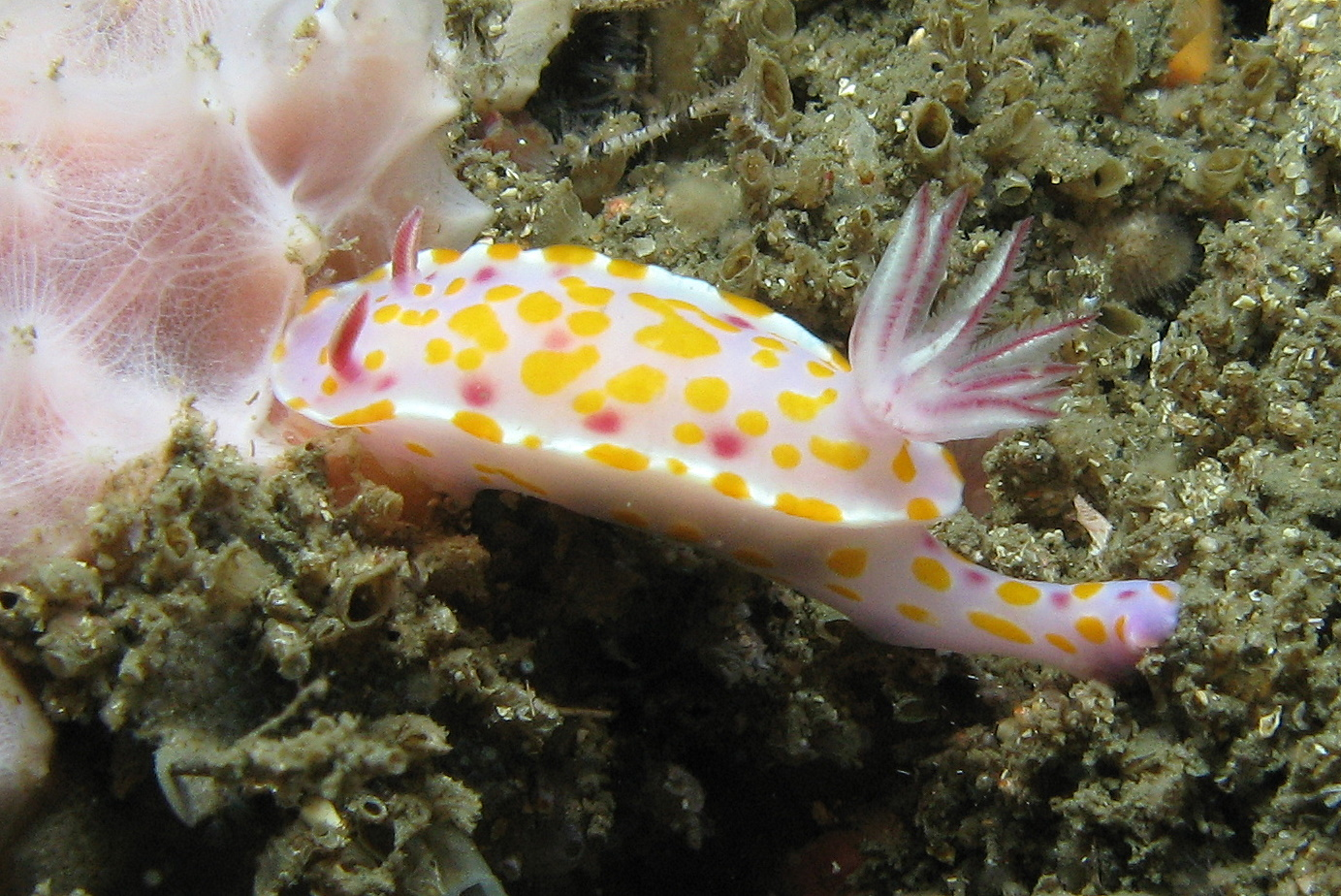

Scientific classification
- Kingdom: Animalia
- Phylum: Mollusca
- Class: Gastropoda
- Order: Nudibranchia
- Family: Chromodorididae
- Genus: Ceratosoma
- Species: C. amoenum

Binomial name
- Ceratosoma amoenum (Cheeseman, 1886)

Synonyms
- Ceratosoma amoena

= Ceratosoma amoenum =

Species of gastropod

Ceratosoma amoenum, or the clown nudibranch, is a species of colorful dorid nudibranch, a sea slug, a shell-less marine gastropod mollusk in the family Chromodorididae.

Following the gender rules of International Code of Zoological Nomenclature, the spelling of Ceratosoma amoena has been changed into Ceratosoma amoenum.

== Distribution ==
Ceratosoma amoenum is a common nudibranch found in the intertidal zones of temperate southern Australia and northern New Zealand. There have also been a few reported sightings off the coast of southern Queensland.

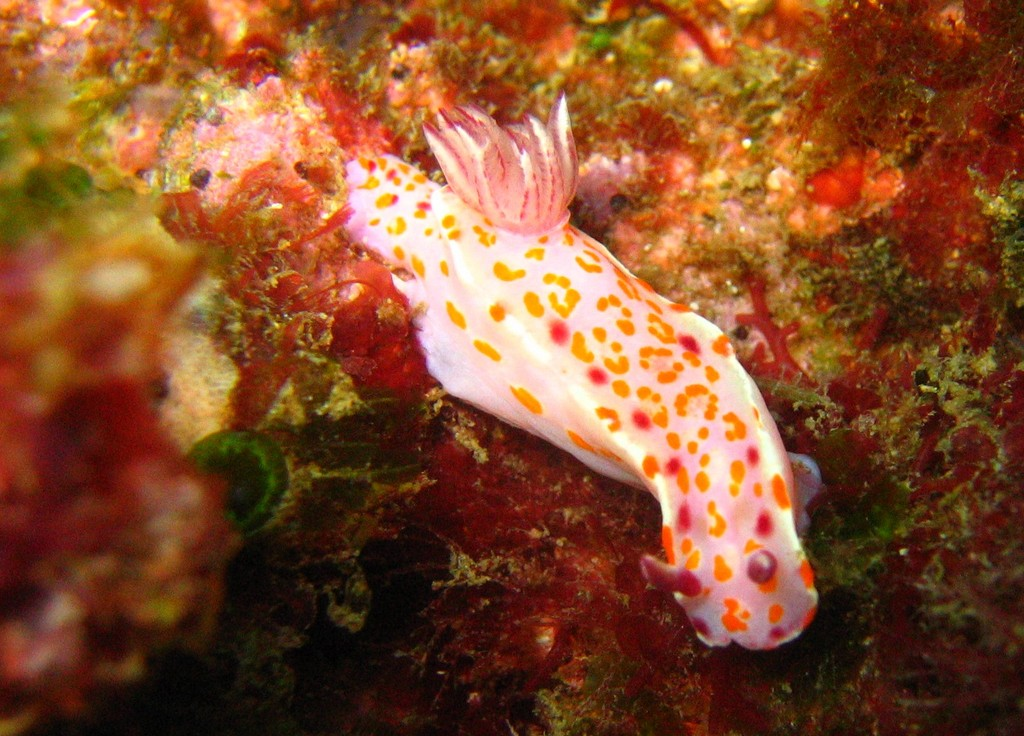
Ceratosoma amoenum

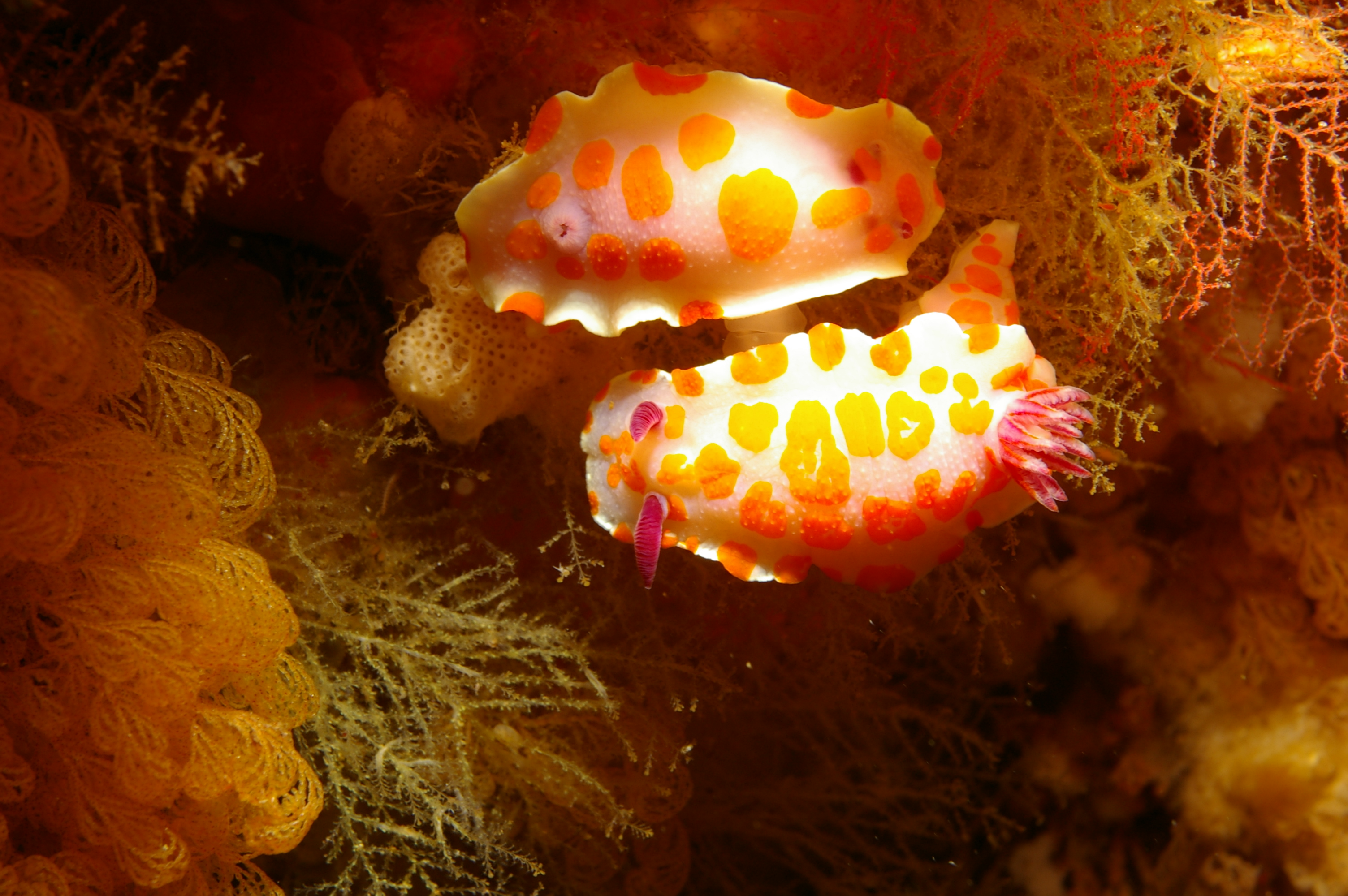
A pair of mating clown nudibranchs in the Poor Knights Islands, New Zealand.

== Description ==
This species has a white body which is elaborately patterned with orange and purple spots especially on the dorsum. The size of the spots varies according to range, with those individuals in New Zealand having the largest. There is some variation in the patterning of this species. The gills and rhinophores are crimson-white in color and both the rhinophores and the unbranched gills can be retracted into pockets. At the rear of the mantle there is a large concentration of mantle glands. This species reaches at least 60 mm in length.

== Ecology ==
Ceratosoma amoenum is known to feed on sponges. It has been seen feeding on sponges from the genus Semitaspongia and the species Dysidea fragilis. It sequesters metabolites from its prey as a defense mechanism.
