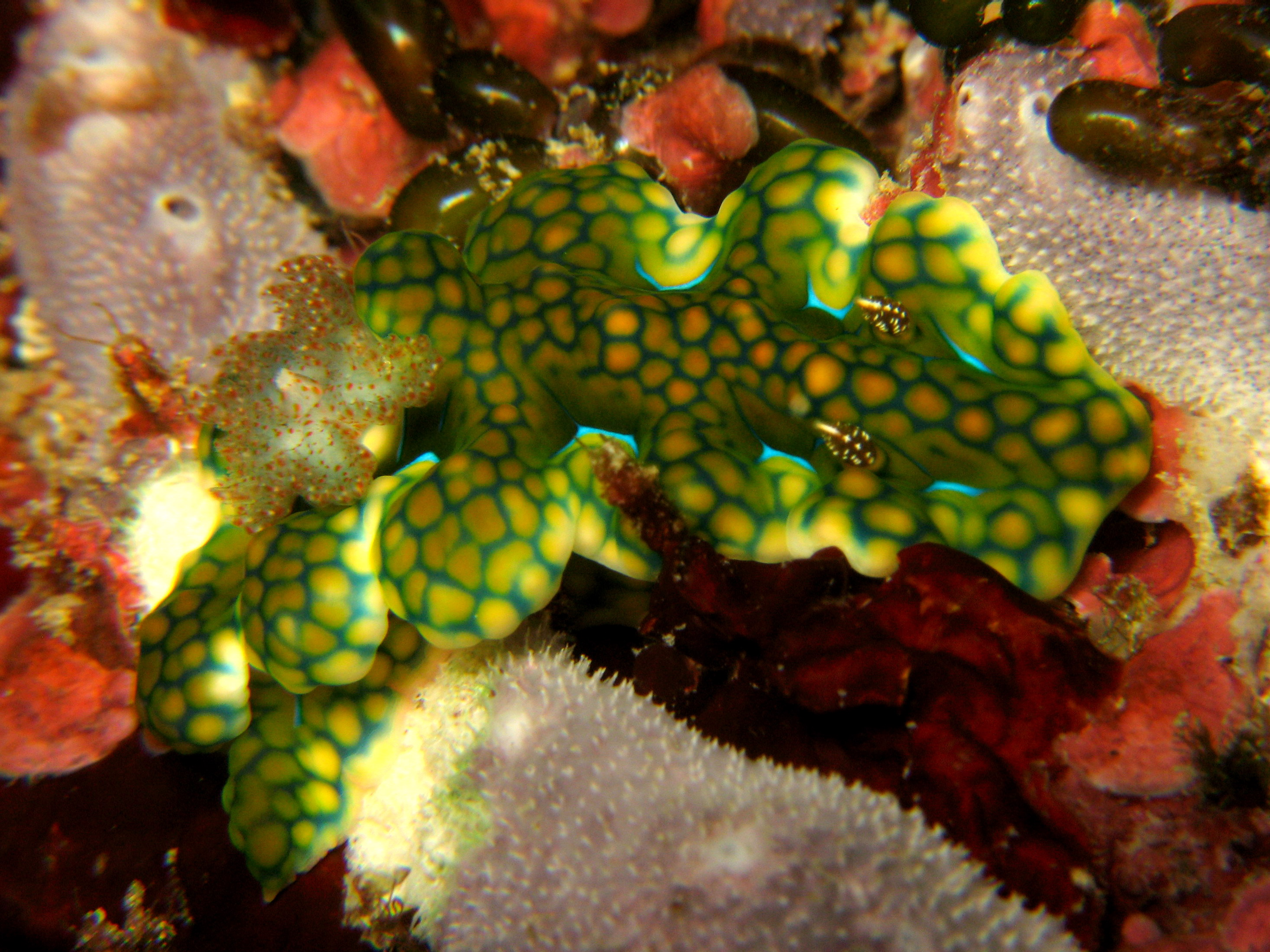
- An individual of Miamira sinuata from Guam, head end towards the right

Scientific classification
- Domain: Eukaryota
- Kingdom: Animalia
- Phylum: Mollusca
- Class: Gastropoda
- Order: Nudibranchia
- Family: Chromodorididae
- Genus: Miamira
- Species: M. sinuata

Binomial name
- Miamira sinuata (van Hasselt, 1824)

Synonyms
- Ceratosoma sinuatum (van Hasselt, 1824); Doris sinuata van Hasselt, 1824 (basionym); Miamira nobilis Bergh, 1874

= Miamira sinuata =

Species of gastropod

Miamira sinuata is a species of colorful dorid nudibranch, a sea slug, a shell-less marine gastropod mollusk in the family Chromodorididae. This species is found in the Indo-Pacific.

== Distribution ==
This species is reported from the central Indo-Pacific including the Philippines, Taiwan, Indonesia and eastern Australia. It is very variable in colour and it is not certain whether Miamira flavicostata and Miamira magnifica are distinct species.

== Description ==
Miamira sinuata has a mottled appearance with a bright green to purplish brown reticulation. The whole body is covered with low rounded yellow tubercles and there are a few aquamarine spots placed at the sides of the mantle in most individuals. The gills and the rhinophores are translucent greenish or brownish with scattered white spots. The front of the mantle has a central lobe and two lateral lobes.
