= Ceratosoma palliolatum =

Scientific classification
- Kingdom: Animalia
- Phylum: Mollusca
- Class: Gastropoda
- Order: Nudibranchia
- Family: Chromodorididae
- Genus: Ceratosoma
- Species: C. palliolatum

Binomial name
- Ceratosoma palliolatum Rudman, 1988

Species of gastropod

Ceratosoma palliolatum is a species of sea slug or dorid nudibranch, a marine gastropod mollusk in the family Chromodorididae.

== Distribution ==
This species was described from Darwin, Northern Territory, Australia.
