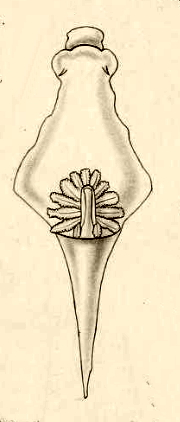
- Drawing of Ceratosoma polyomma (holotype)

Scientific classification
- Kingdom: Animalia
- Phylum: Mollusca
- Class: Gastropoda
- Order: Nudibranchia
- Family: Chromodorididae
- Genus: Ceratosoma
- Species: C. polyomma

Binomial name
- Ceratosoma polyomma Bergh, 1880

= Ceratosoma polyomma =

Species of sea slug

Ceratosoma polyomma is a species of sea slug or dorid nudibranch, a marine gastropod mollusc in the family Chromodorididae.

== Taxonomic history and distribution ==
This species was described by the Danish malacologist Rudolph Bergh in 1880. The original description was published in a supplementary volume of Malacologische Untersuchungen, based on marine specimens collected during the expeditions of German zoologist Carl Semper in the Philippines and surrounding waters of the Indo-Pacific.
