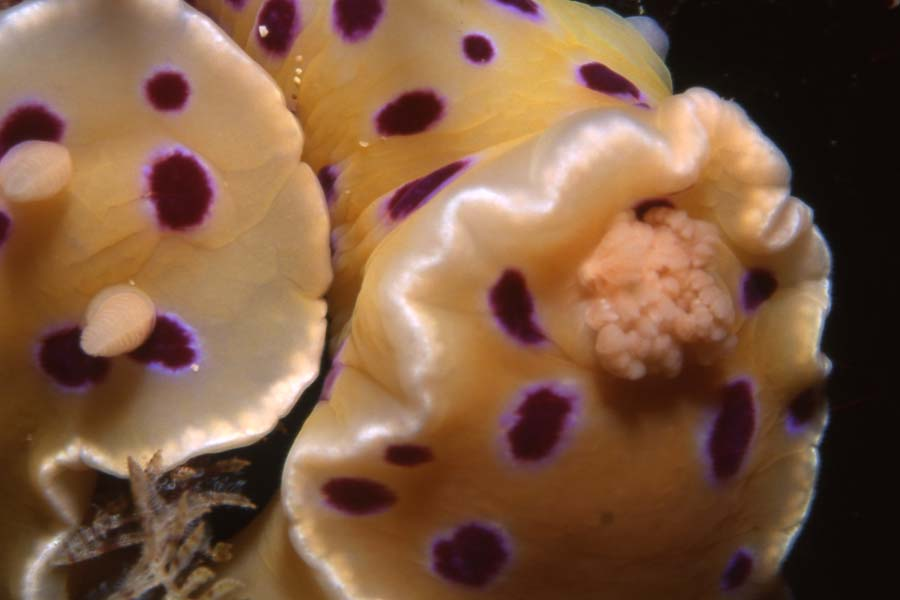

Scientific classification
- Kingdom: Animalia
- Phylum: Mollusca
- Class: Gastropoda
- Order: Nudibranchia
- Family: Chromodorididae
- Genus: Ceratosoma
- Species: C. ingozi

Binomial name
- Ceratosoma ingozi Gosliner, 1996

= Inkspot nudibranch =

Species of gastropod

The inkspot nudibranch, Ceratosoma ingozi, is a species of colourful sea slug, a dorid nudibranch. It is a marine gastropod mollusc in the family Chromodorididae.

== Distribution ==
This species has so far only been found around the southern African coast from the Cape Peninsula to Port Elizabeth in 15–108 m of water. It is probably endemic.

== Description ==
The length of this marine species attains 80 mm.

The inkspot nudibranch is a deep-bodied dorid with a smooth skin and bluish-edged purple spots. It has creamy gills and rhinophores. Its body colour varies from a creamy yellow through pinks to purples. It may reach a total length of 80 mm.

== Distinguishing features ==
It is bright orange in color with distinct, darker spots edged in blue, varying from dark red to black or brown. The body is club-shaped with a dorsal frill. When in water, creamy rhinophores (chemosensory tentacles) and a dorsal gill rosette are visible.

== Ecology ==
This species feeds on sponges. Its egg ribbon is a stiff collar of large yellow-orange eggs.
