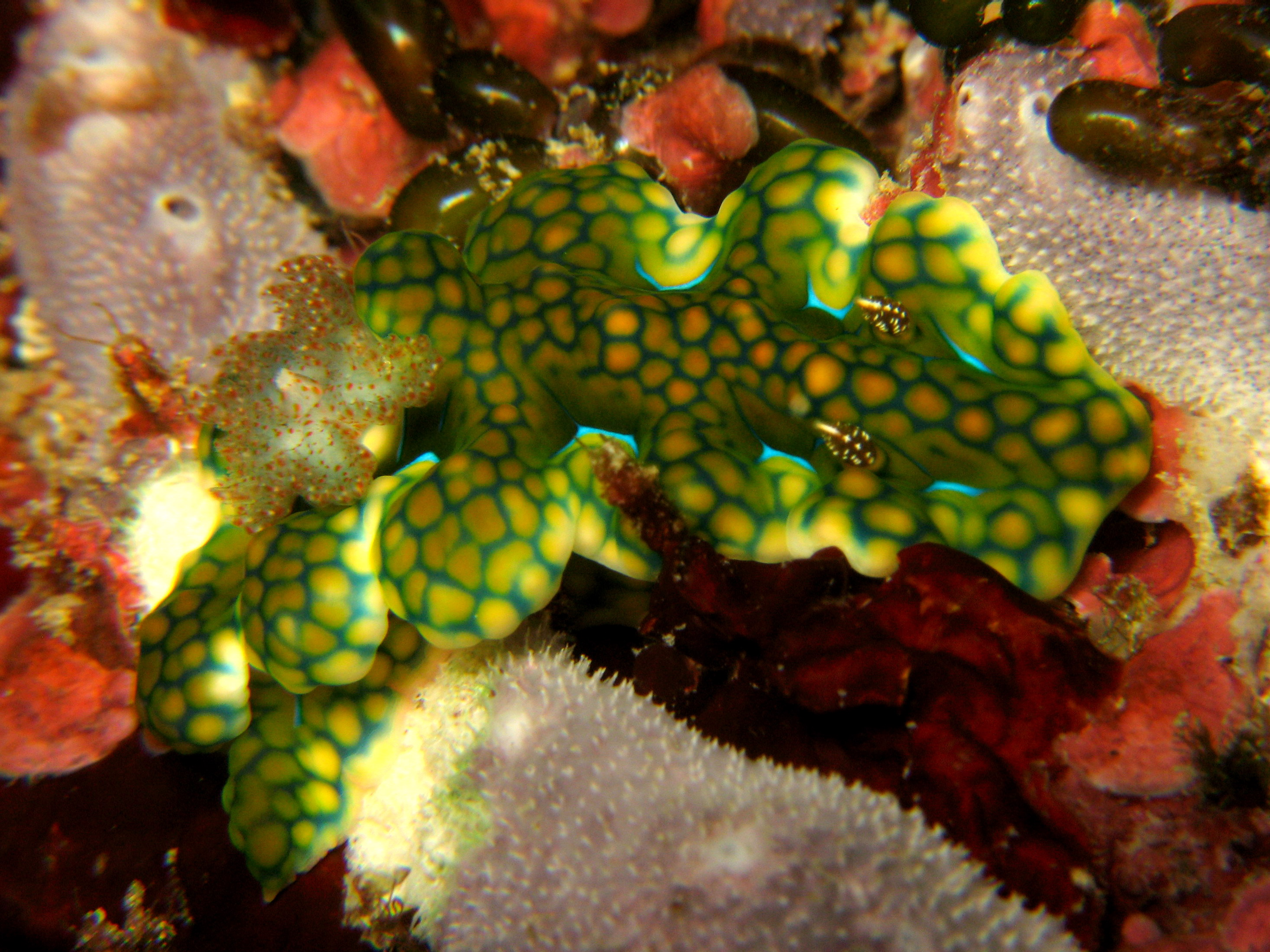
- A live individual of Miamira sinuata in situ, head end towards the right

Scientific classification
- Kingdom: Animalia
- Phylum: Mollusca
- Class: Gastropoda
- Order: Nudibranchia
- Family: Chromodorididae
- Genus: Miamira; Bergh, 1875

Type species
- Miamira nobilis Bergh, 1875

Synonyms
- Orodoris Bergh, 1875

= Miamira =

Genus of gastropods

Miamira is a genus of colourful sea slugs, specifically dorid nudibranchs, shell-less marine gastropod mollusks in the family Chromodorididae.

== Species ==
This genus includes the following species:

- Miamira alleni Gosliner, 1996
- Miamira flavicostata Baba, 1940
- Miamira magnifica Eliot, 1904
- Miamira miamirana Bergh, 1875
- Miamira moloch Rudman, 1988
- Miamira sinuata van Hasselt, 1824
- Miamira striata Eliot, 1905

Species brought into synonymy

- Miamira nobilis Bergh, 1875: synonym of Miamira sinuata van Hasselt, 1824
