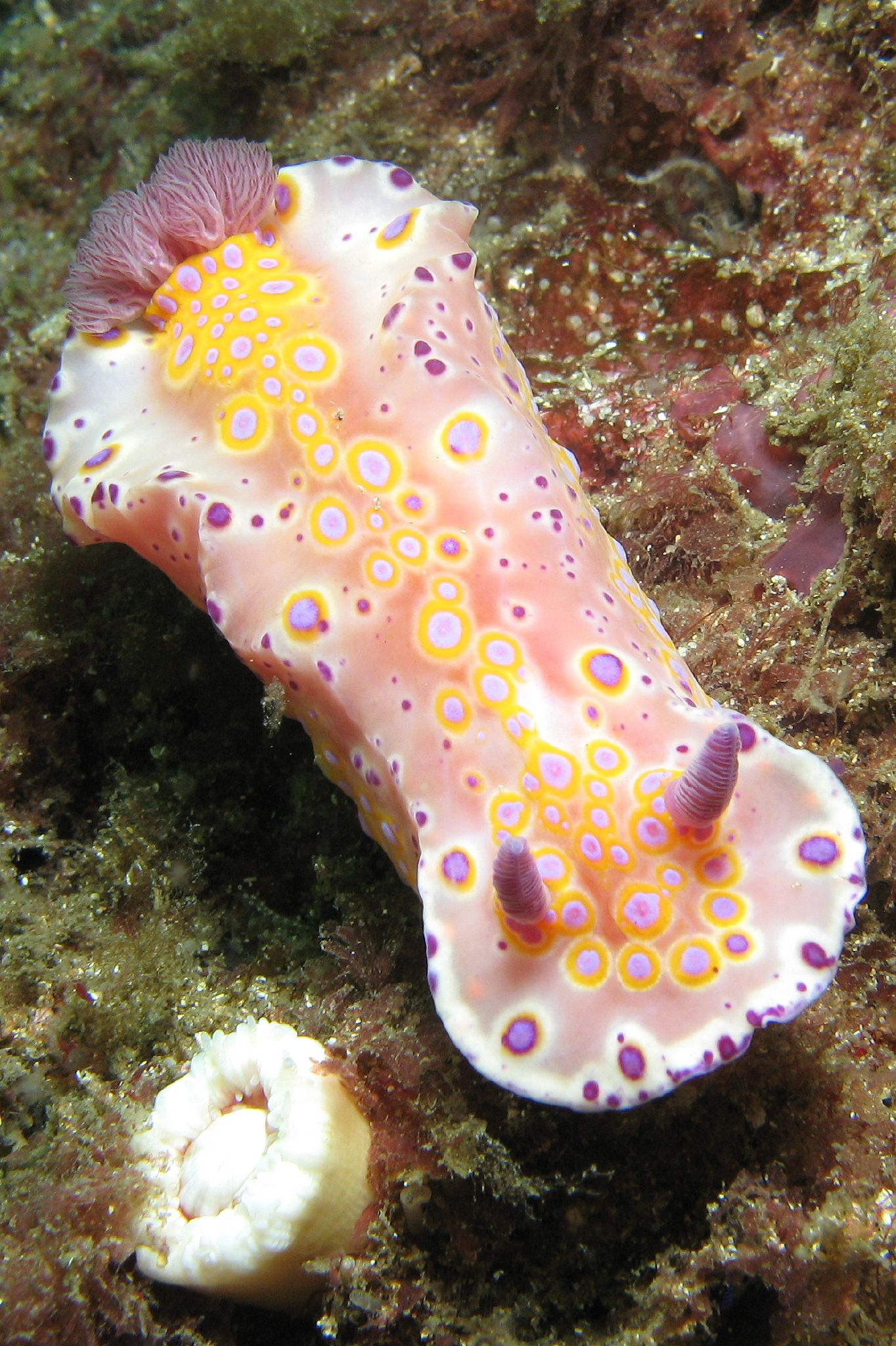

Scientific classification
- Kingdom: Animalia
- Phylum: Mollusca
- Class: Gastropoda
- Order: Nudibranchia
- Family: Chromodorididae
- Genus: Ceratosoma
- Species: C. brevicaudatum

Binomial name
- Ceratosoma brevicaudatum Abraham, 1876

= Ceratosoma brevicaudatum =

Short-tailed ceratosoma

Species of gastropod

Ceratosoma brevicaudatum, the short-tailed ceratosoma, is a species of colourful dorid nudibranch, a sea slug, a shell-less marine gastropod mollusk in the family Chromodorididae.

== Distribution ==
Houtman Abrolhos, Western Australia, across South Australia and Victoria to Cape Byron, New South Wales, and around Tasmania.

== Description ==
This firm-bodied species grows to a maximum recorded length of 15 centimetres. Within South Australian waters, dark coloured individuals are more common in the west and paler colours more so in the east. An orange form is considered typical in SA.

== Ecology ==
The species feeds on Euryspongia spp. sponges.

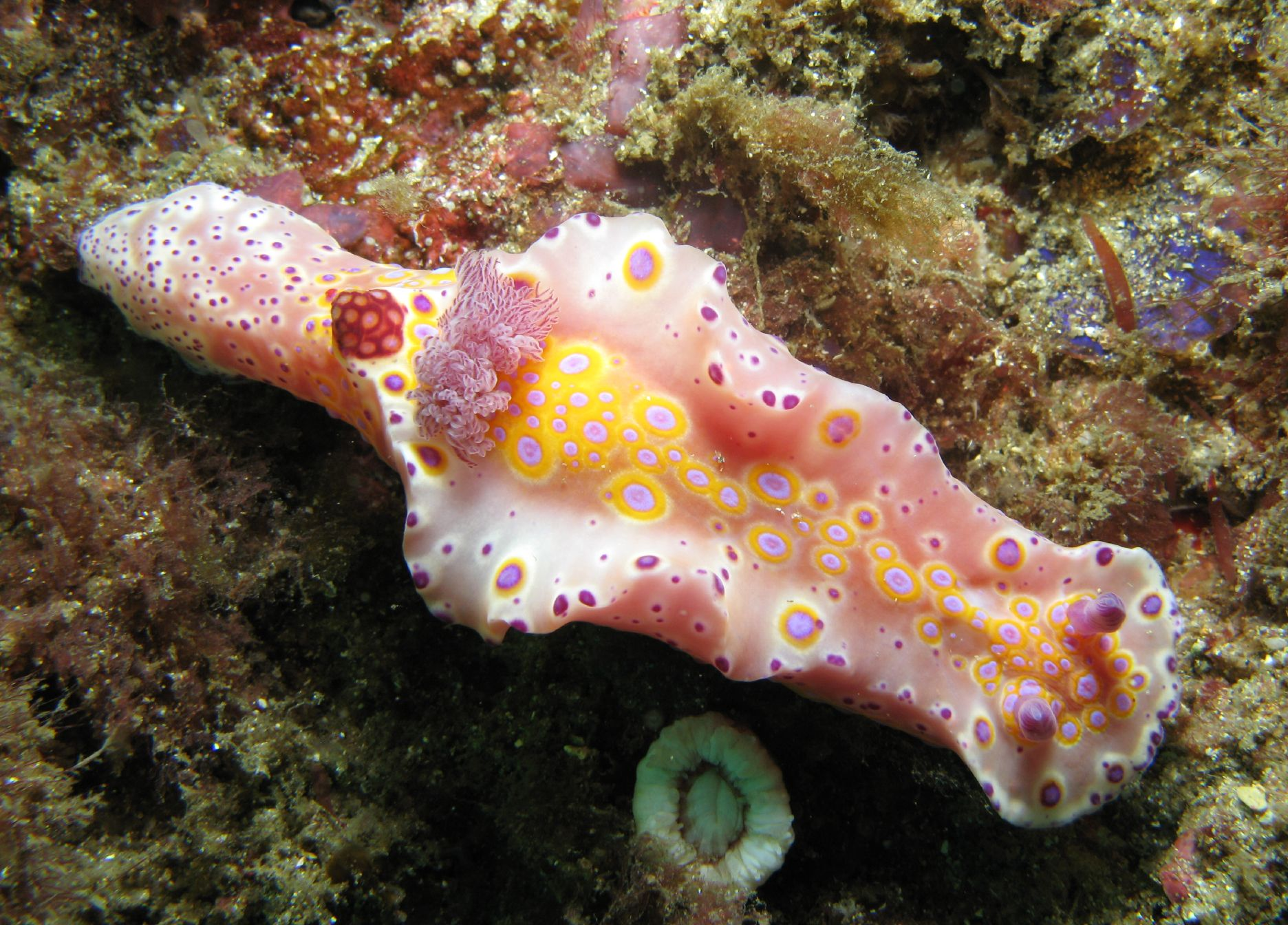
Ceratosoma brevicaudatum

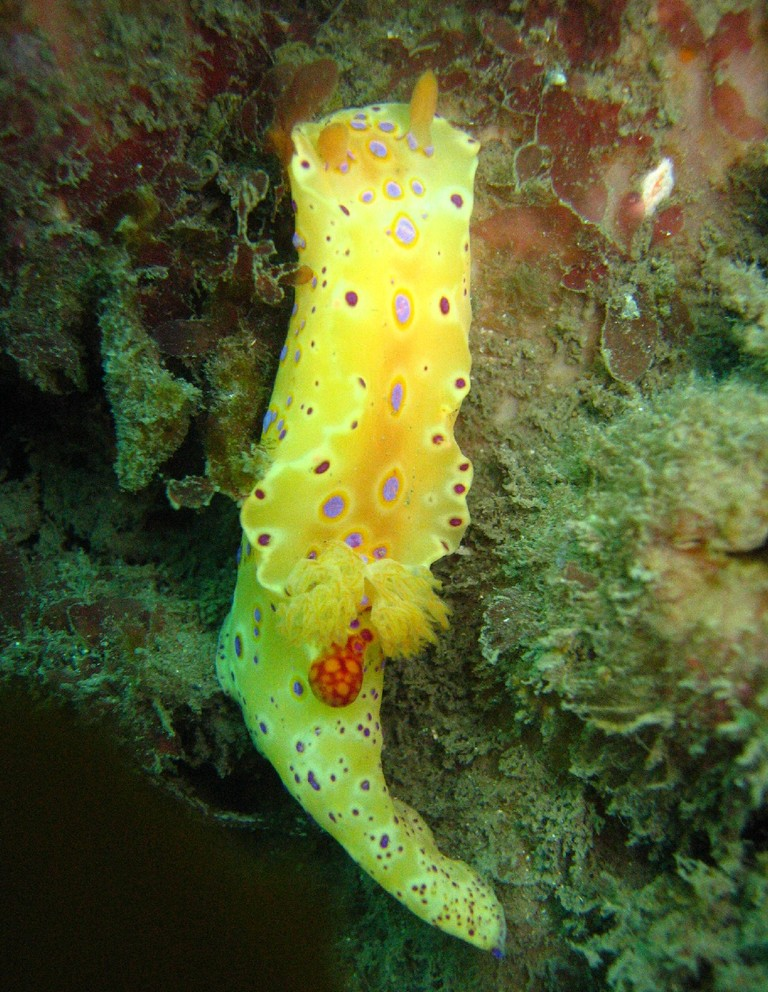
Yellow variation of Ceratosoma brevicaudatum at Fly Point, Port Stephens, New South Wales

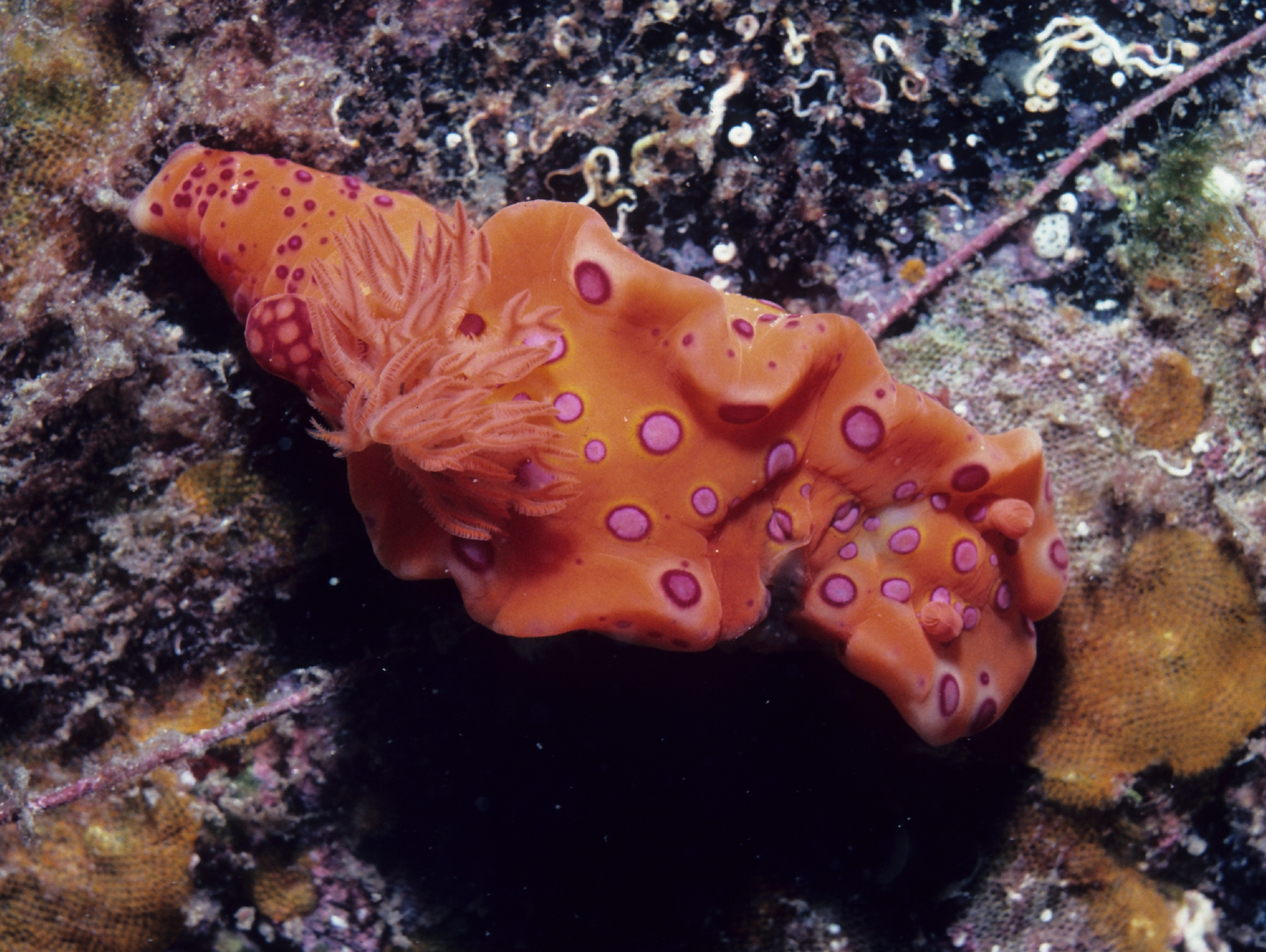
Ceratosoma brevicaudatum

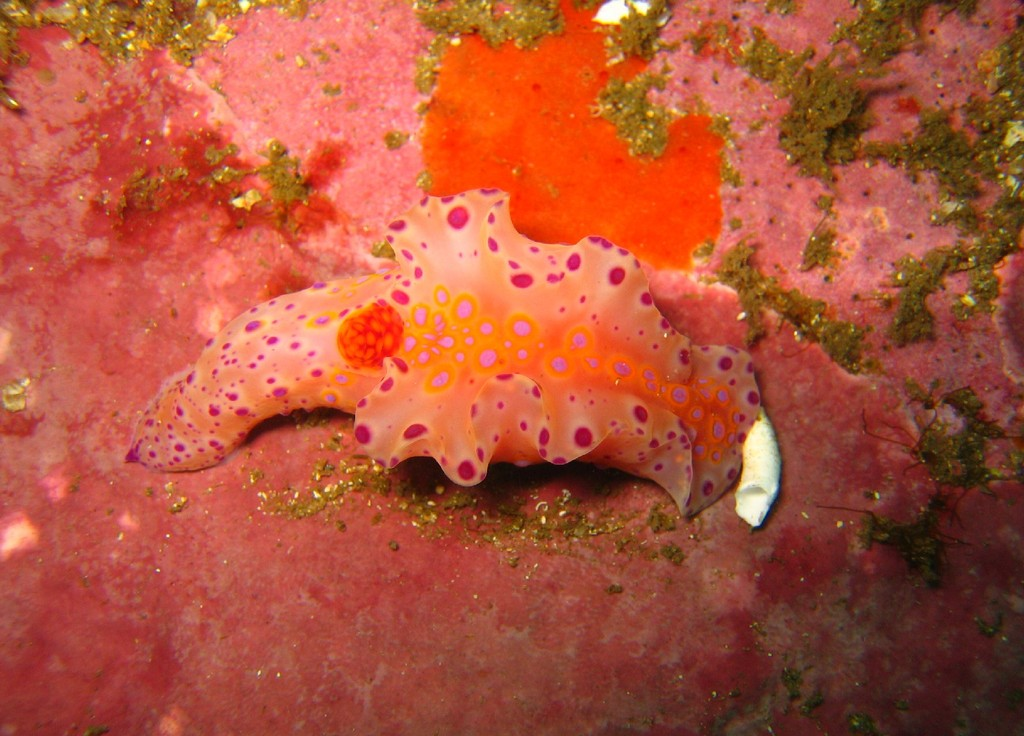
Ceratosoma brevicaudatum
