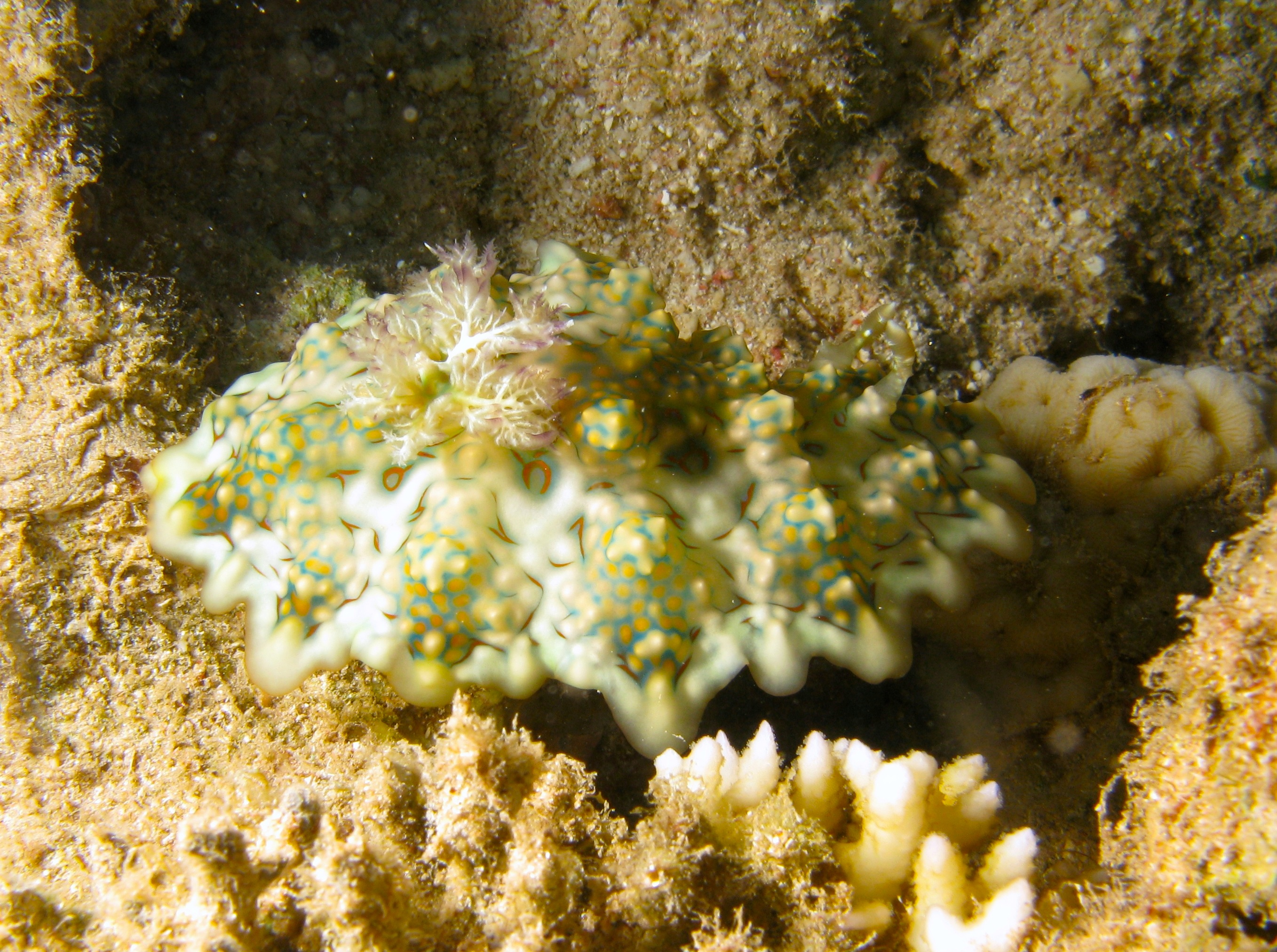

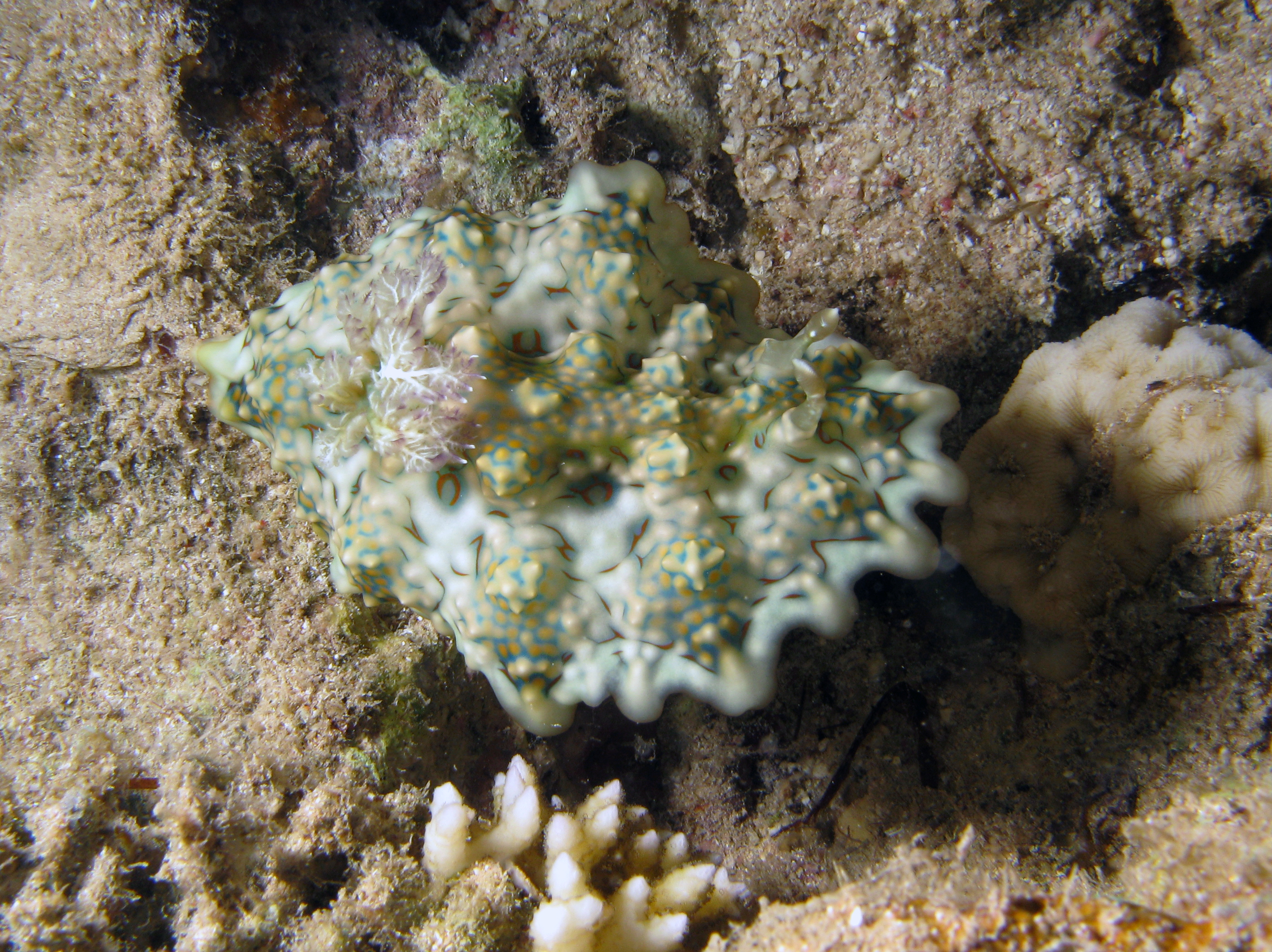

Scientific classification
- Kingdom: Animalia
- Phylum: Mollusca
- Class: Gastropoda
- Order: Nudibranchia
- Family: Chromodorididae
- Genus: Miamira
- Species: M. miamirana

Binomial name
- Miamira miamirana (Bergh, 1875)

Synonyms
- Ceratosoma miamiranum (Bergh, 1875); Orodoris miamirana Bergh, 1875 (basionym)

= Miamira miamirana =

Species of gastropod

Miamira miamirana is a species of colorful dorid nudibranch, a sea slug, a shell-less marine gastropod mollusk in the family Chromodorididae.
