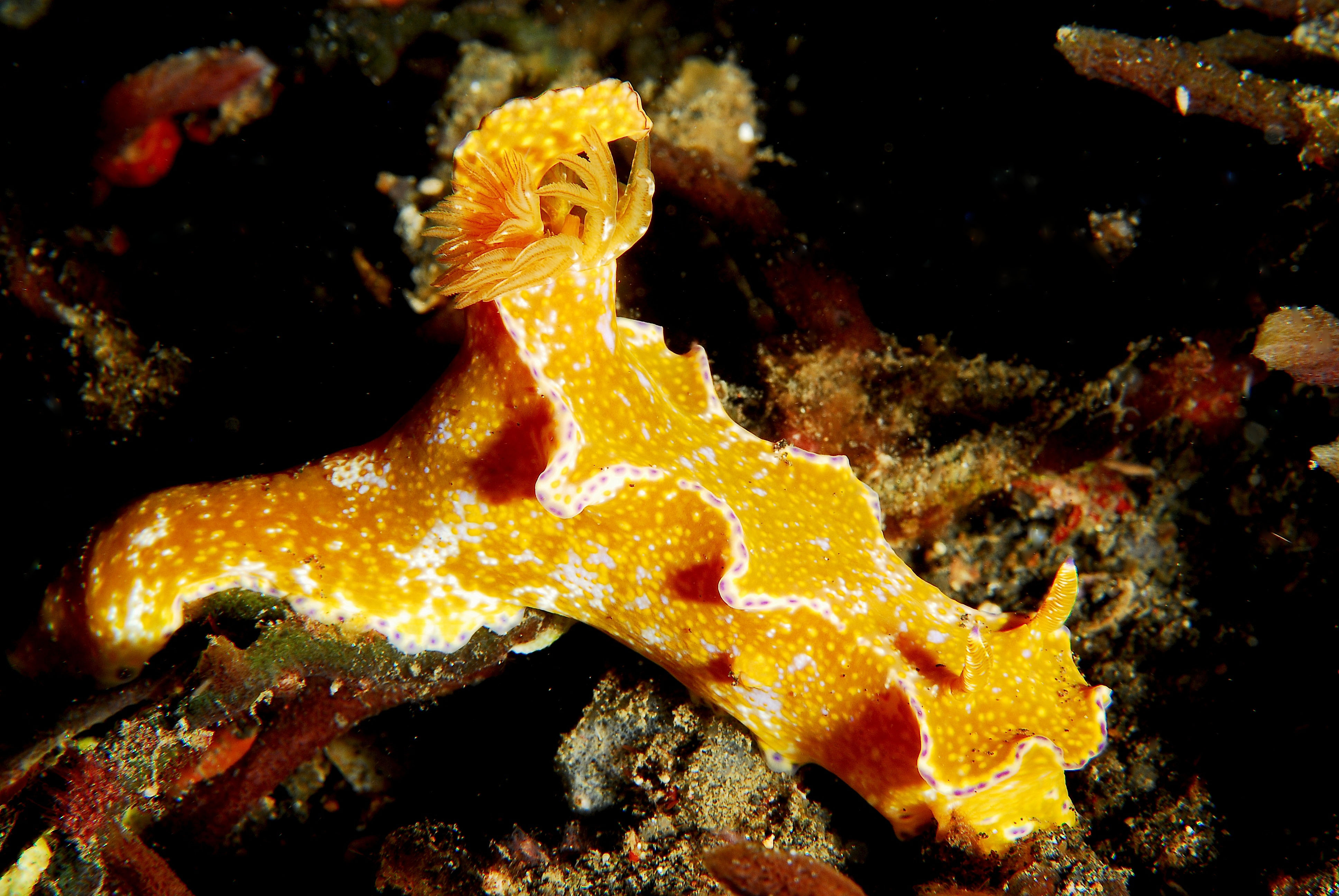
- Ceratosoma tenue

Scientific classification
- Domain: Eukaryota
- Kingdom: Animalia
- Phylum: Mollusca
- Class: Gastropoda
- Order: Nudibranchia
- Family: Chromodorididae
- Genus: Ceratosoma
- Species: C. tenue

Binomial name
- Ceratosoma tenue Abraham, 1876

Synonyms
- Ceratosoma bicorne Bergh, 1905; Ceratosoma francoisi Rochebrune, 1894; Ceratosoma jousseaumi Rochebrune, 1894; Ceratosoma ornatum Bergh, 1890; Ceratosoma rhopalicum Rochebrune, 1894

= Ceratosoma tenue =

Species of myriapod

Ceratosoma tenue is a species of colourful dorid nudibranch, a sea slug, a shell-less marine gastropod mollusc in the family Chromodorididae. (Note: "Ceratosoma tenue Abraham, 1876". MolluscaBase. 2018. Archived from the original on 2023-06-04.)

== Distribution ==
This sea slug is widespread throughout the tropical waters of the Indo-Pacific area, from the oriental African coast to Hawaii.

== Description ==
Ceratosoma tenue can grow to a maximal size of 12 centimetres (4.7 in) length. The body colouration is extremely variable but is always composed of bright colours. However, the body colouration is not a valuable criterion of determination for this species because it can easily be confused with Ceratosoma tribolatum. The physical distinctive criteria are three mantle lobes on the first half of the body on each side and the purple margin of the mantle and foot is a dotted line. Another specificity of many species of Ceratosoma is the kind of "horn" covering the gills, which is like a lure and acts as a defensive chemical weapon that will scare any potential predator who dares to bite this part. The gills and the rhinophores are retractile in internal sheaths.

== Behavior ==
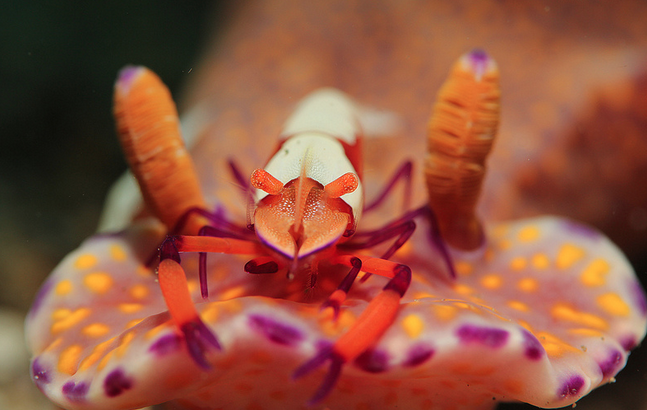
Ceratosoma tenue serving as commensal host to an Emperor Shrimp (Periclimenes imperator)

Ceratosoma tenue is active all time and has a diurnal activity.

== Feeding ==
Ceratosoma tenue feeds on sponges of the genus Dysidea.
