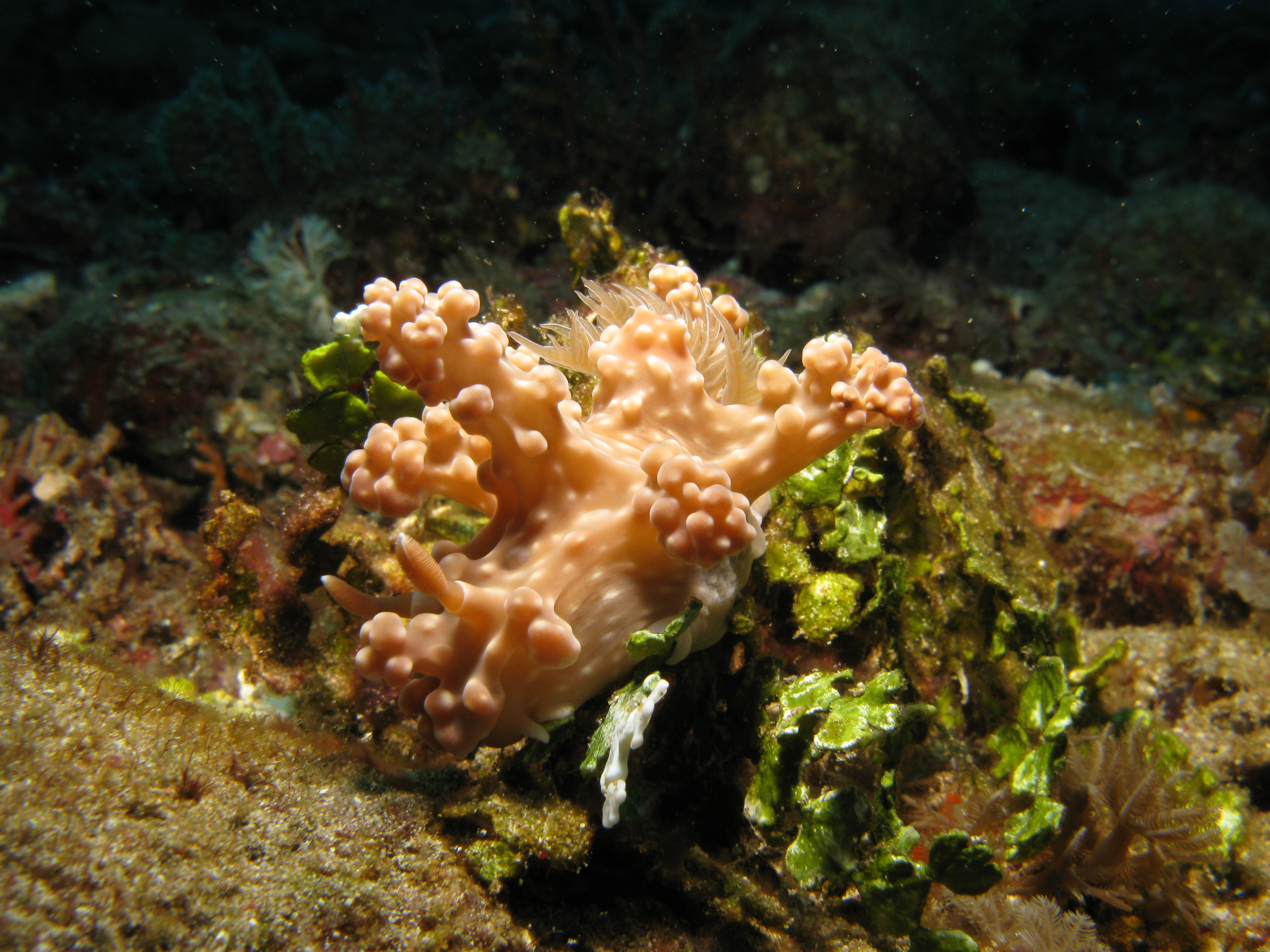
- Miamira alleni at East Nusa Tenggara, Indonesia, head end towards the front

Scientific classification
- Kingdom: Animalia
- Phylum: Mollusca
- Class: Gastropoda
- Order: Nudibranchia
- Family: Chromodorididae
- Genus: Miamira
- Species: M. alleni

Binomial name
- Miamira alleni (Gosliner, 1996)

Synonyms
- Ceratosoma alleni Gosliner, 1996 (basionym)

= Miamira alleni =

Species of gastropod

Miamira alleni is a species of colorful sea slug, a dorid nudibranch, a shell-less marine gastropod mollusk in the family Chromodorididae.

== Distribution ==
This species is found in shallow reefs in Southeast Asia.

== Ecology ==
M. alleni has not been observed eating, but it is likely that it consumes sponges, like other Miamira species.
