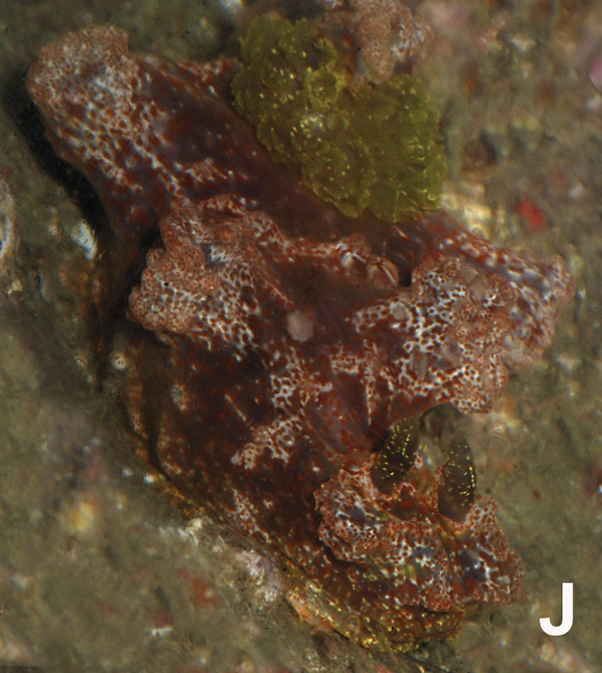

Scientific classification
- Kingdom: Animalia
- Phylum: Mollusca
- Class: Gastropoda
- Order: Nudibranchia
- Family: Chromodorididae
- Genus: Miamira
- Species: M. moloch

Binomial name
- Miamira moloch (Rudman, 1988)

Synonyms
- Ceratosoma moloch Rudman, 1988 (basionym)

= Miamira moloch =

Species of gastropod

Miamira moloch is a species of sea slug or dorid nudibranch, a marine gastropod mollusk in the family Chromodorididae.
