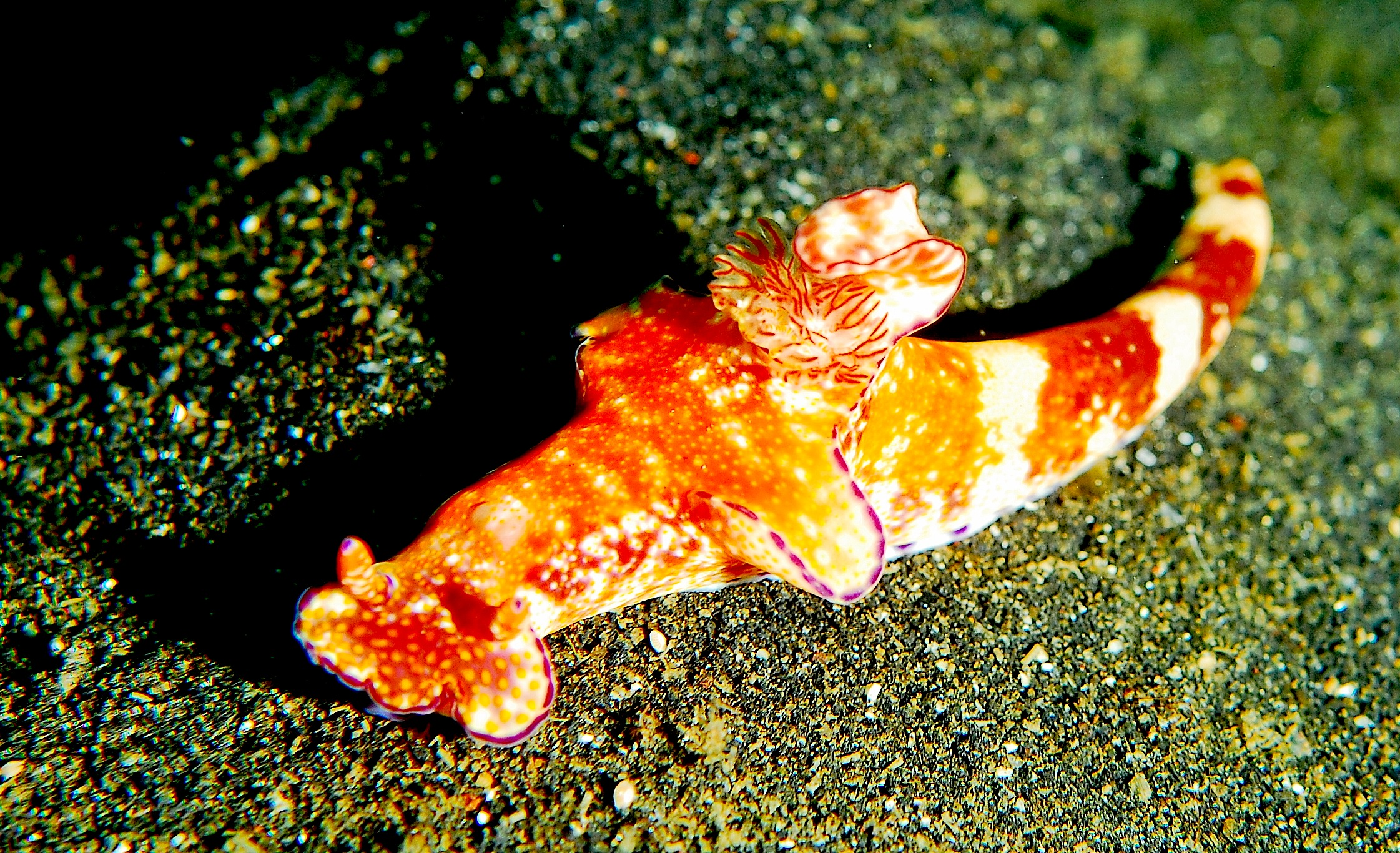

Scientific classification
- Kingdom: Animalia
- Phylum: Mollusca
- Class: Gastropoda
- Order: Nudibranchia
- Family: Chromodorididae
- Genus: Ceratosoma
- Species: C. trilobatum

Binomial name
- Ceratosoma trilobatum J.E. Gray, 1827

Synonyms
- Ceratosoma berghi Rochebrune, 1895; Ceratosoma caledonicum Fischer, 1876; Ceratosoma corallinum Odhner, 1917; Ceratosoma cornigerum Adams & Reeve, 1850; Ceratosoma gibbosum Rochebrune, 1894; Ceratosoma lixi Rochebrune, 1894; Doris trifida J.E. Gray, 1850; Doris trilobata J.E. Gray, 1827 (original combination); Polycera cornigera Adams & Reeve in Adams, 1848

= Ceratosoma trilobatum =

Species of gastropod

Ceratosoma trilobatum is a species of colorful dorid nudibranch, a sea slug, a shell-less marine gastropod mollusk in the family Chromodorididae.

== Distribution ==
This sea slug was described from India. It is widespread throughout the tropical waters of the Indo-Pacific area, from the oriental African coast to Japan, Red Sea included.

== Description ==
Ceratosoma trilobatum can grow to a maximal size of 15 cm length. The body colouration is extremely variable but is always composed of bright colors. However, the body colouration is not a valuable criterion of determination for this species because it can easily be confused with Ceratosoma tenue.

The physical distinctive criteria are two mantle lobes on the first half of the body on each side. The first one is around the head part and the second one is close to the gills. The purple margin of the mantle and foot is an unbroken line.

Another specificity of the species is the kind of "horn" covering the gills, which is like a lure and acts as a defensive chemical weapon that will scare any potential predator who dares to bite this part. The gills and the rhinophores are retractile in internal sheaths and their basis has a purple margin.

== Behavior ==
Ceratosoma trilobatum is diurnal.

== Feeding ==
Ceratosoma trilobatum feeds on sponge of genus Dysidea.
