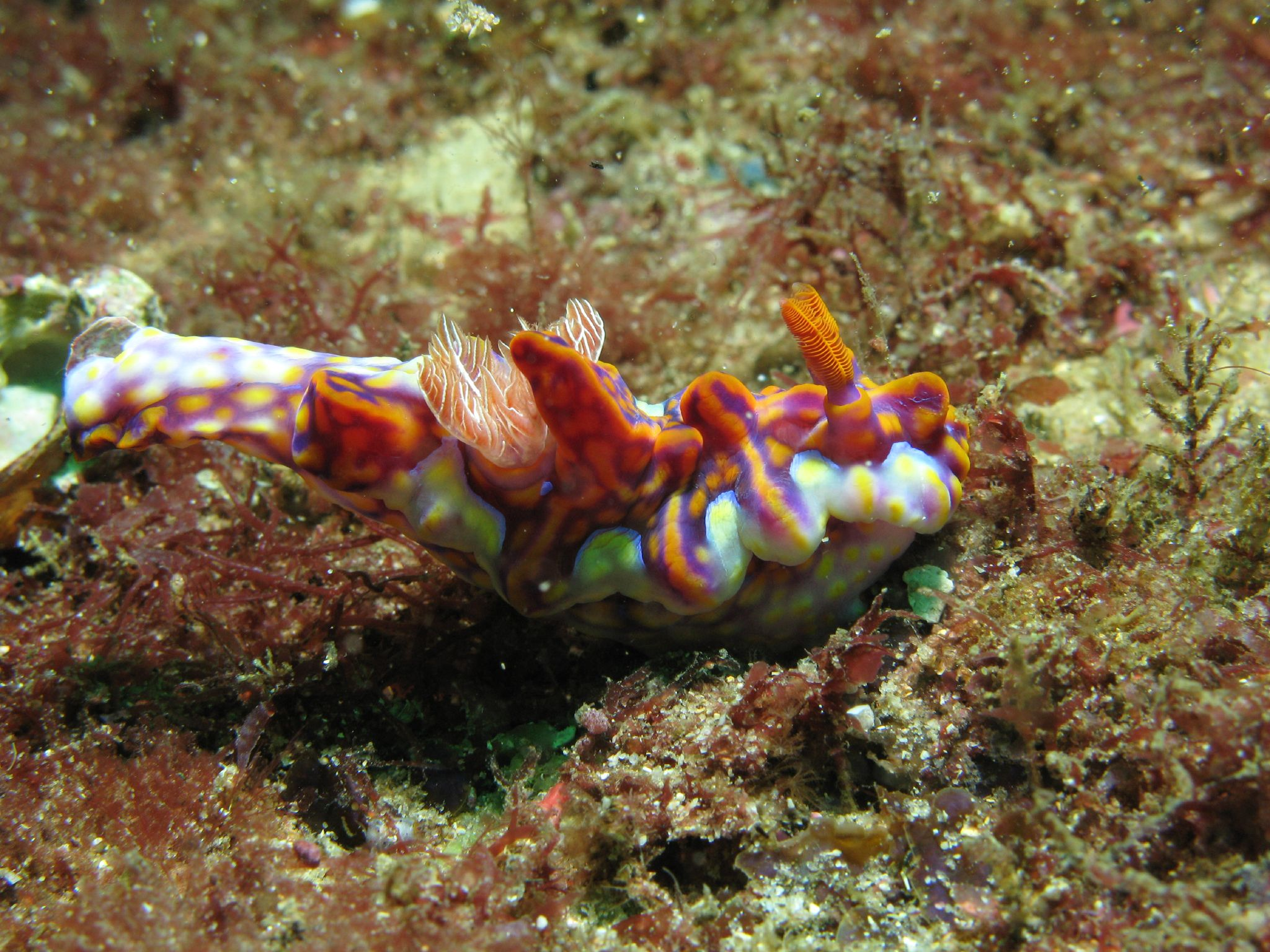

Scientific classification
- Kingdom: Animalia
- Phylum: Mollusca
- Class: Gastropoda
- Order: Nudibranchia
- Family: Chromodorididae
- Genus: Miamira
- Species: M. flavicostata

Binomial name
- Miamira flavicostata Baba, 1940

Synonyms
- Ceratosoma flavicostatum (Baba, 1940)

= Miamira flavicostata =

Species of gastropod

Miamira flavicostata is a species of sea slug or dorid nudibranch, a marine gastropod mollusk in the family Chromodorididae.

== Distribution ==
This species was described from Japan. It is reported from Indonesia and eastern Australia.

== Description ==
The colouration of this nudibranch is flamboyant, principally with a purple background, orange ridges on the back and yellow spots on the foot.
