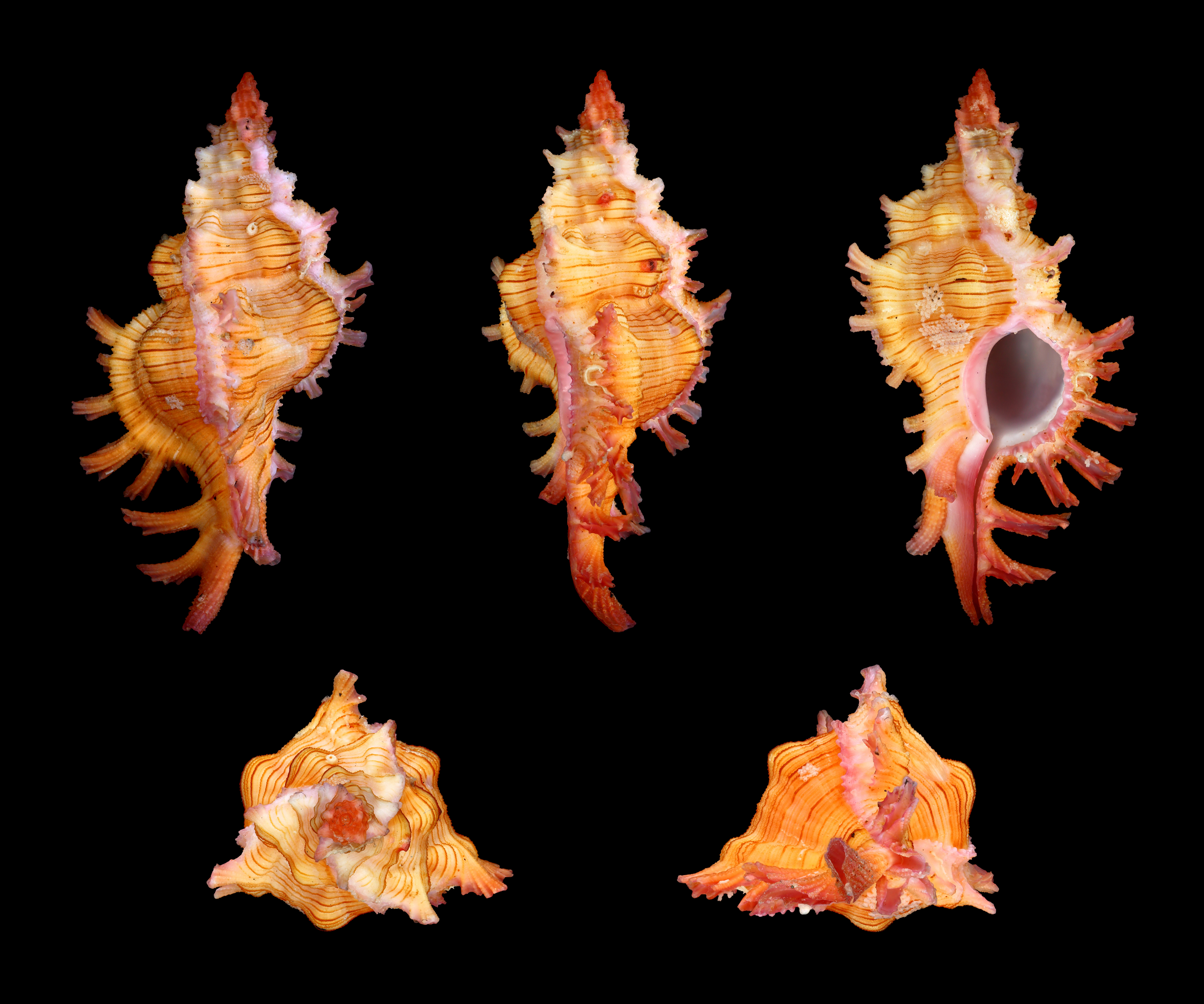
- Five views of a shell of Chicoreus aculeatus

Scientific classification
- Kingdom: Animalia
- Phylum: Mollusca
- Class: Gastropoda
- Subclass: Caenogastropoda
- Order: Neogastropoda
- Family: Muricidae
- Genus: Chicoreus
- Species: C. aculeatus

Binomial name
- Chicoreus aculeatus (Lamarck, 1822)

Synonyms
- Chicoreus (Triplex) aculeatus (Lamarck, 1822); Chicoreus artemis Radwin & D'Attilio, 1976; Murex aculeatus Lamarck, 1822 (basionym)

= Chicoreus aculeatus =

Species of gastropod

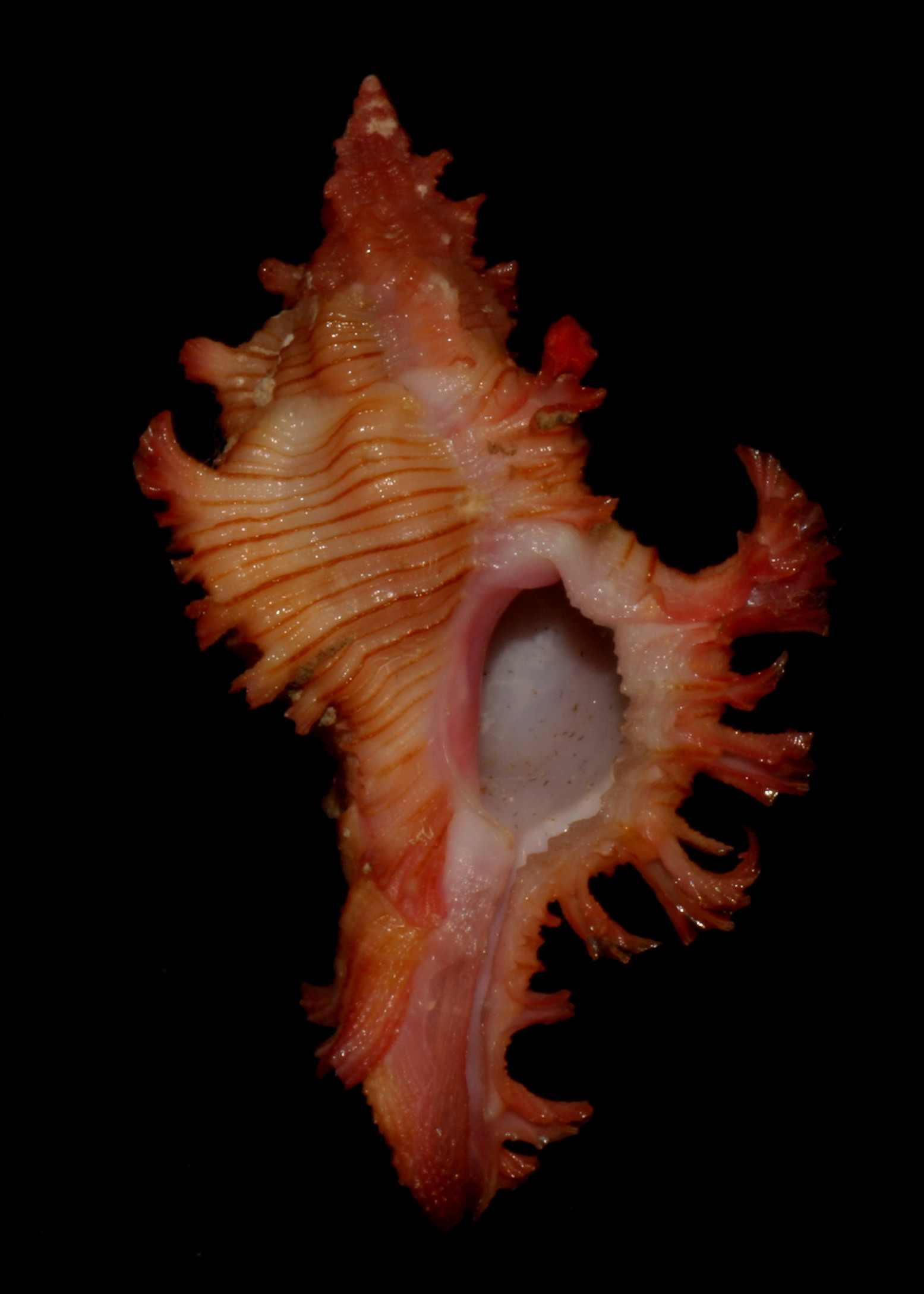
Shell of Chicoreus aculeatus (Lamarck, 1822, 35.6 mm in length, tangle nets off Punta Engano, Philippines.

Chicoreus aculeatus, common name the pendant murex, is a species of predatory sea snail, a marine gastropod mollusk in the family Muricidae, the murex snails or rock snails.

== Description ==
The size of an adult shell varies between 38 mm and 65 mm.

== Distribution ==
This species occurs along the coast of South Africa and in the Pacific Ocean along the coasts of Japan, the Philippines and the Moluccas.
