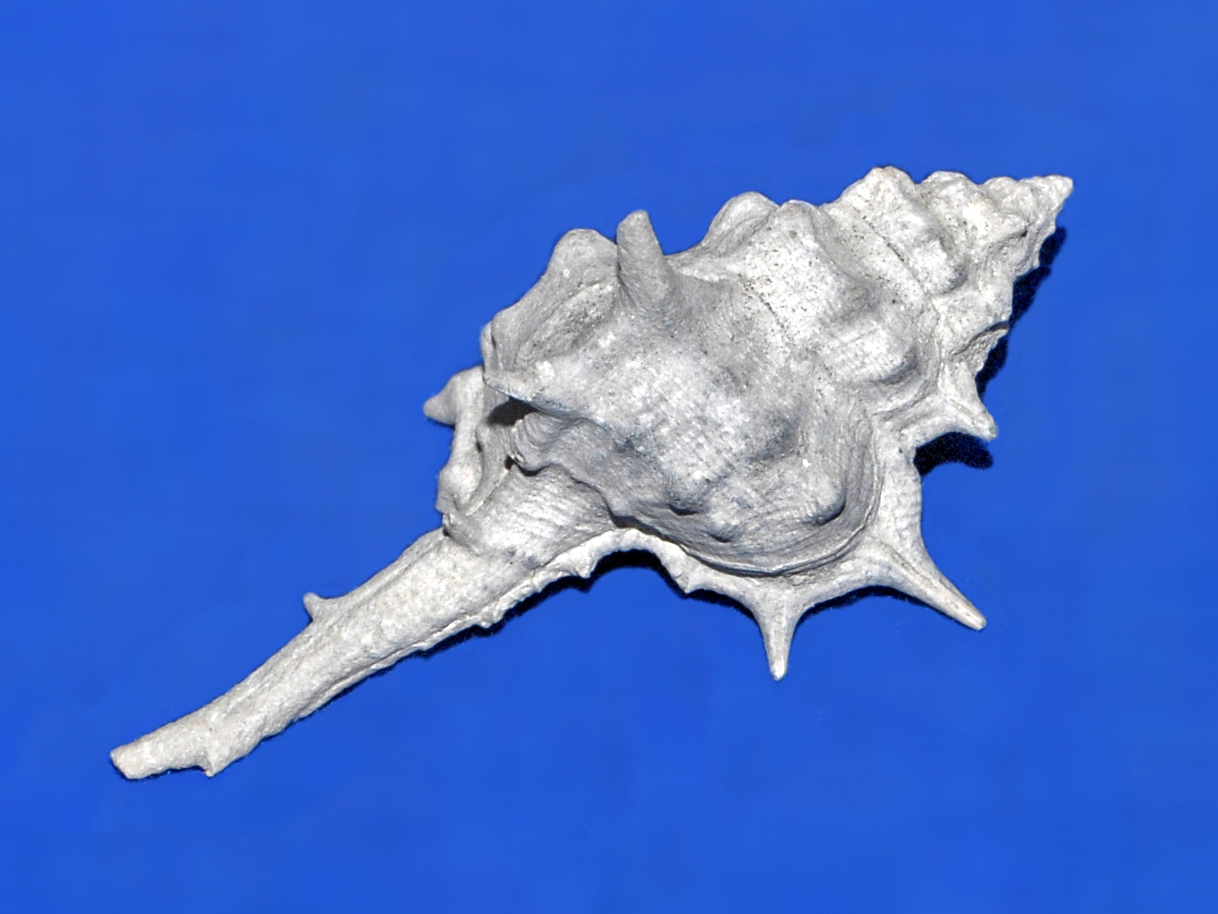
- Fossil shell of Murex spinicosta from Pliocene of Italy

Scientific classification
- Kingdom: Animalia
- Phylum: Mollusca
- Class: Gastropoda
- (unranked): clade Caenogastropoda clade Hypsogastropoda clade Neogastropoda
- Superfamily: Muricoidea
- Family: Muricidae
- Genus: Murex
- Subgenus: Promurex Ponder and Vokes, 1988

= Promurex =

Promurex Temporal range: Miocene - Recent

Subgenus of gastropods

Promurex is a subgenus of predatory sea snail, a marine gastropod mollusc in the family Muricidae, the rock snails or murex snails.

== Extant and extinct species ==
Species within this subgenus include:

- Murex antelmei Viader, 1938
- Murex protocrassus Houart, 1990
- Murex spinicosta Bronn 1831 † (extinct)

Murex spinicosta lived in the Pliocene of Spain and Italy and in the Miocene of Denmark and Germany, from 11.608 to 2.588 Ma.
