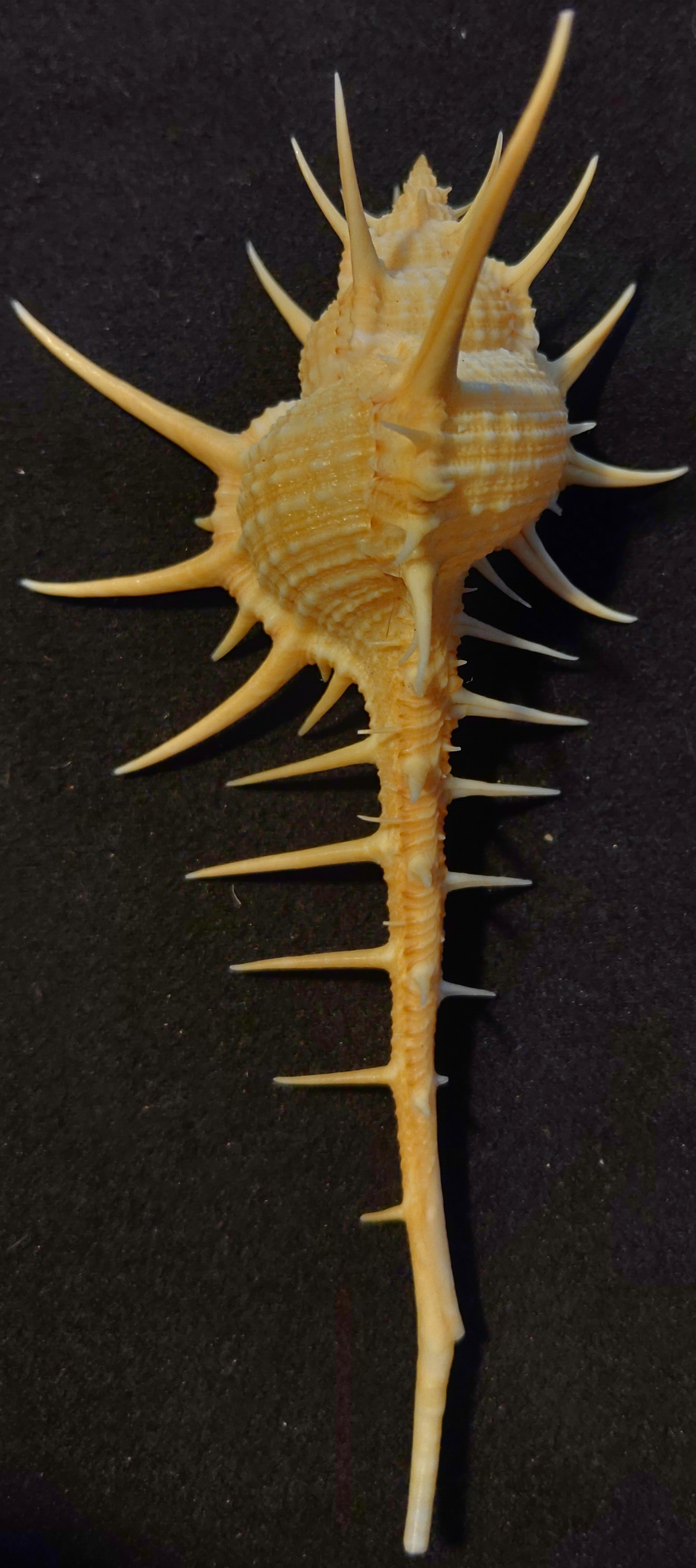

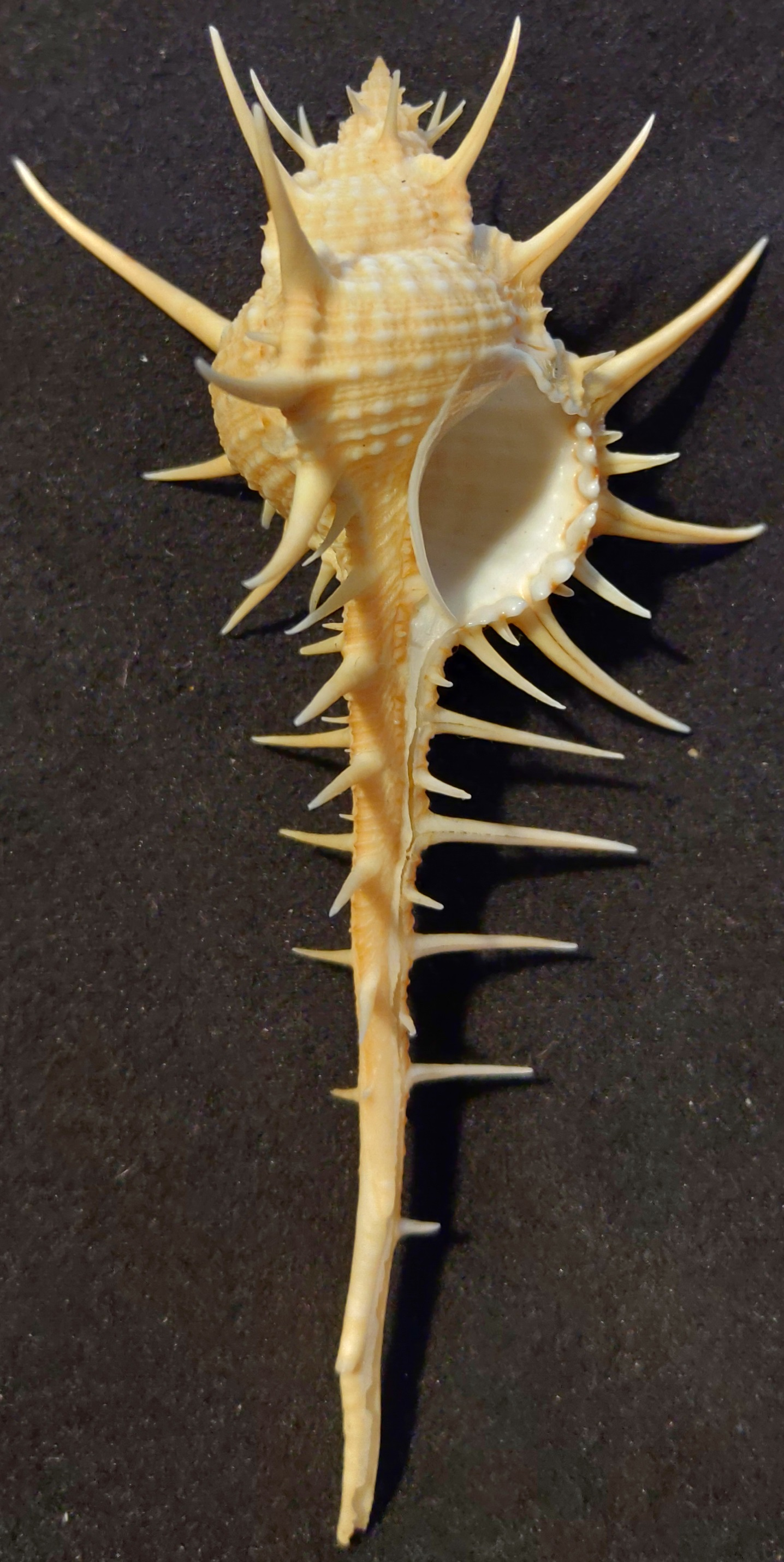

Scientific classification
- Kingdom: Animalia
- Phylum: Mollusca
- Class: Gastropoda
- Subclass: Caenogastropoda
- Order: Neogastropoda
- Family: Muricidae
- Genus: Murex
- Species: M. tenuirostrum

Binomial name
- Murex tenuirostrum Lamarck, 1822

SynonymsLamarck, 1822
- Murex (Murex) tenuirostrum Lamarck, 1822· accepted, alternate representation

= Murex tenuirostrum =

Species of gastropod

Murex tenuirostrum is a species of sea snail, a marine gastropod mollusk in the family Muricidae, the murex snails or rock snails.

Subspecies

- Murex tenuirostrum africanus Ponder & E. H. Vokes, 1988: synonym of Murex africanus Ponder & E. H. Vokes, 1988

== Distribution ==
This marine species occurs off Papua New Guinea.
