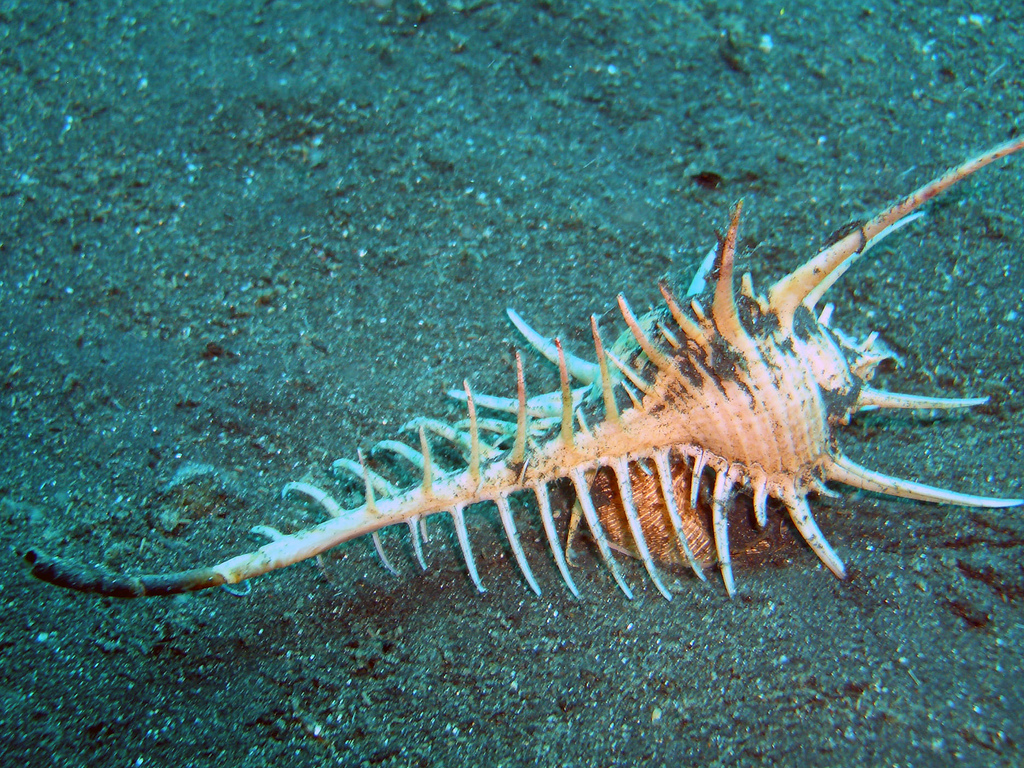
- A live Venus comb murex, Murex pecten

Scientific classification
- Kingdom: Animalia
- Phylum: Mollusca
- Class: Gastropoda
- Subclass: Caenogastropoda
- Order: Neogastropoda
- Family: Muricidae
- Subfamily: Muricinae
- Genus: Murex; Linnaeus, 1758

Type species
- Murex tribulus Linnaeus, 1758

Synonyms
- Acupurpura Jousseaume, 1880; Aranea Perry, 1810 (Invalid: junior homonym of Aranea Linnaeus, 1758 [Arachnida]); Murex (Murex) Linnaeus, 1758· accepted, alternate representation; Murex (Promurex) Ponder & Vokes, 1988· accepted, alternate representation; Murex (Tubicauda) Jousseaume, 1880 junior subjective synonym; † Muricites Schlotheim, 1820 (Invalid under Art. 20: name established for fossils, formed by adding the suffix -ites to the genus name Murex.); Tubicauda Jousseaume, 1880

= Murex =

Murex Temporal range: Cretaceous - Recent

Genus of gastropods

Murex is a genus of medium to large sized predatory tropical sea snails. They are carnivorous marine gastropod molluscs in the family Muricidae, commonly called "murexes" or "rock snails".

The common name murex is still used for many species in the family Muricidae which were originally given the Latin generic name Murex, but have more recently been regrouped into separate genera. Murex was used in antiquity to describe spiny sea snails, especially those associated with the production of purple dye. Murex is one of the oldest classical seashell names still used by the scientific community.

== Etymology ==
The name originates from the Latin word mūrex, likely related to the Greek word μύαξ (myax), meaning sea mussel. The connection between these terms suggests a shared linguistic root, possibly linked to the Greek word μῦς (mys), meaning "mouse", due to the perceived resemblance between the shape of certain mollusks and mice.

Aristotle described these mollusks in his History of Animals using the Greek term πορφύρα (porphyra).

== Fossil records ==
This genus is known in the fossil records from the Cretaceous to the Quaternary (age range: from 125.45 to 0.0 million years ago). Fossils of species within this genus have been found all over the world. There are about 25 known extinct species.

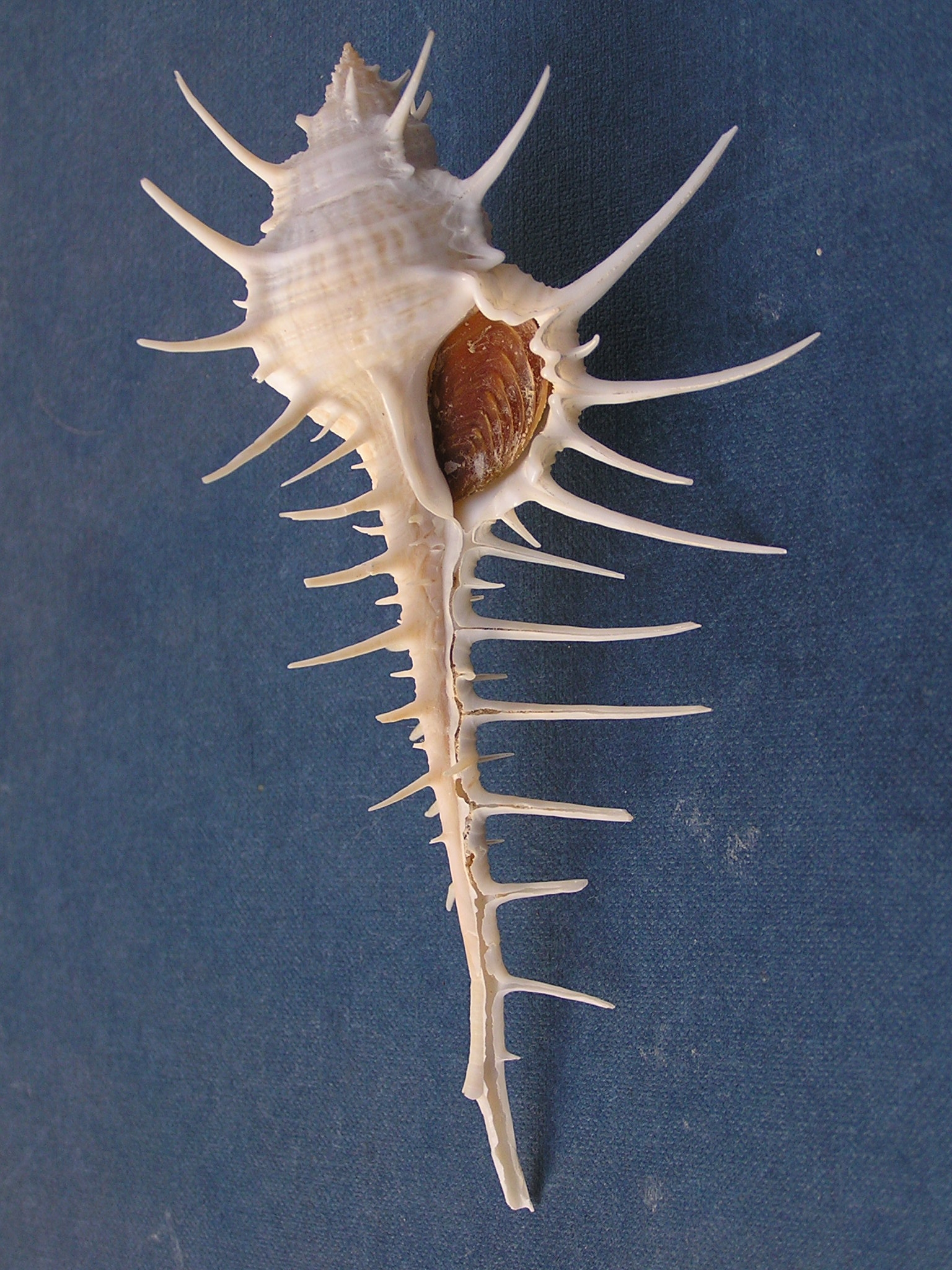
Murex altispira

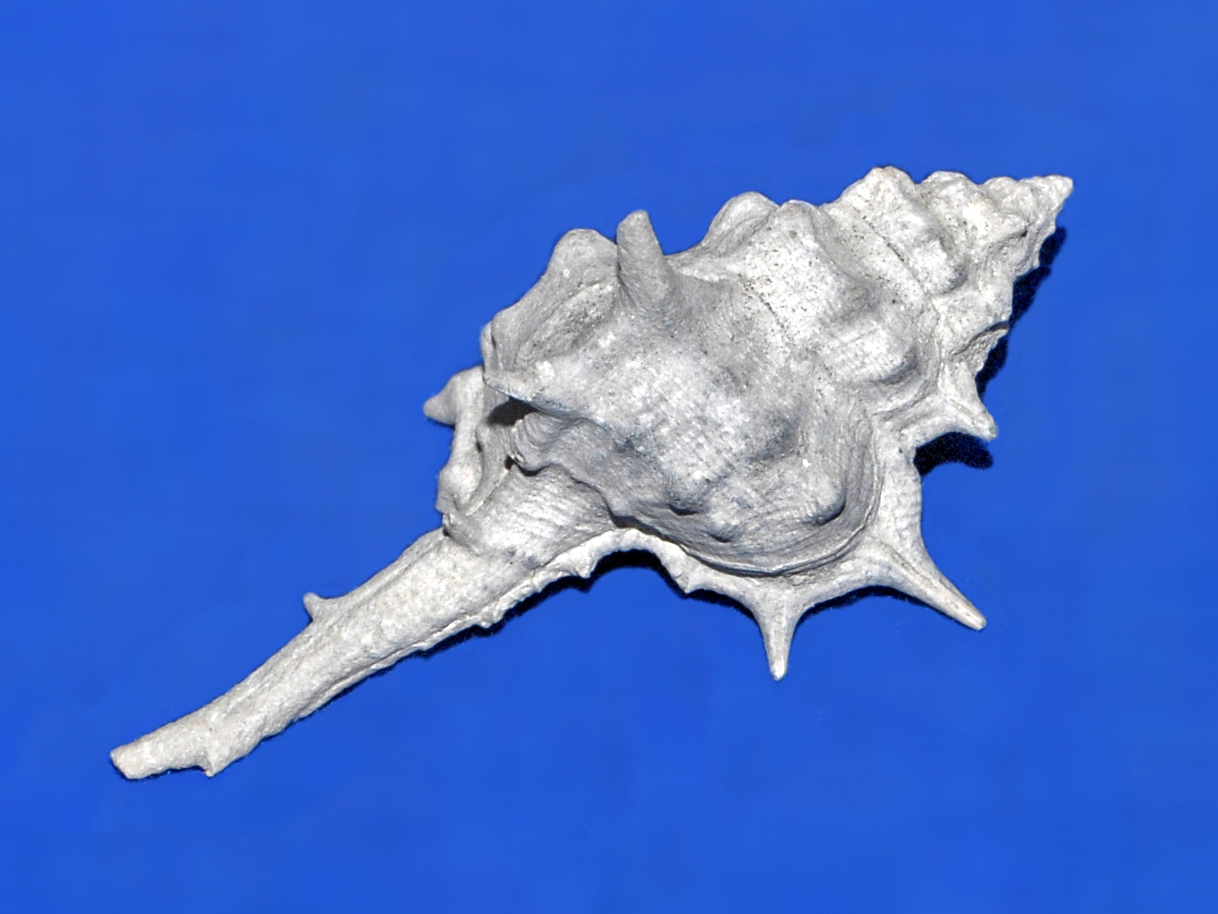
Fossil shell of Murex spinicosta from Pliocene of Italy

== Distribution ==
Murex is solely an Indo-Pacific genus, as demonstrated by Ponder & Vokes (1988). The species from the western Atlantic that were formerly considered to belong to the genus Murex are now placed in the genus Haustellum.

== Habitat ==
Most Murex species live in the intertidal or shallow subtidal zone, among rocks and corals.

== Shell description ==
This genus includes many showy members, their elongate shells highly sculptured with spines or fronds. The inner surfaces of their ornate shells are often brightly coloured.

== Human use ==
The costly and labour-intensive dyes Tyrian purple (or "royal purple") and tekhelet were historically made by the ancient Phoenicians, using mucus from the hypobranchial gland of two species commonly referred to as "murex", Murex brandaris and Murex trunculus, which are now classified as Bolinus brandaris and Hexaplex trunculus. This dye is a rare animal-produced organobromine compound, which the snails make using a specific bromide peroxidase enzyme that operates on dissolved bromide in sea water.

This dye was used in royal robes, other kinds of special ceremonial or ritual garments, or garments indicating high rank. It is hypothesised that the dye was the same dye as that which featured prominently in the ancient Temple in Jerusalem, the clothing of the High Priest of Israel officiating there; it is sometimes still used by Jews today in the ritual fringes (tzitzit) on four-cornered garments. A consensus has yet to be reached regarding the Biblical source of the "blue" dye, though the latest archeological research on dyes in this region indicates that it was indeed Murex trunculus snails that were used for the ancient tekhelet dye.

== Species ==
The genus Murex, as originally defined by Linnaeus, encompassed many taxa that are now placed elsewhere in the superfamily Muricoidea. During the 19th century, the definition of Murex was restricted by Lamarck and his contemporaries first to species in the family Muricidae, and then was limited even further to the subfamilies Muricinae and Ocenebrinae. Malacologists of the 19th century including Kiener, Reeve, Küster & Kobelt and Sowerby treated all muricoid forms as belonging to Murex. This is the main reason why Murex has so many synonyms.

The World Register of Marine Species (WoRMS) lists the following species with accepted names within the genus Murex. The subgenera are considered alternate representations.

- Murex acanthostephes Watson, 1883
- Murex aduncospinosus G.B. Sowerby II, 1841:
- Murex africanus Ponder & Vokes, 1988
- Murex altispira Ponder & Vokes, 1988 Caltrop murex
- Murex antelmei Viader, 1938
- † Murex bonneti Cossmann, 1903
- Murex brevispina Lamarck, 1822 Short-spined murex
- † Murex camplytropis Tate, 1888
- Murex carbonnieri (Jousseaume, 1881) Carbonnier's murex
- Murex concinnus Reeve, 1845
- Murex coppingeri E. A. Smith, 1884
- † Murex crassiliratus Tate, 1888
- Murex djarianensis Martin, 1895
  - Murex djarianensis poppei (synonym : Murex (Murex) poppei Houart, 1979)
- Murex echinodes Houart, 2011
- Murex falsitribulus Ponder & Vokes, 1988
- Murex forskoehlii Röding, 1798
- † Murex grooti H. M. Jenkins, 1864
- † Murex guppyi Ladd, 1977
- † Murex halli d'Archiac & Haime, 1854
- Murex huangi Houart, 2010
- Murex hystricosus Houart & Dharma, 2001
- Murex indicus Houart, 2011
- † Murex irregularis Tate, 1888
- Murex kerslakae Ponder & Vokes, 1988
- † Murex lyelli d'Archiac & Haime, 1854 (accepted > unreplaced junior homonym)
- Murex megapex Neubert, 1998
- † Murex minutus R. M. Johnston, 1880
- † Murex nasongoensis Ladd, 1977
- † Murex noae Holten, 1802
- Murex occa G.B. Sowerby II, 1834 Harrowed murex
- † Murex paradoxicus H. M. Jenkins, 1864
- Murex pecten Lightfoot, 1786 ': Venus comb murex
  - Murex pecten soelae
- Murex philippinensis Parth, 1994
- Murex protocrassus Houart, 1990
- Murex queenslandicus Ponder & Vokes, 1988
- † Murex roemeri d'Archiac & Haime, 1854
- Murex salomonensis Parth, 1994
- Murex scolopax Dillwyn, 1817 False venus comb, woodcock murex
- Murex somalicus Parth, 1990
- Murex spectabilis Ponder & Vokes, 1988
- Murex spicatus Ponder & Vokes, 1988
- Murex spinastreptos Houart, 2010
- † Murex spinicosta Bronn, 1831
- Murex surinamensis Okutani, 1982
- Murex suttipraneeae Gra-tes, 2023
- † Murex tchihatcheffi d'Archiac & Haime, 1854
- Murex tenuirostrum Lamarck, 1822
- Murex ternispina Lamarck, 1822
- Murex trapa Roding, 1798 Rare-spined murex
- Murex tribulus Linnaeus, 1758, 1758: Caltrop murex
  - Murex tribulus spicatus
  - Murex tribulus tenuirostrum
  - Murex tribulus tenuirostrum africanus
  - Murex tribulus ternispina
- Murex troscheli Lischke, 1868 Troschel's murex

Species mentioned as species in current use in the Indo-Pacific Molluscan Database (OBIS)

- Murex singaporensis A.Adams, 1853

Species brought into synonymy

- Murex aedonius Watson, 1896: synonym of Coralliophila aedonia (Watson, 1885)
- Murex afer Gmelin, 1791: synonym of Afer afer (Gmelin, 1791)
- Murex alocatus: synonym of Pterymarchia barclayana (H. Adams, 1873)
- Murex antillarum : Antilles murex: synonym of Siratus articulatus (Reeve, 1845)
- Murex argo Clench & Farfante, 1945: synonym of Chicoreus (Triplex) spectrum (Reeve, 1846)
- Murex belcheri Hinds, 1843 : synonym of Forreria belcheri (Hinds, 1843)
- Murex bellus Reeve, 1845: synonym of Vokesimurex bellus (Reeve, 1845)
- Murex blakeanus Vokes, 1967: synonym of Vokesimurex blakeanus (Vokes, 1967)
- Murex brandaris Linnaeus, 1758: synonym of Bolinus brandaris (Linnaeus, 1758)
- Murex canaliculatus Linnaeus, 1758: synonym of Busycotypus canaliculatus (Linnaeus, 1758)
- Murex capitellum Linnaeus, 1758: synonym of Vasum capitellum (Linnaeus, 1758)
- Murex corallinus Scacchi, 1836: synonym of Ocinebrina aciculata (Lamarck, 1822)
- Murex corneus Linnaeus, 1758: synonym of Euthria cornea (Linnaeus, 1758)
- Murex coronatus Born, 1778: synonym of Pseudovertagus aluco (Linnaeus, 1758)
- Murex edwardsii: synonym of Ocinebrina edwardsii (Payraudeau, 1826)
- Murex garciai Petuch, 1987: synonym of Vokesimurex garciai (Petuch, 1987)
- Murex gubbi Reeve, 1849: synonym of Chicocenebra gubbi (Reeve, 1849)
- Murex inconspicuus G.B. Sowerby II, 1841: synonym of Ocinebrina aciculata (Lamarck, 1822)
- Murex intertextus Helbling, 1779: synonym of Cumia reticulata
- Murex jickelii Tapparone Canefri, 1875: synonym of Naquetia jickelii (Tapparone Canefri, 1875)
- Murex lindajoycae Petuch, 1987: synonym of Vokesimurex lindajoycae (Petuch, 1987)
- Murex longicornis Dunker, 1864: synonym of Chicoreus longicornis (Dunker, 1864)
- Murex maroccensis Gmelin, 1791: synonym of Fusinus maroccensis
- Murex monodon Sowerby, 1825: synonym of Chicoreus (Chicoreus) cornucervi (Röding, 1798)
- Murex nassa Gmelin, 1791: synonym of Leucozonia nassa (Gmelin, 1791)
- Murex nebula Montagu, 1803: synonym of Bela nebula (Montagu, 1803)
- Murex peritus Hinds, 1844a: synonym of Favartia (Favartia) perita (Hinds, 1844)
- Murex pistacia Reeve, 1845: synonym of Ocinebrina aciculata (Lamarck, 1822)
- Murex purpuroides Dunker: synonym of Vaughtia purpuroides (Reeve, 1845)
- Murex recurvirostris: synonym of Vokesimurex recurvirostrum (Broderip, 1833)
- Murex rota Sowerby: synonym of Homalocantha anatomica (Perry, 1811)
- Murex rubidus: synonym of Vokesimurex rubidus (F.C. Baker, 1897)
- Murex serratospinosus Dunker, 1883: synonym of Vokesimurex mindanaoensis (G.B. Sowerby II, 1841)
- Murex subaciculatus Locard, 1886: synonym of Ocinebrina aciculata (Lamarck, 1822)
- Murex taxus Dillwyn, 1817: synonym of Clavatula taxea (Röding, 1798)
- † Murex textilis Brocchi, 1814: synonym of † Rimosodaphnella textilis (Brocchi, 1814)
- Murex triqueter: synonym of Naquetia triqueter (Born, 1778)
- Murex tulipa Linnaeus, 1758: synonym of Fasciolaria tulipa (Linnaeus, 1758)
- Murex turbinellus Linnaeus, 1758: synonym of Vasum turbinellus (Linnaeus, 1758)
- Murex vittatus Broderip, 1833: synonym of Favartia (Favartia) vittata (Broderip, 1833)
