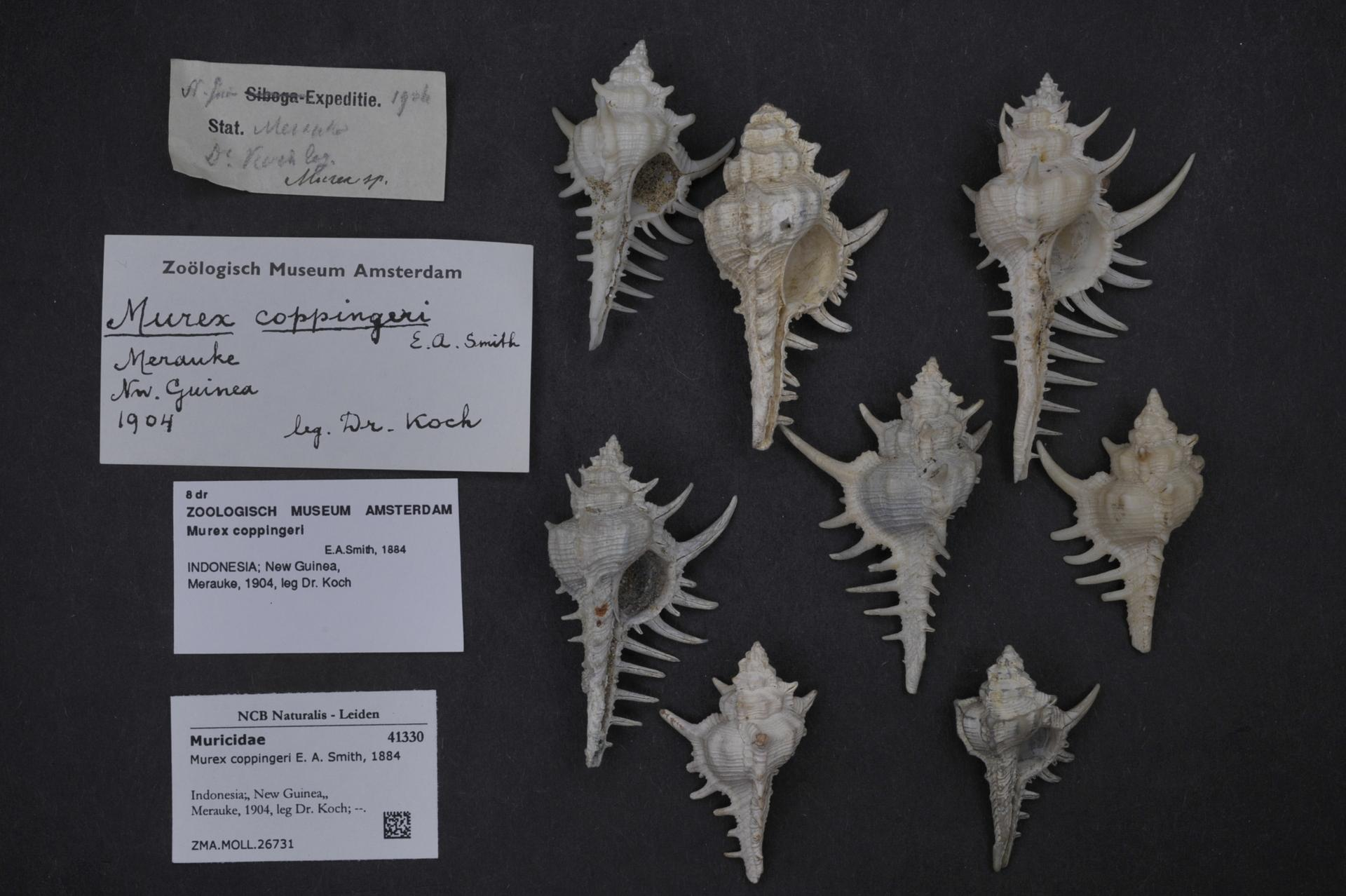

Scientific classification
- Kingdom: Animalia
- Phylum: Mollusca
- Class: Gastropoda
- Subclass: Caenogastropoda
- Order: Neogastropoda
- Family: Muricidae
- Genus: Murex
- Species: M. coppingeri

Binomial name
- Murex coppingeri E. A. Smith, 1884

Synonyms
- Murex (Murex) coppingeri E. A. Smith, 1884· accepted, alternate representation

= Murex coppingeri =

Species of gastropod

Murex coppingeri is a species of large predatory sea snail, a marine gastropod mollusk in the family Muricidae, the rock snails or murex snails.

== Distribution ==
This species occurs in the Arafura Sea.
