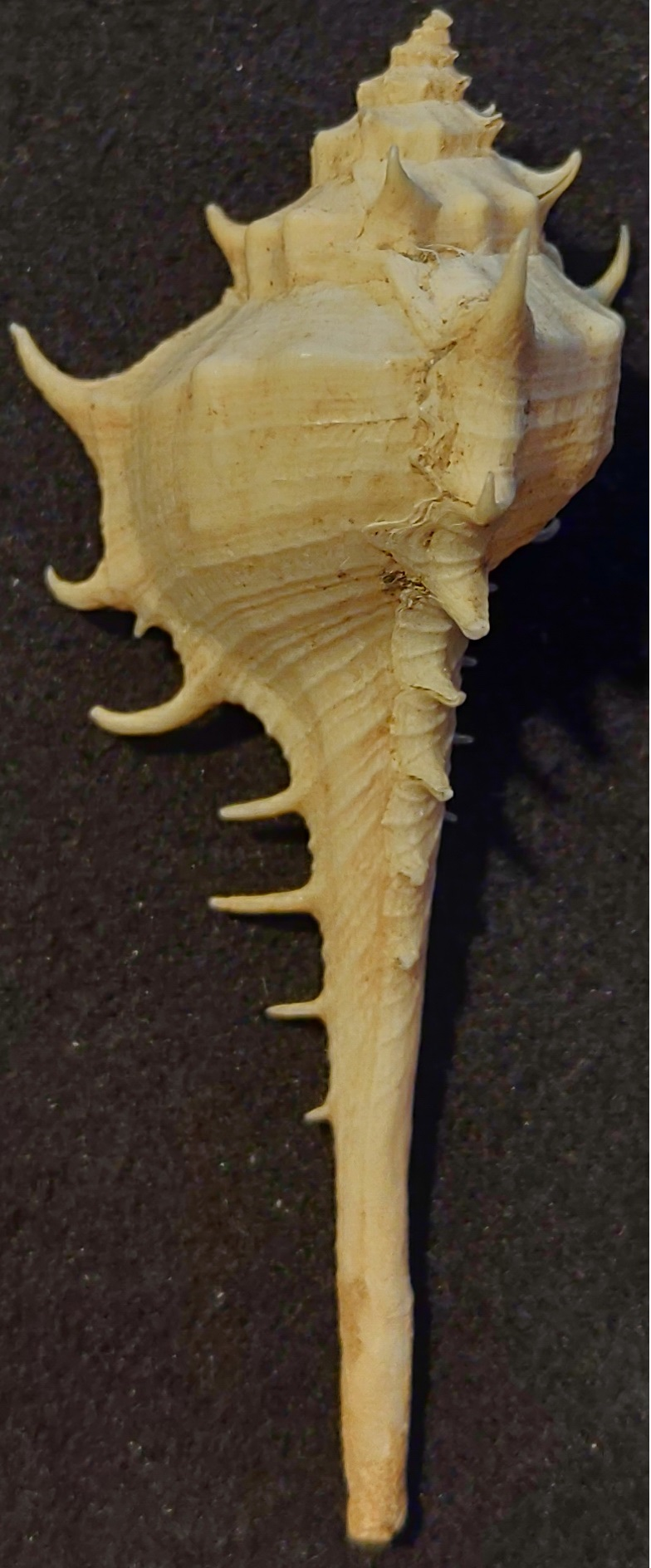

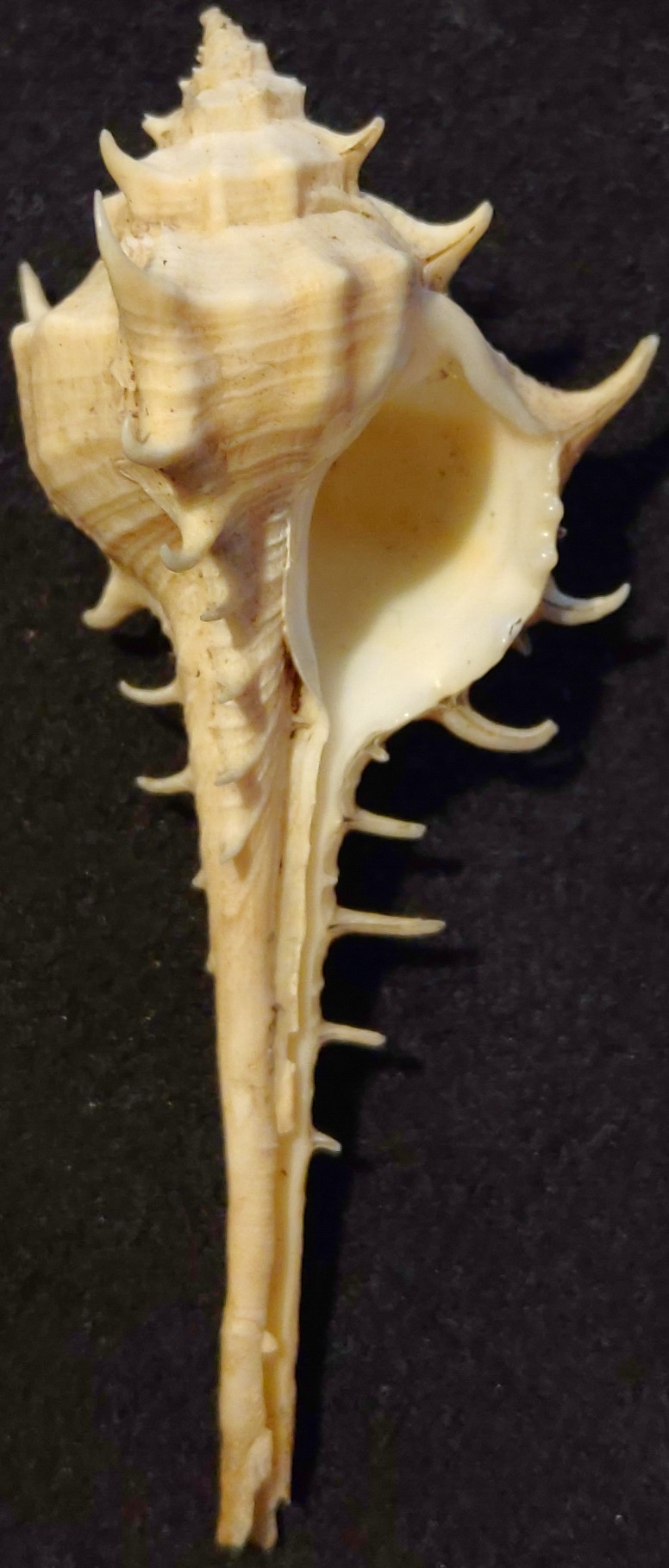

Scientific classification
- Kingdom: Animalia
- Phylum: Mollusca
- Class: Gastropoda
- Subclass: Caenogastropoda
- Order: Neogastropoda
- Family: Muricidae
- Genus: Murex
- Species: M. occa

Binomial name
- Murex occa G. B. Sowerby II, 1834

Synonyms
- Murex (Murex) occa G. B. Sowerby II, 1834· accepted, alternate representation; † Murex lebacanus K. Martin, 1895

= Murex occa =

Species of gastropod

Murex occa, harrowed murex, is a species of large predatory sea snail, a marine gastropod mollusk in the family Muricidae, the rock snails or murex snails.
