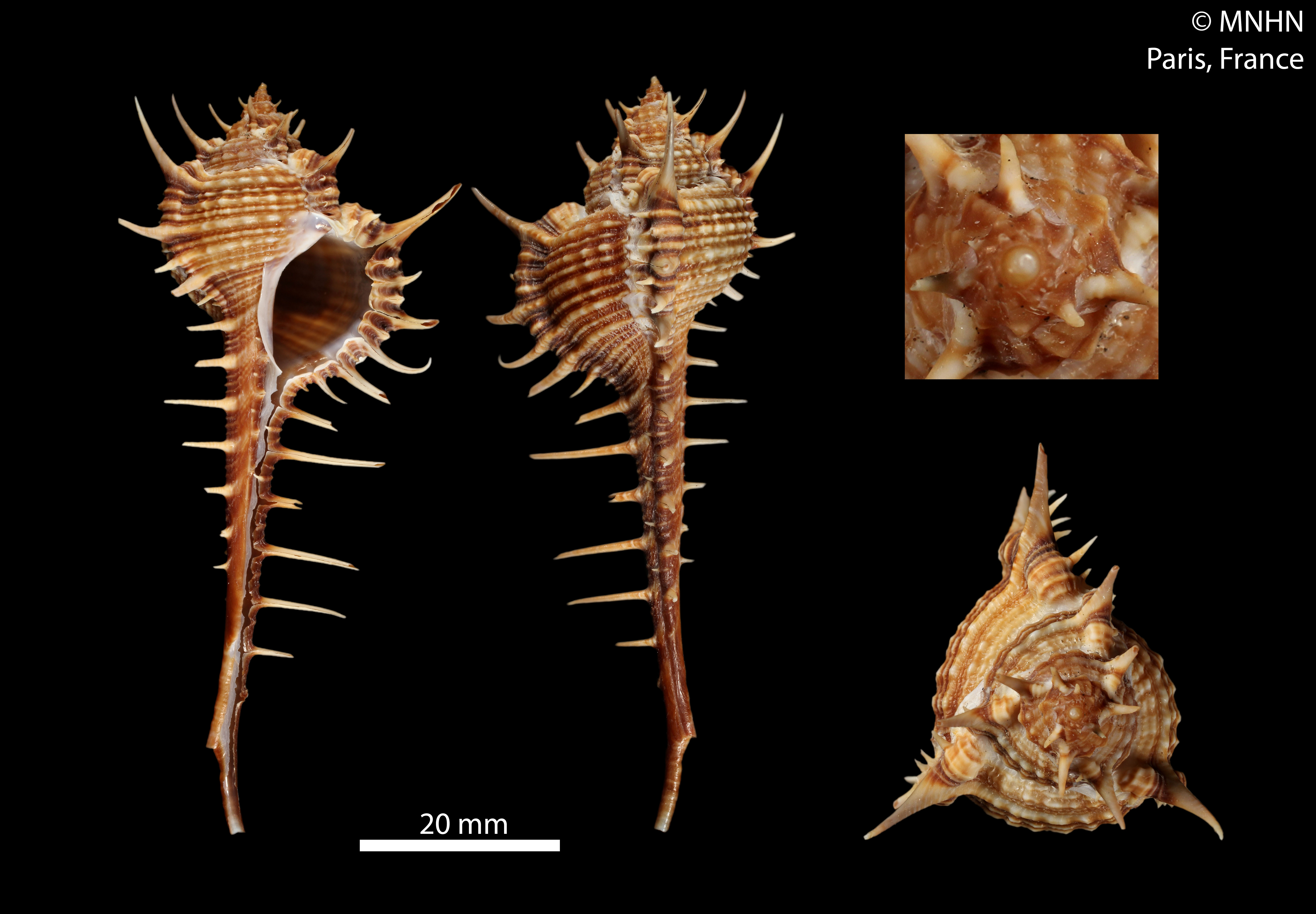
- Shell of Murex hystricosus (paratype at MNHN, Paris)

Scientific classification
- Kingdom: Animalia
- Phylum: Mollusca
- Class: Gastropoda
- Subclass: Caenogastropoda
- Order: Neogastropoda
- Family: Muricidae
- Genus: Murex
- Species: M. hystricosus

Binomial name
- Murex hystricosus Houart & Dharma, 2001

Synonyms
- Murex (Murex) hystricosus Houart & Dharma, 2001· accepted, alternate representation

= Murex hystricosus =

Species of gastropod

Murex hystricosus is a species of large predatory sea snail, a marine gastropod mollusk in the family Muricidae, the rock snails or murex snails.

== Distribution ==
This marine species occurs off Sumatra, Indonesia.
