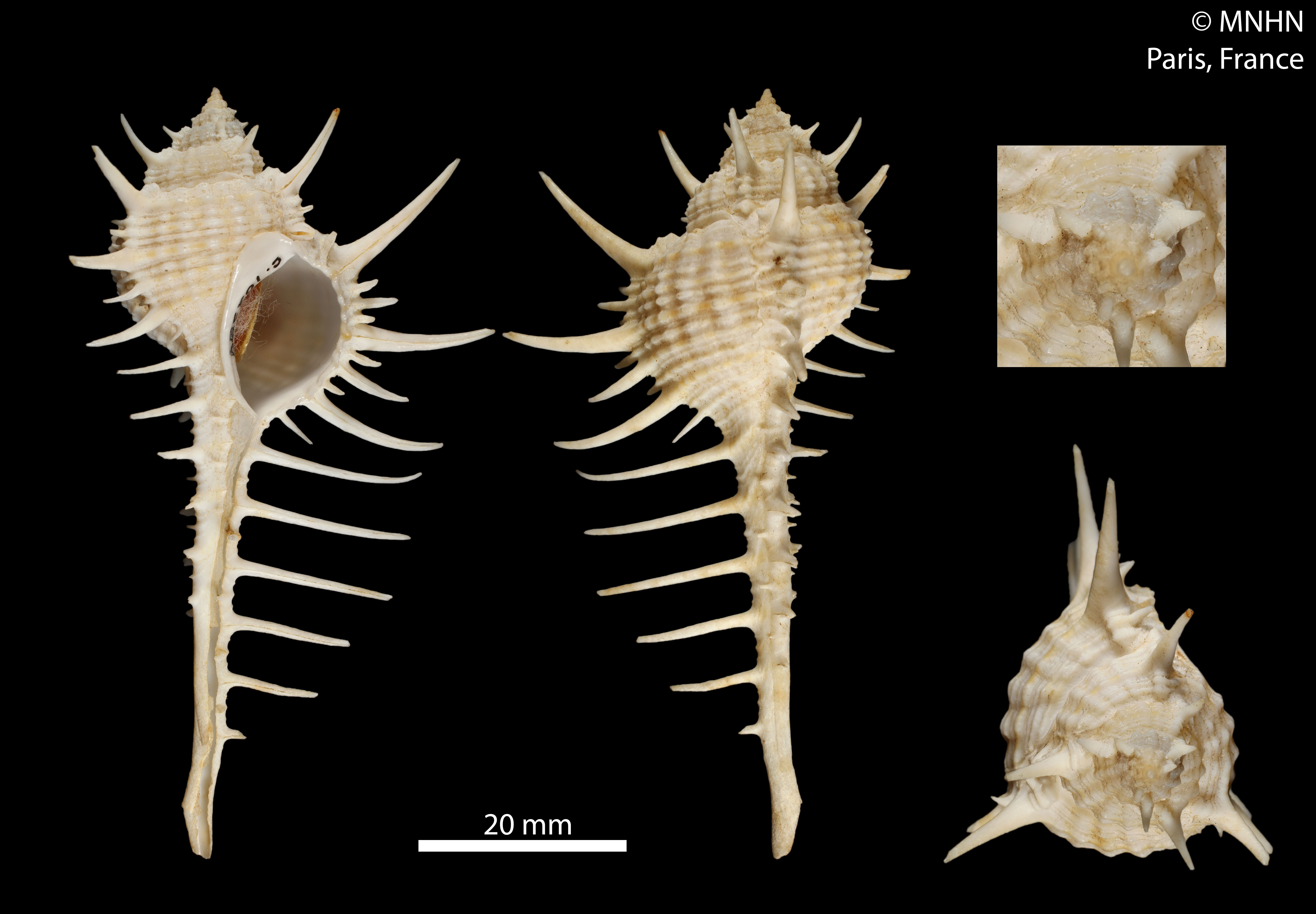
- Shell of Murex queenslandicus (paratype at MNHN, Paris)

Scientific classification
- Kingdom: Animalia
- Phylum: Mollusca
- Class: Gastropoda
- Subclass: Caenogastropoda
- Order: Neogastropoda
- Family: Muricidae
- Genus: Murex
- Species: M. queenslandicus

Binomial name
- Murex queenslandicus Ponder & Vokes, 1988

Synonyms
- Murex (Murex) queenslandicus Ponder & Vokes, 1988· accepted, alternate representation

= Murex queenslandicus =

Species of gastropod

Murex queenslandicus is a species of large predatory sea snail, a marine gastropod mollusk in the family Muricidae, the rock snails or murex snails.

== Distribution ==
This marine species occurs off Queensland, Australia
