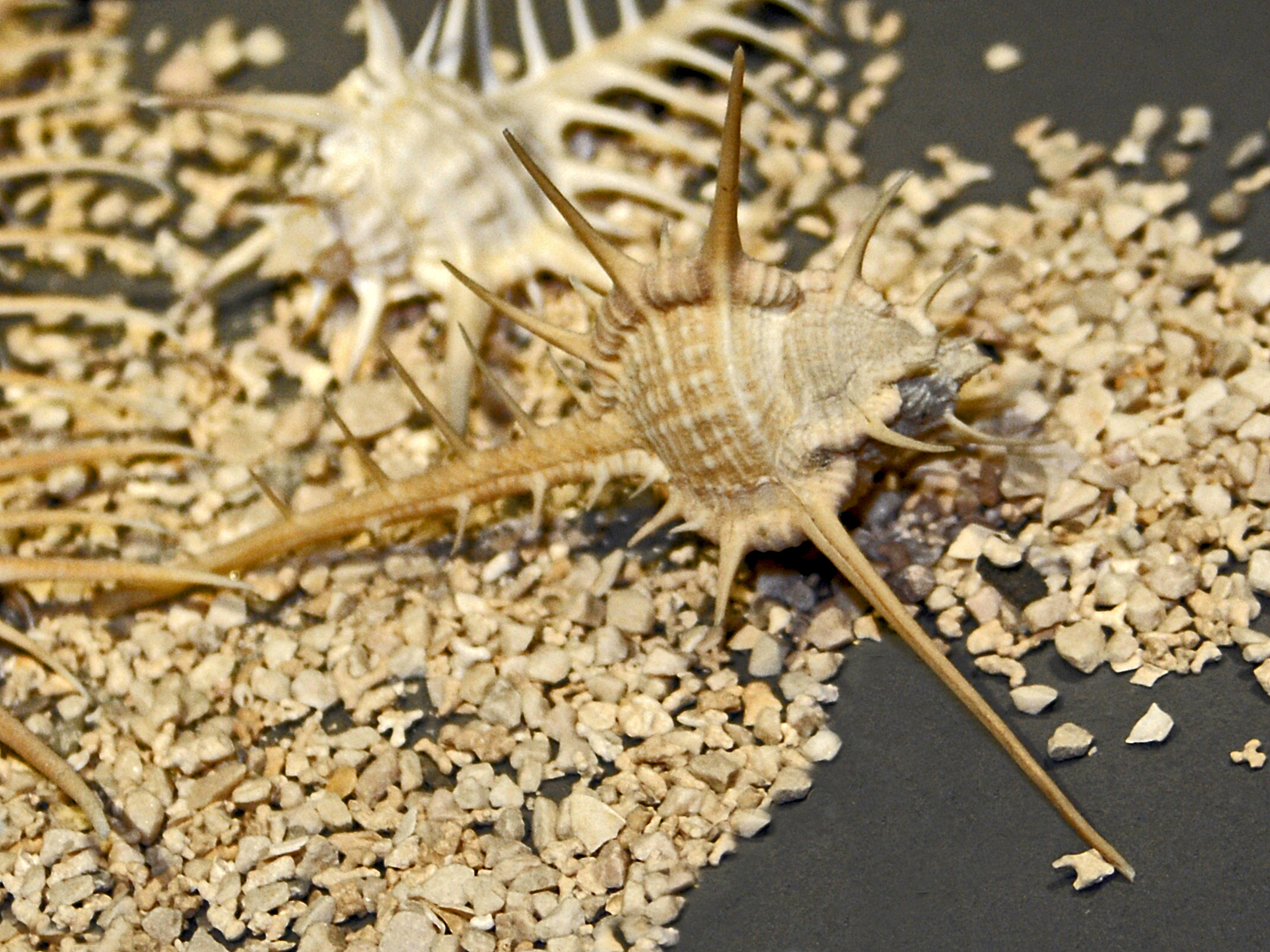
- A shell of Murex tribulus

Scientific classification
- Kingdom: Animalia
- Phylum: Mollusca
- Class: Gastropoda
- Subclass: Caenogastropoda
- Order: Neogastropoda
- Family: Muricidae
- Genus: Murex
- Species: M. tribulus

Binomial name
- Murex tribulus Linnaeus, 1758

Synonyms
- Murex pecten Montfort, 1810

= Murex tribulus =

Species of gastropod

Murex tribulus, the caltrop murex, is a species of large predatory sea snail, a marine gastropod mollusc in the family Muricidae, the rock snails or murex snails.

== Description ==
The shell of Murex tribulus can reach a length of 65–160 millimetres (2.6–6.3 in). This quite common snail has a shell with a very long siphonal canal and numerous very long, fragile and acute spines, providing protection against predators. It feeds on other mollusks.

== Distribution ==
This species is widespread from Central Indian Ocean to Western Pacific Ocean.
