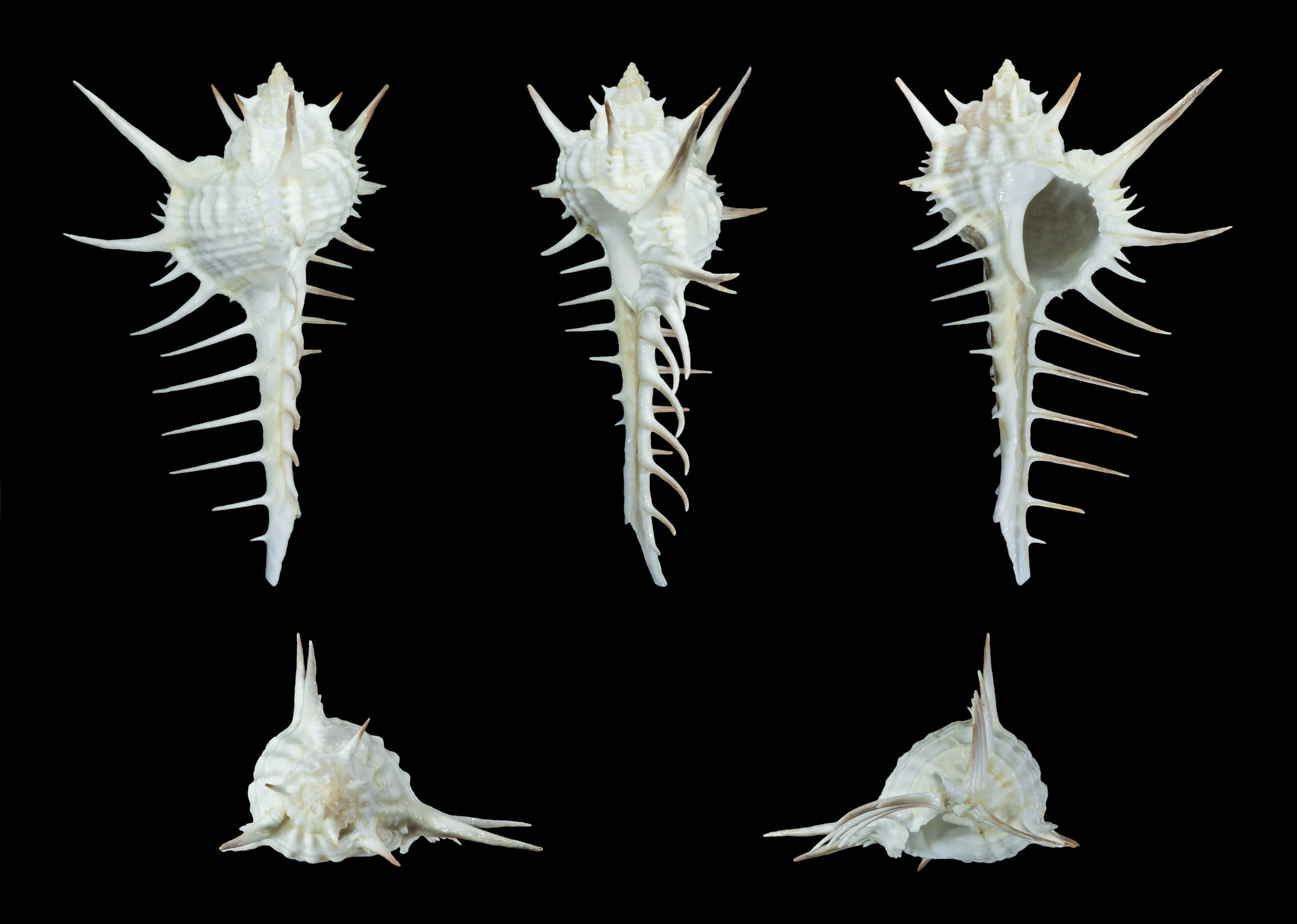
- Murex ternispina shell

Scientific classification
- Kingdom: Animalia
- Phylum: Mollusca
- Class: Gastropoda
- Subclass: Caenogastropoda
- Order: Neogastropoda
- Family: Muricidae
- Genus: Murex
- Species: M. ternispina

Binomial name
- Murex ternispina Lamarck, 1822

Synonyms
- Murex nigrispinosus Reeve, 1845

= Murex ternispina =

Species of gastropod

Murex ternispina (formerly known as Murex nigrispinosus) is a species of sea snail, a marine gastropod mollusk in the family Muricidae, the murex snails or rock snails.

== Distribution ==
It mainly occurs in the Western Pacific Ocean.

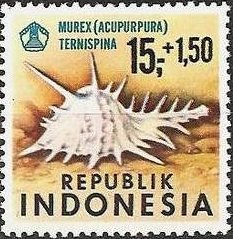
Murex ternispina on a 1969 Indonesia postage stamp.
