= Murex somalicus =

Scientific classification
- Kingdom: Animalia
- Phylum: Mollusca
- Class: Gastropoda
- Subclass: Caenogastropoda
- Order: Neogastropoda
- Family: Muricidae
- Genus: Murex
- Species: M. somalicus

Binomial name
- Murex somalicus Parth, 1990

Species of gastropod

Murex somalicus is a species of large predatory sea snail, a marine gastropod mollusk in the family Muricidae, the rock snails or murex snails.

== Description ==
Original description: "Very large shell (up to 190 mm.) with 7 loose whorls and 3 weak varices per whorl. The spiral sculpture is made up of 4 distinct cords which, when they go over the varices, form 4 spiny processes pointing in the direction of the apex. The spine of the first adapical cord (towards the shoulder) is shorter, while the other 3 spines clearly increase in length as they get nearer the siphonal canal. This has 5 strong and long spines (the first is near the point of separation between the external and internal lips) which decrease in length towards the end of the canal: among the main spines there are smaller ones which make an angle of about 90 degrees with the stronger spines. Very weak axial sculpture on the last whorls, only on the first whorls radial riblets are visible. The aperture is elongated oval, white, the calliosity of the internal lip reaches the spines of the preceding whorl, the external lip ends in the superior zone in a posterior canal, or anal, very long and wide.
Between the third and the fourth spine is the labral tooth, typical of the genus Mures s.s. The colouring is darker in the area of the varices, almost rusty red, while at the centre of the whorls, among the varices it is lighter, tending towards cream.
The protoconch is paucispiral, with 2, 1/2 rounded whorls of a very variable diameter. Operculum unknown."

== Distribution ==
Locus typicus: "Coast of Somalia,
unfortunately without any reliable precision."
