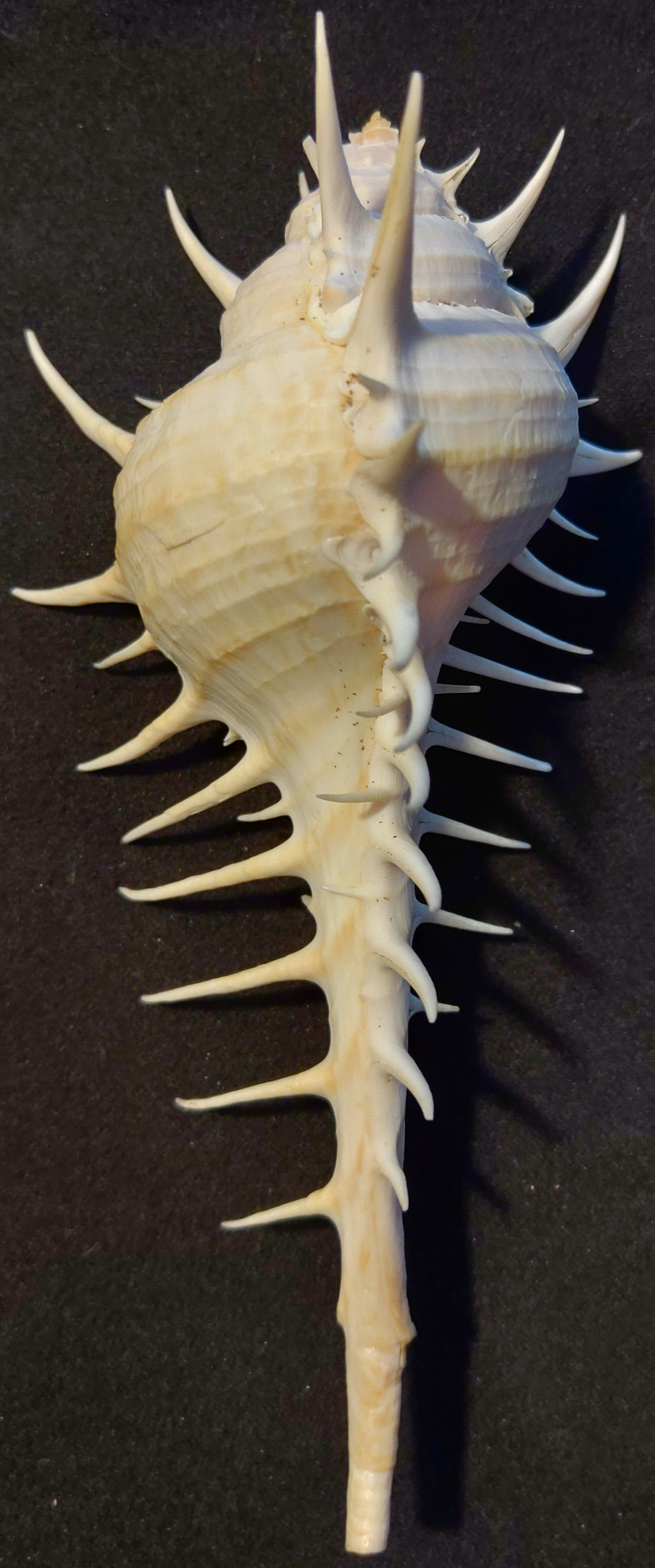

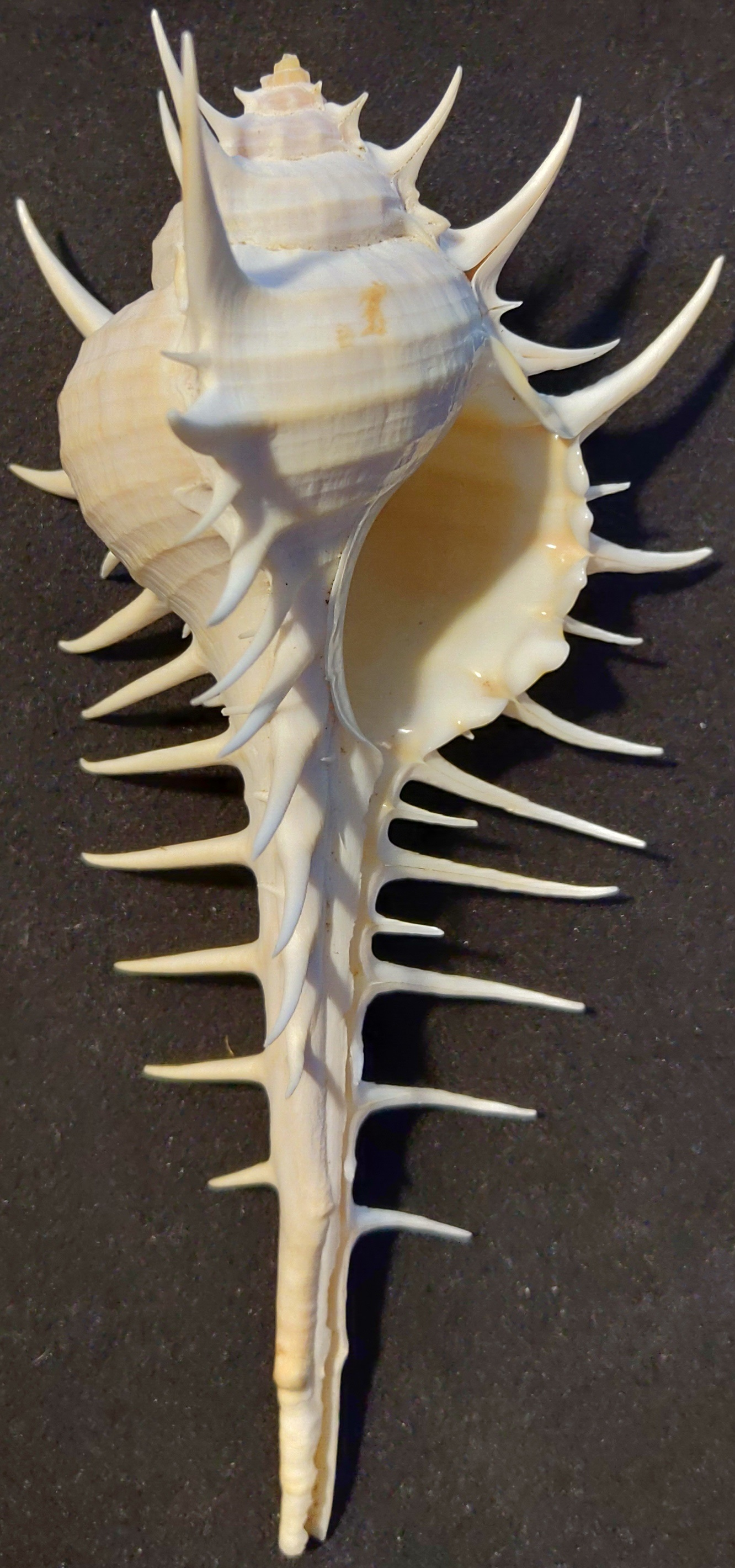

Scientific classification
- Kingdom: Animalia
- Phylum: Mollusca
- Class: Gastropoda
- Subclass: Caenogastropoda
- Order: Neogastropoda
- Family: Muricidae
- Genus: Murex
- Species: M. scolopax

Binomial name
- Murex scolopax Dillwyn, 1817

= Murex scolopax =

Species of gastropod

Murex scolopax, also known as the false venus comb or woodcock murex, is a species of large predatory sea snail, a marine gastropod mollusk in the family Muricidae, the rock snails or murex snails.
