= Murex singaporensis =

Murex (Murex) singaporensis

Scientific classification
- Kingdom: Animalia
- Phylum: Mollusca
- Class: Gastropoda
- Subclass: Caenogastropoda
- Order: Neogastropoda
- Family: Muricidae
- Genus: Murex
- Species: M. singaporensis

Binomial name
- Murex singaporensis A.Adams, 1853

Species of gastropod

Murex (Murex) singaporensis is a species of large predatory sea snail, a marine gastropod mollusk in the family Muricidae, the rock snails or murex snails.

The status of species is uncertain as unassessed.
