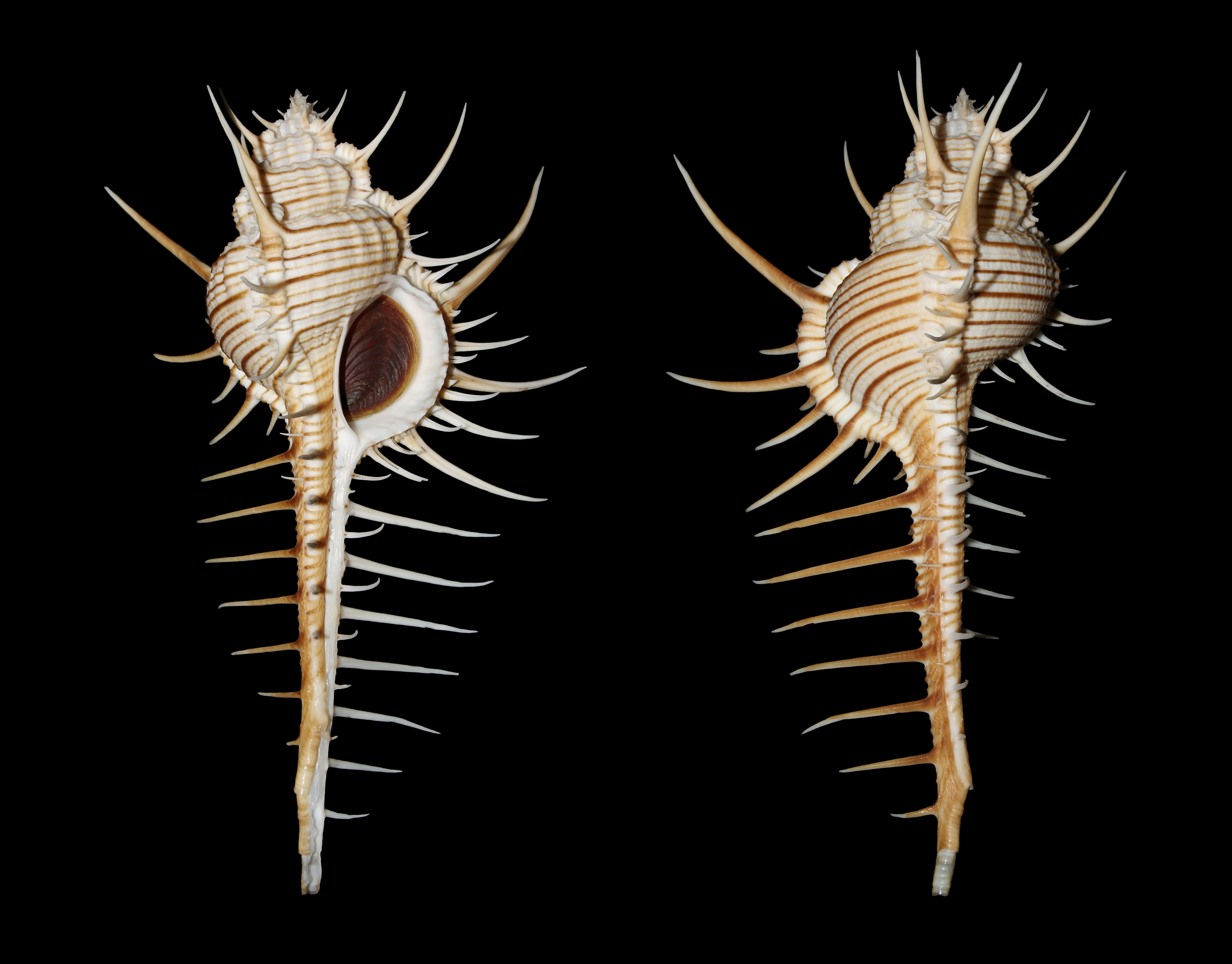
- A shell of Murex troscheli.

Scientific classification
- Kingdom: Animalia
- Phylum: Mollusca
- Class: Gastropoda
- Subclass: Caenogastropoda
- Order: Neogastropoda
- Family: Muricidae
- Genus: Murex
- Species: M. troscheli

Binomial name
- Murex troscheli Lischke, 1868

= Murex troscheli =

Species of mollusc

Murex troscheli, also known as Troschel's murex, is a species of large predatory sea snail, a marine gastropod mollusk in the family Muricidae, the rock snails or murex snails.
