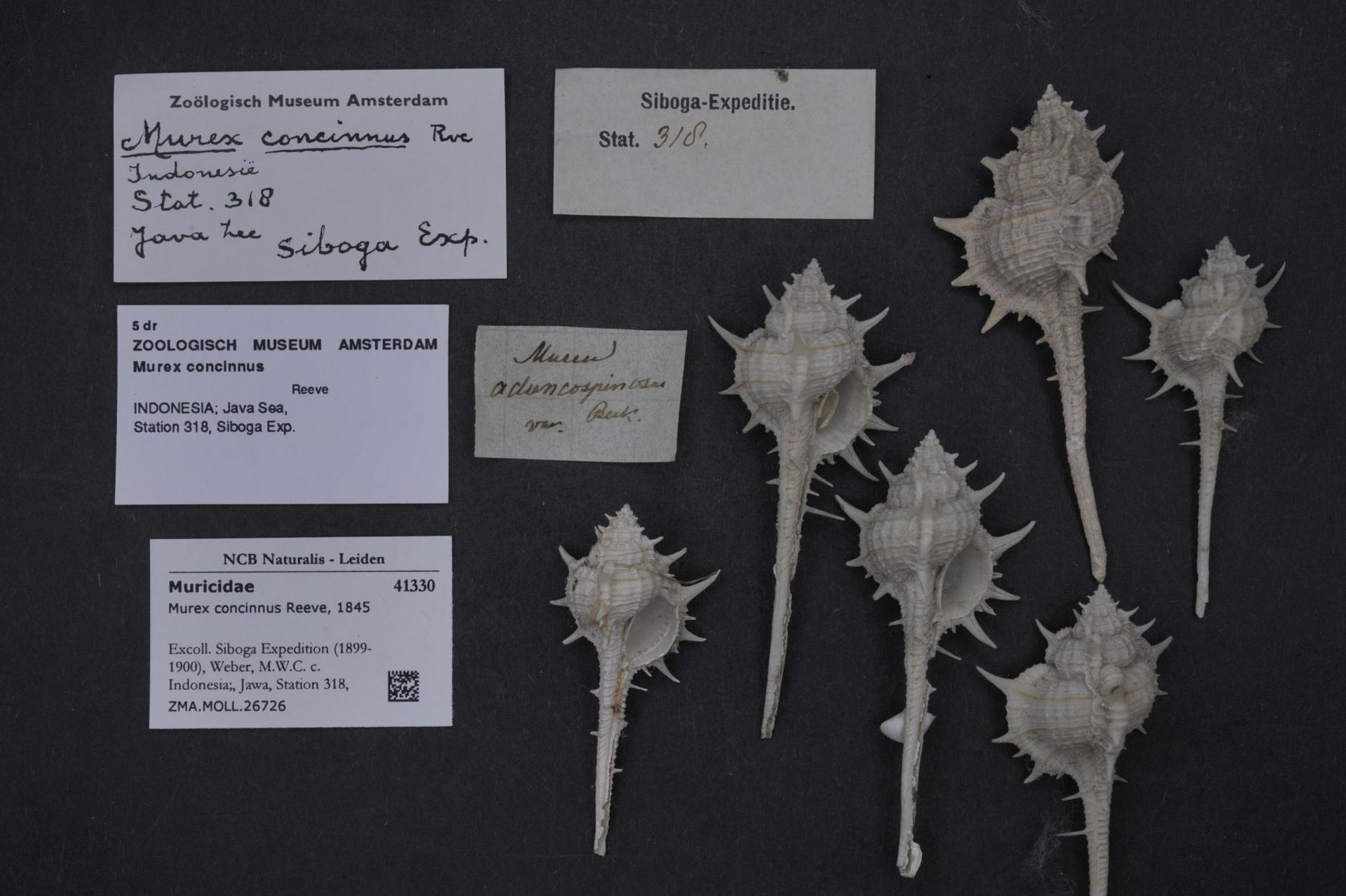

Scientific classification
- Kingdom: Animalia
- Phylum: Mollusca
- Class: Gastropoda
- Subclass: Caenogastropoda
- Order: Neogastropoda
- Family: Muricidae
- Genus: Murex
- Species: M. concinnus

Binomial name
- Murex concinnus Reeve, 1845

Synonyms
- Murex (Murex) concinnus Reeve, 1845· accepted, alternate representation

= Murex concinnus =

Species of gastropod

Murex concinnus is a species of large predatory sea snail, a marine gastropod mollusk in the family Muricidae, the rock snails or murex snails.
