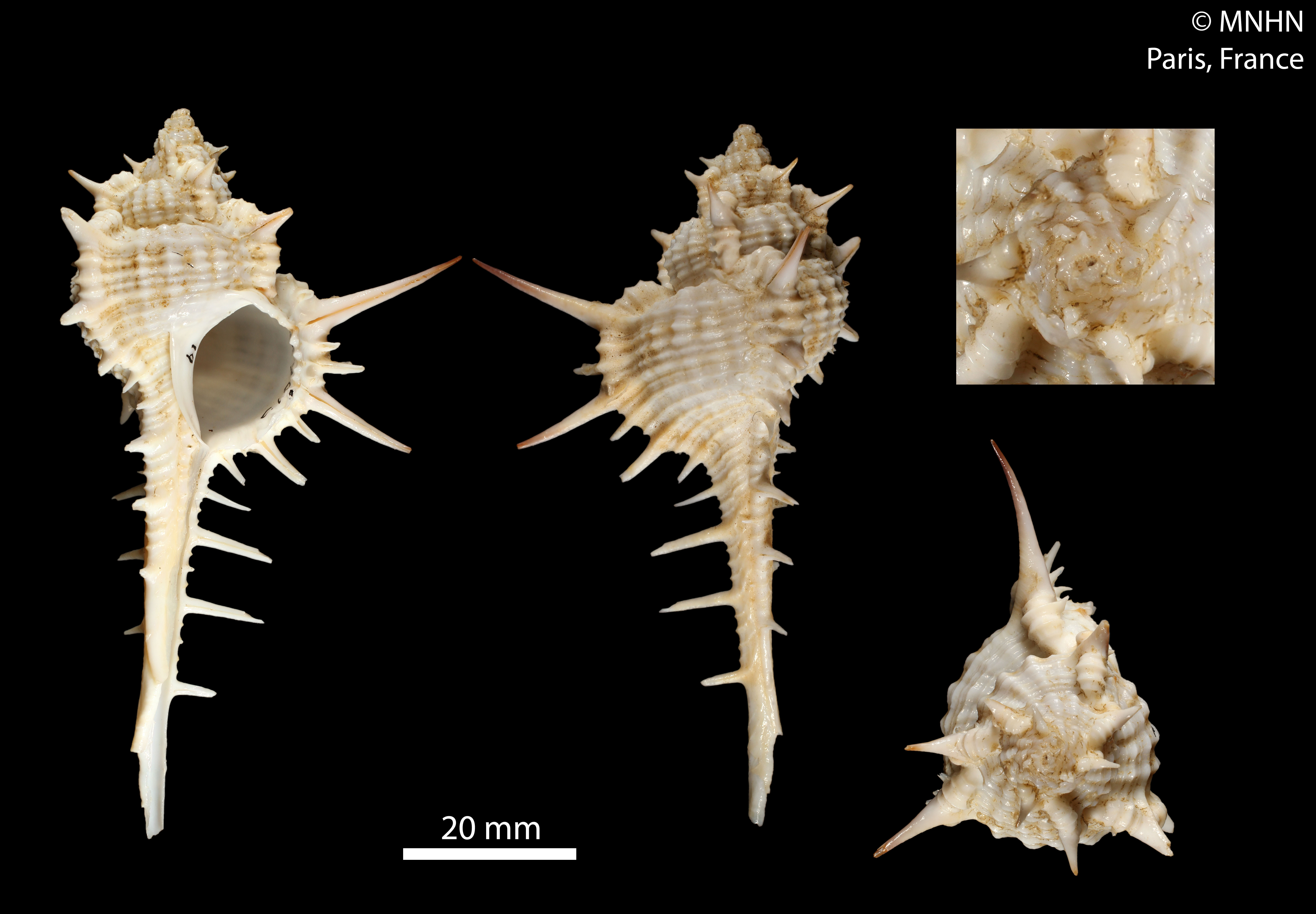

Scientific classification
- Kingdom: Animalia
- Phylum: Mollusca
- Class: Gastropoda
- Subclass: Caenogastropoda
- Order: Neogastropoda
- Family: Muricidae
- Genus: Murex
- Species: M. kerslakae

Binomial name
- Murex kerslakae Ponder & Vokes, 1988

Synonyms
- Murex (Murex) kerslakae Ponder & Vokes, 1988· accepted, alternate representation

= Murex kerslakae =

Species of gastropod

Murex kerslakae is a species of sea snail, a marine gastropod mollusk in the family Muricidae, the murex snails or rock snails.

== Distribution ==
This marine species occurs off Queensland, Australia
