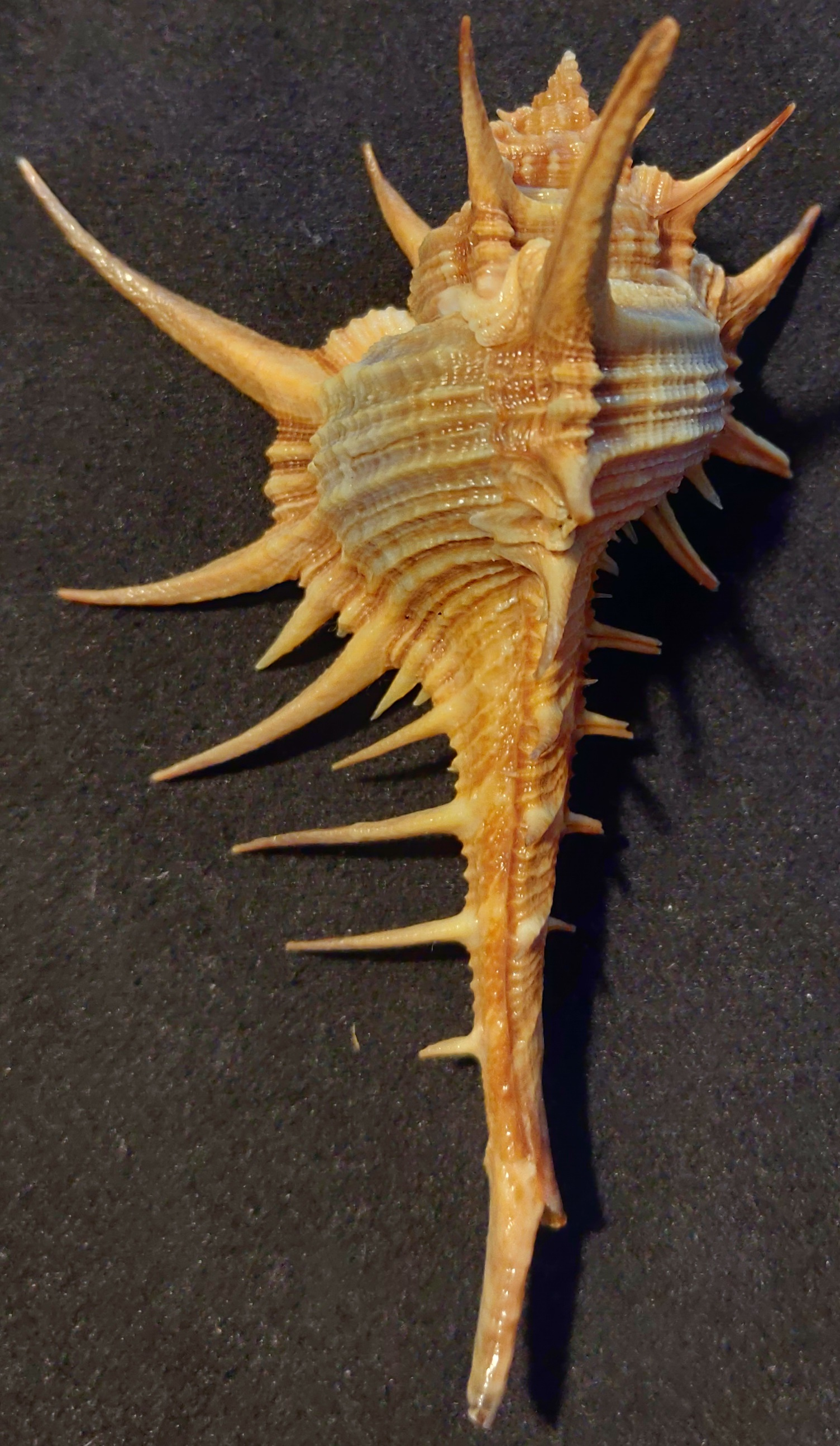

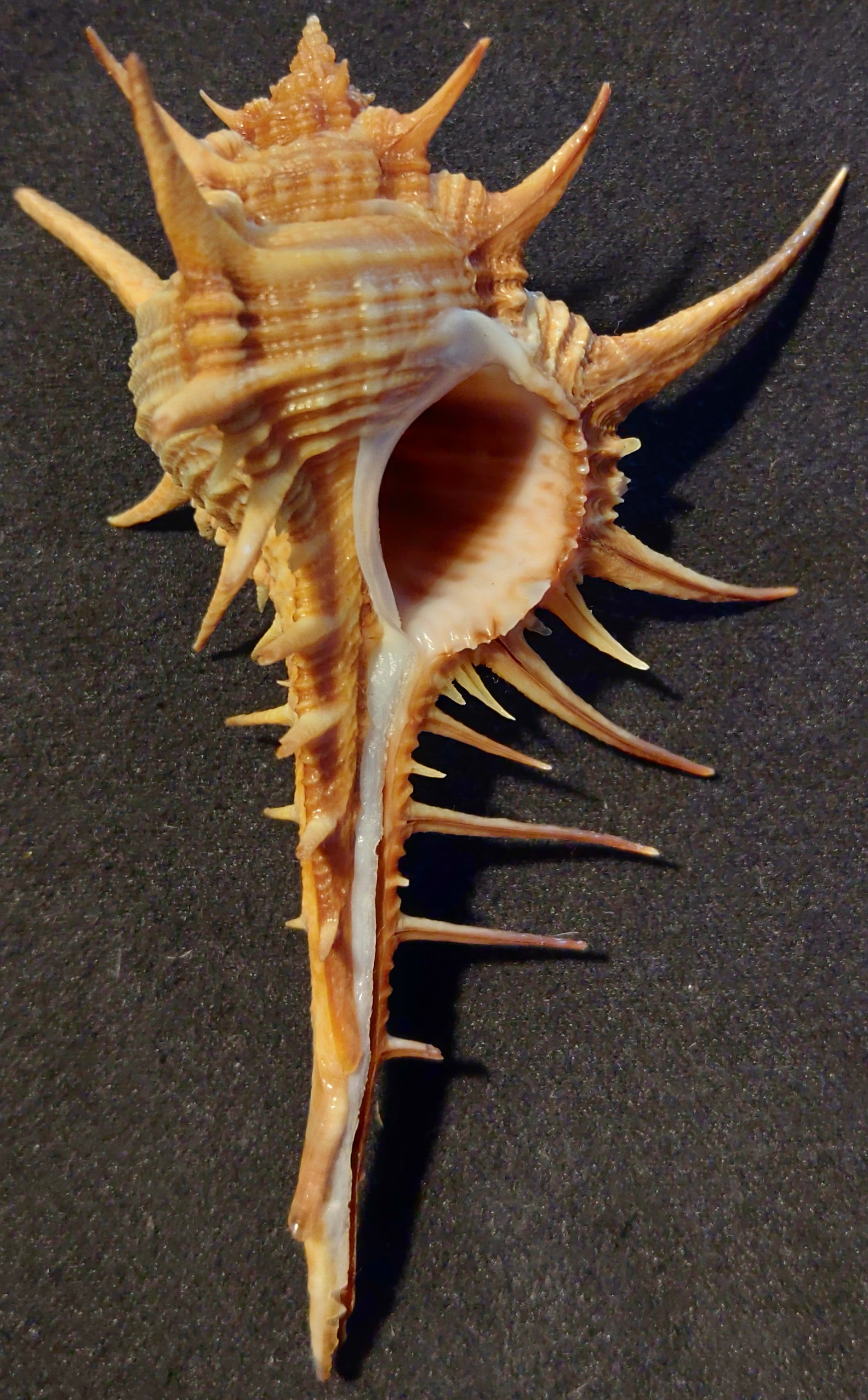

Scientific classification
- Kingdom: Animalia
- Phylum: Mollusca
- Class: Gastropoda
- Subclass: Caenogastropoda
- Order: Neogastropoda
- Family: Muricidae
- Genus: Murex
- Species: M. falsitribulus

Binomial name
- Murex falsitribulus Ponder & E. H. Vokes, 1988

Synonyms
- Murex (Murex) falsitribulus Ponder & Vokes, 1988· accepted, alternate representation

= Murex falsitribulus =

Species of gastropod

Murex falsitribulus is a species of large predatory sea snail, a marine gastropod mollusk in the family Muricidae, the rock snails or murex snails.
