= Murex djarianensis =

Scientific classification
- Kingdom: Animalia
- Phylum: Mollusca
- Class: Gastropoda
- Subclass: Caenogastropoda
- Order: Neogastropoda
- Family: Muricidae
- Genus: Murex
- Species: M. djarianensis

Binomial name
- Murex djarianensis Martin, 1895

Species of gastropod

Murex djarianensis is a species of large predatory sea snail, a marine gastropod mollusk in the family Muricidae, the rock snails or murex snails.

== Subspecies ==
- Murex djarianensis poppei Houart, 1979
