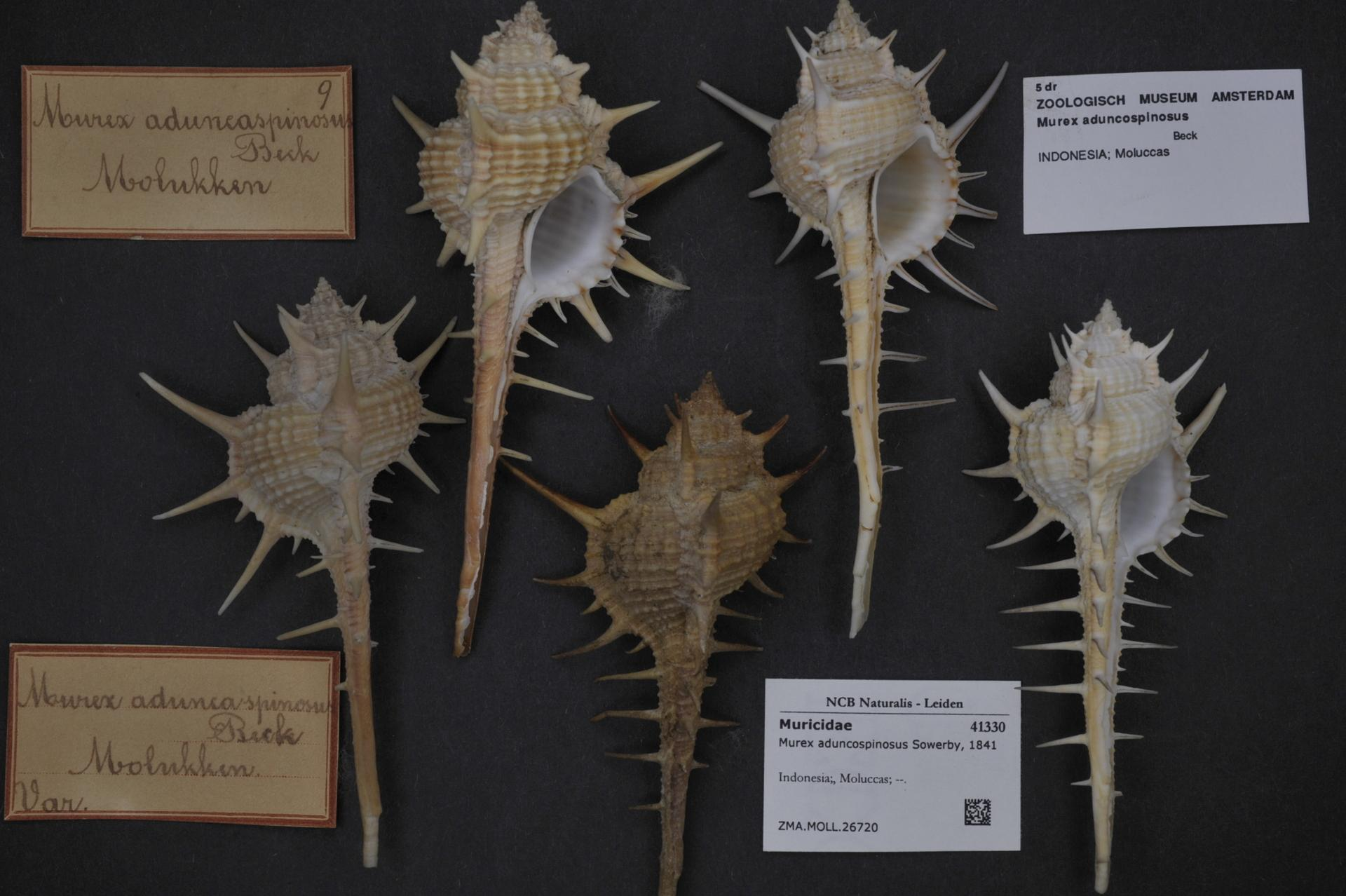

Scientific classification
- Kingdom: Animalia
- Phylum: Mollusca
- Class: Gastropoda
- Subclass: Caenogastropoda
- Order: Neogastropoda
- Family: Muricidae
- Genus: Murex
- Species: M. aduncospinosus

Binomial name
- Murex aduncospinosus Sowerby II, 1841

Synonyms
- Murex (Murex) aduncospinosus G. B. Sowerby II, 1841· accepted, alternate representation; Murex ternispina var. aduncospinosus G. B. Sowerby II, 1841 (original combination)

= Murex aduncospinosus =

Species of gastropod

Murex aduncospinosus, also known as the Short-spined murex, is a species of large predatory sea snail, a marine gastropod mollusk in the family Muricidae, the rock snails or murex snails.
