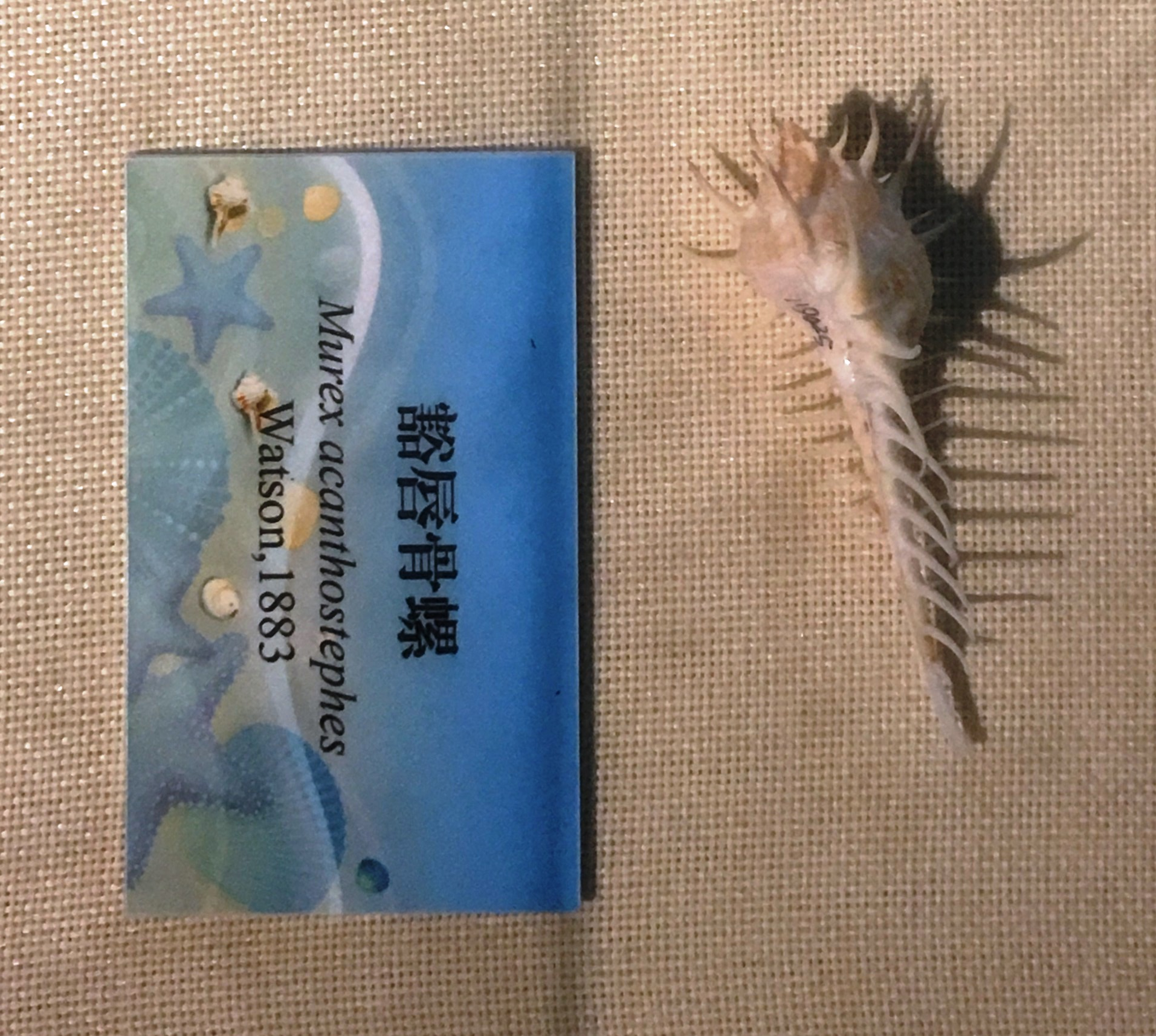
- Shell of Murex acanthostephes (specimen at Beijing Museum of Natural History)

Scientific classification
- Kingdom: Animalia
- Phylum: Mollusca
- Class: Gastropoda
- Subclass: Caenogastropoda
- Order: Neogastropoda
- Family: Muricidae
- Genus: Murex
- Species: M. acanthostephes

Binomial name
- Murex acanthostephes Watson, 1883

Synonyms
- Murex (Murex) acanthostephes R. B. Watson, 1883· accepted, alternate representation

= Murex acanthostephes =

Species of gastropod

Murex acanthostephes is a species of large predatory sea snail, a marine gastropod mollusk in the family Muricidae, the rock snails or murex snails.

== Description ==
Shell size 90-100 mm.

== Distribution ==
Found on reefs at low tide: North West Australia.
