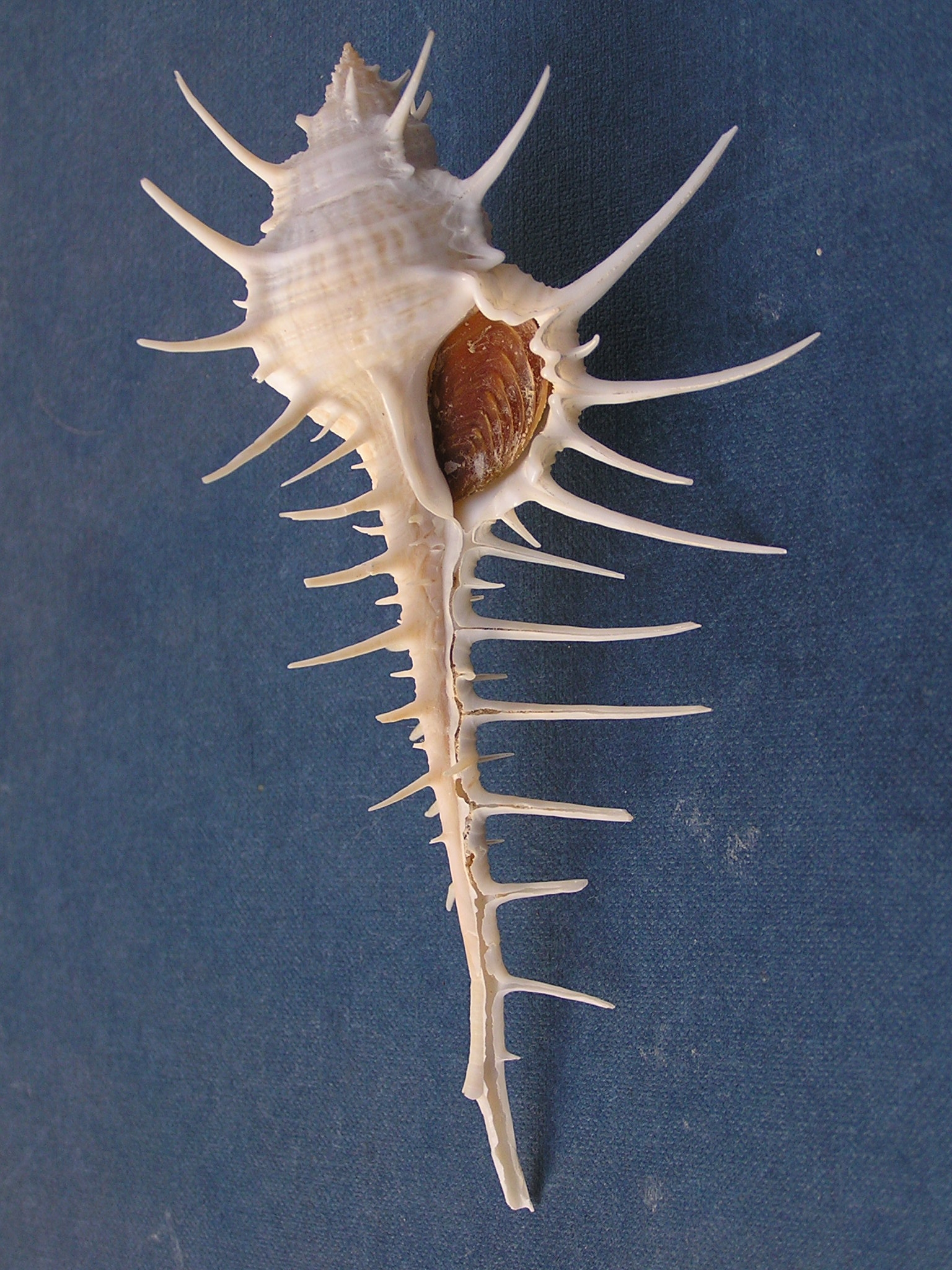
- Murex altispira

Scientific classification
- Kingdom: Animalia
- Phylum: Mollusca
- Class: Gastropoda
- Subclass: Caenogastropoda
- Order: Neogastropoda
- Family: Muricidae
- Genus: Murex
- Species: M. altispira

Binomial name
- Murex altispira Ponder & Vokes, 1988

Synonyms
- Murex (Murex) altispira Ponder & Vokes, 1988· accepted, alternate representation

= Murex altispira =

Species of gastropod

Murex altispira, also known as the Caltrop murex, is a species of large predatory sea snail, a marine gastropod mollusk in the family Muricidae, the rock snails or murex snails.
