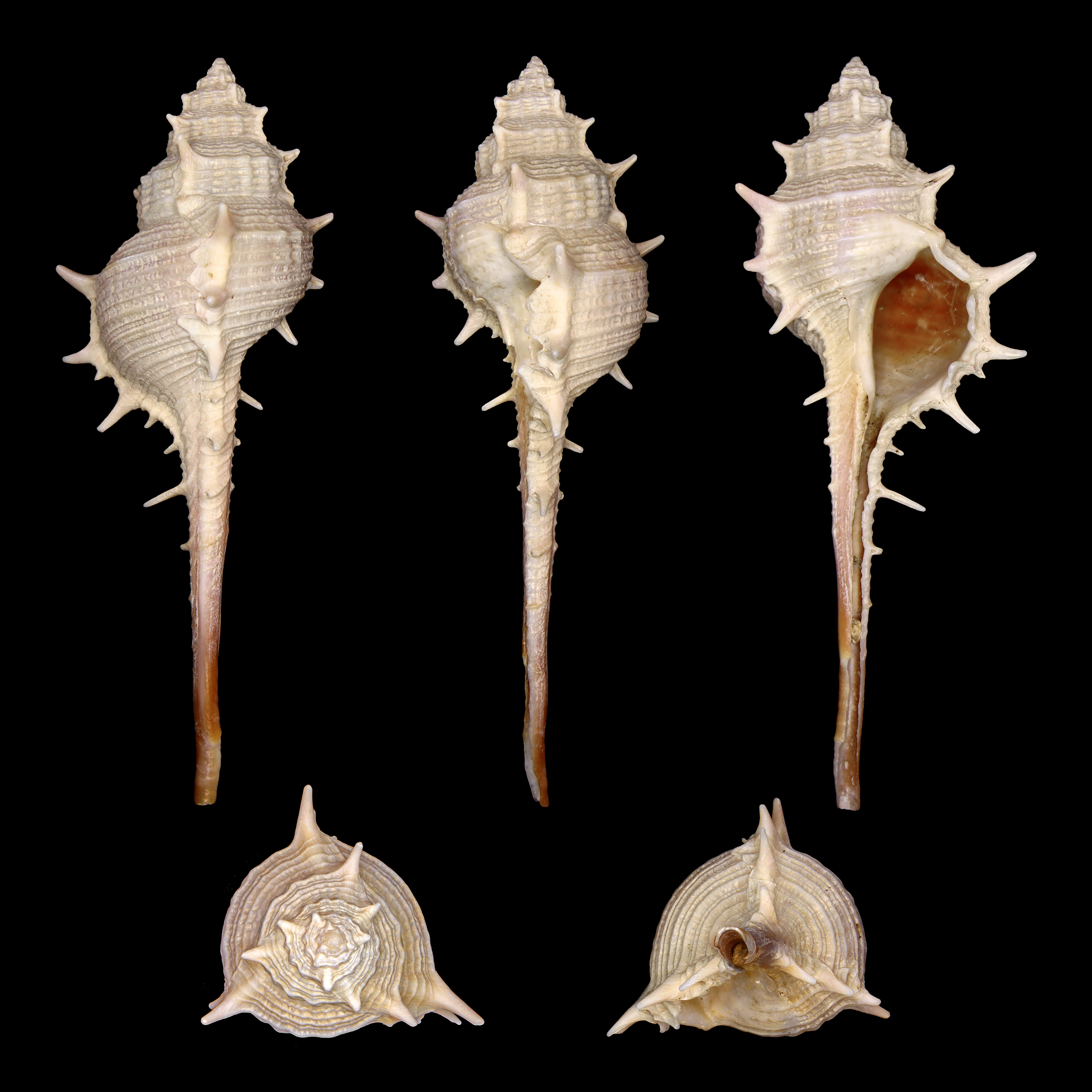
- Murex trapa

Scientific classification
- Kingdom: Animalia
- Phylum: Mollusca
- Class: Gastropoda
- Subclass: Caenogastropoda
- Order: Neogastropoda
- Family: Muricidae
- Genus: Murex
- Species: M. trapa

Binomial name
- Murex trapa Röding, 1798

Synonyms
- Murex (Murex) trapa Röding, 1798 · accepted, alternate representation; Murex duplicatus sensu Chemnitz Pusch, 1837 (invalid: junior homonym of Murex duplicatus Donovan, 1804); Murex martinianus Reeve, 1845; Murex rarispina Lamarck, 1822; Murex unindentatus Sowerby, 1834

= Murex trapa =

Species of gastropod

Murex trapa, common name the rare-spined murex, is a species of sea snail, a marine gastropod mollusc of the family Muricidae, the rock snails.

== Distribution ==
This species is widespread from Madagascar and Mascarene Islands, South-Eastern India, Sri Lanka and the Andaman Sea to southern Indonesia, Philippines, Taiwan and Southern Japan.

== Habitat ==
Murex trapa can be found in demersal, sandy habitats.

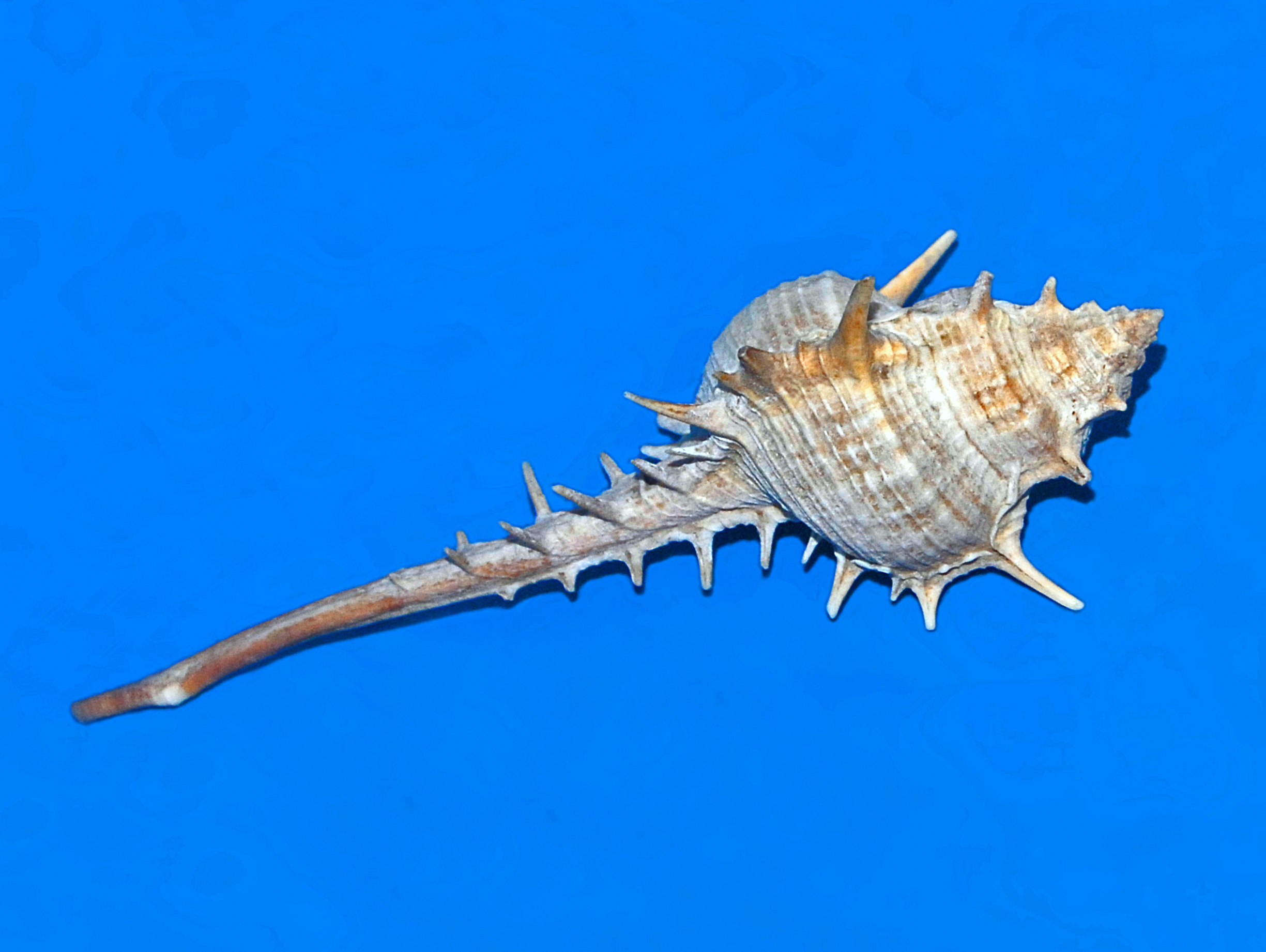
A shell of Murex trapa from Mauritius, on display at the Museo Civico di Storia Naturale di Milano

== Description ==
Shells of Murex trapa can reach a length of 50–124 millimetres (2.0–4.9 in), with a diameter of 8–21 millimetres (0.31–0.83 in).

These moderately large shells are fusiforms or club-shaped, with height and acute spire and prominent spiral ridges. Shell surface is normally light brown or blue-gray with some yellowish-brown on spines. The body whorl shows three spiny varices. The aperture is lenticular, with a white interior margin and deep red-brown within. The outer apertural lip is crenulated. The siphonal canal is straight and moderately long (about 13–47 mm). Three to four short spines are restricted to the basal half of siphonal canal.

== Biology ==
The rare-spined murex is an active predator, mainly feeding on other molluscs and barnacles.

== Bibliography ==
- Cornelis Swennen, Robert Moolenbeek, N. Ruttanadakul - Molluscs of the Southern Gulf of Thailand
- F. Pinn - Sea Snails of Pondicherry
- G.E.Radwin - Murex Shells of the World: An Illustrated Guide to the Muricidae
- Houart R. (2014). Living Muricidae of the world. Muricinae. Murex, Promurex, Haustellum, Bolinus, Vokesimurex and Siratus. Harxheim: ConchBooks. 197 pp.
- Hsi-Jen Tao - Shells of Taiwan Illustrated in Colour
- Ngoc-Thach Nguyên - Shells of Vietnam
- R. Raviche lvan, T. Anandaraj and S. Ramu LENGTH –WEIGHT RELATIONSHIP of Murex trapa and Meretrix meretrix FROM MUTHUPET COASTAL WATERS IN TAMILNADU, INDIA.
- R. Tucker Abbot - Seashells of South East Asia
- Ng, T. (2015). Hong Kong Checklist of Marine Species.
