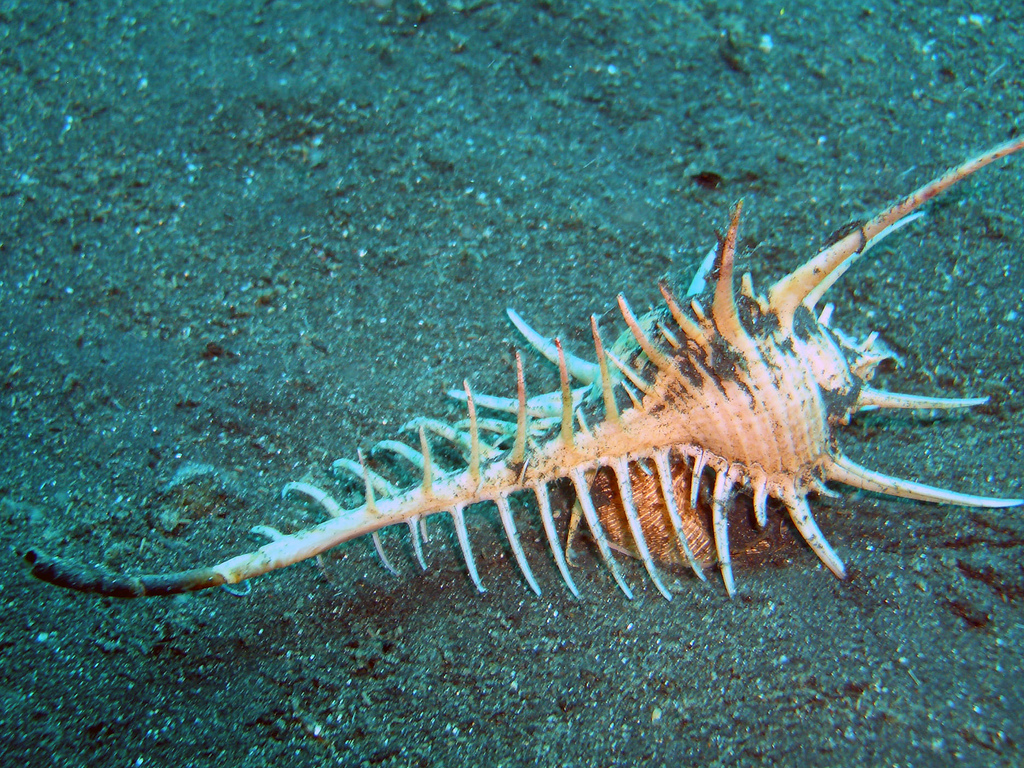
- A live Murex pecten in situ

Scientific classification
- Kingdom: Animalia
- Phylum: Mollusca
- Class: Gastropoda
- Subclass: Caenogastropoda
- Order: Neogastropoda
- Family: Muricidae
- Genus: Murex
- Species: M. pecten

Binomial name
- Murex pecten Lightfoot, 1786

= Venus comb murex =

Species of mollusc, Murex pecten

The Venus comb murex, scientific name Murex pecten, is a species of large predatory sea snail, a marine gastropod mollusk in the family Muricidae, the rock snails or murex snails. The shell of this Indo-Pacific species has a very long siphonal canal and numerous spines.

== Distribution ==
This species is native to Indo-Pacific waters.Typically, Murex pecten populations are found throughout East Africa to Australia. In East Africa, they are usually found on islands such as Madagascar and the Mascarene islands. Murex pecten are also seen in Queensland, Australia. This species is also found on neighboring islands of Australia; which include eastern Melanesia and New Caledonia.

== Habitat ==
Murex pecten inhabit areas with a large presence of coral reefs. This species is commonly seen in sandy or muddy bottoms located nearby coral reefs. They are found in three distinct coastal marine zones: littoral, sublittoral and offshore. The maximum depth they are found at is 340 metres (1,120 ft) below sea level; although they are most commonly found in more shallow waters.

== Shell description ==
The shell of this snail has an extremely long siphonal canal.

The shell has over one hundred spines, which provide protection from predation and prevent the snail from sinking in the soft mud. Like many other Murex snails, it feeds on other mollusks.

This is a common species, but perfect specimens of the shell are not easily found because of the fragility of the numerous long spines. The species grows to between 10 and 15 centimetres (3.9–5.9 in) in length.

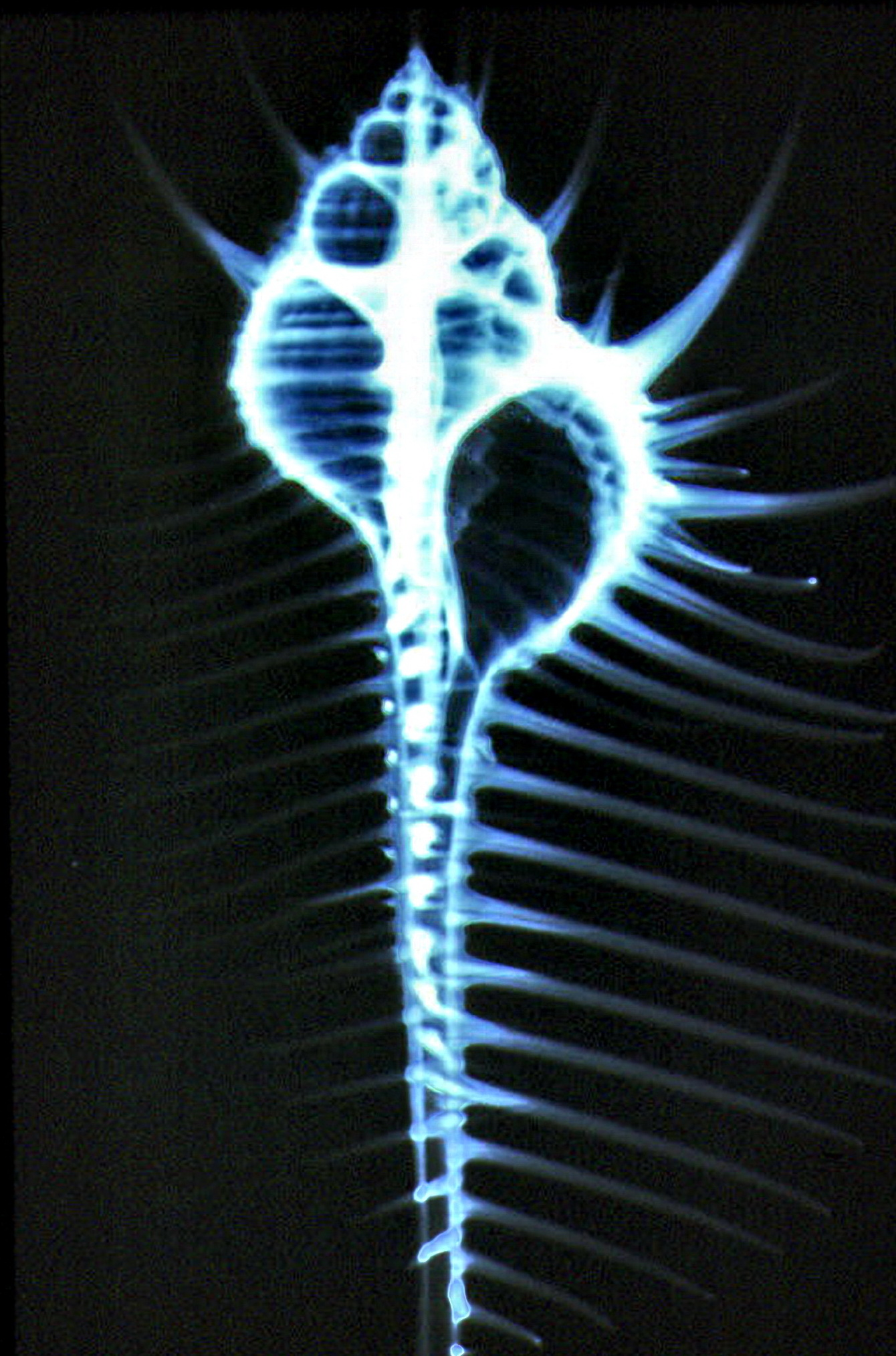
X-ray image of the shell of Murex pecten, anterior end downwards.

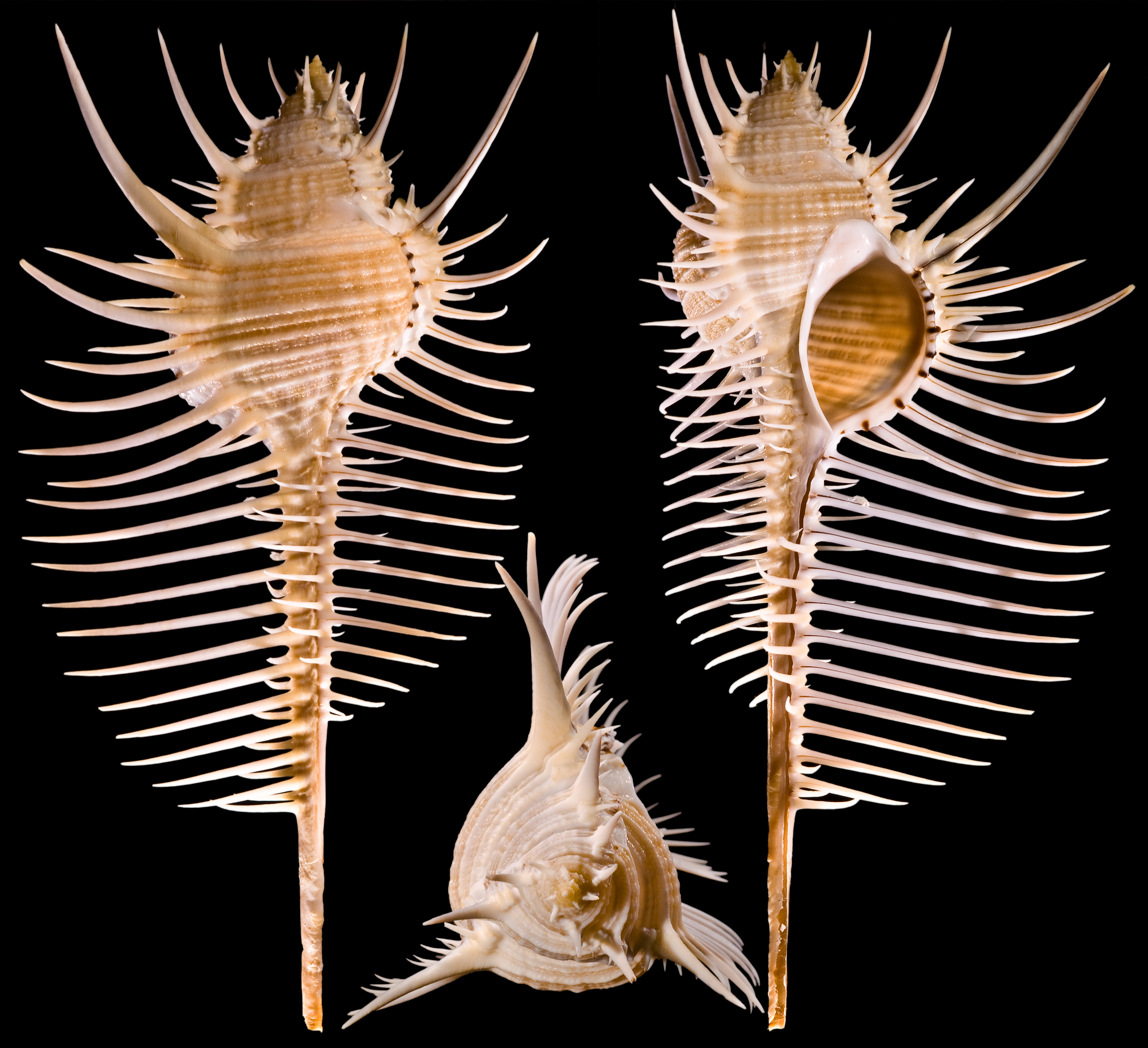
Posterior and side views of a shell that is 15 cm (5.9 in) long
