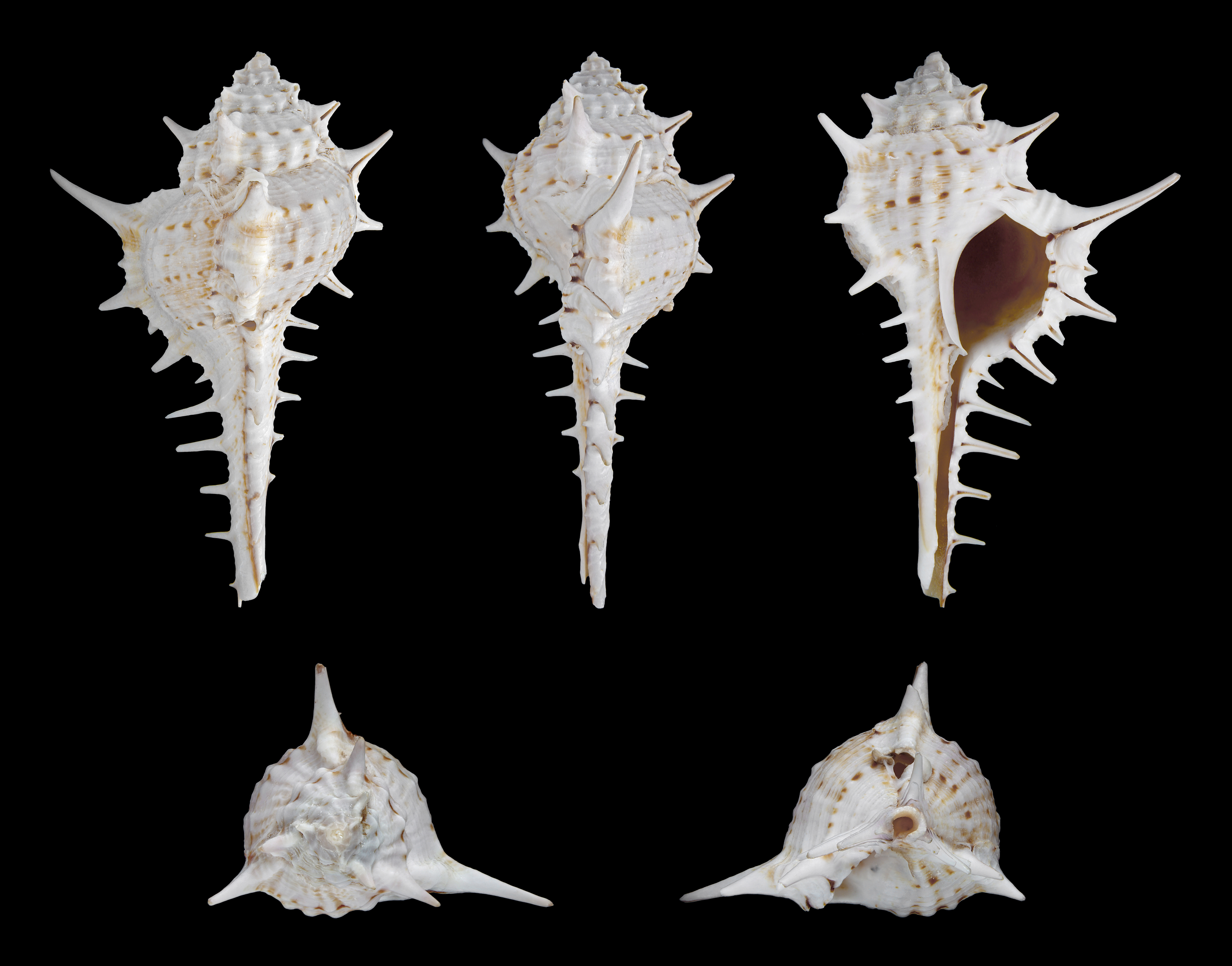

Scientific classification
- Kingdom: Animalia
- Phylum: Mollusca
- Class: Gastropoda
- Subclass: Caenogastropoda
- Order: Neogastropoda
- Family: Muricidae
- Subfamily: Muricinae
- Genus: Murex
- Species: M. carbonnieri

Binomial name
- Murex carbonnieri (Jousseaume, 1881)
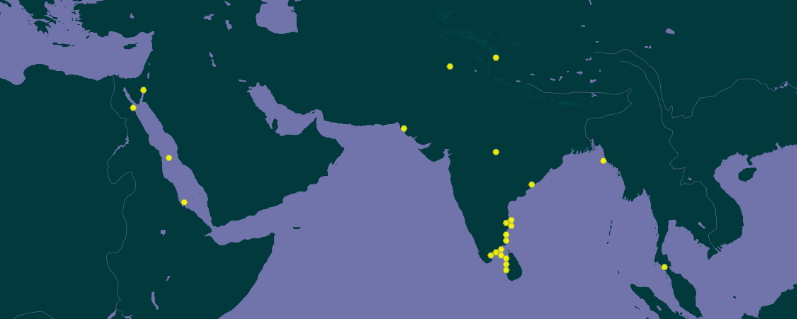

Synonyms
- Acupurpura carbonnieri Jousseaume, 1881 (original combination); Murex (Murex) carbonnieri (Jousseaume, 1881)· accepted, alternate representation; Murex maculatus A. H. Verrill, 1950 (invalid: junior homonym of Murex maculatus Reeve, 1845)

= Murex carbonnieri =

Species of gastropod

Murex carbonnieri, also known as Carbonnier's murex, is a species of large predatory sea snail, a marine gastropod mollusc in the family Muricidae, the rock snails or murex snails.

== Description ==
The length of the shell varies between 60 mm and 125 mm.

== Distribution ==
This species origin is in the Red Sea, the Gulf of Aden and the United Arab Emirates; also off Pakistan, India, Bangladesh, Sri Lanka and the Philippines and Thailand; off Ethiopia and Eritrea.
