= Coralliophila aedonia =

Scientific classification
- Kingdom: Animalia
- Phylum: Mollusca
- Class: Gastropoda
- Subclass: Caenogastropoda
- Order: Neogastropoda
- Family: Muricidae
- Genus: Coralliophila
- Species: C. aedonia

Binomial name
- Coralliophila aedonia (Watson, 1885)

Synonyms
- Murex (Pseudomurex) aëdonius Watson, 1886; ?Coralliophila profundicola Haas, 1949

Species of gastropod

Coralliophila aedonia is a species of sea snail, a marine gastropod mollusk in the family Muricidae, the murex snails or rock snails.

The World Register of Marine Species (WoRMS) states that the subgenus Murex (Pseudomurex) has been brought into synonymy with Pseudomurex Monterosato, 1872, leaving the status of Murex (Pseudomurex) aedonius unchanged. The genus Pseudomurex in turn has been brought into synonymy with Coralliophila H. Adams & A. Adams, 1853 by M. Oliverio in 2008. This genus contains the species Coralliophila (Pseudomurex) aedonia. Therefore, there is good reason to believe that both species are synonyms.

== Distribution ==
This marine species occurs in the South Atlantic off Nightingale Island; Brazil and off the Azores at depths between 280–1180 m.
