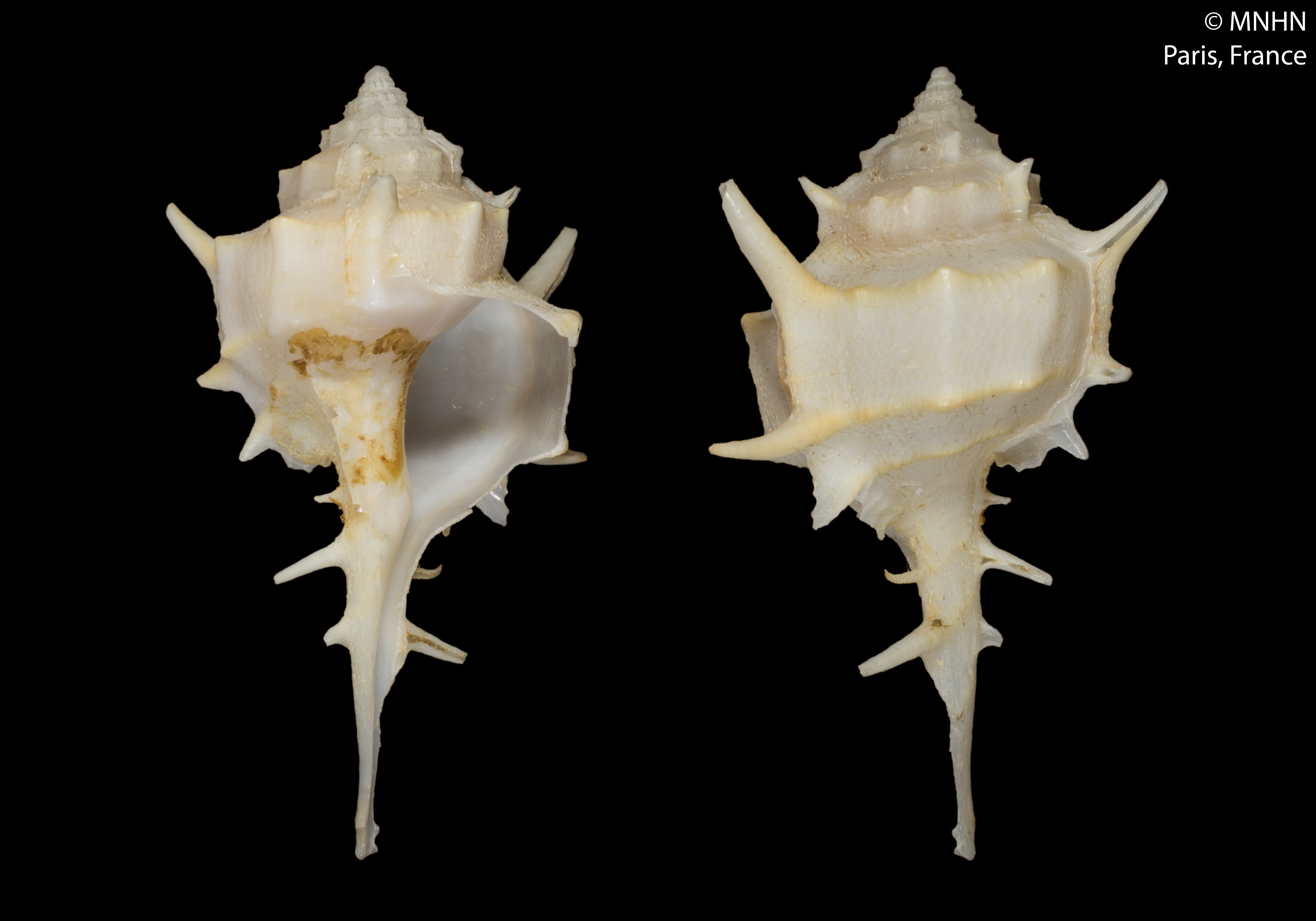
- Shell of Murex protocrassus (paratype at MNHN, Paris)

Scientific classification
- Kingdom: Animalia
- Phylum: Mollusca
- Class: Gastropoda
- Subclass: Caenogastropoda
- Order: Neogastropoda
- Family: Muricidae
- Genus: Murex
- Species: M. protocrassus

Binomial name
- Murex protocrassus Houart, 1990

Synonyms
- Murex (Promurex) protocrassus Houart, 1990

= Murex protocrassus =

Murex (Promurex) protocrassus

Species of gastropod

Murex protocrassus is a species of sea snail, a marine gastropod mollusk in the family Muricidae, the murex snails or rock snails.

== Distribution ==
This marine species occurs off New Caledonia.
