= Murex antelmei =

Scientific classification
- Kingdom: Animalia
- Phylum: Mollusca
- Class: Gastropoda
- Subclass: Caenogastropoda
- Order: Neogastropoda
- Family: Muricidae
- Genus: Murex
- Species: M. antelmei

Binomial name
- Murex antelmei Viader, 1938

Synonyms
- Murex (Promurex) antelmei Viader, 1938· accepted, alternate representation

Species of gastropod

Murex antelmei is a species of large predatory sea snail, a marine gastropod mollusk in the family Muricidae, the rock snails or murex snails.
