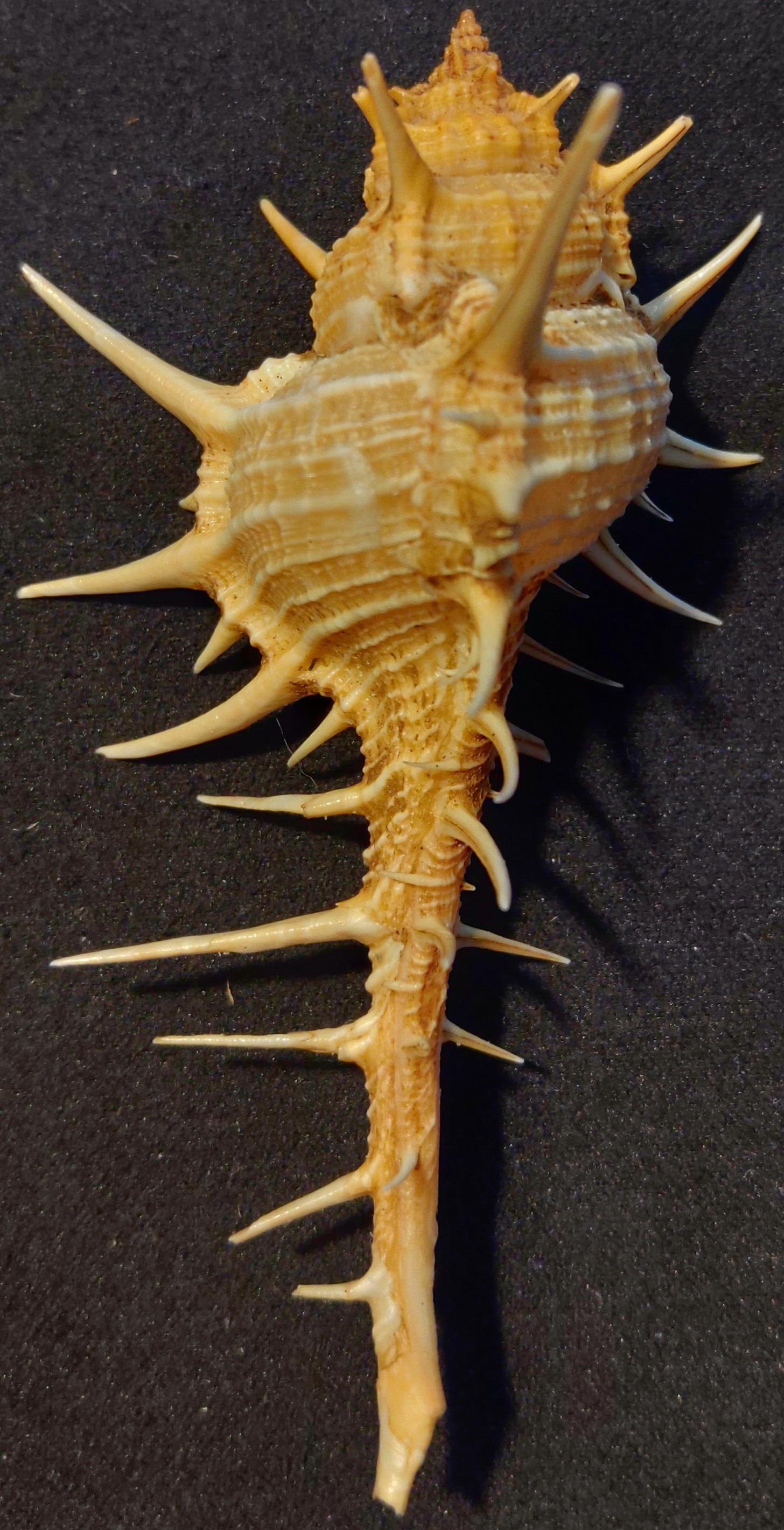

Scientific classification
- Kingdom: Animalia
- Phylum: Mollusca
- Class: Gastropoda
- Subclass: Caenogastropoda
- Order: Neogastropoda
- Family: Muricidae
- Genus: Murex
- Species: M. africanus

Binomial name
- Murex africanus Ponder & E. H. Vokes, 1988

Synonyms
- Murex (Murex) africanus Ponder & Vokes, 1988· accepted, alternate representation; Murex (Murex) tenuirostrum africanus Ponder & Vokes, 1988 (basionym); Murex tenuirostrum africanus Ponder & E. H. Vokes, 1988

= Murex africanus =

Species of gastropod

Murex africanus is a species of large predatory sea snail, a marine gastropod mollusk in the family Muricidae, the rock snails or murex snails.
