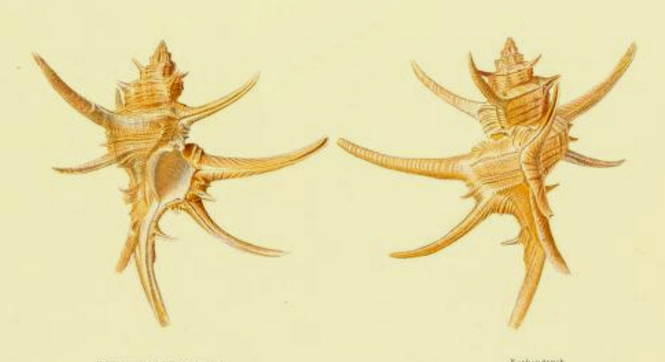
- Original image of a shell of Chicoreus longicornis

Scientific classification
- Kingdom: Animalia
- Phylum: Mollusca
- Class: Gastropoda
- Subclass: Caenogastropoda
- Order: Neogastropoda
- Family: Muricidae
- Genus: Chicoreus
- Species: C. longicornis

Binomial name
- Chicoreus longicornis (Dunker, 1864)

Synonyms
- Chicoreus (Triplex) longicornis (Dunker, 1864) · accepted, alternate representation; Chicoreus recticornis (Martens in Lobbecke & Kobelt, 1880); Murex longicornis Dunker, 1864; Murex recticornis Martens in Lobbecke & Kobelt, 1880; Poirieria kurranulla Garrard, 1961

= Chicoreus longicornis =

Species of gastropod

Chicoreus longicornis is a species of sea snail, a marine gastropod mollusk in the family Muricidae, the murex snails or rock snails.

== Description ==
The length of the shell varies between 30 mm and 75 mm. The shell has a tan color, with stripes of a much darker hue of the same tan. The shell also has many hollow, protruding "hornlike" spikes, that can sometimes resemble the antlers of a deer. The color does vary uniquely between specimens, and can be a much darker or lighter shade of tan. It is structurally characterized by having three spinose axial vertices per whorl.

== Distribution ==
This marine species occurs in the Indo-West Pacific and off Australia (Queensland)
