= Vangueriella spinosa =

Scientific classification
- Kingdom: Plantae
- Clade: Tracheophytes
- Clade: Angiosperms
- Clade: Eudicots
- Clade: Asterids
- Order: Gentianales
- Family: Rubiaceae
- Genus: Vangueriella
- Species: V. spinosa

Binomial name
- Vangueriella spinosa (Schumach. & Thonn.) Verdc.

Synonyms
- Canthium stenosepalum Lantz; Canthium thonningii Benth.; Chomelia leucodermis K.Krause; Phallaria spinosa Schumach. & Thonn.; Plectronia klotzschiana K.Schum.; Plectronia spinosa (Schumach. & Thonn.) K.Schum.; Vangueriopsis leucodermis (K.Krause) Hutch. & Dalziel; Vangueriopsis membranacea Robyns; Vangueriopsis spinosa (Schumach. & Thonn.) Hepper; Vangueriopsis violacea Robyns

Species of plant

Vangueriella spinosa is a species of flowering plant in the family Rubiaceae. It is found in western Tropical Africa.
