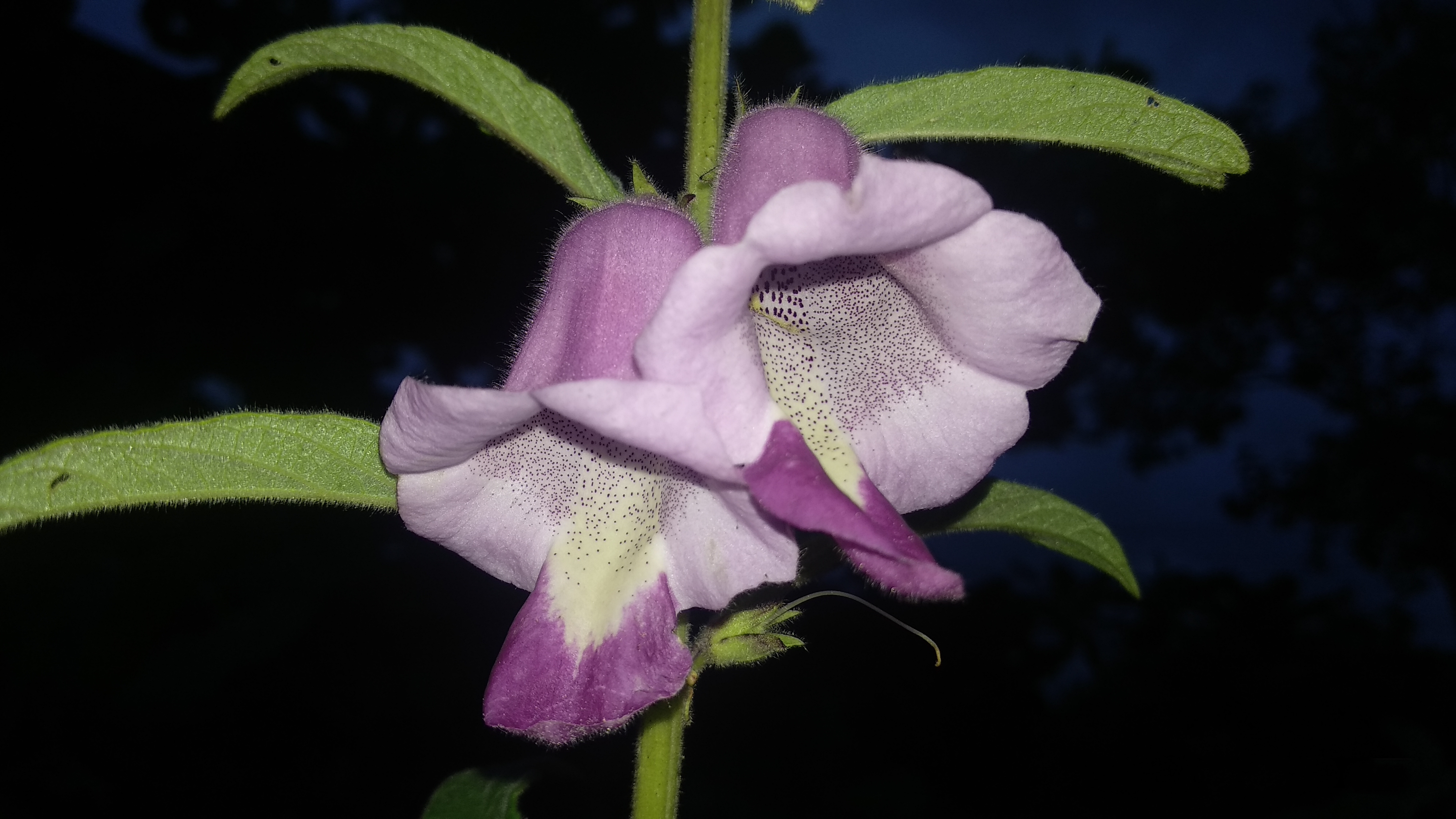
- Benniseed flowers

Scientific classification
- Kingdom: Plantae
- Clade: Tracheophytes
- Clade: Angiosperms
- Clade: Eudicots
- Clade: Asterids
- Order: Lamiales
- Family: Pedaliaceae
- Genus: Sesamum
- Species: S. radiatum

Binomial name
- Sesamum radiatum Schumach. and Thonn.

Synonyms
- Sesamopteris radiata (Schumach. & Thonn.) DC. ex Meisn.

= Sesamum radiatum =

Species of flowering plant

Sesamum radiatum is a species of flowering plant in the Pedaliaceae. It is in the same genus as sesame, and is known by the English common names benniseed, black benniseed, black sesame, and vegetable sesame. (While the regular sesame, Sesamum indicum, may have black seeds, also referred to as black sesame, and is a related plant, it is a separate species from Sesamum radiatum.) It is native to west and central Africa, has been cultivated since ancient times in Africa, and is sometimes also used in tropical Asia where it has become naturalized to a small extent.

== Etymology ==
Benniseed is a portmanteau of both the word benne and seed. Benne, meaning sesame derives from Gullah benne which is akin to Malinke bĕne.

== Use ==
=== Culinary ===
The seeds are eaten whole, made into a paste, ground into a powder, or pressed for a high-quality oil. The leaves can be eaten fresh or cooked and are used in Sub-Saharan Africa as a leaf vegetable. The leaves are mucilaginous in texture when cooked. The shoots can also be eaten and are used in soups and porridge.

=== Medicinally ===
The leaves are also used medicinally as a laxative, an antidote to scorpion venom and to treat sprains and ease childbirth. The stem and bark have also been noted for their anti-bacterial properties.

== Cultivation ==
This plant is an annual herb growing up to 1.2 to 1.5 metres (3 ft 11 in to 4 ft 11 in) tall. The leaves are opposite, or toward the top of the plant, alternately arranged. The leaves are lance-shaped to oval and up to 12 centimetres (5 in) long. They may be smooth-edged or serrated. Flowers occur singly in the leaf axils. They are pink to purple in color, sometimes white, and somewhat bell-shaped. They measure up to 5 centimetres (2 in) long. The fruit is a capsule up to 3.5 centimetres (1 3/8 in) long which contains seeds roughly 3 millimetres (15/128 in) long.

This plant grows wild in savanna and other habitat types. It is also a weed of fields and homesteads. It can grow on poor, rocky soils and it flowers even through drought conditions. When cultivated the plant yields 5 to 6 metric tons (5.5 to 6.6 short tons) of leaves per hectare.

This plant is vulnerable to the leaf spot disease Cercospora sesami. It is also attacked by hawk moths (Sphingidae), the moth Antigastra catalaunalis, and the vegetable bug Nezara viridula.
