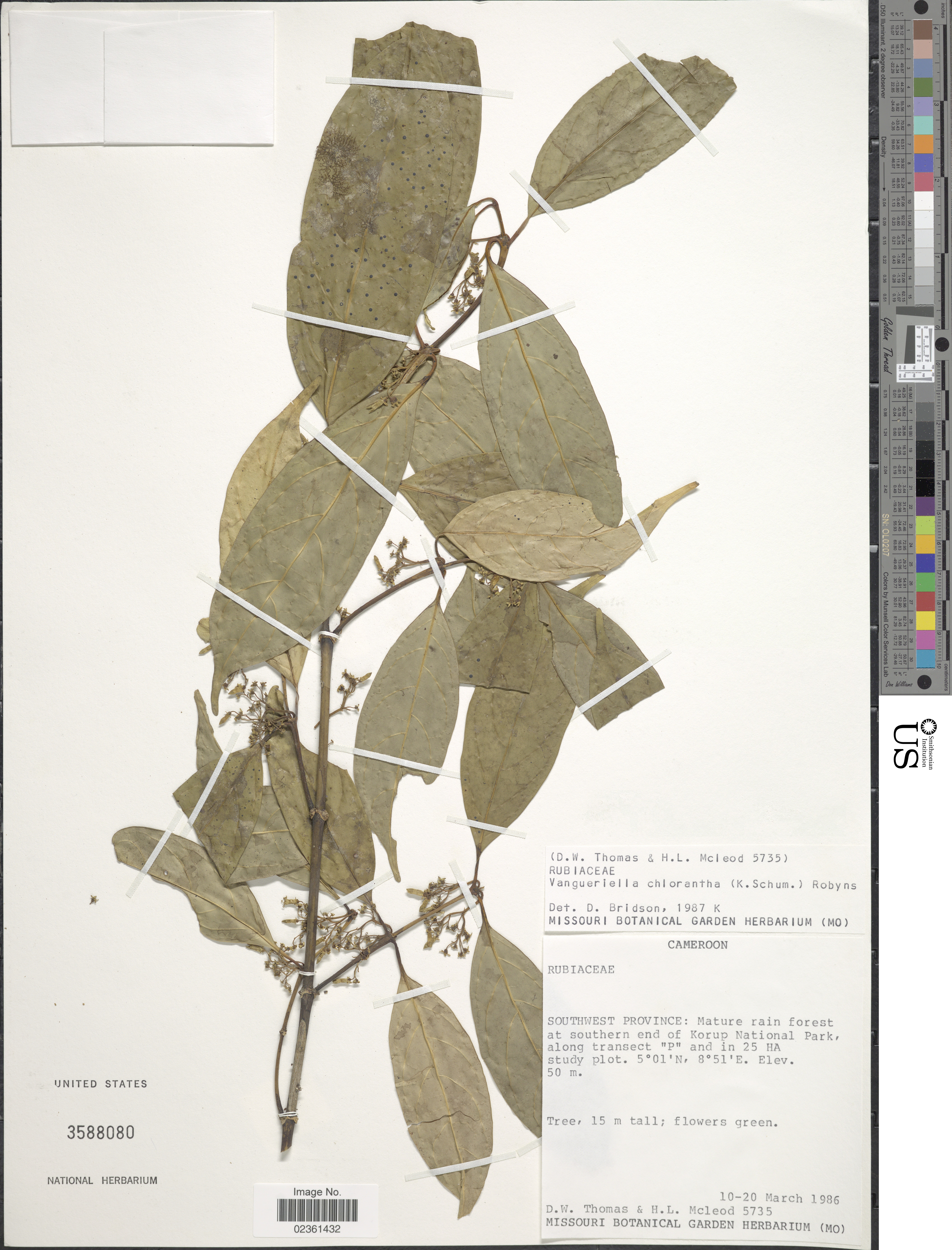
- Vangueriella chlorantha

Scientific classification
- Kingdom: Plantae
- Clade: Tracheophytes
- Clade: Angiosperms
- Clade: Eudicots
- Clade: Asterids
- Order: Gentianales
- Family: Rubiaceae
- Subfamily: Dialypetalanthoideae
- Tribe: Vanguerieae
- Genus: Vangueriella; Verdc.

Type species
- Vangueriella laxiflora (K.Schum.) Verdc.

= Vangueriella =

Genus of flowering plants

Vangueriella is a genus of flowering plants in the family Rubiaceae. The genus is found in tropical Africa.

== Taxonomy ==
It was originally described in 1987 by Bernard Verdcourt who transferred species from the Vangueriopsis subgenus Brachyanthus to the newly erected genus. The genus has two sections, V. sect. Vangueriella and V. sect. Stenosepalae, with the type species Vangueriella laxiflora and Vangueriella spinosa respectively. No changes to the taxonomy have been made since then.

== Species ==
Vangueriella section Vangueriella

- Vangueriella chlorantha (K.Schum.) Verdc.
- Vangueriella discolor (Benth.) Verdc.
- Vangueriella laxiflora (K.Schum.) Verdc.
- Vangueriella letestui Verdc.
- Vangueriella nigerica (Robyns) Verdc.
- Vangueriella nigricans (Robyns) Verdc.
- Vangueriella olacifolia (Robyns) Verdc.
- Vangueriella vanguerioides (Hiern) Verdc.
- Vangueriella zenkeri Verdc.

Vangueriella section Stenosepalae

- Vangueriella campylacantha (Mildbr.) Verdc.
- Vangueriella georgesii Verdc.
- Vangueriella glabrescens (Robyns) Verdc.
- Vangueriella orthacantha (Mildbr.) Bridson & Verdc.
- Vangueriella rhamnoides (Hiern) Verdc.
- Vangueriella rufa (Robyns) Verdc.
- Vangueriella sapinii (De Wild.) Verdc.
- Vangueriella soyauxii (K.Schum.) Verdc.
- Vangueriella spinosa (Schumach. & Thonn.) Verdc.
