= Phyllanthus polyspermus =

Scientific classification
- Kingdom: Plantae
- Clade: Tracheophytes
- Clade: Angiosperms
- Clade: Eudicots
- Clade: Rosids
- Order: Malpighiales
- Family: Phyllanthaceae
- Genus: Phyllanthus
- Species: P. polyspermus

Binomial name
- Phyllanthus polyspermus (Poir.) Schumach. & Thonn.

Synonyms
- Phyllanthus reticulatus var. orae-solis Kirganelia zanzibariensis Baill.

Species of flowering plant

Phyllanthus polyspermus is a bush species first described Jean Louis Marie Poiret, with its current name after Schumacher and Thonning; it is included in the family Phyllanthaceae. No subspecies are listed in the Catalogue of Life.

Note: this species is frequently misidentified as P. reticulatus (which occurs in Asia and was introduced to Jamaica).
