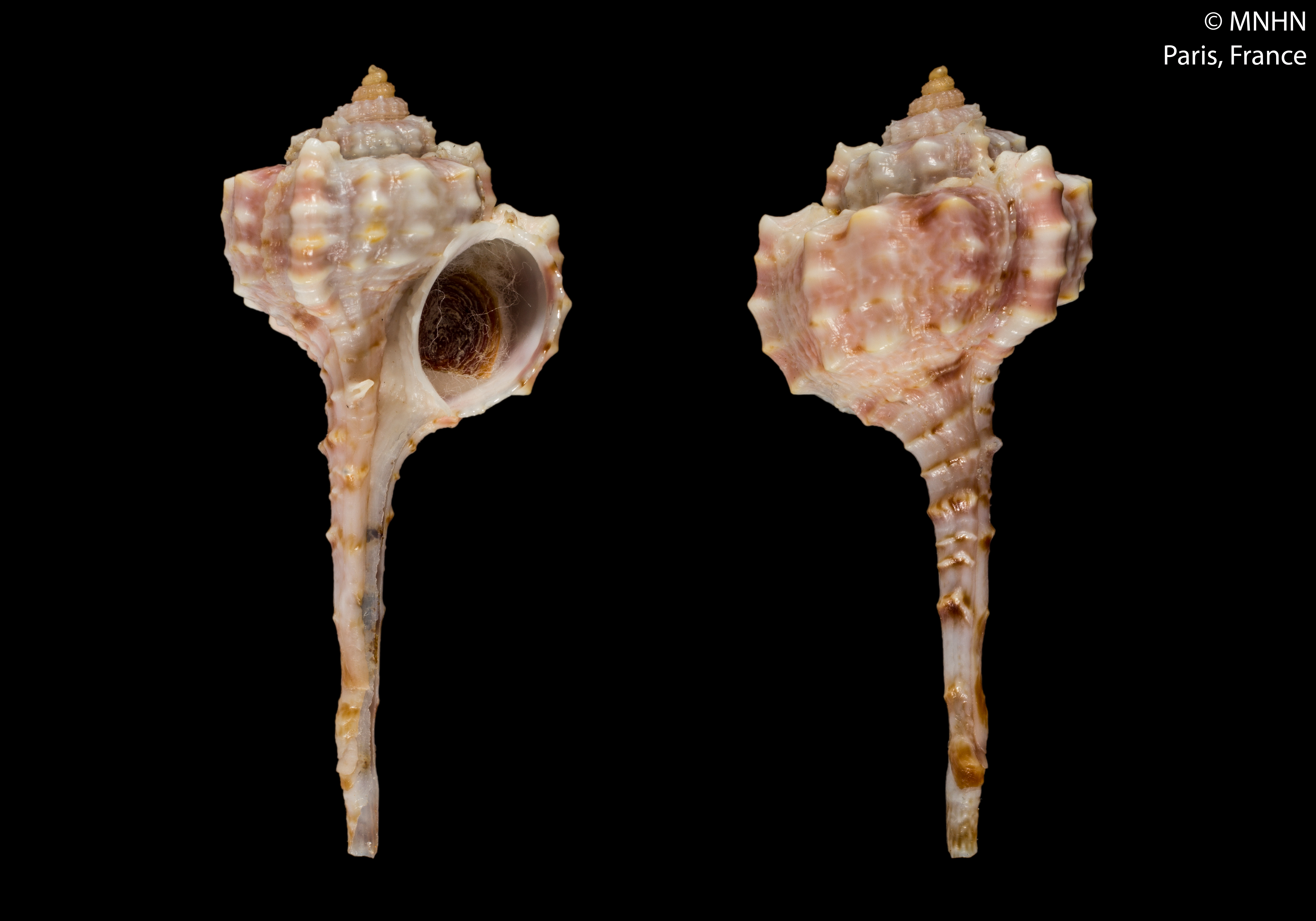
- Shell of Haustellum bengalense (holotype at MNHN, Paris)

Scientific classification
- Kingdom: Animalia
- Phylum: Mollusca
- Class: Gastropoda
- Subclass: Caenogastropoda
- Order: Neogastropoda
- Family: Muricidae
- Subfamily: Muricinae
- Genus: Haustellum; Schumacher, 1817

Type species
- Murex haustellum Linnaeus, 1758

Synonyms
- Brontes Montfort, 1810; Brontesia Reichenbach, 1828; Haustellaria Swainson, 1833; Murex (Haustellum)

= Haustellum =

Genus of gastropods

Haustellum is a genus of medium-sized sea snails, marine gastropod mollusks in the family Muricidae, the murex snails or rock snails. Like many other genera within the Muricidae, the genus has been redefined several times.

Ponder & Vokes (1988) and Vokes (1990) included American and Indo-Pacific species in Haustellum, which differs from Murex sensu stricto by lacking a labral spine.

Petuch (1994) introduced Vokesimurex for the American long-canalled Haustellum sensu Vokes (1990), such as Murex messorius Sowerby, 1841.

Houart (1999) transferred 14 Indo-Pacific species and three subspecies of Haustellum in the genus Vokesimurex.

As currently defined, Haustellum is represented by eight to nine species. Members of Haustellum generally differ from those of Vokesimurex in having a globose and low-spired shape, a more rounded aperture, a smooth columella, a less deep anal notch, and no cord spine.

== Species ==
Species within the genus Haustellum include:

- Haustellum barbieri Houart, 1993
- Haustellum bengalense Bozzetti, 2016
- Haustellum bondarevi Houart, 1999
- Haustellum damarcoi Briano & Damarco, 2011
- Haustellum fallax (E. A. Smith, 1901)
- Haustellum franchii Bozzetti, 1993
- Haustellum haustellum (Linnaeus, 1758)
- Haustellum kurodai Shikama, 1964
- Haustellum langleitae Houart, 1993
- Haustellum longicaudum (F. C. Baker, 1891)
- Haustellum lorenzi Houart, 2013
- Haustellum tweedianum (Macpherson, 1962):
- Haustellum vicdani Kosuge, 1980
- Haustellum wilsoni D'Attilio & Old, 1971

Species brought into synonymy

- Haustellum bellegladeensis (E. H. Vokes, 1963) : synonym of Vokesimurex bellegladeensis (E. H. Vokes, 1963)
- Haustellum bengalensis Bozzetti, 2016 : synonym of Haustellum bengalense Bozzetti, 2016 (wrong gender agreement of specific epithet)
- Haustellum bobyini (Kosuge, 1983): synonym of Vokesimurex bobyini (Kosuge, 1983)
- Haustellum brandaris (Linnaeus, 1758) is a synonym for Bolinus brandaris (Linnaeus, 1758)
- Haustellum clavatum Schumacher, 1817: synonym of Bolinus brandaris (Linnaeus, 1758)
- Haustellum danilai Houart, 1992: synonym of Vokesimurex danilai (Houart, 1992)
- Haustellum dentifer (Watson, 1883): synonym of Vokesimurex dentifer dentifer (Watson, 1883)
- Haustellum dolichourus Ponder & Vokes, 1988: synonym of Vokesimurex dolichourus (Ponder & Vokes, 1988)
- Haustellum elenense (Dall, 1909): synonym of Vokesimurex elenensis (Dall, 1909)
- Haustellum gallinago (G.B. Sowerby III, 1903): synonym of Vokesimurex gallinago (G.B. Sowerby III, 1903)
- Haustellum hirasei (Hirase, 1915): synonym of Vokesimurex hirasei (Hirase, 1915)
- Haustellum kiiensis (Kira, 1959): synonym of Vokesimurex kiiensis (Kira, 1959)
- Haustellum laeve Schumacher, 1817: synonym of Haustellum haustellum (Linnaeus, 1758)
- Haustellum malabaricum (E. A. Smith, 1894): synonym of Vokesimurex malabaricus (E. A. Smith, 1894)
- Haustellum mindanaoensis (G.B. Sowerby II, 1841): synonym of Vokesimurex mindanaoensis (G.B. Sowerby II, 1841)
- Haustellum multiplicatus (Sowerby, 1895): synonym of Vokesimurex multiplicatus (Sowerby, 1895)
- Haustellum nobile Schumacher, 1817: synonym of Murex pecten pecten Lightfoot, 1786
- Haustellum purdyae (Radwin & D'Attilio, 1976): synonym of Vokesimurex purdyae (Radwin & D'Attilio, 1976)
- Haustellum rectirostris (Sowerby, 1841): synonym of Vokesimurex rectirostris (Sowerby, 1841)
- Haustellum sobrinus (A. Adams, 1863): synonym of Vokesimurex sobrinus (A. Adams, 1863)

== Paleontology ==
There is no record of extinct species in the geological register. The oldest member is the type species Haustellum haustellum from the Indo-Pacific province. It is recorded from the Miocene of Borneo (Beets, 1941), the Pliocene of Java, Indonesia and the Plio-Pleistocene of the Malaysian Archipelago.
