= Benzonia =

Benzonia may refer to:

- Benzonia, Michigan, a village in the U.S. state of Michigan
- Benzonia (plant), a genus of flowering plants in the family Rubiaceae
