= Vangueriopsis shimbaensis =

Conservation status
- Critically Endangered (IUCN 3.1)

Scientific classification
- Kingdom: Plantae
- Clade: Tracheophytes
- Clade: Angiosperms
- Clade: Eudicots
- Clade: Asterids
- Order: Gentianales
- Family: Rubiaceae
- Genus: Vangueriopsis
- Species: V. shimbaensis

Binomial name
- Vangueriopsis shimbaensis A.P.Davis & Q.Luke

Species of plant

Vangueriopsis shimbaensis is a species of flowering plants in the family Rubiaceae. It is endemic to Kenya. It is morphologically related to Vangueriopsis longiflora from Tanzania.
