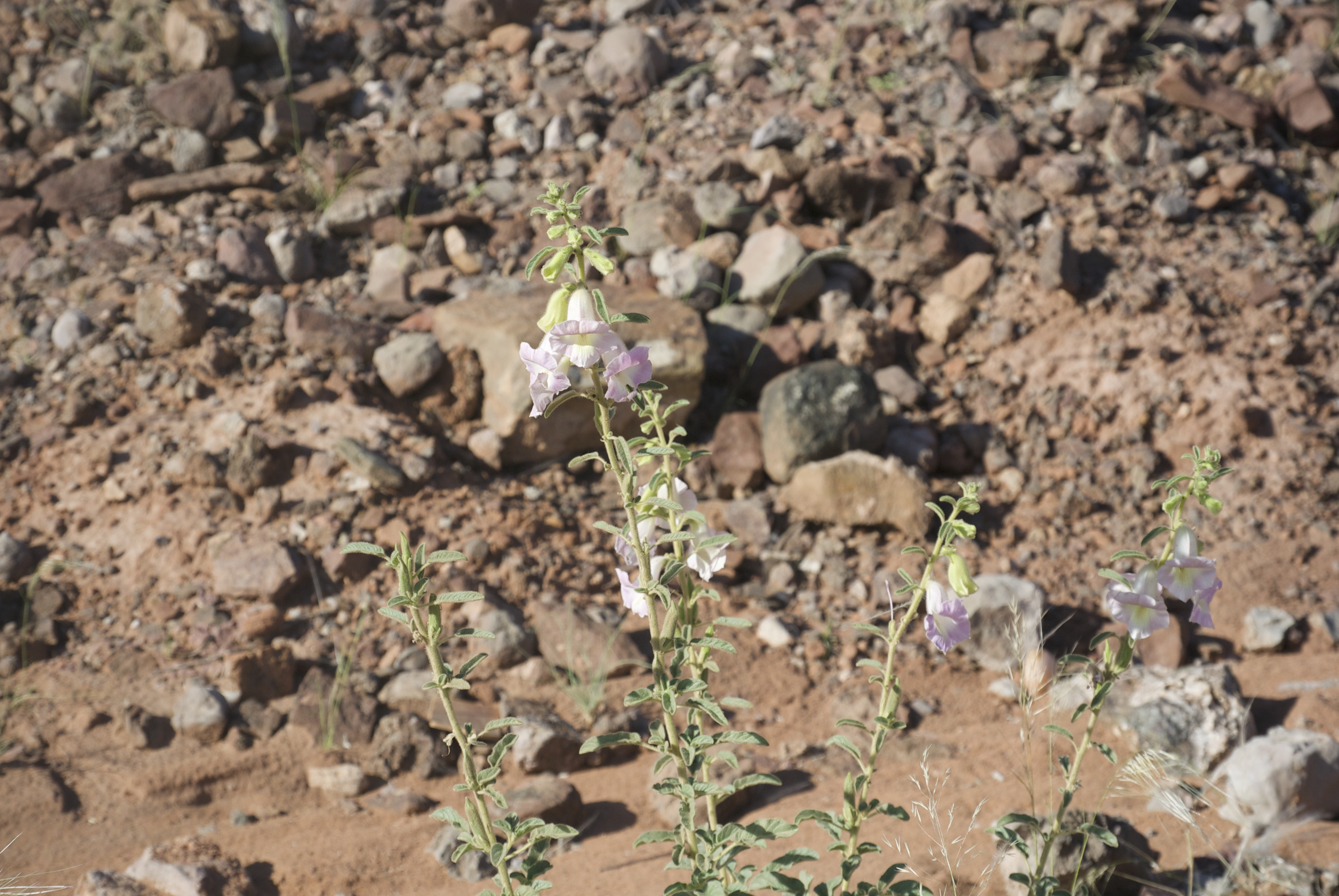

Scientific classification
- Kingdom: Plantae
- Clade: Tracheophytes
- Clade: Angiosperms
- Clade: Eudicots
- Clade: Asterids
- Order: Lamiales
- Family: Pedaliaceae
- Genus: Sesamum
- Species: S. marlothii

Binomial name
- Sesamum marlothii Engl.

Synonyms
- Sesamum dinteri Schinz

= Sesamum marlothii =

Species of flowering plant

Sesamum marlothii is a species of flowering plant in the same genus as sesame. It is native to western South Africa. It was originally described as similar to S. schinzianum but differing in various ways, including having the lower leaves with three parts, shorter stalks of the flowers and fruit, capsules half the size, and somewhat larger seeds.
