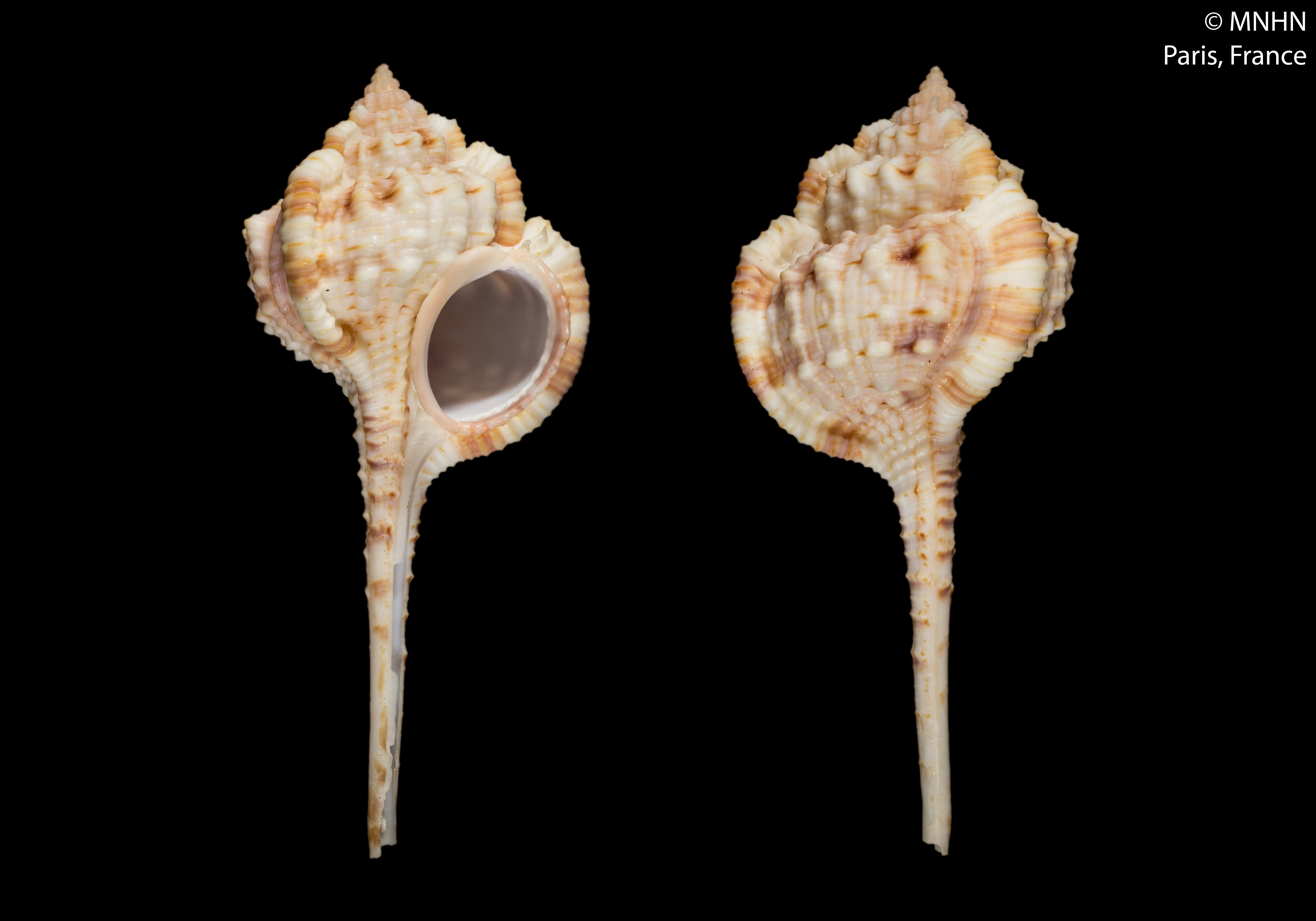
- Shell of Haustellum bondarevi (holotype at MNHN, Paris)

Scientific classification
- Kingdom: Animalia
- Phylum: Mollusca
- Class: Gastropoda
- Subclass: Caenogastropoda
- Order: Neogastropoda
- Family: Muricidae
- Genus: Haustellum
- Species: H. bondarevi

Binomial name
- Haustellum bondarevi Houart, 1999

= Haustellum bondarevi =

Species of gastropod

Haustellum bondarevi is a species of sea snail, a marine gastropod mollusc in the family Muricidae, the murex snails or rock snails.

== Distribution ==
This marine species occurs off Saya de Malha Bank (northeast of Madagascar) in the Indian Ocean.
