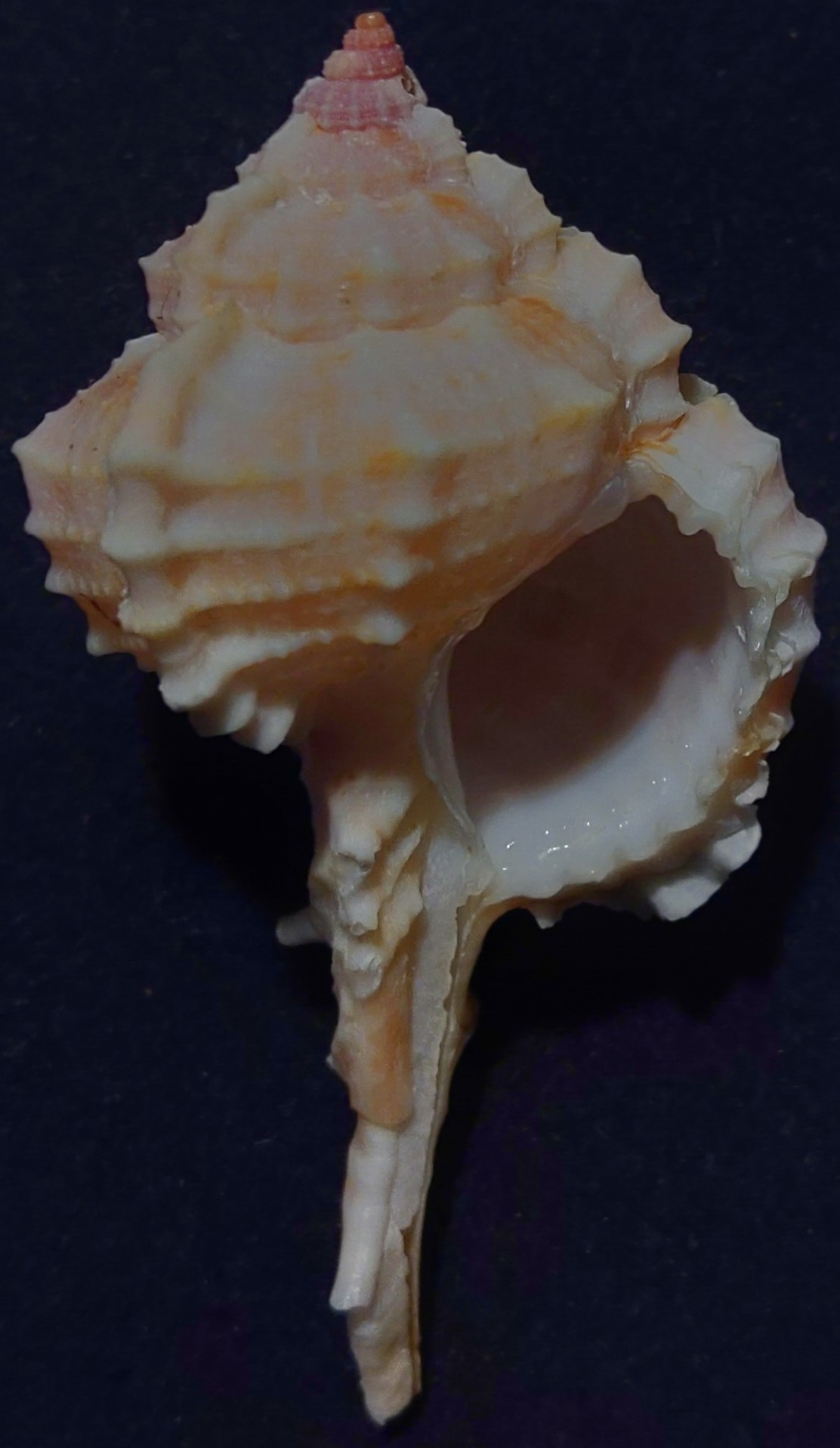

Scientific classification
- Kingdom: Animalia
- Phylum: Mollusca
- Class: Gastropoda
- Subclass: Caenogastropoda
- Order: Neogastropoda
- Family: Muricidae
- Genus: Haustellum
- Species: H. tweedianum

Binomial name
- Haustellum tweedianum (Macpherson, 1962)

Synonyms
- Murex espinosus Macpherson, 1959; Murex tweedianus Macpherson, 1962 (basionym); Vokesimurex tweedianus (Macpherson, 1962)

= Haustellum tweedianum =

Species of gastropod

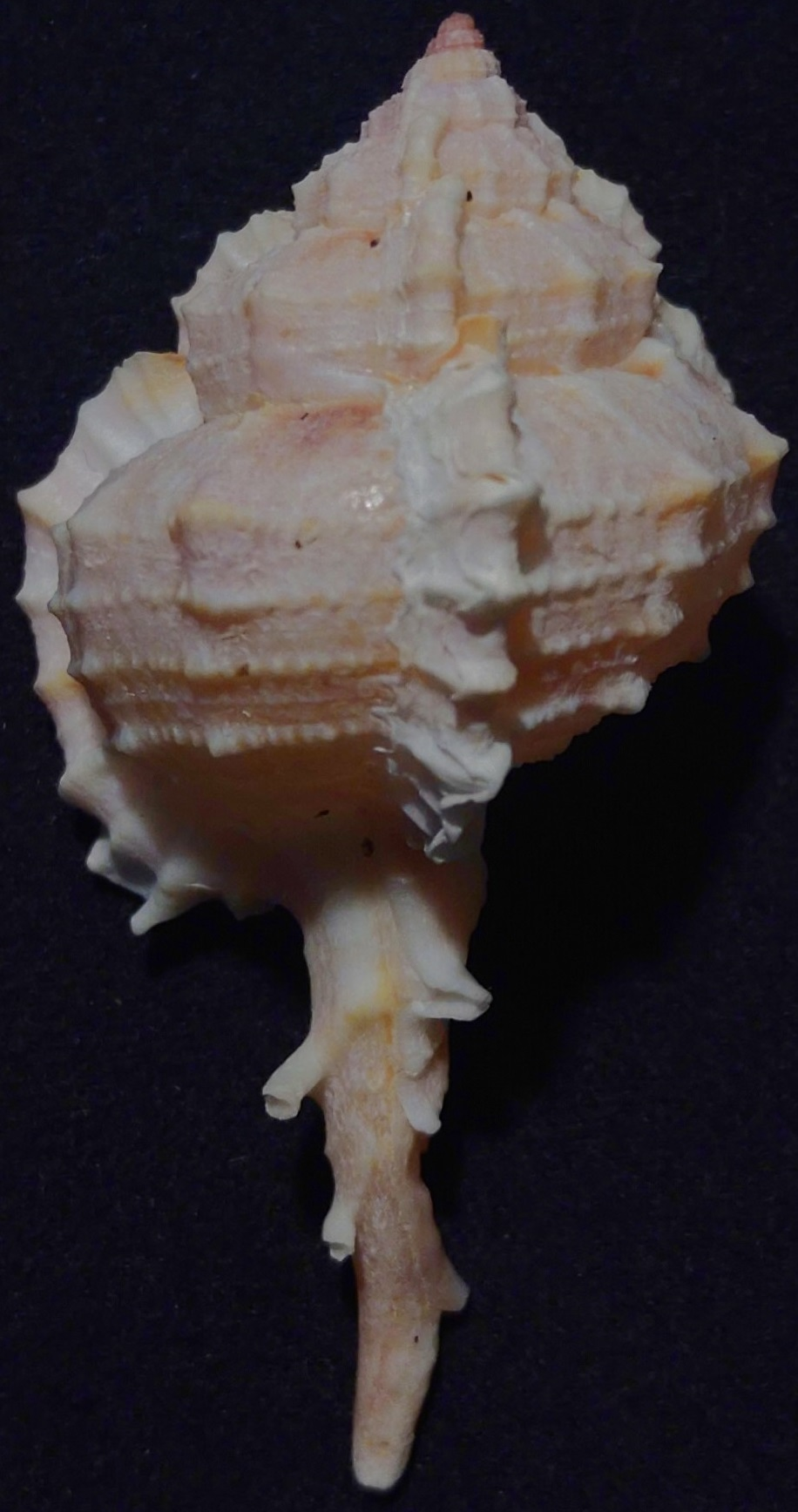

Haustellum tweedianum, the Tweed murex, is a species of sea snail, a marine gastropod mollusc in the family Muricidae, the murex snails or rock snails. They have sexual reproduction.

== Description ==
Medium shell, creamy white to brown, sometimes tinged with pink and ornamented with brown blotches. Three prominent, rounded varicies per whorl, usually spineless, but occasionally with one or two sharp spines at the base of the varicies and anteriorly on the canal. Sculptured with gemmate, spiral striae which are occasionally yellowish. Aperture white, outer lip sharply, minutely dentate. The shell of an adult specimen varies between 50 mm and 80 mm.

== Distribution ==
This marine species can be found off South Queensland and New South Wales, Australia.
