= Haustellum longicaudum =

Scientific classification
- Kingdom: Animalia
- Phylum: Mollusca
- Class: Gastropoda
- Subclass: Caenogastropoda
- Order: Neogastropoda
- Family: Muricidae
- Genus: Haustellum
- Species: H. longicaudum

Binomial name
- Haustellum longicaudum (F. C. Baker, 1891)

Synonyms
- Murex haustellum var. longicaudus F. C. Baker, 1891

Species of gastropod

Haustellum longicaudum is a species of sea snail, a marine gastropod mollusc in the family Muricidae, the murex snails or rock snails.
