= Haustellum wilsoni =

Scientific classification
- Kingdom: Animalia
- Phylum: Mollusca
- Class: Gastropoda
- Subclass: Caenogastropoda
- Order: Neogastropoda
- Family: Muricidae
- Genus: Haustellum
- Species: H. wilsoni

Binomial name
- Haustellum wilsoni D'Attilio & Old, 1971

Species of gastropod

Haustellum wilsoni is a species of sea snail, a marine gastropod mollusc in the family Muricidae, the murex snails or rock snails.
