= Benzonia corymbosa =

Scientific classification
- Kingdom: Plantae
- Clade: Tracheophytes
- Clade: Angiosperms
- Clade: Eudicots
- Clade: Asterids
- Order: Gentianales
- Family: Rubiaceae
- Genus: Benzonia; Schumach.
- Species: B. corymbosa

Binomial name
- Benzonia corymbosa Schumach.

Species of flowering plant

Benzonia corymbosa is a species of flowering plants in the family Rubiaceae, endemic to Guinea in West Africa. It is the only species in the genus Benzonia. It was described by Heinrich Christian Friedrich Schumacher in 1827.
