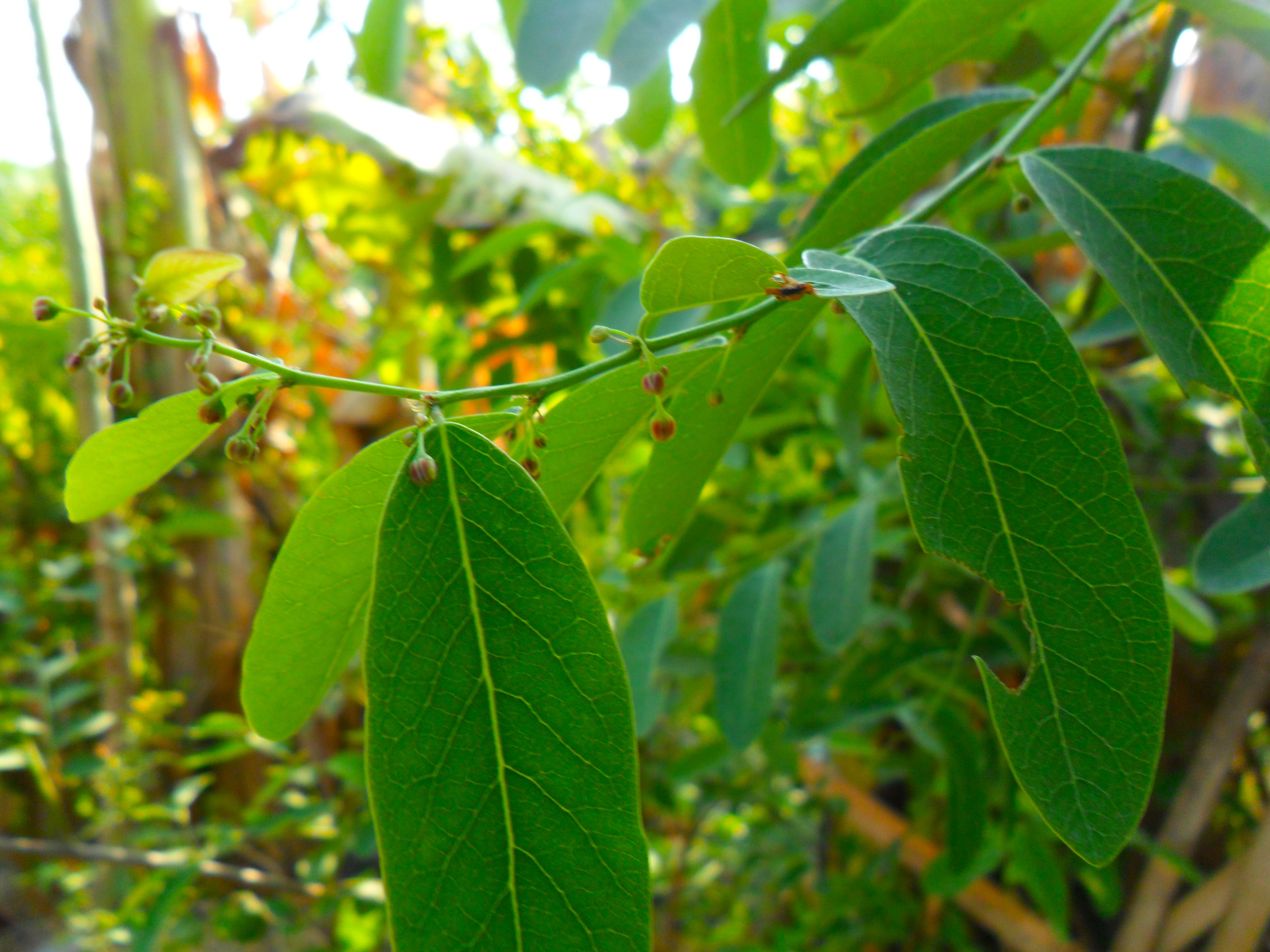
- Leaves and flowers
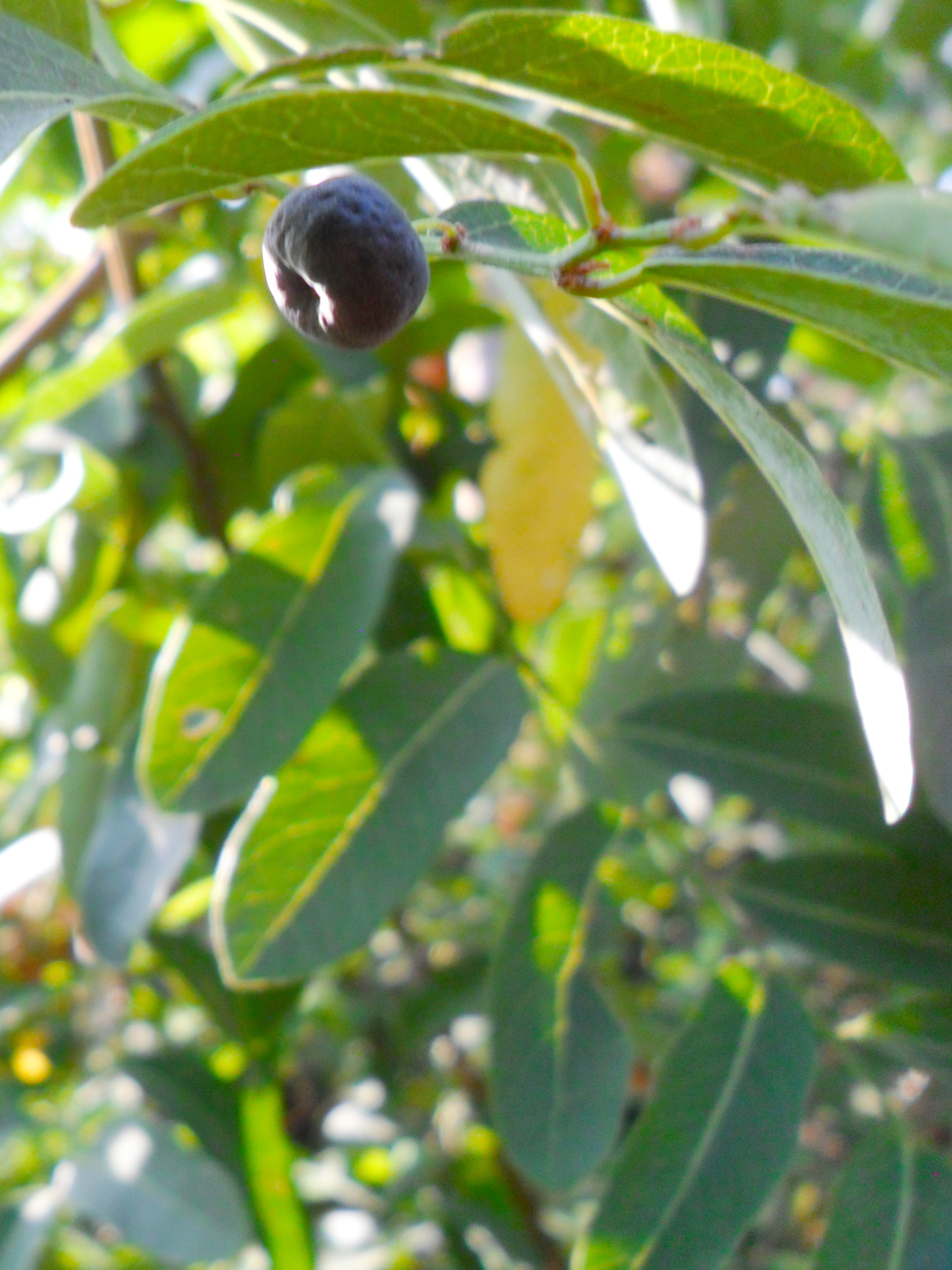
- Fruit

Conservation status
- Least Concern (IUCN 3.1)

Scientific classification
- Kingdom: Plantae
- Clade: Embryophytes
- Clade: Tracheophytes
- Clade: Angiosperms
- Clade: Eudicots
- Clade: Rosids
- Order: Malpighiales
- Family: Phyllanthaceae
- Genus: Phyllanthus
- Species: P. reticulatus

Binomial name
- Phyllanthus reticulatus Poir.

Synonyms
- List: Anisonema dubium Blume; Anisonema intermedium Decne.; Anisonema jamaicense (Griseb.) Griseb.; Anisonema multiflorum (Baill.) Wight; Anisonema puberulum Baill.; Anisonema reticulatum (Poir.) A.Juss.; Anisonema wrightianum Baill.; Anisonema zollingeri Miq.; Cicca decandra Blanco; Cicca reticulata (Poir.) Kurz; Diasperus multiflorus (Baill.) Kuntze; Diasperus reticulatus (Poir.) Kuntze; Kirganelia dubia (Blume) Baill.; Kirganelia intermedia (Decne.) Baill.; Kirganelia lineata Alston; Kirganelia multiflora Baill.; Kirganelia prieuriana Baill.; Kirganelia puberula Baill.; Kirganelia reticulata (Poir.) Baill.; Kirganelia sinensis Baill.; Kirganelia wightiana Baill.; Melanthesa oblongifolia Oken; Phyllanthus alaternoides Rchb. ex Baill.; Phyllanthus chamissonis Klotzsch; Phyllanthus dalbergioides (Müll.Arg.) Wall. ex J.J.Sm.; Phyllanthus depressus Buch.-Ham. ex Dillwyn [Illegitimate]; Phyllanthus griseus Wall. [Invalid]; Phyllanthus jamaicensis Griseb.; Phyllanthus microcarpus var. dalbergioides Müll.Arg.; Phyllanthus microcarpus var. pallidus Müll.Arg.; Phyllanthus multiflorus Willd. [Illegitimate]; Phyllanthus oblongifolius Pax; Phyllanthus pentandrus Roxb. ex Thwaites [Illegitimate]; Phyllanthus prieurianus (Baill.) Müll.Arg.; Phyllanthus puberulus Miq. ex Baill.; Phyllanthus pulchellus A. Juss.; Phyllanthus reticulatus var. reticulatus; Phyllanthus scandens Roxb. ex Dillwyn; Phyllanthus spinescens Wall. [Invalid]; Phyllanthus takaoensis Hayata

= Phyllanthus reticulatus =

Species of flowering plant

Phyllanthus reticulatus is a plant species described Jean Louis Marie Poiret; it is included in the family Phyllanthaceae.

The species is native to tropical Asia, New Guinea, northern Australia, and the Solomon and Santa Cruz Islands. It has been introduced to Jamaica. It has been confused with P. polyspermus. In Vietnamese its name is phèn đen (sometimes diệp hạ châu mạng). It is also found in Northern Australia, where the aborigines of the Moyle River area use the wood for firesticks and call it mirrinymirriny.

It is also found in abundance in the Terai areas of Uttar Pradesh, India, along the banks of ponds, which is called Sikati / Sikti (सिकटी/सिक्टी) in the local language.

Phyllanthus reticulatus is pollinated by several different species of Epicephala (leafflower moths) in East Asia. The adult moths pollinate the flowers but lay eggs in the P. reticulatus flowers' ovaries, where the emerging larvae consume some of the developing seeds.

== Subspecies ==
The following subspecies are listed in the Catalogue of Life:

- Phyllanthus reticulatus var. glaber (Thwaites) Müll.Arg.
- P. r. reticulatus (see synonyms)

== Description ==
Phyllanthus reticulatus is a shrub, sometimes partially scrambling and usually only up to 5 m high, with light reddish-brown or grey-brown with hairy stems when young, which become smooth with age. For a full description see Flora of China and the gallery below.

== Gallery ==
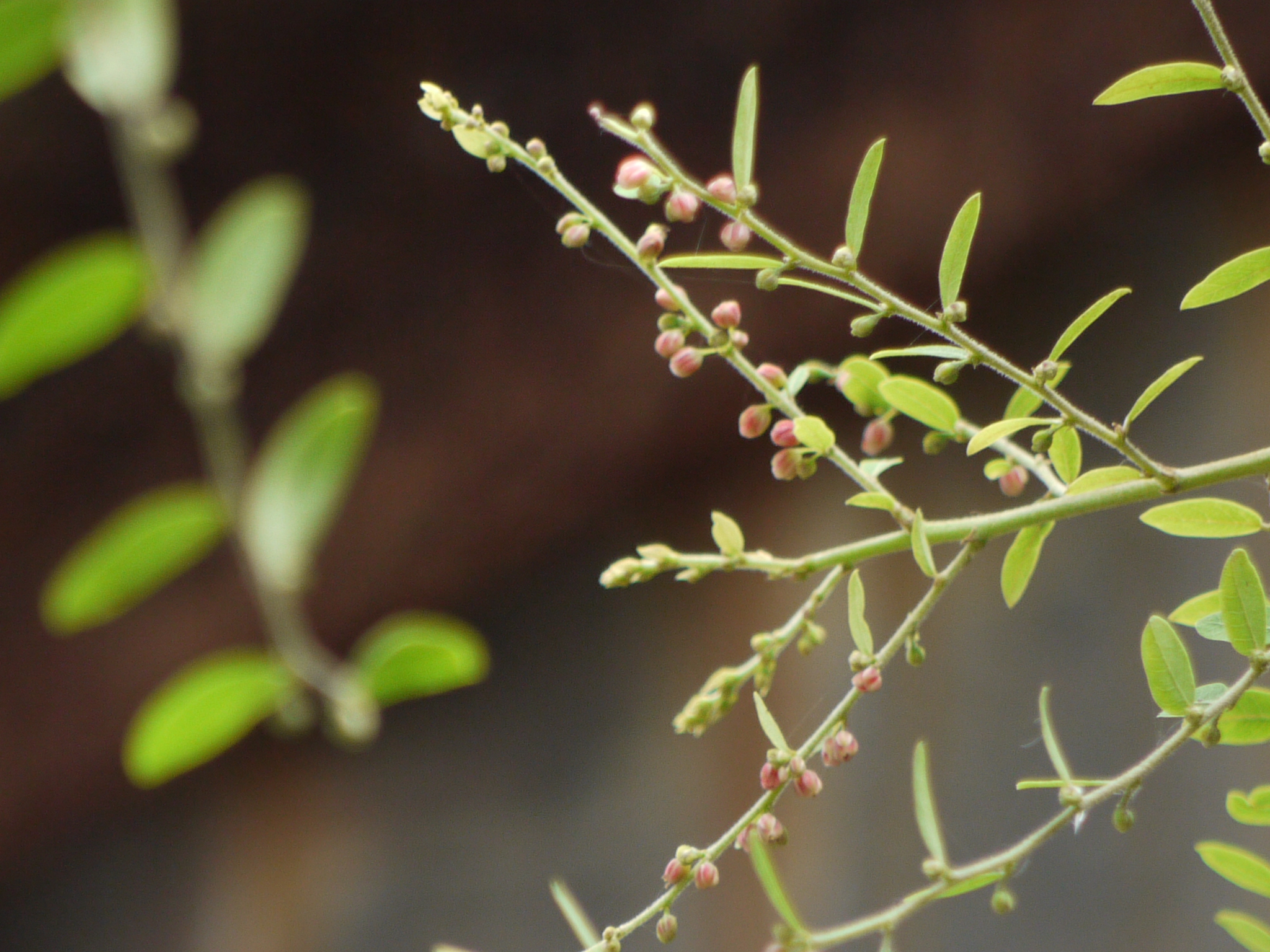

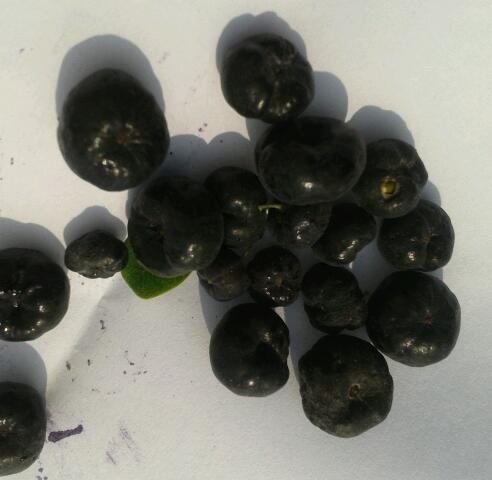
fruit

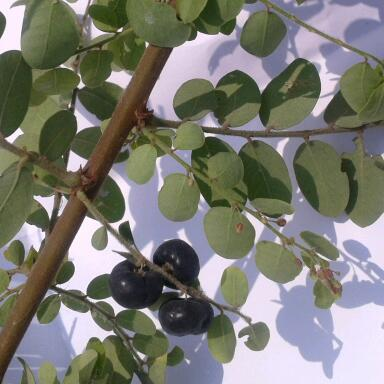

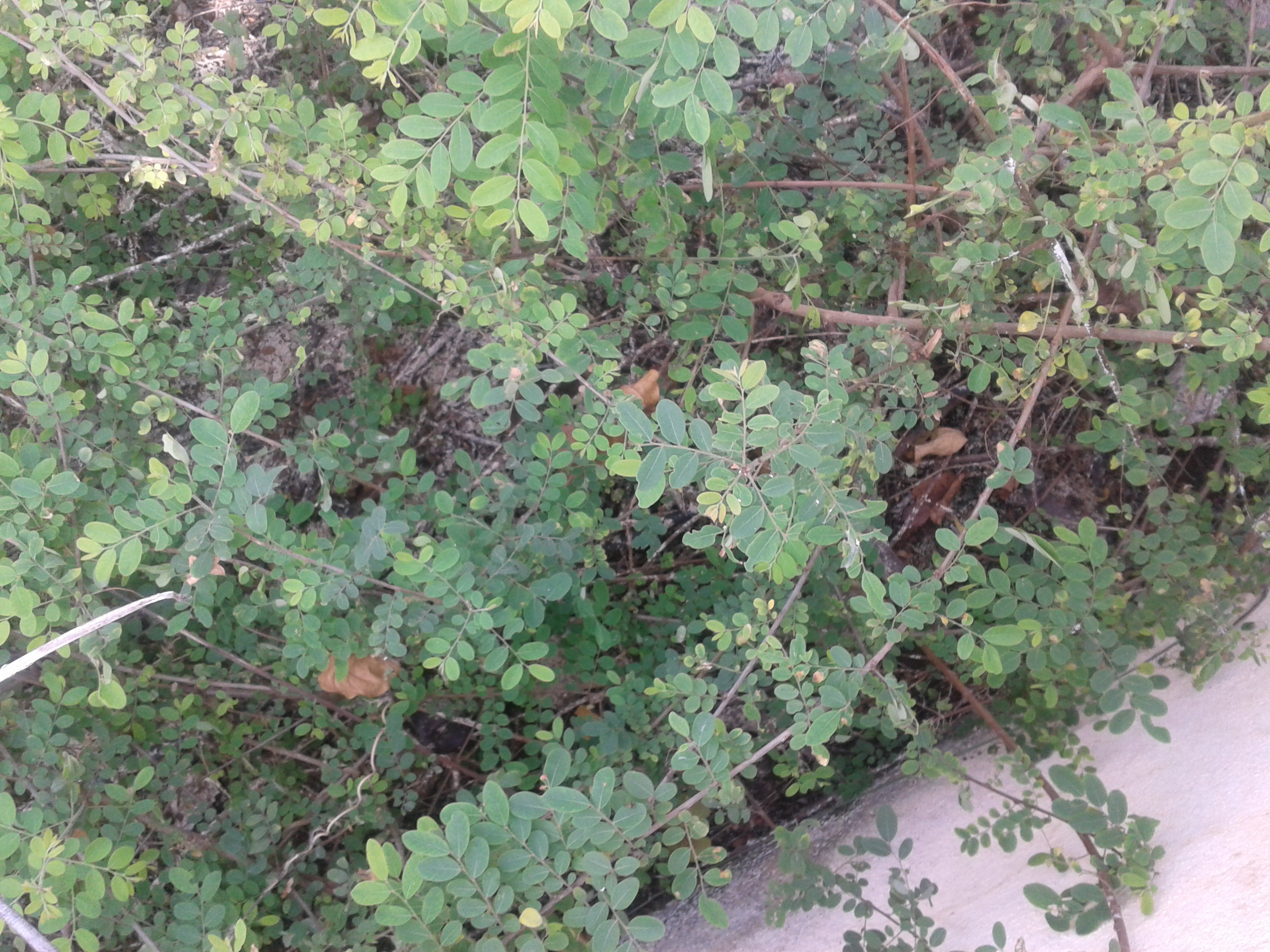
bush

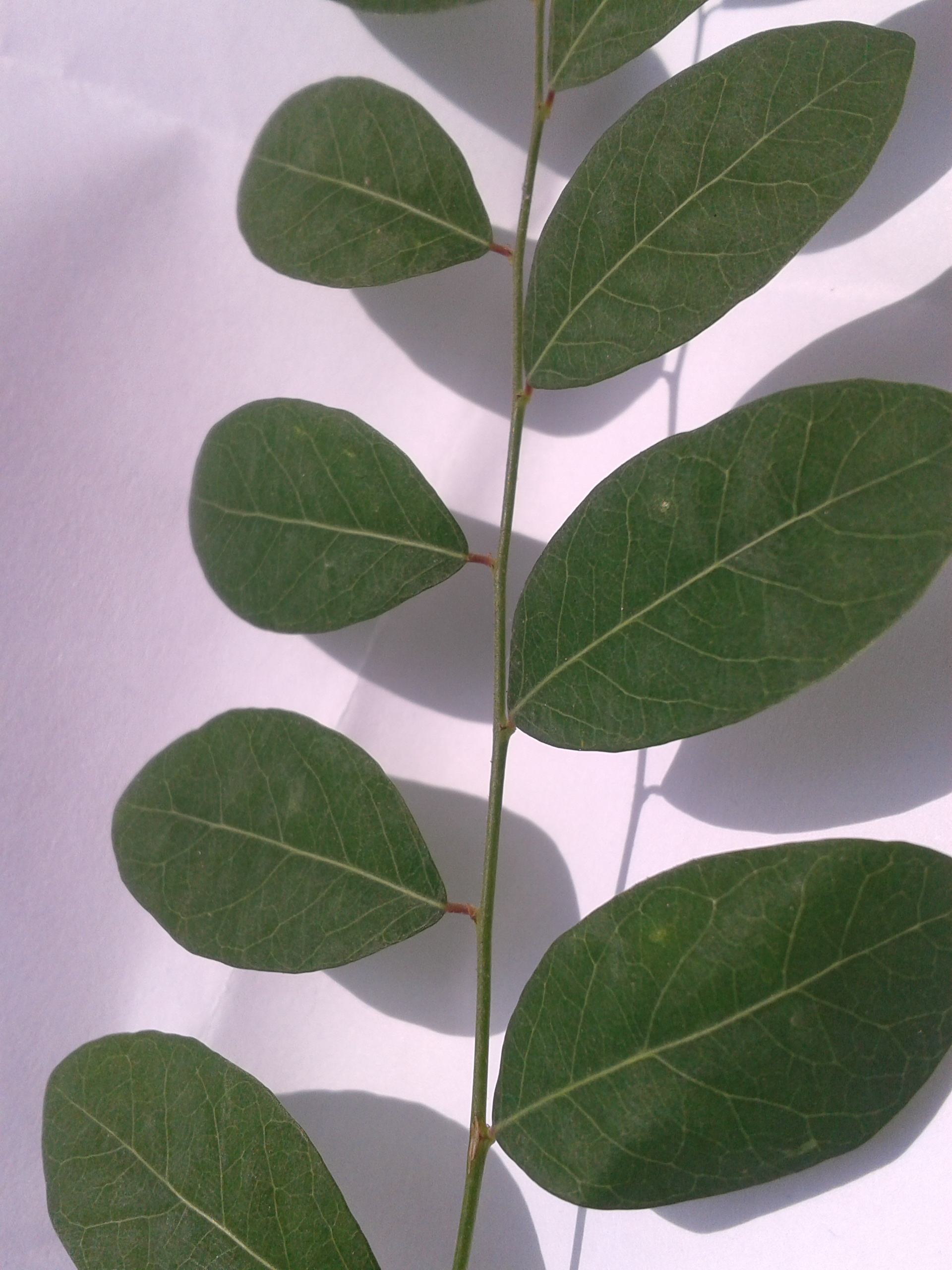
foliage

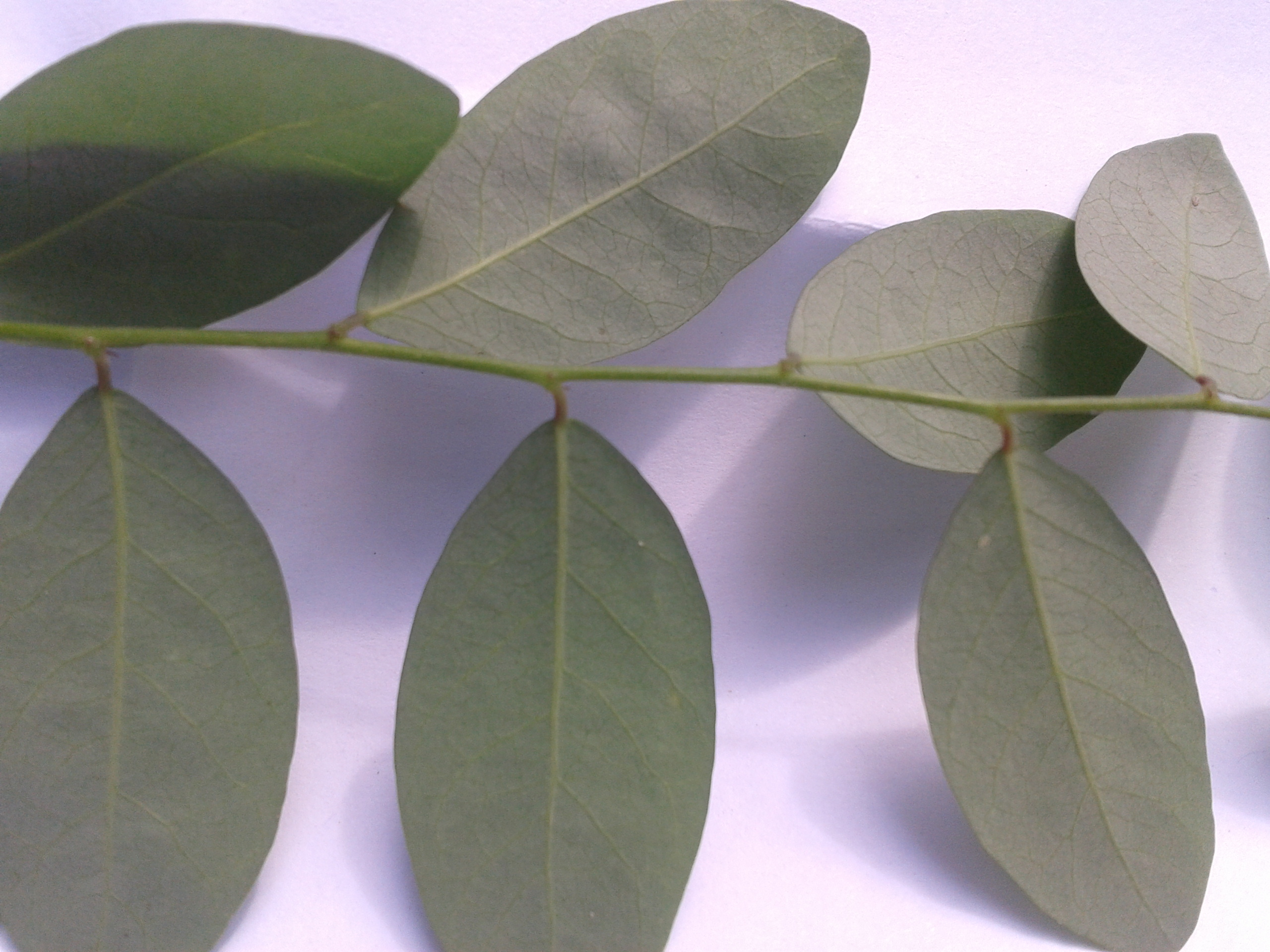

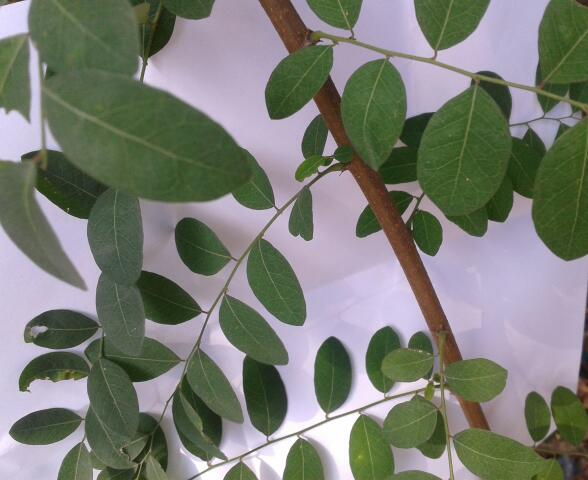

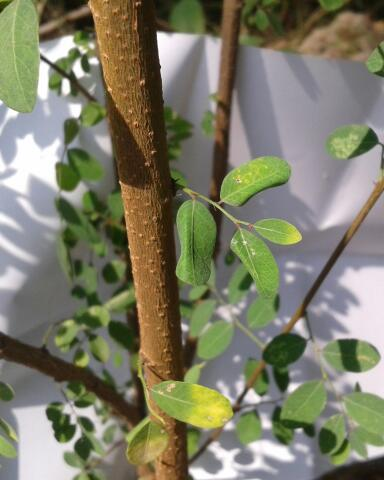
