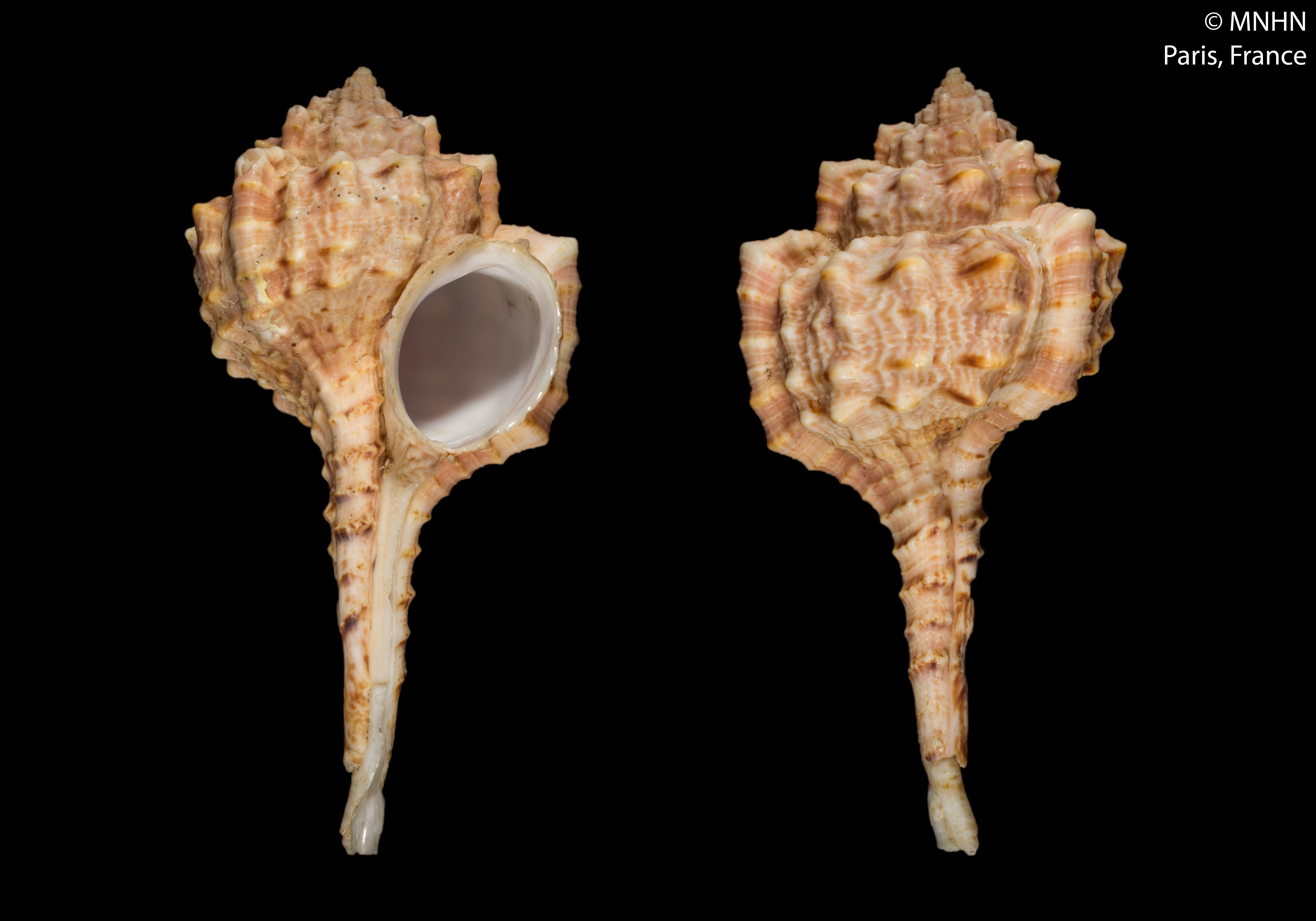

Scientific classification
- Kingdom: Animalia
- Phylum: Mollusca
- Class: Gastropoda
- Subclass: Caenogastropoda
- Order: Neogastropoda
- Family: Muricidae
- Genus: Haustellum
- Species: H. barbieri

Binomial name
- Haustellum barbieri Houart, 1993

= Haustellum barbieri =

Species of gastropod

Haustellum barbieri is a species of sea snail, a marine gastropod mollusc in the family Muricidae, the murex snails or rock snails.

== Description ==
It is a club-shaped sea snail with light color combinations variating between yellow, gray, brown on some cases, and white. It is a big sea snail, measuring over 97.6mm.

== Distribution ==
Most descriptions and reports come mainly from Madagascar.
