= Vangueriopsis rubiginosa =

Scientific classification
- Kingdom: Plantae
- Clade: Tracheophytes
- Clade: Angiosperms
- Clade: Eudicots
- Clade: Asterids
- Order: Gentianales
- Family: Rubiaceae
- Genus: Vangueriopsis
- Species: V. rubiginosa

Binomial name
- Vangueriopsis rubiginosa Robyns

Synonyms
- Vangueriopsis gossweileri Robyns

Species of flowering plant

Vangueriopsis rubiginosa is a species of flowering plants in the family Rubiaceae.

It is found in Cabinda, Cameroon, the Republic of the Congo, Equatorial Guinea, and the Democratic Republic of the Congo.
