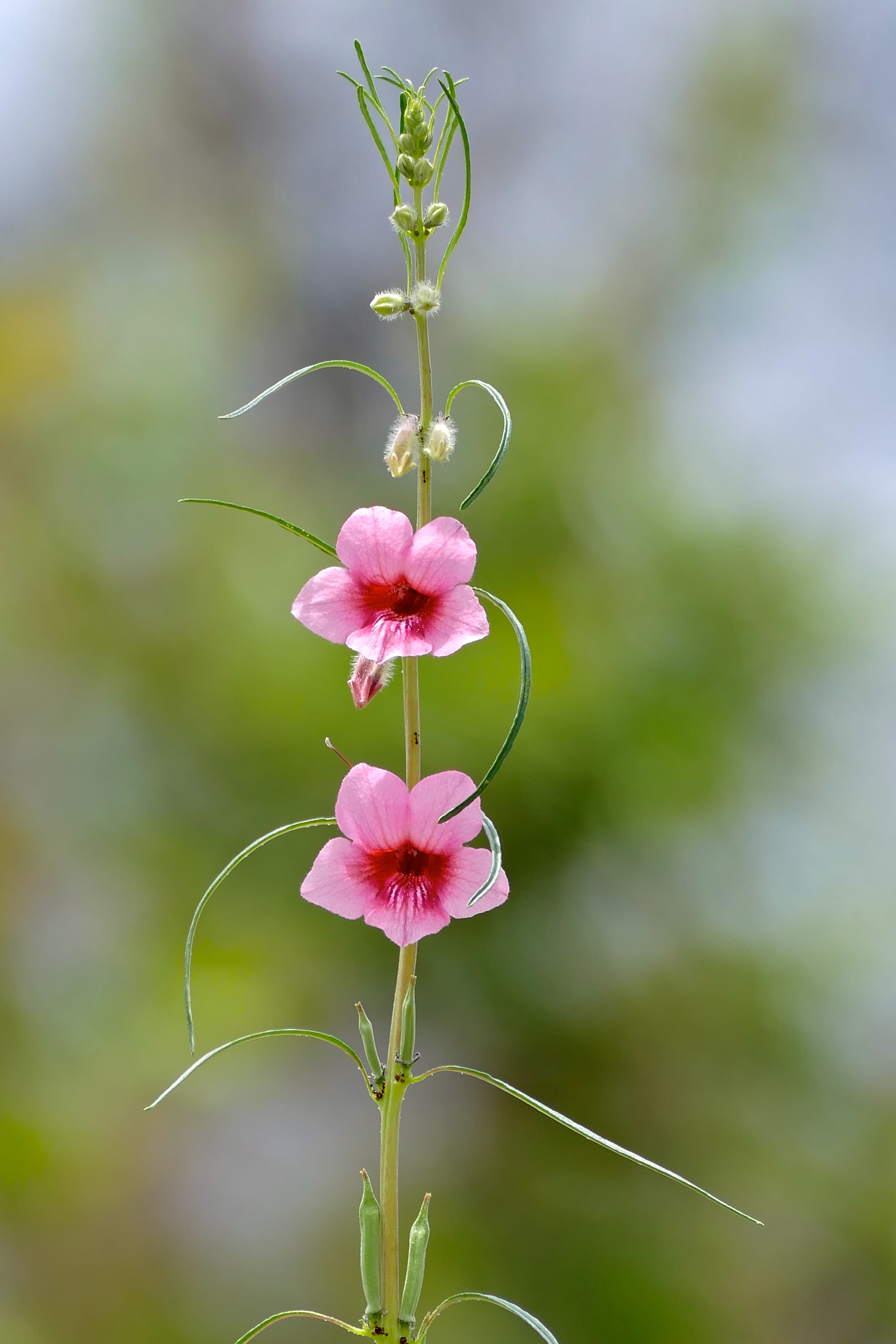
- A flowering winged-seed sesame near Kruger National Park in South Africa.

Scientific classification
- Kingdom: Plantae
- Clade: Tracheophytes
- Clade: Angiosperms
- Clade: Eudicots
- Clade: Asterids
- Order: Lamiales
- Family: Pedaliaceae
- Genus: Sesamum
- Species: S. alatum

Binomial name
- Sesamum alatum Thonn.

= Sesamum alatum =

Species of flowering plant

Sesamum alatum is a species of flowering plant in the Pedaliaceae. It is in the same genus as sesame. In English it is called winged-seed sesame. Its native range spans from Western Sahara to Egypt and south to KwaZulu-Natal in South Africa.

== Etymology ==
The scientific name for the genus Sesamum derives from Latin sesamum and Greek sēsamon; which in return derive from ancient Semitic languages, akin to Akkadian šamaššamu. The roots of the words generally referred to "oil" or "liquid fat". The scientific name for the species alatum comes from the neuter form of Latin alatus meaning "winged".

== Description ==
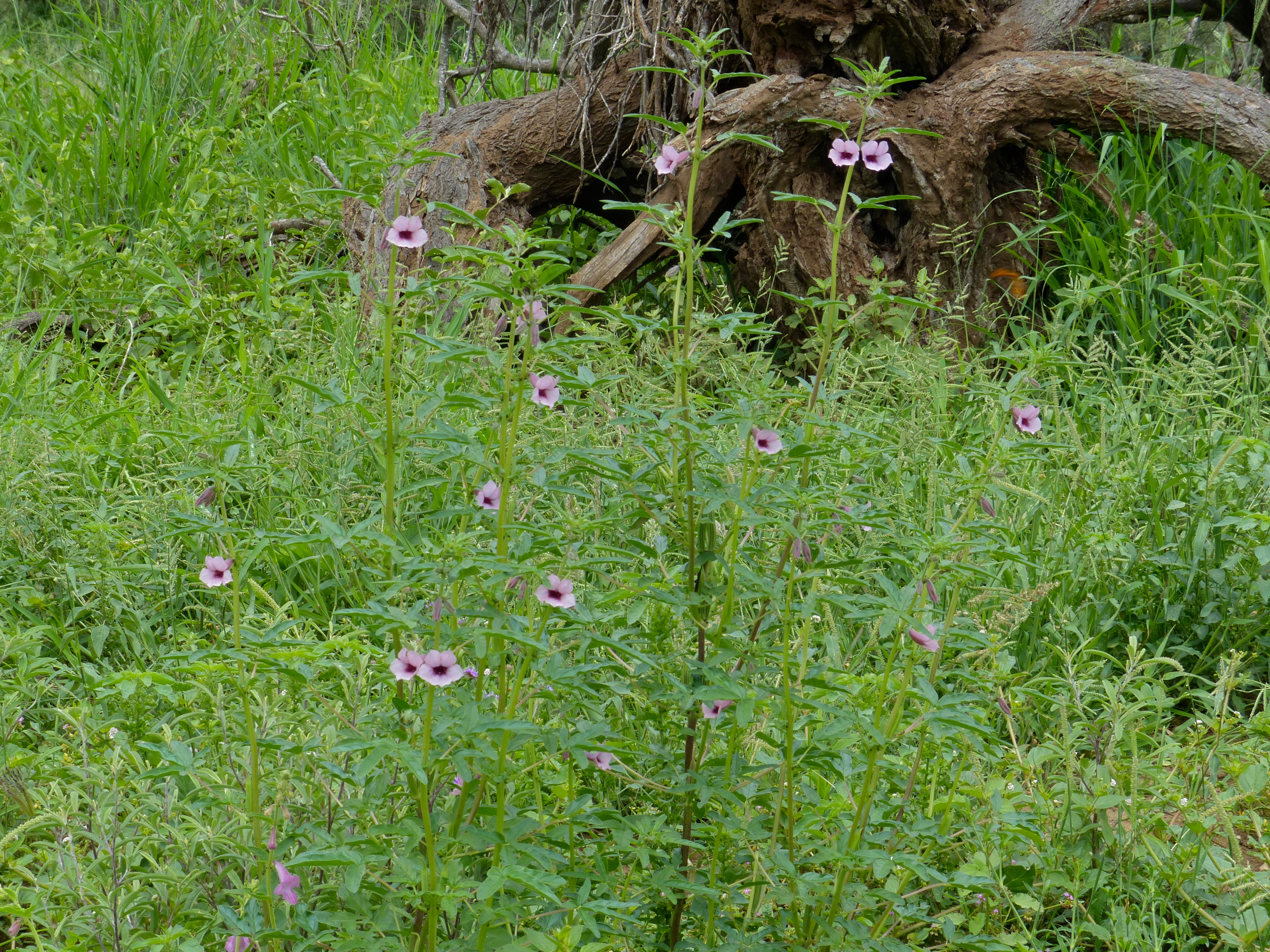
A field of winged-seed sesame in Kruger National Park.

It is an annual erect herb, reaching heights of 50 to 150 cm. It has heteromorphic leaves deeply divided into narrow, linear-lanceolate lobes; the upper leaves are simple, with the exception of some mucilage glands with an entire margin.

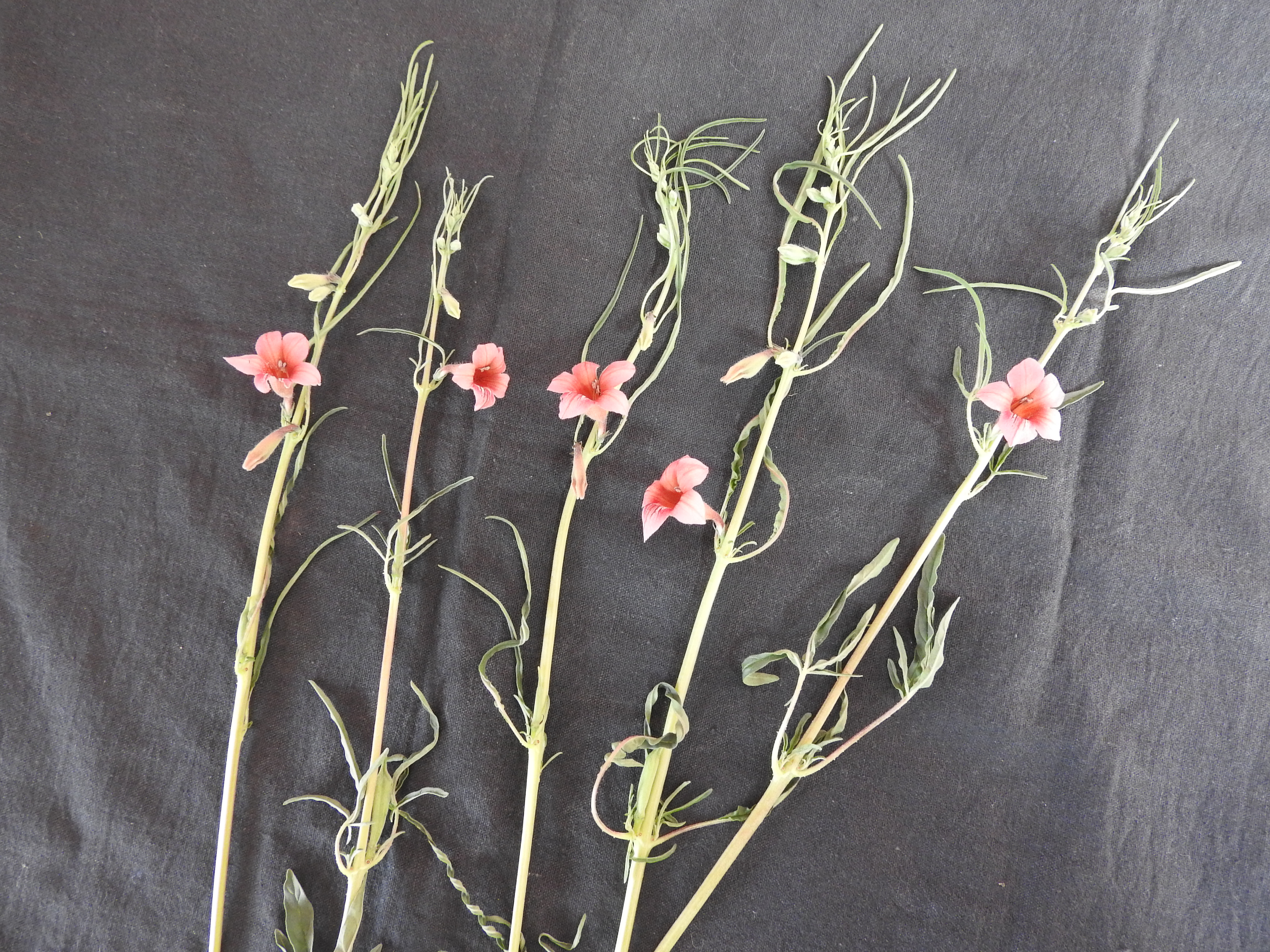
Five winged-seed sesame specimens from India.

Its flowers measure 3.5 cm in diameter and are reddish pink with darker lines in the lower lobe of the corolla. The fruit is an obconical capsule with a beak. The seeds are winged at both ends and edible.

== Use ==
=== Culinary ===
The seeds are edible and can be eaten raw, cooked, pulverized into a powder, or pressed to make oil. In Sudan the seed is both pressed for oil and the seed pods of the plant are eaten. The oil content of winged-seed sesame contains higher amounts of oleic acid and palmitic acid, but lower amounts of linoleic acid than Sesamum Indicum. In Chad, where in the local Arabic dialect they are known as Sumsum al rhazal the leaves are eaten. They are a cultivated crop in some areas of Ghana and the young shoots are edible with a mucilaginous texture; being cooked and eaten as a vegetable.

=== Medicinal ===
The Shona call the plant guzozo and throughout its native rage, locals use the plant as an aphrodisiac, a cure to diarrhoea and various intestinal disorders. Antidiabetic Renoprotective activity has been claimed to be present in the plant which are said to combat Type 2 Diabetes and other metabolic disorder, characterized by chronic hyperglycemia, although the exact compounds that are responsible for that activity has yet to be discovered.
