= Haustellum franchii =

Scientific classification
- Kingdom: Animalia
- Phylum: Mollusca
- Class: Gastropoda
- Subclass: Caenogastropoda
- Order: Neogastropoda
- Family: Muricidae
- Genus: Haustellum
- Species: H. franchii

Binomial name
- Haustellum franchii Bozzetti, 1993

Species of gastropod

Haustellum franchii is a species of sea snail, a marine gastropod mollusc in the family Muricidae, the murex snails or rock snails.
