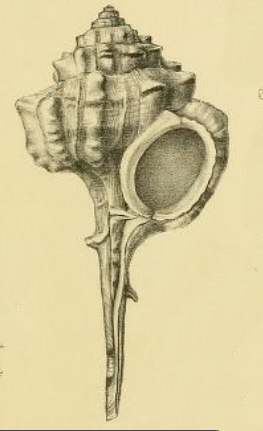
- Shell of Haustellum fallax (holotype)

Scientific classification
- Kingdom: Animalia
- Phylum: Mollusca
- Class: Gastropoda
- Subclass: Caenogastropoda
- Order: Neogastropoda
- Family: Muricidae
- Genus: Haustellum
- Species: H. fallax

Binomial name
- Haustellum fallax (E. A. Smith, 1901)

Synonyms
- Murex fallax E. A. Smith, 1901

= Haustellum fallax =

Species of gastropod

Haustellum fallax is a species of sea snail, a marine gastropod mollusc in the family Muricidae, the murex snails or rock snails.
