= Vangueriopsis =

Scientific classification
- Kingdom: Plantae
- Clade: Tracheophytes
- Clade: Angiosperms
- Clade: Eudicots
- Clade: Asterids
- Order: Gentianales
- Family: Rubiaceae
- Subfamily: Dialypetalanthoideae
- Tribe: Vanguerieae
- Genus: Vangueriopsis; Robyns

Type species
- Vangueriopsis lanciflora Robyns

Genus of plants

Vangueriopsis is a genus of flowering plants in the family Rubiaceae.

== Distribution ==
The genus is found in central and south tropical Africa (D.R.Congo to Tanzania and South Africa).

== Taxonomy ==
It was originally described by Walter Robyns in 1928 and contained 18 species in two subgenera Brachyanthus and Rostranthus. Since then most of the species have been transferred to Vangueriella and currently only four species names remain valid.

== Species ==
- Vangueriopsis lanciflora (Hiern) Robyns
- Vangueriopsis longiflora Verdc.
- Vangueriopsis rubiginosa Robyns
- Vangueriopsis shimbaensis A.P.Davis & Q.Luke
