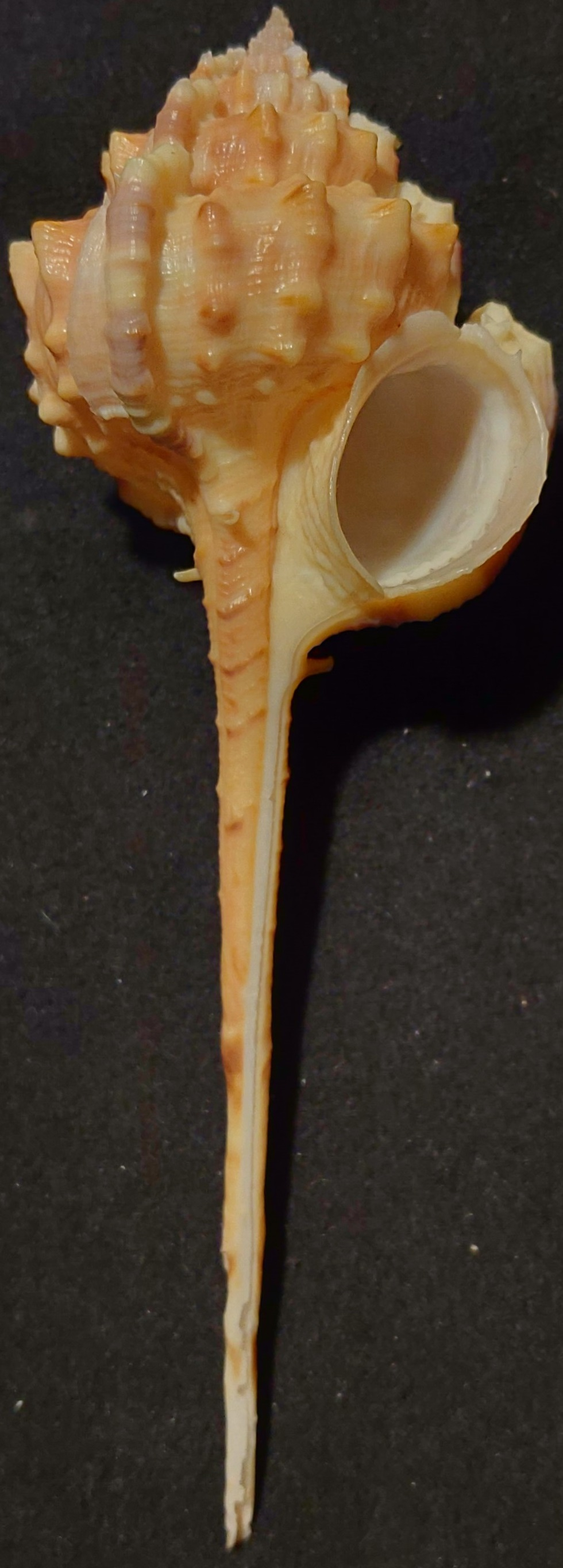

Scientific classification
- Kingdom: Animalia
- Phylum: Mollusca
- Class: Gastropoda
- Subclass: Caenogastropoda
- Order: Neogastropoda
- Family: Muricidae
- Genus: Haustellum
- Species: H. kurodai

Binomial name
- Haustellum kurodai Shikama, 1964

Synonyms
- Haustellum kurodai kurodai (Shikama, 1964); Murex (Haustellum) kurodai Shikama, 1964 (original combination)

= Haustellum kurodai =

Species of gastropod

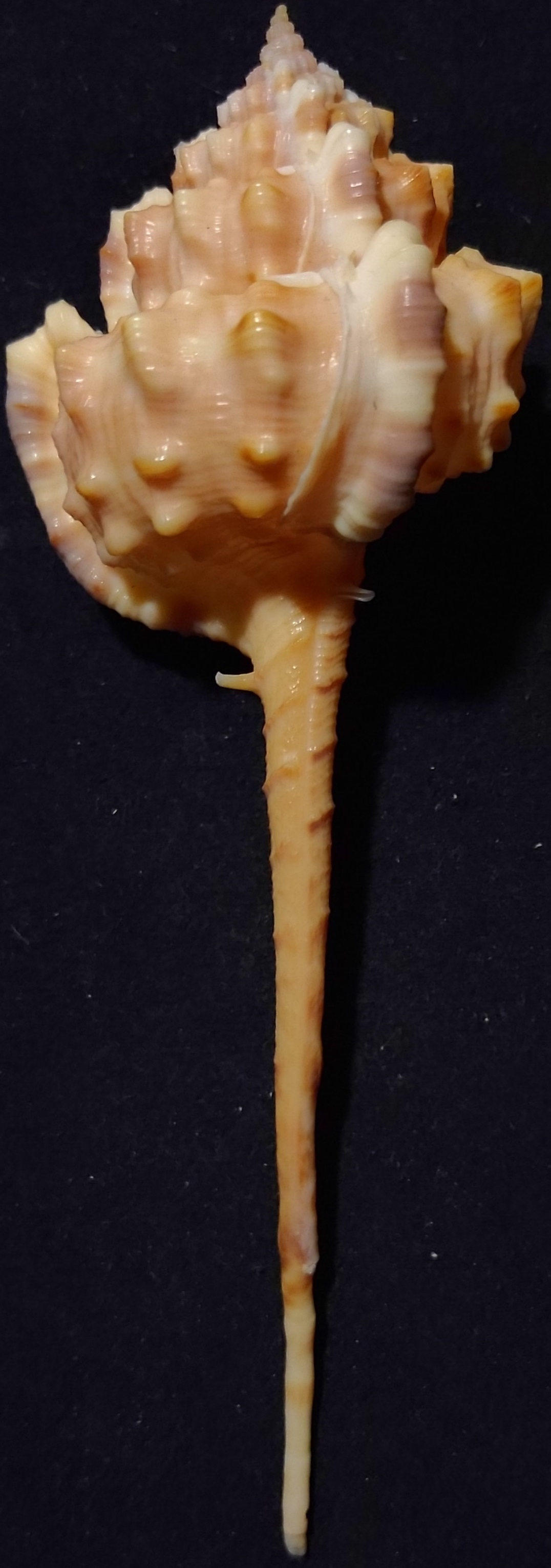

Haustellum kurodai is a species of sea snail, a marine gastropod mollusc in the family Muricidae, the murex snails or rock snails.

Subspecies

- Haustellum kurodai kurodai (Shikama, 1964): synonym of Haustellum kurodai Shikama, 1964
- Haustellum kurodai langleitae Houart, 1993: synonym of Haustellum langleitae Houart, 1993
- Haustellum kurodai vicdani Kosuge, 1980: synonym of Haustellum vicdani Kosuge, 1980
