= Vangueriopsis lanciflora =

Scientific classification
- Kingdom: Plantae
- Clade: Tracheophytes
- Clade: Angiosperms
- Clade: Eudicots
- Clade: Asterids
- Order: Gentianales
- Family: Rubiaceae
- Genus: Vangueriopsis
- Species: V. lanciflora

Binomial name
- Vangueriopsis lanciflora (Hiern) Robyns

Synonyms
- Plectronia lanciflora (Hiern) Eyles; Canthium lanciflorum Hiern; Plectronia platyphylla (Hiern) K.Schum.; Canthium platyphyllum Hiern; Vangueria lateritia Dinter; Vangueriopsis lancifolia Greenway

Species of plant

Vangueriopsis lanciflora is a species of flowering plants in the family Rubiaceae. The species has the largest distribution area of the genus and occurs in Central and South Tropical Africa (D.R.Congo to Tanzania and South Africa).
