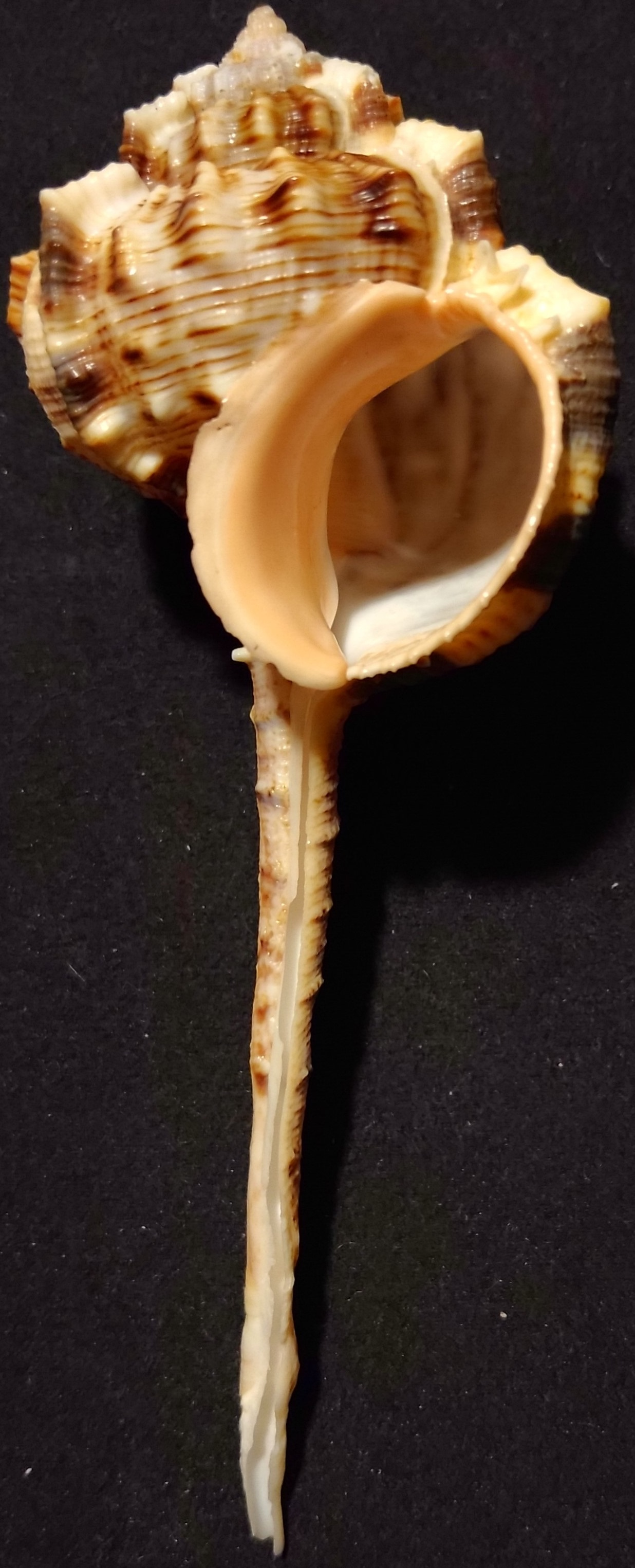

Scientific classification
- Kingdom: Animalia
- Phylum: Mollusca
- Class: Gastropoda
- Subclass: Caenogastropoda
- Order: Neogastropoda
- Family: Muricidae
- Genus: Haustellum
- Species: H. haustellum

Binomial name
- Haustellum haustellum (Linnaeus, 1758)

Synonyms
- Aranea denudata Perry, 1811; Haustellum laeve Schumacher, 1817; Murex erythrostoma Swainson, 1840; Murex haustellum Linnaeus, 1758; Murex scolopaceus Röding, 1798

= Haustellum haustellum =

Species of gastropod

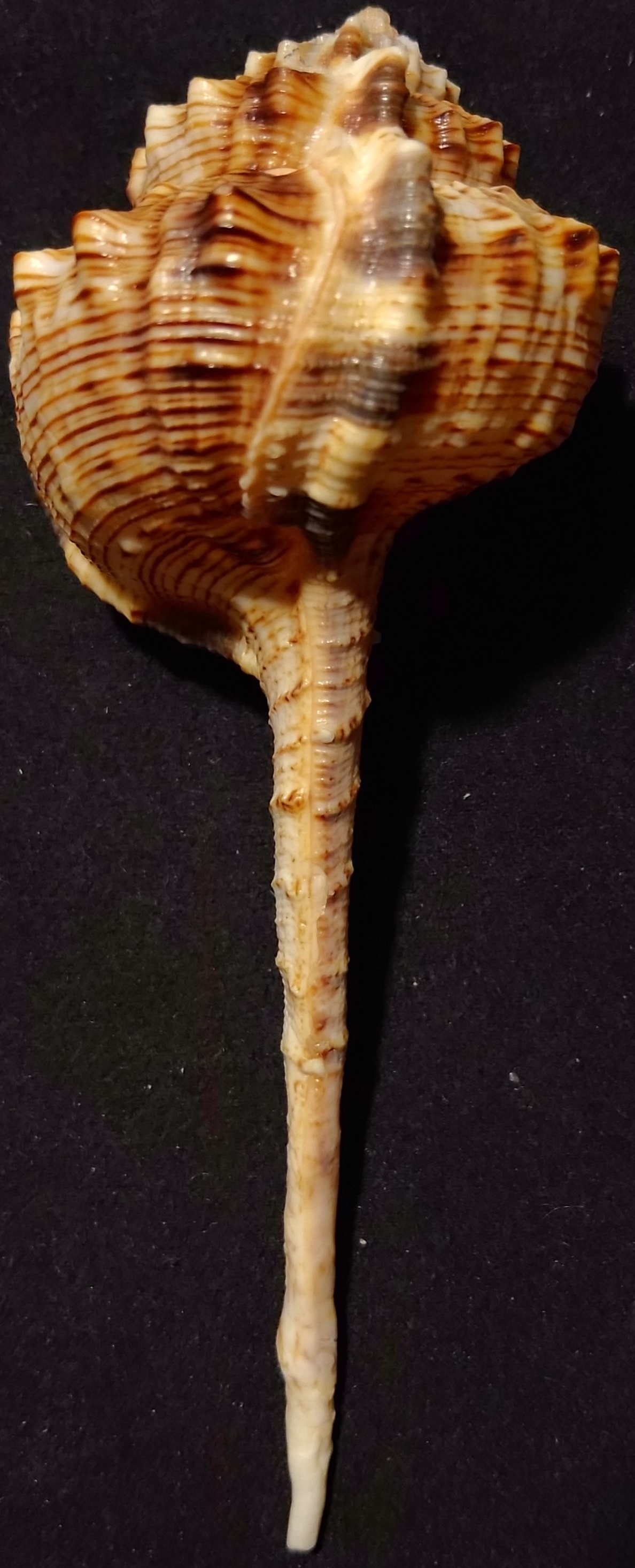

Haustellum haustellum is a species of sea snail, a marine gastropod mollusc in the family Muricidae, the murex snails or rock snails. It is the type species of the genus Haustellum Schumacher, 1817.

== Distribution ==
Haustellum haustellum is known from Taiwan, Indonesia, Vietnam, the Solomon Islands, northern Queensland in Australia, New Caledonia, Fiji, Madagascar, the Mascarene basin and the Red Sea.

== Paleontology ==
Haustellum haustellum is recorded from the Miocene of Borneo, the Pliocene of Java, Indonesia and the Plio-Pleistocene of the Malaysian Archipelago.
