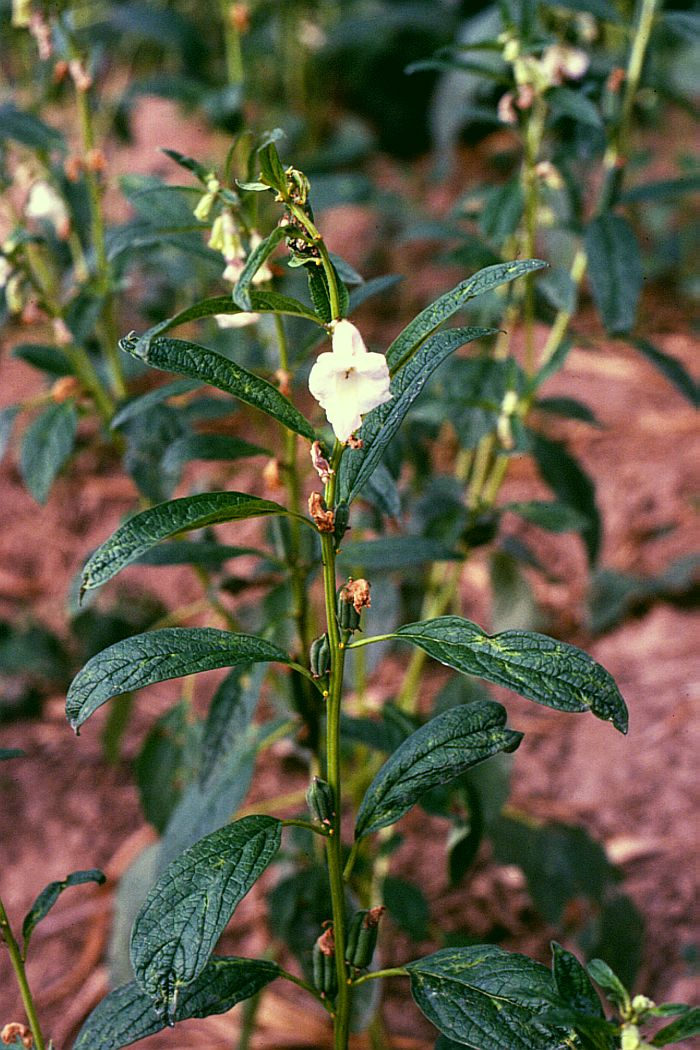
- Sesamum indicum

Scientific classification
- Kingdom: Plantae
- Clade: Tracheophytes
- Clade: Angiosperms
- Clade: Eudicots
- Clade: Asterids
- Order: Lamiales
- Family: Pedaliaceae
- Genus: Sesamum; L.

Species
- See text

= Sesamum =

Genus of flowering plants

Sesamum is a genus of 31 species in the flowering plant family Pedaliaceae. The plants are annual or perennial herbs with edible seeds. The best-known member of the genus is sesame, Sesamum indicum (syn. Sesamum orientale), the source of sesame seeds. The species are primarily African, with some species occurring in India, Sri Lanka, and China. The origin of S. indicum is uncertain, as it is widely cultivated and naturalized in tropical regions.

== Species ==
Species include:

- Sesamum abbreviatum Merxm.
- Sesamum alatum Thonn.
- Sesamum angolense Welw.
- Sesamum biapiculatum De Wild.
- Sesamum calycinum Welw.
- Sesamum capense Burm. f.
- Sesamum digitaloides Welw. ex Schinz
- Sesamum gracile Endl.
- Sesamum hopkinsii Suess.
- Sesamum indicum L.
- Sesamum lamiifolium Engl.
- Sesamum latifolium J.B. Gillett
- Sesamum lepidotum Schinz
- Sesamum macranthum Oliv.
- Sesamum marlothii Engl.
- Sesamum mombazense De Wild. & T.Durand
- Sesamum parviflorum Seidenst.
- Sesamum pedalioides Welw. ex Hiern
- Sesamum radiatum Schumach. & Thonn.
- Sesamum rigidum Peyr.
- Sesamum rostratum Hochst.
- Sesamum sabulosum A.Chev.
- Sesamum schinzianum Asch.
- Sesamum somalense Chiov.
- Sesamum thonneri De Wild. & T. Durand
- Sesamum triphyllum Welw. ex Asch.

== Gallery ==
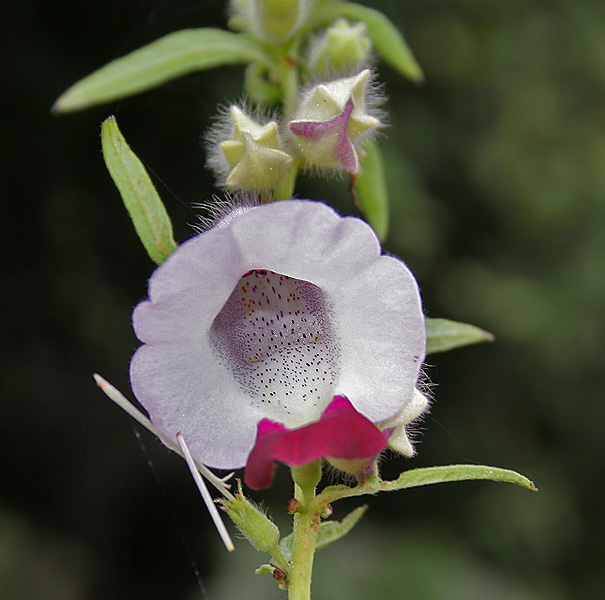
Sesamum indicum

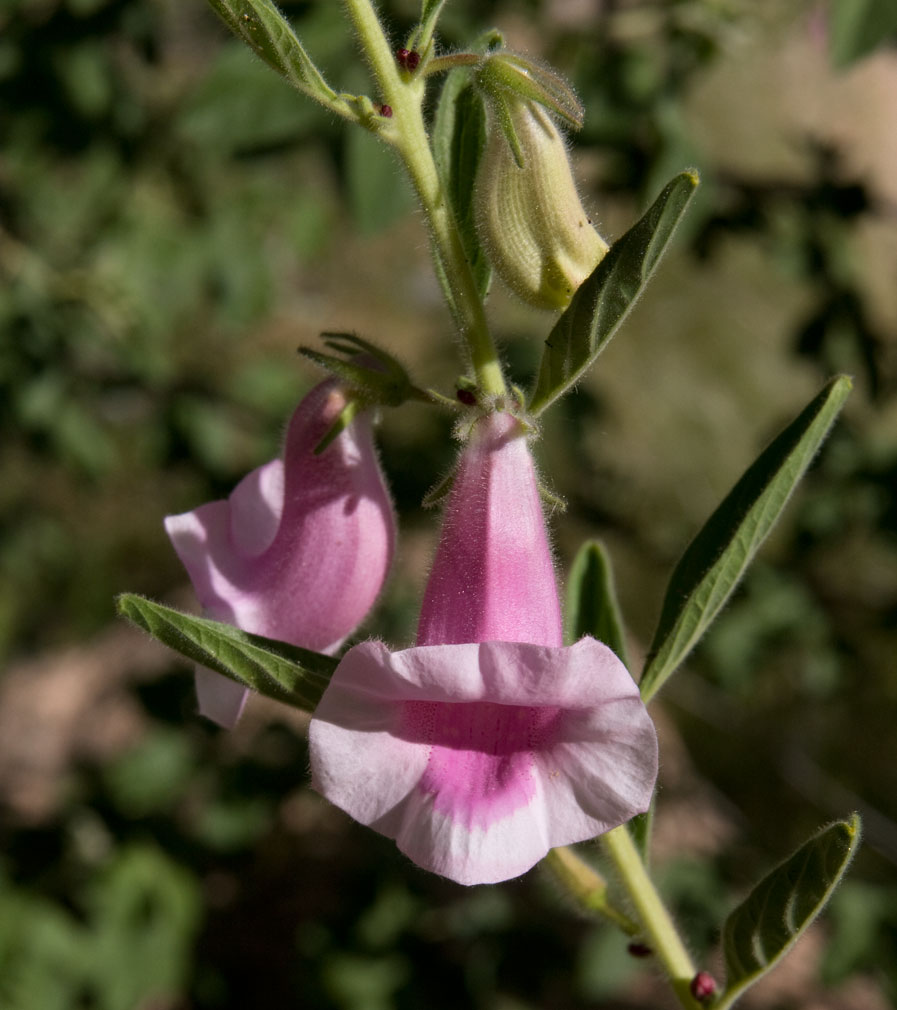
Sesamum rigidum

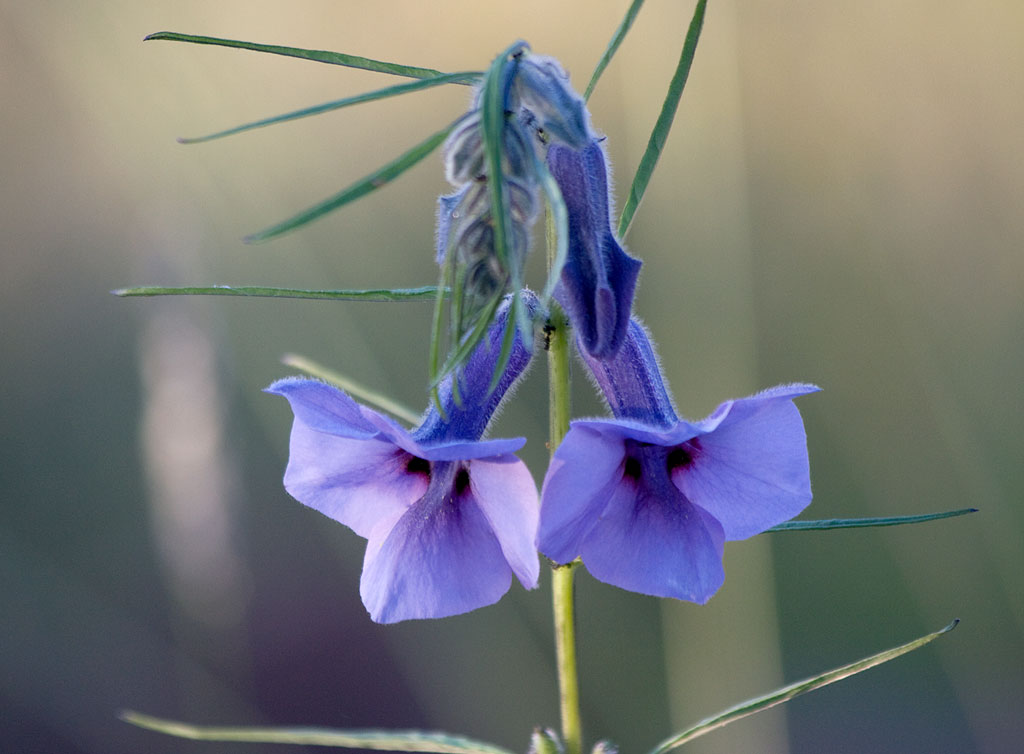
Sesamum triphyllum

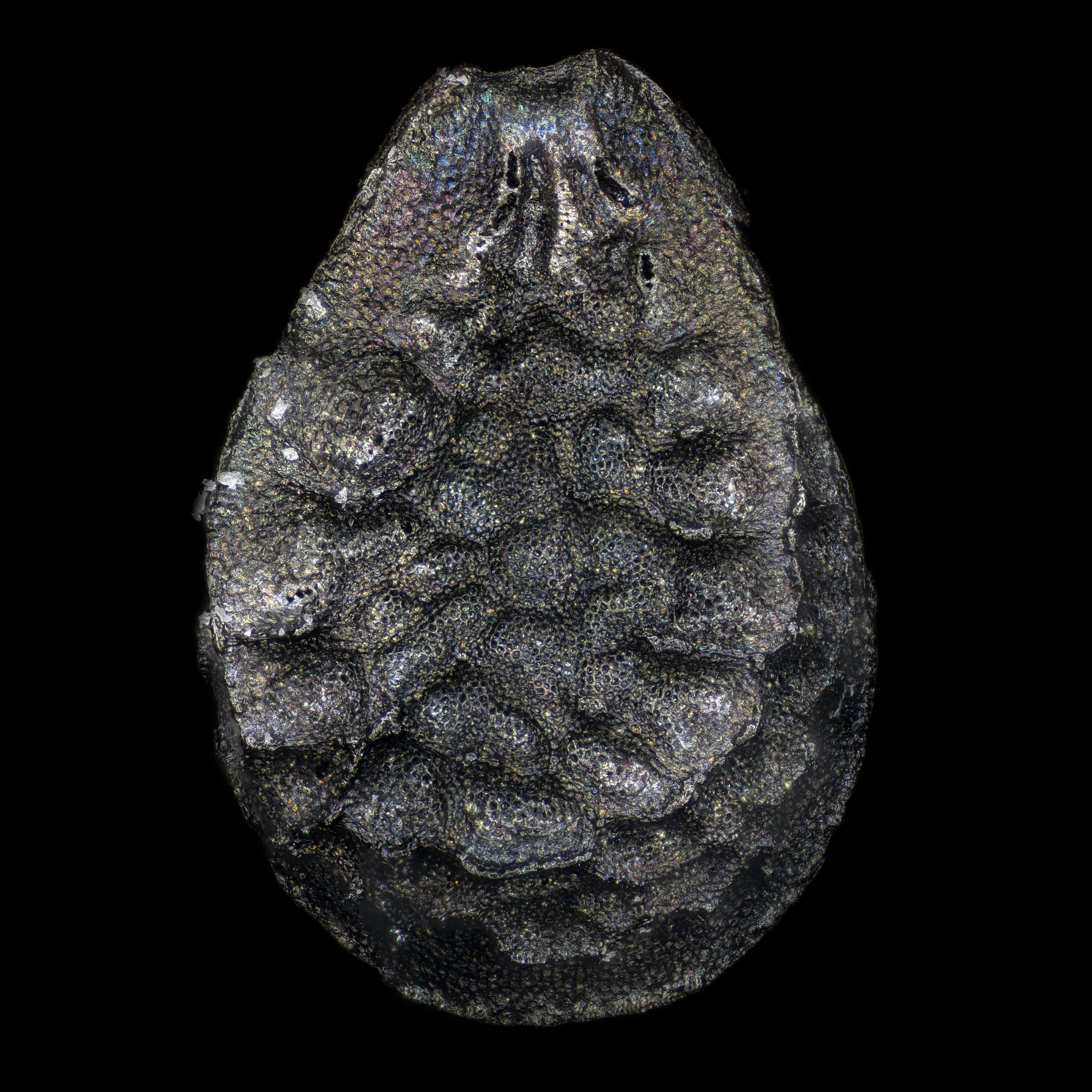
Seed under a microscope
