= Sesamum schinzianum =

Scientific classification
- Kingdom: Plantae
- Clade: Tracheophytes
- Clade: Angiosperms
- Clade: Eudicots
- Clade: Asterids
- Order: Lamiales
- Family: Pedaliaceae
- Genus: Sesamum
- Species: S. schinzianum

Binomial name
- Sesamum schinzianum Asch.

Synonyms
- Sesamum antirrhinoides Welw. ex Asch.; Volkameria antirrhinoides (Welw. ex Asch.) Kuntze; Volkameria schinziana (Asch.) Kuntze

Species of plant in the sesame family

Sesamum schinzianum is a species of flowering plant in the Pedaliaceae family.

It is native to Angola and Namibia. It was originally described by Schinz based on information from Ascherson.
