= Vangueriopsis longiflora =

Conservation status
- Vulnerable (IUCN 2.3)

Scientific classification
- Kingdom: Plantae
- Clade: Tracheophytes
- Clade: Angiosperms
- Clade: Eudicots
- Clade: Asterids
- Order: Gentianales
- Family: Rubiaceae
- Genus: Vangueriopsis
- Species: V. longiflora

Binomial name
- Vangueriopsis longiflora Verdc.

Species of plant

Vangueriopsis longiflora is a species of flowering plants in the family Rubiaceae. It is endemic to Tanzania.
