= Peter Thonning =

Danish physician and botanist (1775–1848)

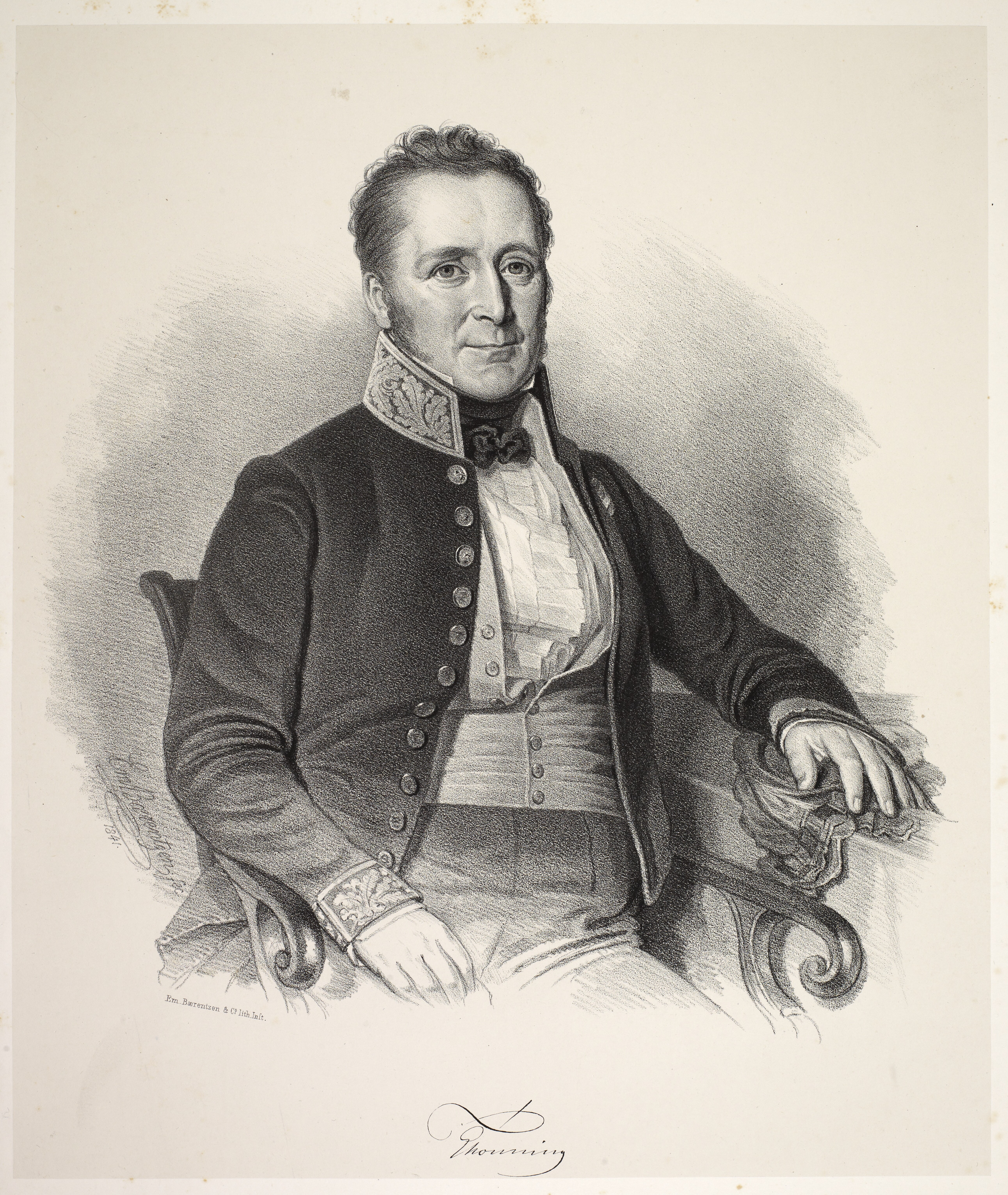
Peter Thonning

Peter Thonning (9 October 1775 – 29 January 1848) was a Danish medical doctor and botanist.

== Biography ==
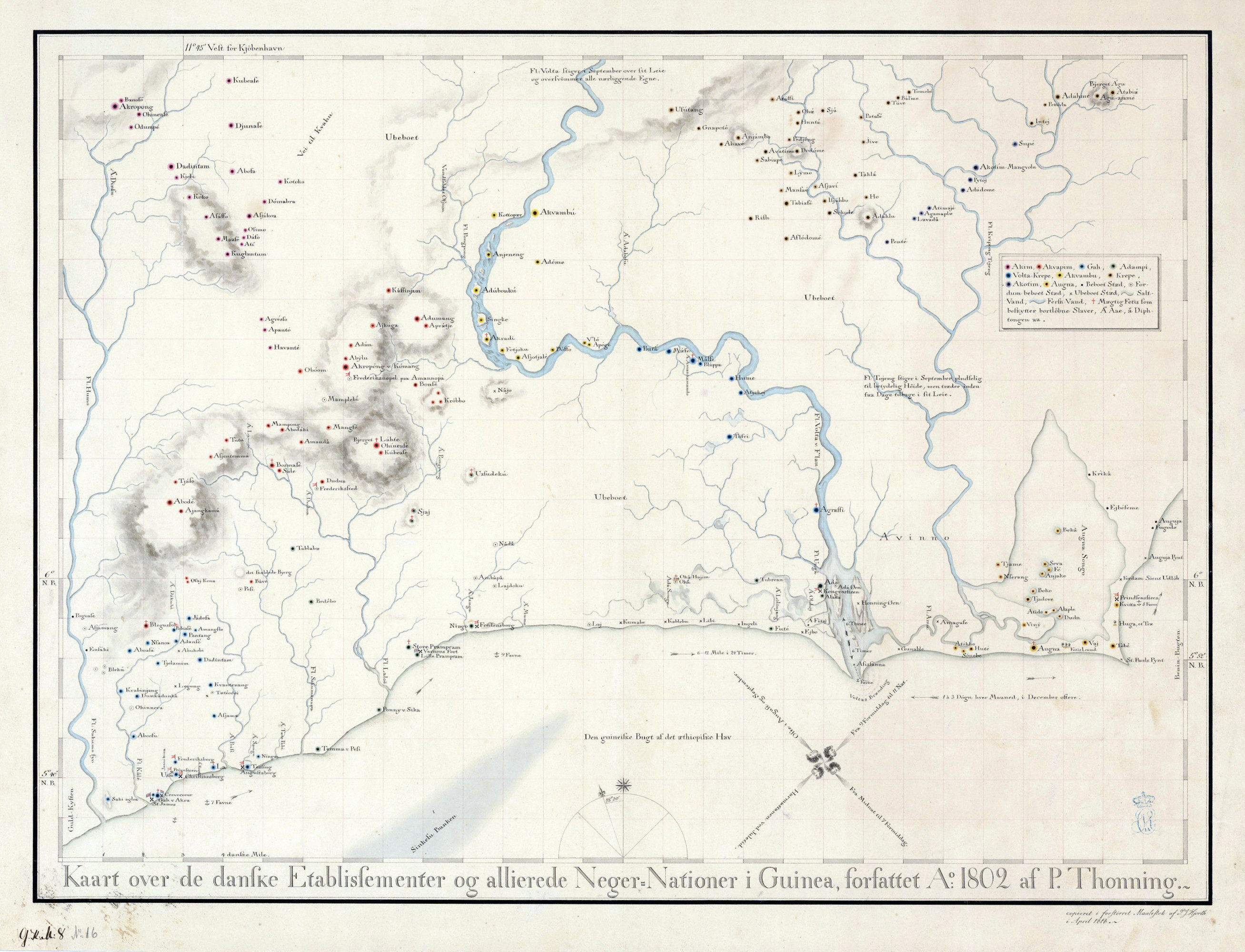
Peter Thonning's map of the Danish establishments on the Gold Coast, copied in 1818 by P. J. Hjort.

Peter Thonning was born in Copenhagen, Denmark. He was the son of Rasmus Andersen Thonning (1740–1817) and Dorothea Spendrup (1755–1835). He became a student in 1794 and studied medicine at the Metropolitanskolen.

He was sent to Ghana by the Danish government mainly to study the conditions of plants, especially indigenous plants. He lived there from 1799 to 1803. Thonning had begun systematizing his botanical collections, but his herbarium was destroyed during the shelling of Copenhagen by the British in 1807. Only the duplicates and manuscripts in the possession of Heinrich Christian Friedrich Schumacher (1757–1830) survived. Today, around 1,050 samples are preserved at the University of Copenhagen Botanical Garden.

Thonning tutored Ferdinand, Hereditary Prince of Denmark (1792–1863) from 1804 to 1810. He served as secretary of the General Customs Board (Generaltoldkammeret) in 1810 and from 1812 also secretary of the Canal, Port and Lighthouse Directorate (Kanal, Havne og Fyrdirektionen). He was a member of this executive board in 1815–16. In 1829, he joined the executive board of the Natural History Museum of Denmark and held this position until his death.

== Personal life ==
Thonning married Anna Maria Nicolina Kamphøffner (1784–1860) in 1810. He died in Copenhagen during 1848 and was buried at Assistens Cemetery.

== Authority name ==
The genus Thonningia of parasitic plants was named after him by Martin Vahl. This botanist is denoted by the author abbreviation Thonn. when citing a botanical name.

== Other sources ==
- Daniel Hopkins (2012) Peter Thonning and Denmark's Guinea Commission: A Study in Nineteenth-Century African Colonial Geography (Brill. The Atlantic World, Volume: 24)ISBN 978-9004228689
