= Heinrich Christian Friedrich Schumacher =

Danish surgeon, botanist and professor of anatomy

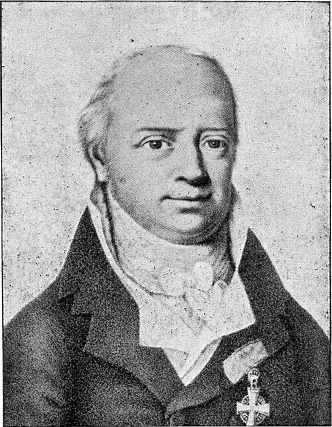

Heinrich Christian Friedrich Schumacher (15 November 1757 in Glückstadt, Holstein – 9 December 1830) was a Danish surgeon, botanist and professor of anatomy at the University of Copenhagen. Schumacher carried out significant research work in malacology, in other words on molluscs, and described several taxa.

== Life ==
=== Early years (1757-1778) ===
He was born to Joachim Christian Schumacher, a sergeant in the infantry of the Duchy of Schleswig, and his wife, Caroline Magdalene in Glückstadt in present-day Germany. In spite of his family's limited means, he received a good upbringing, and was sent to grammar school in Rendsburg. After confirmation became the apprentice of the regiment surgeon, Mehl, a learned and skilled man, who gave his eager student a thorough introduction to both medicine and botany, thereby waking Schumacher's natural gift for science. By 1773, at the age of 16, his keen efforts got him appointed as a military surgeon with his father's battalion in the army stationed in Rendsburg, working under Dr. Mehl's command.

In 1777 he got an 8-month leave from the army enroll as a student at Theatrum Anatomico-chirurgicum in Copenhagen (now a part of the faculty of medicine at the University of Copenhagen). While in Copenhagen he lived on nothing but an advance on his rather low wage and in 1778 he returned starved to his post in Rendsburg. He had however made a good enough impression on professor Christen Friis Rottbøll for him to call Schumacher back to Copenhagen to finish the education and to a position as prosector at the University of Copenhagen.

=== Choice of profession (1778-1789) ===
This was his opportunity to begin a scientific career. He graduated from Theatrum Anatomico-chirurgicum no later than 1779, and begun studying botany under the guidance of both Rottbøll and Martin Vahl, who had recently become lecturer at the University of Copenhagen Botanical Garden.

Intending to follow Vahl's example Schumacher embarked upon what was intended to be an international research tour in 1784, but the timetable of the ship was changed at the last minute and he got no further than the Baltic Sea. This forced him to change his plans altogether and returning to Copenhagen he became a surgeon at both Theatrum Anatomico-chirurgicum and at Frederiks Hospital. In 1786 he took the exam of the recently started surgical academy and a position as lecturer at the academy.

Later that year he received a scholarship and finally embarked on a study trip around Europe from 1786 to 1789. In Paris he studied chemistry in the lectures of Antoine Lavoisier and Antoine François, comte de Fourcroy and botany with Antoine Laurent de Jussieu. And in London he was influenced by John Hunter among others. It had been a condition of the scholarship that he would study chemistry.

== Taxa named by him ==
A marine gastropod genus:

- Bufonaria Schumacher, 1817

== Bibliography ==
- Bemerkung einer Schusswunde – Observation of a gunshot wound – 1778 (in German)
- Om Slægten Paullinia Linn. – About the family Paullinia Linn. – 1794 (in Danish)
- Medicinisch-chirurgische Bemerkungen – Medical and surgical observations – 1800 (in German)
- Versuch eines Verzeichnisses der in den dänisch-nordischen Staaten sich findenden einfachen Mineralien mit Tabellen der einfachen Fossilien nach ihren vorwaltenden Bestandtheilen – Attempt at a list of minerals present in Denmark and Norway with tables of fossils listed by their components – 1801 (in German)
- Enumeratio plantarum in partibus Sællandiæ septentrionalis et orientalis – published in two parts 1801-03 (in Latin) (Translated into Danish in 1804 as Den kjøbenhavnske flora – The flora of Copenhagen)
- Lærebog i Anatomien. 1. Deel. Beenlære – Textbook on anatomy, part 1, osteology – 1807 (in Danish)
- Nogle Advarsler for Sunde og Syge ang. Blodgang, først meddeelte af det medicinske Fakultæt i Kiel 1798, og nu med nogle tilføyede Anmærkninger paa ny bragte i Erindring – Some warnings to the sick and healthy alike regarding circulation, first reported by the faculty of medicine in Kiel 1798, with additional remarks – 1808 (in Danish)
- De officinelle Lægemidler af Planteriget, som voxe vildt eller kunne dyrkes i de danske Stater, ordnede efter de forskjellige Aarstider, paa hvilke de indsamles – The botanical medicines, which either grow wild or could be cultivated in Denmark, sorted by season of harvest – 1808 (in Danish)
- Essai d'un nouveau système des habitations des vers testacés avec XXII planches – 1817 (in French)
- Om Abens Hierne og dens Forretninger sammenlignet med Menneskets og andre Dyrs Hierne – The brain of the apes and its functions compared to the brains of humans and other animals – 1824 (in Danish)
- Medicinsk Plantelære for studerende Læger og Pharmaceutiker – The botany of medicine for student doctors and pharmacists – 1825-26 (in Danish)
- Beskrivelse af guineiske planter, som ere fundne af danske Botanikere, især af Etatsraad Thonning – Description of plants of Guinea discovered by Danish botanists, especially by royal advisor Thonning – 1828-29 (in Danish)
