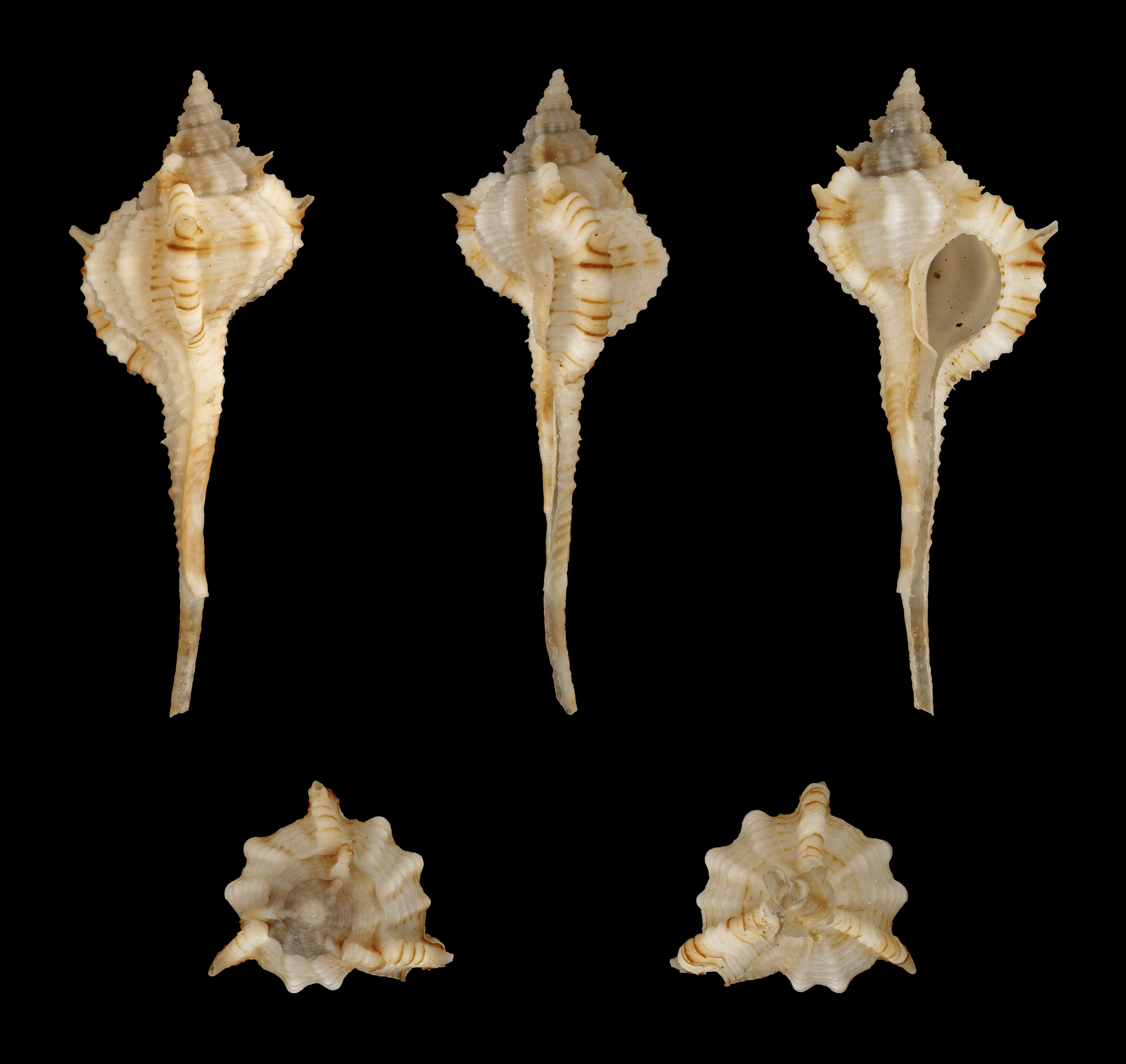
- Five views of a shell of Vokesimurex gallinago gallinago (Sowerby, 1903)

Scientific classification
- Kingdom: Animalia
- Phylum: Mollusca
- Class: Gastropoda
- Subclass: Caenogastropoda
- Order: Neogastropoda
- Family: Muricidae
- Genus: Vokesimurex
- Species: V. gallinago

Binomial name
- Vokesimurex gallinago (G.B. Sowerby III, 1903)

Synonyms
- Haustellum gallinago (G. B. Sowerby III, 1903); Murex gallinago G. B. Sowerby III, 1903 (original combination); Siratus gallinago (G. B. Sowerby III, 1903)

= Vokesimurex gallinago =

Species of gastropod

Vokesimurex gallinago, common name the hen murex, is a species of sea snail, a marine gastropod mollusk in the family Muricidae, the murex snails or rock snails.

Subspecies

- Vokesimurex gallinago fernandesi (Houart, 1990)
- Vokesimurex gallinago gallinago (G. B. Sowerby III, 1903) (synonyms:Murex senkakuensis Shikama, 1973, Murex rectirostris senkakuensis Shikama, 1973)

== Description ==
The size of the shell varies between 40 mm and 100 mm.

(Original description) This is an elegantly formed and delicately coloured shell, somewhat resembling, on a small scale, Vokesimurex malabaricus (E. A. Smith, 1894) but with the longitudinal ribs or plications much stouter and less numerous. It bears also some resemblance to Vokesimurex rectirostris (G. B. Sowerby II, 1841), but the varices are not spinose, or at least scarcely perceptibly so. In the squamose rather than spinose character of the base of the varices the shell appears to have some affinity with those of the Siratus motacilla (Gmelin, 1791) group.

== Distribution ==
This Indo-Pacific marine species occurs from Mozambique to Southeast Asia and Japan.
