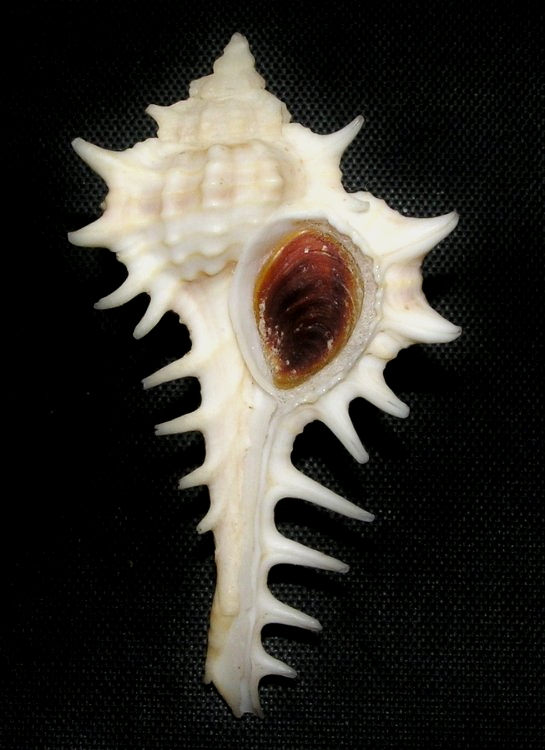
- Shell of Vokesimurex ruthae

Scientific classification
- Kingdom: Animalia
- Phylum: Mollusca
- Class: Gastropoda
- Subclass: Caenogastropoda
- Order: Neogastropoda
- Family: Muricidae
- Subfamily: Muricinae
- Genus: Vokesimurex
- Species: V. ruthae

Binomial name
- Vokesimurex ruthae (Vokes, 1988)

Synonyms
- Murex (Haustellum) ruthae Vokes, 1988

= Vokesimurex ruthae =

Species of gastropod

Vokesimurex ruthae is a species of sea snail, a marine gastropod mollusk in the family Muricidae, the murex snails or rock snails.

== Description ==
The length of the shell attains 69.4 mm.

== Distribution ==
This marine species occurs in the Gulf of California.
