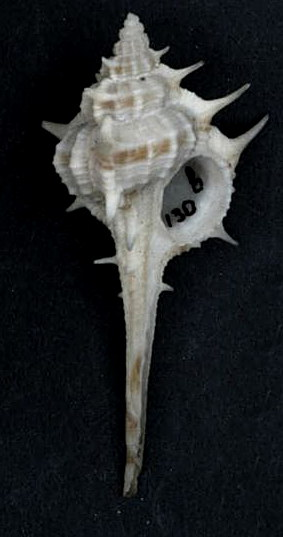
- Shell of Vokesimurex sobrinus (museum specimen at Naturalis Biodiversity Center)

Scientific classification
- Kingdom: Animalia
- Phylum: Mollusca
- Class: Gastropoda
- Subclass: Caenogastropoda
- Order: Neogastropoda
- Family: Muricidae
- Subfamily: Muricinae
- Genus: Vokesimurex
- Species: V. sobrinus

Binomial name
- Vokesimurex sobrinus (A. Adams, 1863)

Synonyms
- Haustellum sobrinus (A. Adams, 1863); Murex sobrinus A. Adams, 1863 (original combination)

= Vokesimurex sobrinus =

Species of gastropod

Vokesimurex sobrinus is a species of sea snail, a marine gastropod mollusk in the family Muricidae, the murex snails or rock snails.

== Description ==
The size of the shell varies between 37 mm and 77 mm.

The ovate shell has an acute spire. It contains seven convex whorls. These are longitudinally nodosely plicate and transversely lirate with three varices. The shell is very spiny, with two sharp hooked spines. The aperture is almost round. The siphonal canal is straight, closed and very produced. It is spiny at the base. There are two red-brown bands on the body whorl, and the end of the long straight beak is variegated with the same colour.

== Distribution ==
This marine species occurs off Japan, Korea and China.
