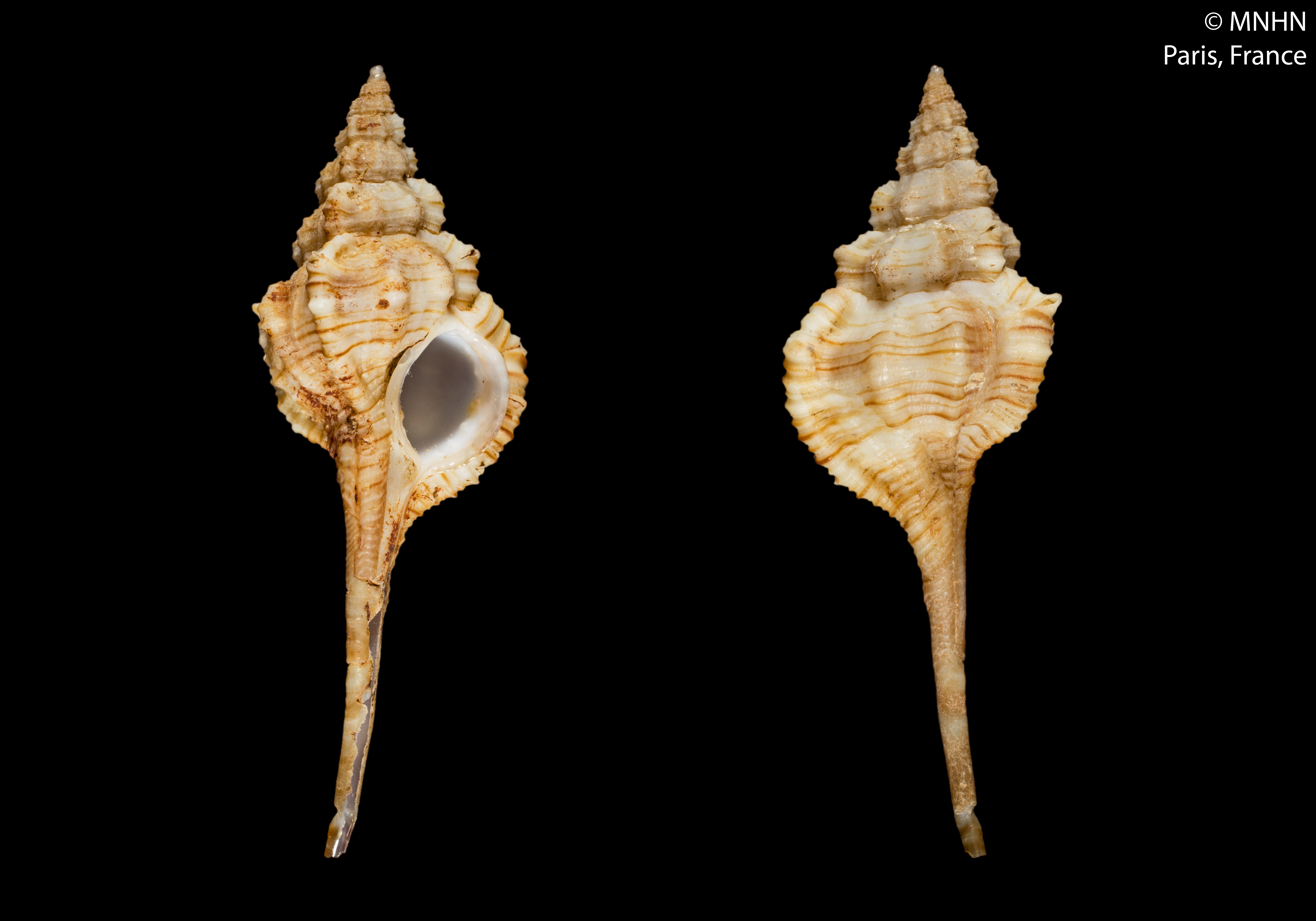
- Shell of Vokesimurex rectaspira (holotype at MNHN, Paris)

Scientific classification
- Kingdom: Animalia
- Phylum: Mollusca
- Class: Gastropoda
- Subclass: Caenogastropoda
- Order: Neogastropoda
- Family: Muricidae
- Subfamily: Muricinae
- Genus: Vokesimurex
- Species: V. rectaspira

Binomial name
- Vokesimurex rectaspira Houart & Héros, 2015

= Vokesimurex rectaspira =

Species of gastropod

Vokesimurex rectaspira is a species of sea snail, a marine gastropod mollusk in the family Muricidae, the murex snails or rock snails.

== Distribution ==
This marine species occurs off Madagascar.
