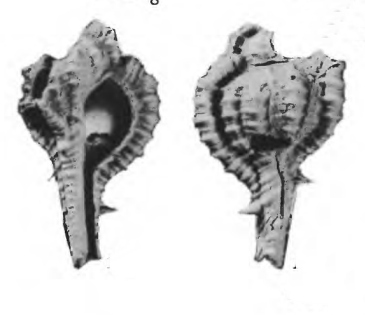
- Shell of Vokesimurex coulsoni (holotype)

Scientific classification
- Kingdom: Animalia
- Phylum: Mollusca
- Class: Gastropoda
- Subclass: Caenogastropoda
- Order: Neogastropoda
- Family: Muricidae
- Subfamily: Muricinae
- Genus: Vokesimurex
- Species: †V. coulsoni

Binomial name
- †Vokesimurex coulsoni (Ladd, 1977)

Synonyms
- Murex (Murex) bantamensis coulsoni Ladd, 1977 ·

= Vokesimurex coulsoni =

Species of gastropod

Vokesimurex coulsoni is an extinct species of sea snail, a marine gastropod mollusk in the family Muricidae, the murex snails or rock snails.

== Description ==
The length of the shell attains 24.3 mm, its diameter 15.6 mm.

The small shell has strongly inflated whorls, separated by a deep suture. The aperture is small, ovate with a thin, erect peristome that is crenulated to form the outer lip that is conspicuously dentate within. The inner lip has a smooth margin but shows internally several rounded denticles anteriorly. Posteriorly, the peristome bears a shallow notch, anteriorly, it is extended as a narrow siphonal canal that is almost completely roofed over. Each whorl has three prominent varices which, on the body whorl, converge to the base of the anterior canal. The varices of the body whorl are aligned with those of earlier whorls. Two to four axial ribs are present between each two varices. The varices and ribs are overridden by alternating primary and secondary spirals, the primary spirals, on some specimens, being extended as short spines.

== Distribution ==
Fossils of this marine species were found in Pliocene and late Miocene strata off Fiji.

The Fijian fossils are closely related to † Vokesimurex multiplicatus bantamensis (K. Martin, 1895) and may be identical with that species, known from the Neogene of Java (Martin, 1895, p. 126, pi. 19, figs. 288–290) and of North Borneo (Cox, 1948, p. 43, pi. 4, fig. 4a-c) and the Pliocene of Timor (Tesch, 1915, p. 63, pi. 81, fig. 140).
