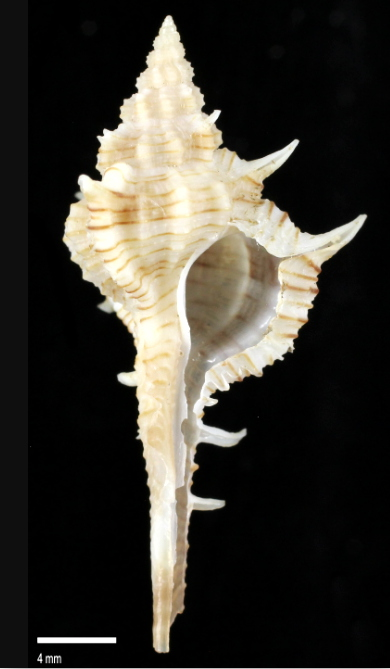
- Shell of Vokesimurex dolichourus (specimen at MNHN, Paris)

Scientific classification
- Kingdom: Animalia
- Phylum: Mollusca
- Class: Gastropoda
- Subclass: Caenogastropoda
- Order: Neogastropoda
- Family: Muricidae
- Subfamily: Muricinae
- Genus: Vokesimurex
- Species: V. dolichourus

Binomial name
- Vokesimurex dolichourus (Ponder & Vokes, 1988)

Synonyms
- Haustellum dolichourus Ponder & Vokes, 1988

= Vokesimurex dolichourus =

Species of gastropod

Vokesimurex dolichourus is a species of sea snail, a marine gastropod mollusk in the family Muricidae, the murex snails or rock snails.

== Description ==
The length of the shell varies between 49 mm and 74 mm.

== Distribution ==
This marine species occurs in the Indo-west Pacific, from Oman and Madagascar to Vanuatu; also off Australia (Queensland).
