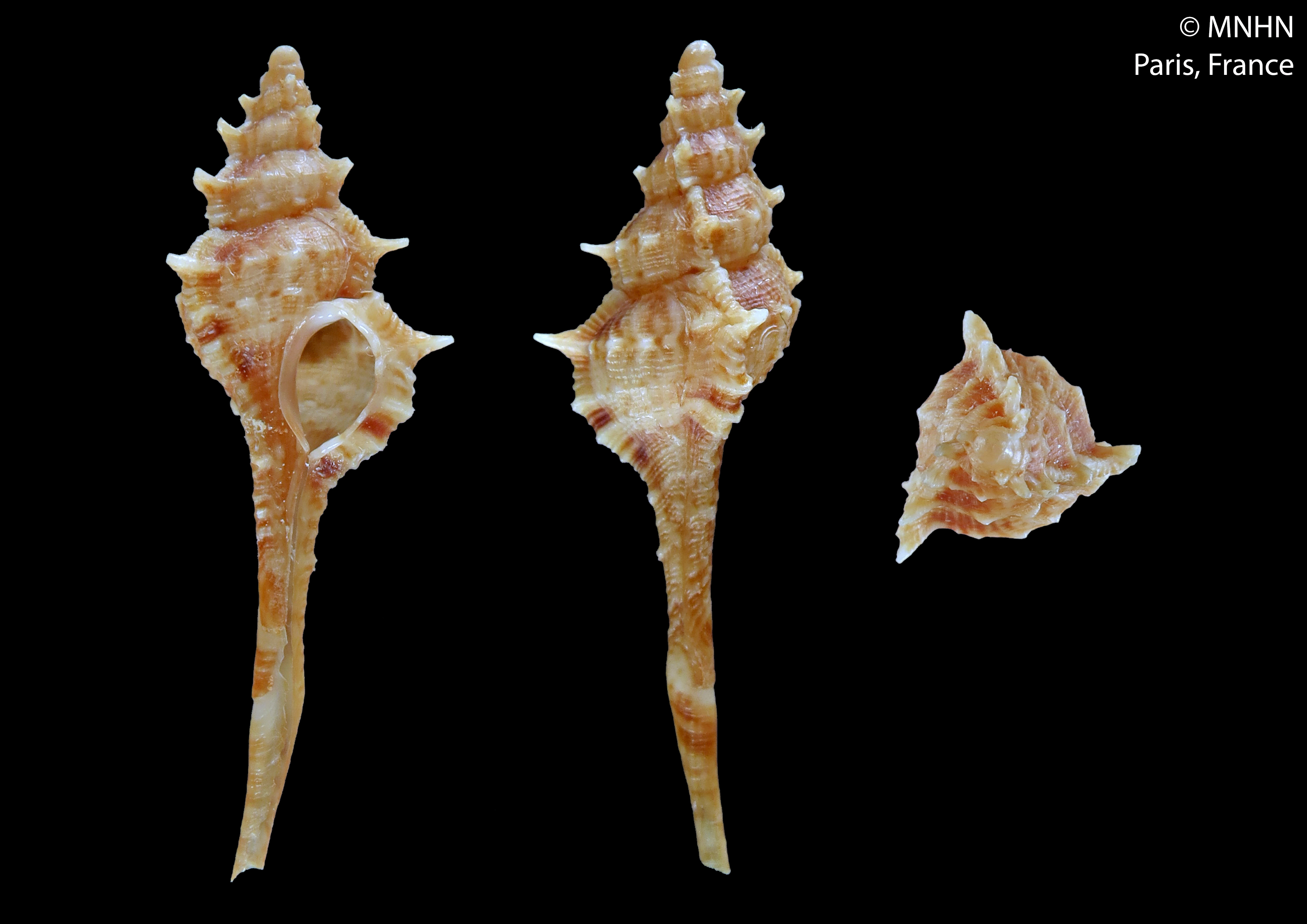
- Shell of Vokesimurex micropurdyae (holotype at MNHN, Paris)

Scientific classification
- Kingdom: Animalia
- Phylum: Mollusca
- Class: Gastropoda
- Subclass: Caenogastropoda
- Order: Neogastropoda
- Family: Muricidae
- Subfamily: Muricinae
- Genus: Vokesimurex
- Species: V. micropurdyae

Binomial name
- Vokesimurex micropurdyae Houart & Rosado, 2018

= Vokesimurex micropurdyae =

Species of gastropod

Vokesimurex micropurdyae is a species of sea snail, a marine gastropod mollusk in the family Muricidae, the murex snails or rock snails.

== Description ==
The length of the shell attains 29.9 mm.

== Distribution ==
This marine species occurs off Mozambique at a depth of 140–190 m.
