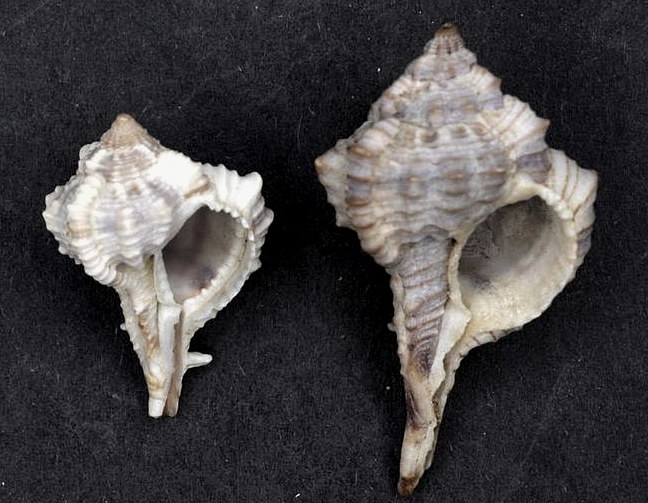
- Two shells of Vokesimurex chrysostoma (museum specimens at Naturalis Biodiversity Center)

Scientific classification
- Kingdom: Animalia
- Phylum: Mollusca
- Class: Gastropoda
- Subclass: Caenogastropoda
- Order: Neogastropoda
- Family: Muricidae
- Genus: Vokesimurex
- Species: V. chrysostoma

Binomial name
- Vokesimurex chrysostoma (Sowerby II, 1834)

Synonyms
- Murex bellus Reeve, 1845; Murex chrysostoma Sowerby, 1834; Murex variegatum sensu Martini Mørch, 1852

= Vokesimurex chrysostoma =

Species of gastropod

Vokesimurex chrysostoma, common name the gold-mouthed murex, is a species of sea snail, a marine gastropod mollusk in the family Muricidae, the murex snails or rock snails.

== Description ==
The size of the shell varies between 35 mm and 80 mm.

In general appearance not unlike Siratus motacilla (Gmelin, 1791), this species presents the following distinctive characters, which appear to be permanent: it is larger, stouter, the siphonal canal is proportionally shorter and straight or but little turned to the right. There are one or two spur-like spines on the varices at the lower part of the aperture: generally on the left-hand varix and sometimes on the back varix, but very seldom on the right hand or lip varix. The lips of the aperture are tinged with more or less brilliant orange color.

== Distribution ==
This marine species occurs from the southern part of the Caribbean Sea to Brazil.
