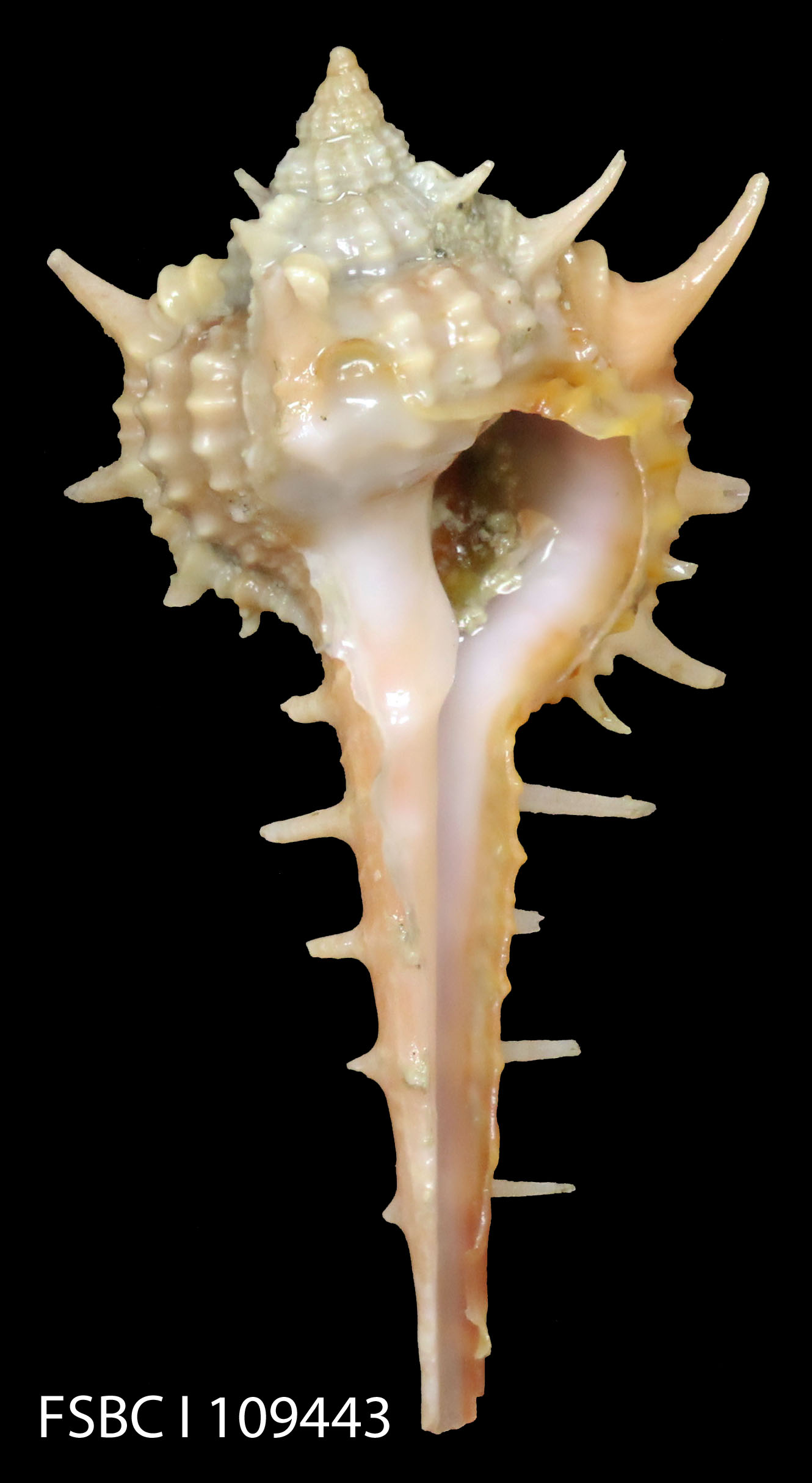
- Shell of Vokesimurex cabritii

Scientific classification
- Kingdom: Animalia
- Phylum: Mollusca
- Class: Gastropoda
- Subclass: Caenogastropoda
- Order: Neogastropoda
- Family: Muricidae
- Subfamily: Muricinae
- Genus: Vokesimurex
- Species: V. cabritii

Binomial name
- Vokesimurex cabritii (Bernardi, 1859)

Synonyms
- Haustellum cabritii (Bernardi, 1859); Murex cabritii Bernardi, 1859

= Vokesimurex cabritii =

Species of gastropod

Vokesimurex cabritii, common name Cabrit's murex, is a species of sea snail, a marine gastropod mollusk in the family Muricidae, the murex snails or rock snails.

== Description ==
The length of the shell varies between 39.5 mm and 66 mm.

The short, thick-set spines extend over the siphonal canal.

This is a fine species, of which the adults are a fine uniform pink, or pinkish white, with no dots or other color markings whatever. They may be luxuriantly spinous, or nearly destitute of spines.

== Distribution ==
This species occurs in the Caribbean Sea and the Gulf of Mexico.
