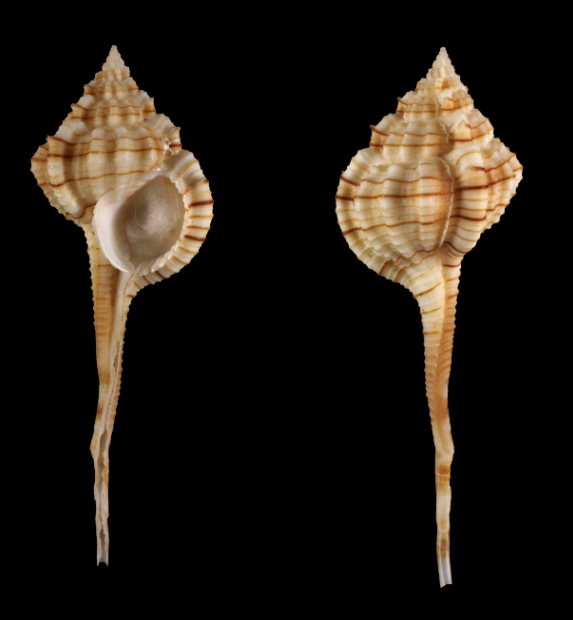
- Shell of Vokesimurex yuhsiuae (paratype at MNHN, Paris)

Scientific classification
- Kingdom: Animalia
- Phylum: Mollusca
- Class: Gastropoda
- Subclass: Caenogastropoda
- Order: Neogastropoda
- Family: Muricidae
- Subfamily: Muricinae
- Genus: Vokesimurex
- Species: V. yuhsiuae

Binomial name
- Vokesimurex yuhsiuae (Clench & Pérez Farfante, 1945)

= Vokesimurex yuhsiuae =

Species of gastropod

Vokesimurex yuhsiuae is a species of sea snail, a marine gastropod mollusk in the family Muricidae, the murex snails or rock snails.

== Distribution ==
This marine species occurs off the Philippines and Vanuatu
