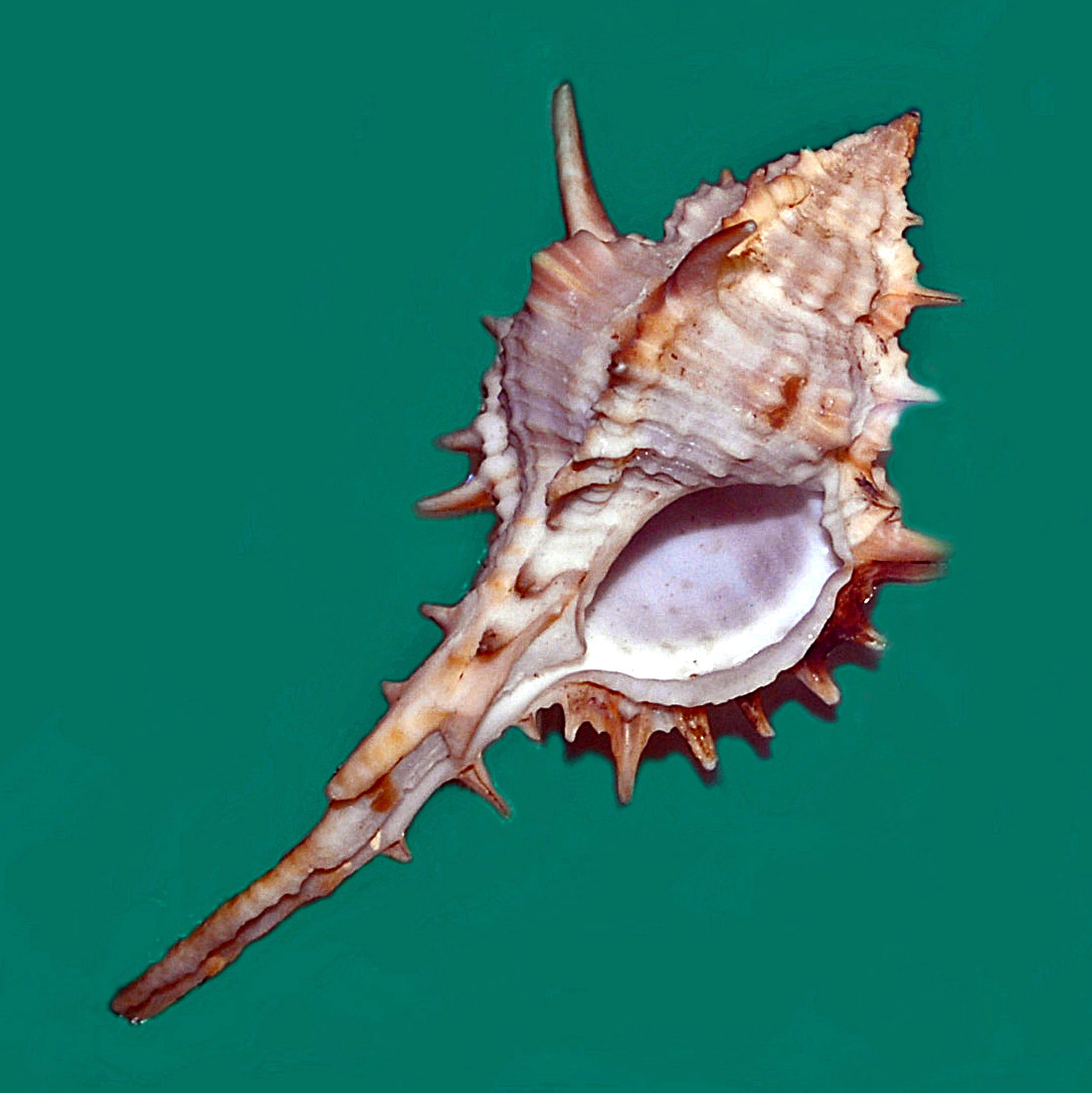
- A shell of Vokesimurex kiiensis

Scientific classification
- Kingdom: Animalia
- Phylum: Mollusca
- Class: Gastropoda
- Subclass: Caenogastropoda
- Order: Neogastropoda
- Family: Muricidae
- Subfamily: Muricinae
- Genus: Vokesimurex
- Species: V. kiiensis

Binomial name
- Vokesimurex kiiensis (Kira, 1959)

Synonyms
- Haustellum kiiensis (Kira, 1959); Murex kiiensis Kira, 1959; Murex kiiensis f. nagaidesu Shikama, 1970

= Vokesimurex kiiensis =

Species of gastropod

Vokesimurex kiiensis, common name Kii murex, is a species of sea snail, a marine gastropod mollusk in the family Muricidae, the murex snails or rock snails.

== Description ==
Shell of Vokesimurex kiiensis can reach a length of 50–100 millimetres (2.0–3.9 in). This species has a conical, multispiral protoconch, short shoulder spines and short, crowded, blunt spines at the base of the siphonal canal.

== Distribution ==
This marine species is present from the Philippines, Indonesia and the East China Sea; from Southern Japan, the Fiji Islands, Papua New Guinea to Queensland, Australia, at depth of about 100 m.; also off Madagascar.
