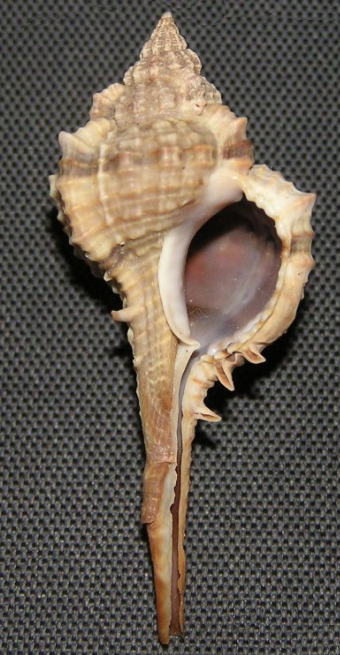
- Two shells of Vokesimurex recurvirostris

Scientific classification
- Kingdom: Animalia
- Phylum: Mollusca
- Class: Gastropoda
- Subclass: Caenogastropoda
- Order: Neogastropoda
- Family: Muricidae
- Subfamily: Muricinae
- Genus: Vokesimurex
- Species: V. recurvirostris

Binomial name
- Vokesimurex recurvirostris (Broderip, 1833)

Synonyms
- Haustellum (Vokesimurex) recurvirostris recurvirostris Broderip, W.J., 1833; Murex nigrescens G. B. Sowerby II, 1841 ·; Murex (Murex) recurvirostris Broderip, 1833; Murex recurvirostris Broderip, 1833; Murex recurvirostris nigrescens G. B. Sowerby II, 1841 junior subjective synonym; Murex recurvirostrus Broderip, 1833 (basionym) (misspelling)

= Vokesimurex recurvirostris =

Species of gastropod

Vokesimurex recurvirostris, common name : the bent-beak murex, is a species of sea snail, a marine gastropod mollusk in the family Muricidae, the murex snails or rock snails.

== Description ==
The shell size varies between 36 mm and 88 mm

This is a comparatively small species, rarely exceeding two inches (5.08 cm) in length. The varices are thick, plait-like and tuberculated by the crossing of elevated lines which also cut the three inter-variceal ribs into tubercles. These tubercles are sometimes developed into short spines, one on the upper part of each varix, and there are also one or two on each varix below the aperture. The color varies from whitish to livid with two or three broad brown bands which are most visible within the aperture.

== Distribution ==
This species occurs in the Pacific Ocean off Mexico to Ecuador.
