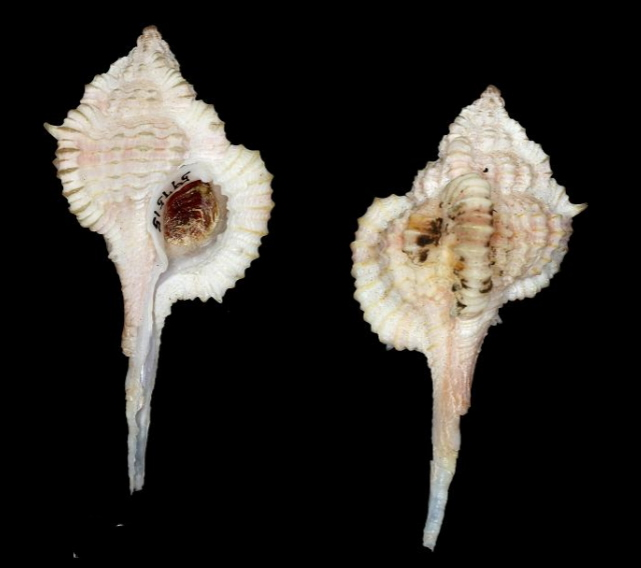
- Shell of Vokesimurex sallasi (holotype at the Smithsonian Institution)

Scientific classification
- Kingdom: Animalia
- Phylum: Mollusca
- Class: Gastropoda
- Subclass: Caenogastropoda
- Order: Neogastropoda
- Family: Muricidae
- Subfamily: Muricinae
- Genus: Vokesimurex
- Species: V. sallasi

Binomial name
- Vokesimurex sallasi (Rehder & Abbott, 1951)

Synonyms
- Haustellum bellegladeensis (E. H. Vokes, 1963); Murex anniae bellegladeensis Vokes, 1963 (original combination); † Murex bellegladeensis E. H. Vokes, 1963; Murex bellegladensis [sic] (misspelling); Murex sallasi Rehder & Abbott, 1951; Murex (Murex) recurvirostris sallasi Rehder & Abbott, 1951; Vokesimurex anniae bellegladeensis (Vokes, 1963); Vokesimurex morrisoni Petuch & Sargent, 2011

= Vokesimurex sallasi =

Species of gastropod

Vokesimurex sallasi is a species of sea snail, a marine gastropod mollusk in the family Muricidae, the murex snails or rock snails.

== Description ==
The length of the shell varies between 38.7 mm and 58 mm.

== Distribution ==
This marine species occurs in the Gulf of Mexico and in the South China Sea.
