= Vokesimurex purdyae =

Scientific classification
- Kingdom: Animalia
- Phylum: Mollusca
- Class: Gastropoda
- Subclass: Caenogastropoda
- Order: Neogastropoda
- Family: Muricidae
- Subfamily: Muricinae
- Genus: Vokesimurex
- Species: V. purdyae

Binomial name
- Vokesimurex purdyae (Radwin & D'Attilio, 1976)

Synonyms
- Haustellum purdyae (Radwin & D'Attilio, 1976); Murex purdyae Radwin & D'Attilio, 1976

Species of gastropod

Vokesimurex purdyae is a species of sea snail, a marine gastropod mollusk in the family Muricidae, the murex snails or rock snails.

== Description ==
The length of the shell varies between 26.5 mm and 61 mm.

== Distribution ==
This marine species occurs off Mozambique and South Africa.
