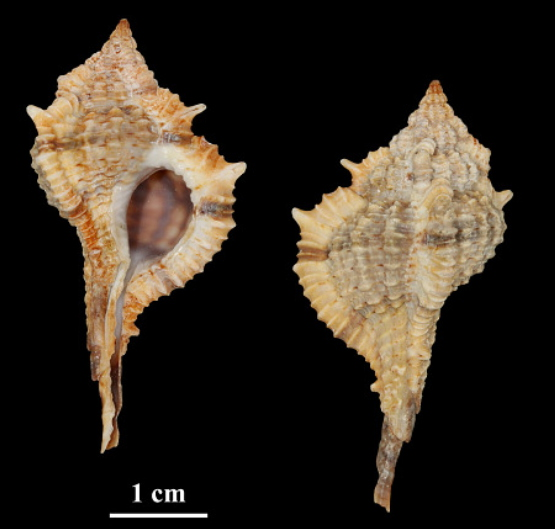
- Shell of Vokesimurex garciai (holotype at the Smithsonian Institution)

Scientific classification
- Kingdom: Animalia
- Phylum: Mollusca
- Class: Gastropoda
- Subclass: Caenogastropoda
- Order: Neogastropoda
- Family: Muricidae
- Genus: Vokesimurex
- Species: V. garciai

Binomial name
- Vokesimurex garciai (Petuch, 1987)

Synonyms
- Haustellum messorius garciai E.J. Petuch, 1987; Murex garciai Petuch, 1987; Vokesimurex woodringi garciai (E.J. Petuch, 1987)

= Vokesimurex garciai =

Species of sea snail

Vokesimurex garciai is a species of small-to-medium sea snail, a predatory marine gastropod in the rock snail family, Muricidae. American malacologist Edward J. Petuch originally named the species Murex garciai in 1987, honoring Dr. Emilio Garcia, who collected the original specimen.

== Description ==
Adult shells of Vokesimurex garciai generally range from 45 mm to 69 mm long.

The shell is sturdy, fairly broad, and features a moderately raised spire with sharp angles along the shoulders. Each whorl has three triangular axial ridges (varices) that slope downward toward a long, straight siphonal canal. Three small, bead-like ribs sit between each varix, crossed by fine spiral lines. While close relatives like Vokesimurex messorius usually sport multiple spines along the siphonal canal, V. garciai is typically distinguished by having just a single main spine.

== Distribution ==
This species is native to the tropical waters of the Caribbean Sea. Confirmed sightings and specimens have been recovered off Roatán Island in Honduras and within the Gulf of Morrosquillo off Colombia, mostly along muddy or sandy seabed substrates at depths around 35 m.
