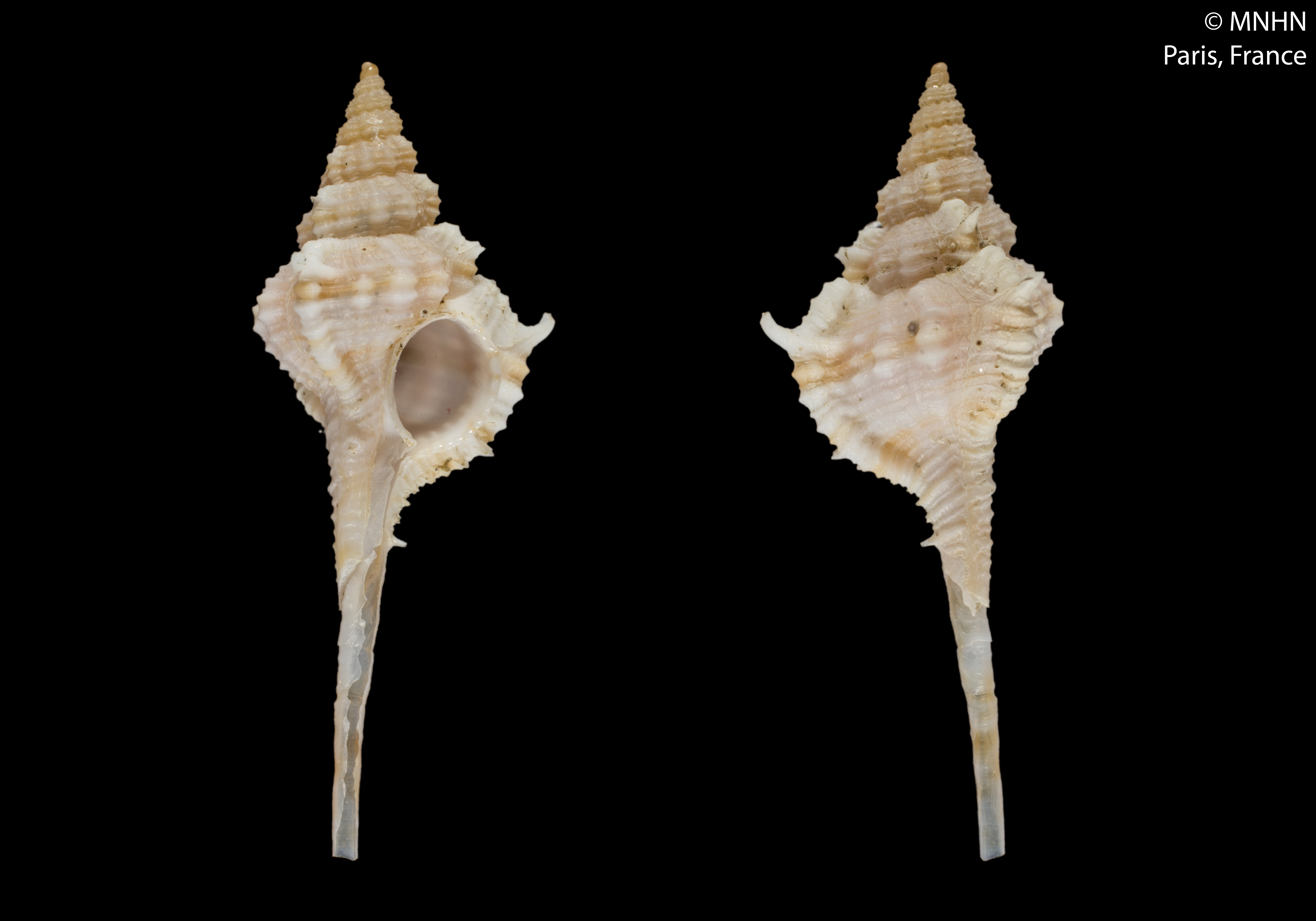
- Shell of Vokesimurex aliquantulus (holotype at MNHN, Paris)

Scientific classification
- Kingdom: Animalia
- Phylum: Mollusca
- Class: Gastropoda
- Subclass: Caenogastropoda
- Order: Neogastropoda
- Family: Muricidae
- Subfamily: Muricinae
- Genus: Vokesimurex
- Species: V. aliquantulus

Binomial name
- Vokesimurex aliquantulus Houart & Héros, 2015

= Vokesimurex aliquantulus =

Species of gastropod

Vokesimurex aliquantulus is a species of sea snail, a marine gastropod mollusk in the family Muricidae, the murex snails or rock snails.

== Distribution ==
This marine species occurs off Madagascar.
