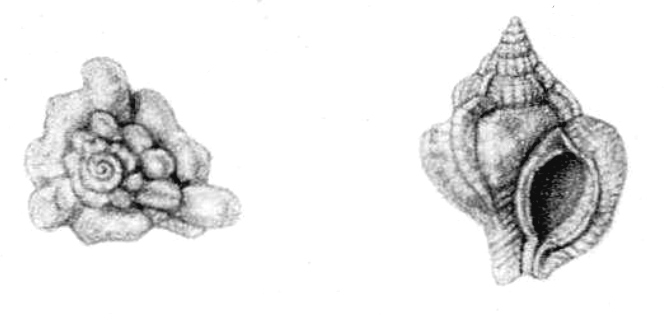
- Shell of † Vokesimurex wanneri (holotype)

Scientific classification
- Kingdom: Animalia
- Phylum: Mollusca
- Class: Gastropoda
- Subclass: Caenogastropoda
- Order: Neogastropoda
- Family: Muricidae
- Subfamily: Muricinae
- Genus: Vokesimurex
- Species: V. wanneri

Binomial name
- Vokesimurex wanneri (K. Martin, 1916)

Synonyms
- † Murex (Haustellum) wanneri K. Martin, 1916

= Vokesimurex wanneri =

Species of gastropod

Vokesimurex wanneri is an extinct species of sea snail, a marine gastropod mollusk in the family Muricidae, the murex snails or rock snails.

== Description ==
The small shell has a club-like shape and a few short whorls. The first whorl is the protoconch, which is single and smooth. The next five whorls form the teleoconch, which has no spiral pattern. They are convex and flat at the back, forming a sharp edge. The older whorls have thin, round ribs across them, with fine spiral striae between them. There are also three ridges and a weaker one below them. The fourth, running along the back edge is the more prominent, and there are some more subtle ones as well. The thickness of the transverse ribs is initially almost the same; only at the body whorl emerges the sculpture of the last whorl clearly. It consists of three very strong highly protruding, rounded varices, between which two transverse ribs are inserted. Between the varices, there are two more ribs, also thick and rounded, that extend to the anterior, stalk-like narrowing the body whorl. The front part of the whorl is also flatter and has a clear spiral pattern that ends at the stalk. The spiral pattern has some gaps in it, where there are two or three finer striae. The aperture is ovoid, with a shallow groove at the back, extending into a long, straight channel at the front. The channel is almost closed at the back end. Inside the aperture one notices a bump on the right side and some short, distant ridges.

== Distribution ==
Fossils of this marine species were found in Miocene strata off Java.

== Bibliography ==
- Merle, D., Landau, B. M. & Breitenberger, A. E. (2021). New Muricidae (Mollusca, Gastropoda) from the Miocene of Java (Indonesia). Basteria. 85 (1): 21–33. Leiden.
