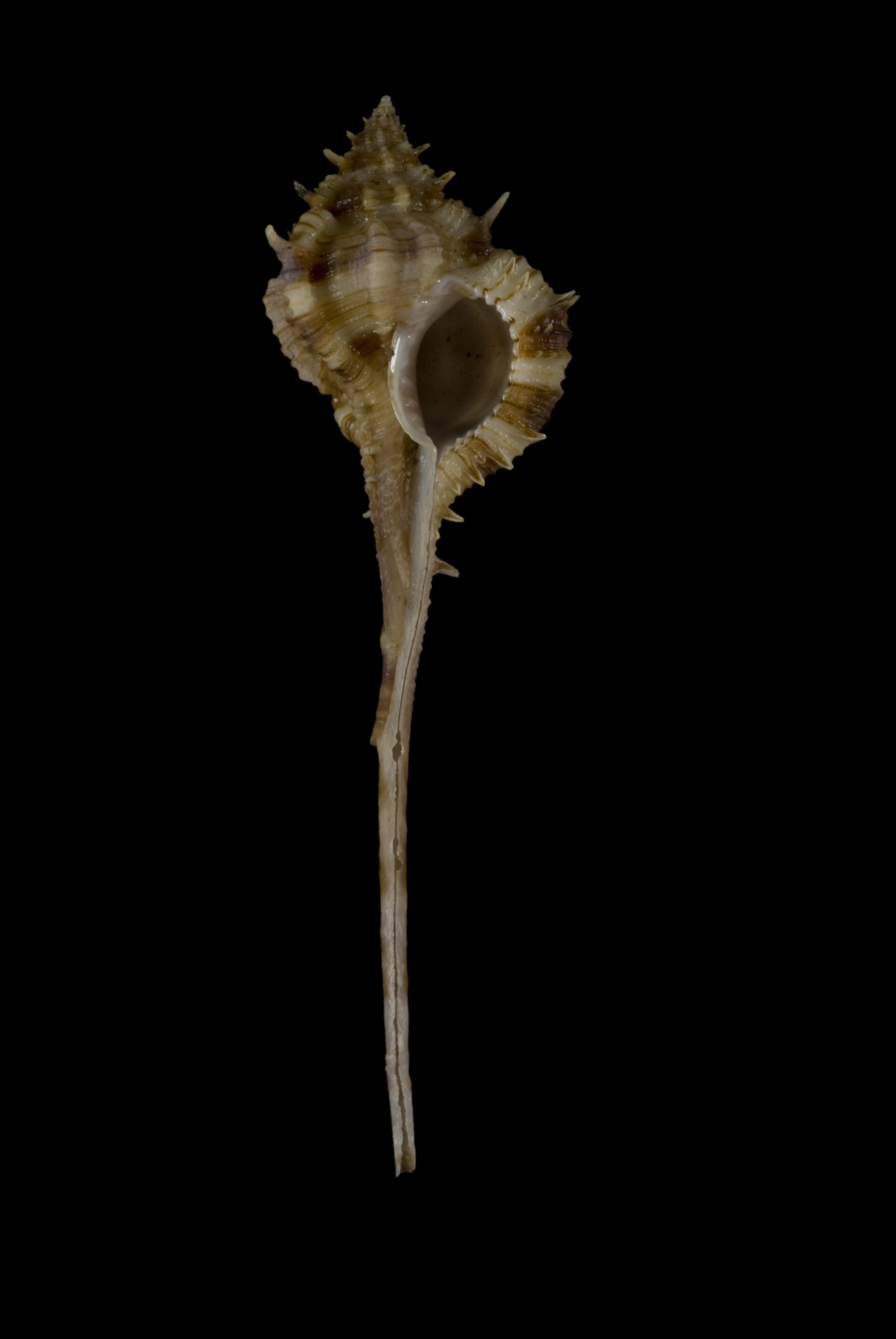
- Shell of Vokesimurex dentifer (specimen at MNHN, Paris)

Scientific classification
- Kingdom: Animalia
- Phylum: Mollusca
- Class: Gastropoda
- Subclass: Caenogastropoda
- Order: Neogastropoda
- Family: Muricidae
- Subfamily: Muricinae
- Genus: Vokesimurex
- Species: V. dentifer

Binomial name
- Vokesimurex dentifer (Watson, 1883)

Synonyms
- Murex dentifer R. B. Watson, 1883

= Vokesimurex dentifer =

Species of gastropod

Vokesimurex dentifer is a species of sea snail, a marine gastropod mollusk in the family Muricidae, the murex snails or rock snails.

Subspecies

- Vokesimurex dentifer coriolis (Houart, 1990) (occurs off the Loyalty Islands and New Caledonia)
- Vokesimurex dentifer dentifer (R. B. Watson, 1883)

== Description ==
The length of the shell varies between 30 mm and 127.5 mm.

(Original description) This is a massive full-grown (?) shell, which in my list I have called Murex dentifer, as a new species, but which is in too bad condition for detailed description.

This species is not unlike in shape to the immature shell of Murex imperialis Swainson, 1831 (synonym of Phyllonotus margaritensis (Abbott, 1958) ), from California; but its siphonal canal seems to have been long and was certainly narrow. It has 3, not 5 varices (which are rounded, high, narrow, and continuous from whorl to whorl), with 4 (or on the last segment 6) biggish rounded ribs between the varices. The old edges of the aperture on the front of the varices are not like saw-teeth, but smooth and continuous. The aperture is small, oval, not large. The outer lip is not internally thickened. And the surface is marked with regular strong spiral threads and with fine regular lines of growth, and is not squamously fine-grained. The outer lip is scored with long, sharpish, but fine teeth. The inner lip is closely set with teeth, which are short and strong on the columella, feeble and a little longer on the body, with a round tubercle at the very top. There is a broad glaze on the body, which separates and stands out as a strong lamina on the columella, with a deep umbilical cleft behind.

== Distribution ==
This marine species occurs off the Philippines and in the East China Sea; also off Fiji, Vanuatu and Papua New Guinea.
