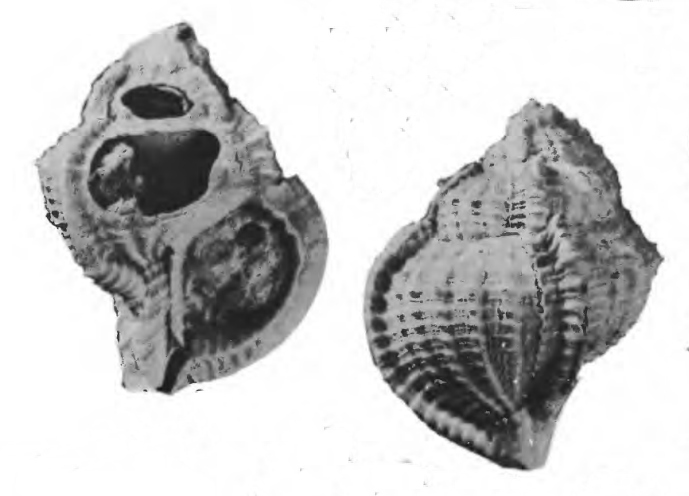
- Shell of Vokesimurex nasongoensis (holotype)

Scientific classification
- Kingdom: Animalia
- Phylum: Mollusca
- Class: Gastropoda
- Subclass: Caenogastropoda
- Order: Neogastropoda
- Family: Muricidae
- Subfamily: Muricinae
- Genus: Vokesimurex
- Species: V. nasongoensis

Binomial name
- Vokesimurex nasongoensis (Ladd, 1977)

Synonyms
- † Murex (Murex) nasongoensis Ladd, 1977

= Vokesimurex nasongoensis =

Species of gastropod

Vokesimurex nasongoensis is an extinct species of sea snail, a marine gastropod mollusk in the family Muricidae, the murex snails or rock snails.

== Description ==
The length of the shell attains 39.1 mm, its diameter 30.7 mm

(Original description) The globose shell is medium in size. The whorls are inflated, separated by a deep suture. The aperture is broadly ovate with a shallow notch posteriorly and a narrow siphonal canal anteriorly that is not completely roofed over. Both inner and outer lips lirate within, the inner lip detached and thickened anteriorly. Each whorl has three varices, those of each whorl aligned with those of the preceding whorl. Low rounded axial ribs are present between varices, five between each two varices on the body whorl. The varices and ribs are overridden by alternating spiral cords and threads.

== Distribution ==
Fossils of this marine species were found in Miocene strata off Fiji.
