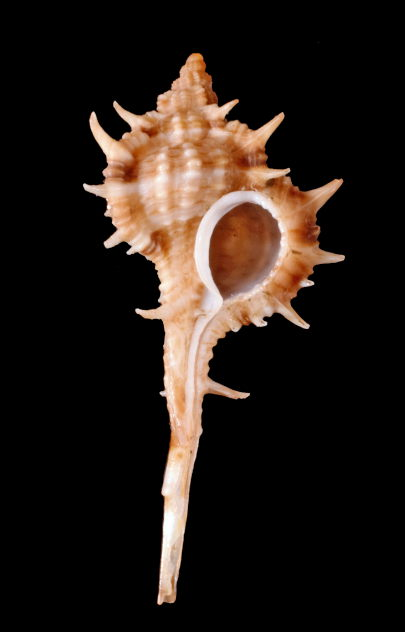
- Shell of Vokesimurex anniae (specimen at MNHN, Paris)

Scientific classification
- Kingdom: Animalia
- Phylum: Mollusca
- Class: Gastropoda
- Subclass: Caenogastropoda
- Order: Neogastropoda
- Family: Muricidae
- Subfamily: Muricinae
- Genus: Vokesimurex
- Species: V. anniae

Binomial name
- Vokesimurex anniae (M. Smith, 1940)

Synonyms
- † Murex anniae M. Smith, 1940 superseded combination; Murex lindajoycae Petuch, 1987; Vokesimurex anniae anniae (M. Smith, 1940); Vokesimurex lindajoycae (Petuch, 1987) ·

= Vokesimurex anniae =

Species of gastropod

Vokesimurex anniae is a species of sea snail, a marine gastropod mollusk in the family Muricidae, the murex snails or rock snails.

== Description ==
A fossil species from the Calabrian Pleistocene Bermont Formation of southern Florida.

The length of the shell varies between 27.6 mm and 97 mm.

== Distribution ==
This marine species occurs in the Caribbean Sea and in the East China Sea.
