= Vokesimurex blakeanus =

Scientific classification
- Kingdom: Animalia
- Phylum: Mollusca
- Class: Gastropoda
- Subclass: Caenogastropoda
- Order: Neogastropoda
- Family: Muricidae
- Subfamily: Muricinae
- Genus: Vokesimurex
- Species: V. blakeanus

Binomial name
- Vokesimurex blakeanus (Vokes, 1967)

Synonyms
- Murex blakeanus Vokes, 1967

Species of gastropod

Vokesimurex blakeanus is a species of sea snail, a marine gastropod mollusk in the family Muricidae, the murex snails or rock snails.

== Description ==
The length of the shell attains 36.9 mm.

== Distribution ==
This marine species occurs off Colombia.
