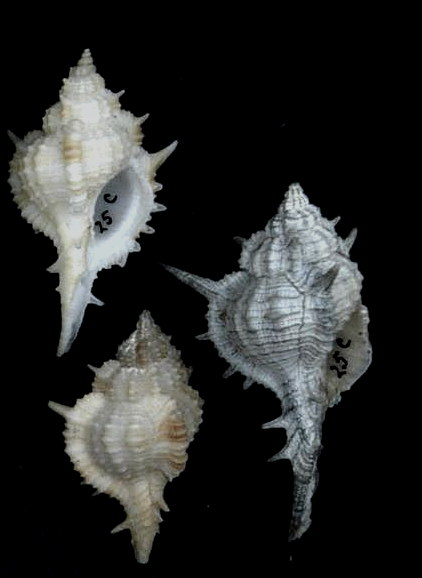
- Three shells of Vokesimurex rubidus (museum specimens at Naturalis Biodiversity Center)

Scientific classification
- Kingdom: Animalia
- Phylum: Mollusca
- Class: Gastropoda
- Subclass: Caenogastropoda
- Order: Neogastropoda
- Family: Muricidae
- Subfamily: Muricinae
- Genus: Vokesimurex
- Species: V. rubidus

Binomial name
- Vokesimurex rubidus (F. C. Baker, 1897)

Synonyms
- Haustellum (Vokesimurex) recurvirostris rubidus Baker, F.C., 1897; Haustellum (Vokesimurex) rubidum (Baker, F.C., 1897); Murex citrinus M. Smith, 1940; Murex cracherodi G. B. Sowerby II, 1879 (nomen nudum); Murex delicatus M. Smith, 1940; Murex marcoensis Sowerby, 1900; Murex messorius var. rubidus F. C. Baker, 1897 (basionym); Murex panamicus Petuch, 1990; Murex recurvirostris rubidus F. C. Baker, 1897; Murex recurvirostris var. citrinus M. Smith, 1940; Murex recurvirostris var. delicatus M. Smith, 1940; Murex rubidus F.C. Baker, 1897; Murex rubidus panamicus Petuch, 1990; Vokesimurex rubidus panamicus (Petuch, 1990); Vokesimurex rubidus rubidus (F. C. Baker, 1897)

= Vokesimurex rubidus =

Species of gastropod

Vokesimurex rubidus, common name : the rose murex, is a species of sea snail, a marine gastropod mollusk in the family Muricidae, the murex snails or rock snails.

== Description ==
The length of the shell varies between 28 mm and 68 mm.

== Distribution ==
This species occurs in the Gulf of Mexico, off Florida and in the Atlantic Ocean off North Carolina, the Bahamas, and Brazil.
