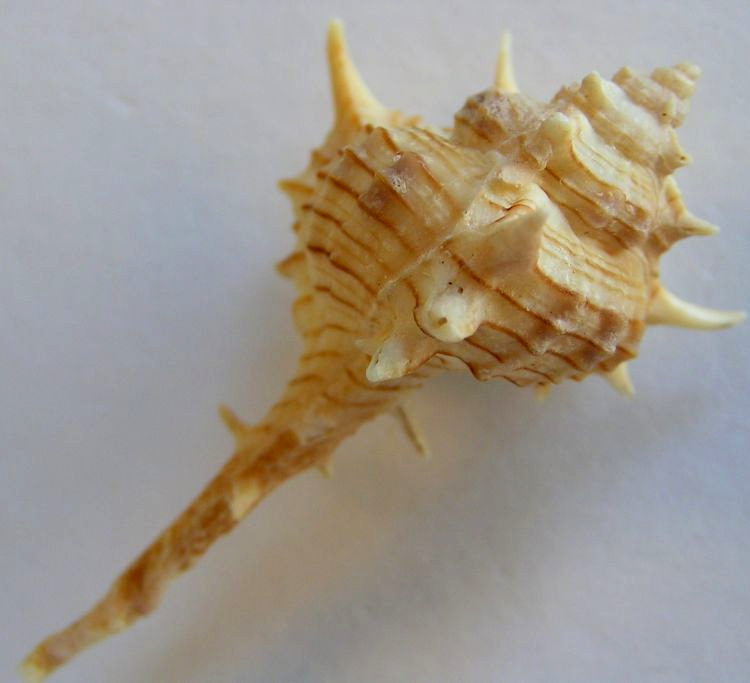
- Shell of Vokesimurex tricoronis

Scientific classification
- Kingdom: Animalia
- Phylum: Mollusca
- Class: Gastropoda
- Subclass: Caenogastropoda
- Order: Neogastropoda
- Family: Muricidae
- Genus: Vokesimurex
- Species: V. tricoronis

Binomial name
- Vokesimurex tricoronis (Berry, 1960)

Synonyms
- Murex (Murex) tricoronis S. S. Berry, 1960; Murex tricoronis S. S. Berry, 1960

= Vokesimurex tricoronis =

Species of gastropod

Vokesimurex tricoronis is a species of sea snail, a marine gastropod mollusk in the family Muricidae, the murex snails or rock snails.

== Description ==
The shell attains a length of 54.2 mm.

== Distribution ==
This marine species occurs off Cedros Island, Mexico.
