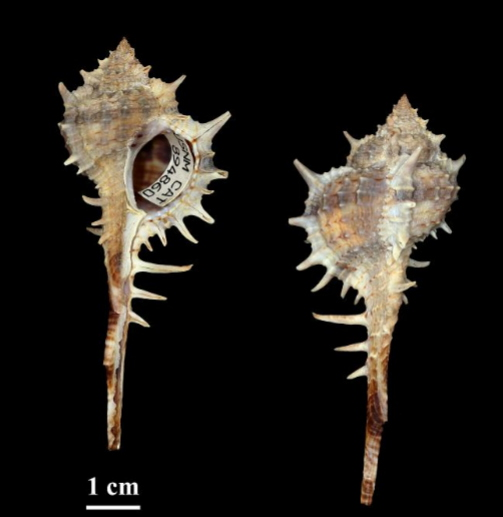
- Shell of Vokesimurex bayeri (holotype at the Smithsonian Institution)

Scientific classification
- Kingdom: Animalia
- Phylum: Mollusca
- Class: Gastropoda
- Subclass: Caenogastropoda
- Order: Neogastropoda
- Family: Muricidae
- Genus: Vokesimurex
- Species: V. bayeri

Binomial name
- Vokesimurex bayeri Petuch, 2001

= Vokesimurex bayeri =

Species of gastropod

Vokesimurex bayeri is a species of sea snail, a marine gastropod mollusk in the family Muricidae, the murex snails or rock snails.

== Distribution ==
This marine species occurs in the Caribbean Sea, Gulf of Morrosquillo at a depth of 35 m.
