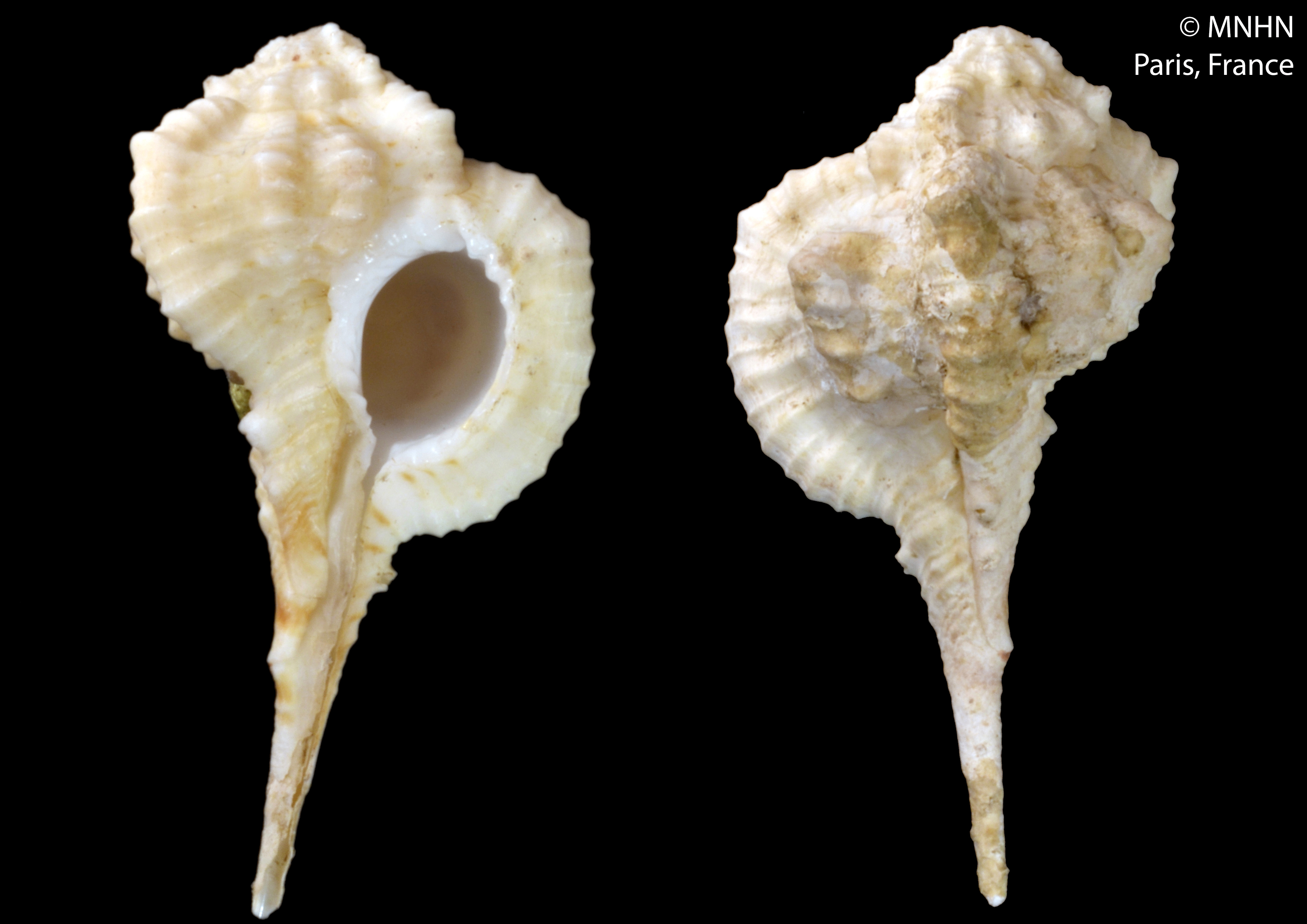
- shell of Vokesimurex messorius (museum specimens at MNHN, Paris)

Scientific classification
- Kingdom: Animalia
- Phylum: Mollusca
- Class: Gastropoda
- Subclass: Caenogastropoda
- Order: Neogastropoda
- Family: Muricidae
- Genus: Vokesimurex
- Species: V. messorius

Binomial name
- Vokesimurex messorius (G.B. Sowerby II, 1841)

Synonyms
- Murex funiculatus Reeve, 1845; Murex messorius Sowerby II, 1841; Murex samui Sunderland, 2003; Murex sutilis C. A. White, 1887

= Vokesimurex messorius =

Species of gastropod

Vokesimurex messorius, common name the Mesorius murex, is a species of sea snail, a marine gastropod mollusk in the family Muricidae, the murex snails or rock snails.

Subspecies

- Murex messorius gustaviensis Nowell-Usticke, G.W., 1969: synonym of Vokesimurex woodringi (Clench & Pérez Farfante, 1945)

== Description ==
The size of the shell varies between 43 mm and 90 mm.

(Described as Murex sutilis C. A. White, 1887) The shell is rather small. The body is subglobose. The spire is about equal in height to the breadth of the body portion of the last whorl, exclusive of the aperture. There are three principal varices to each whorl. They are strong, prominent, laterally reflexed, crenulated, and bearing a few slender spines upon their edges, which are arranged in three continuous rows from the apex to the base of the beak. The spaces between the rows of principal varices are each traversed by three or four distinct but slightly raised, secondary varices, and also by numerous revolving raised lines, which are continuous with the crenulations of the varices. The beak is long and slender, its length equal to rather more than two-fifths the full length of the shell from the apex to the point of the beak. The aperture is suboval, a little longer than wide. The length from the apex to the point of the beak is 38 millimeters. The greatest transverse diameter, including two of the varice is, 17 millimeters.

== Distribution ==
This species occurs in the Caribbean Sea off Honduras to Suriname and French Guiana; and off St Lucia and Saint Vincent (Antilles), Martinique and Guadeloupe.
