= Vokesimurex danilai =

Scientific classification
- Kingdom: Animalia
- Phylum: Mollusca
- Class: Gastropoda
- Subclass: Caenogastropoda
- Order: Neogastropoda
- Family: Muricidae
- Genus: Vokesimurex
- Species: V. danilai

Binomial name
- Vokesimurex danilai (Houart, 1992)

Synonyms
- Haustellum danilai Houart, 1992

Species of gastropod

Vokesimurex danilai is a species of sea snail, a marine gastropod mollusk in the family Muricidae, the murex snails or rock snails.

== Distribution ==
This marine species occurs off the Mascarene Islands.
