= Vokesimurex parkrynieensis =

Scientific classification
- Kingdom: Animalia
- Phylum: Mollusca
- Class: Gastropoda
- Subclass: Caenogastropoda
- Order: Neogastropoda
- Family: Muricidae
- Genus: Vokesimurex
- Species: V. parkrynieensis

Binomial name
- Vokesimurex parkrynieensis S. G. Veldsman & J. H. Veldsman, 2021

Species of gastropod

Vokesimurex parkrynieensis is a species of sea snail, a marine gastropod mollusk in the family Muricidae, the murex snails or rock snails.

== Distribution ==
This marine species occurs off KwaZulu-Natal, South Africa.
