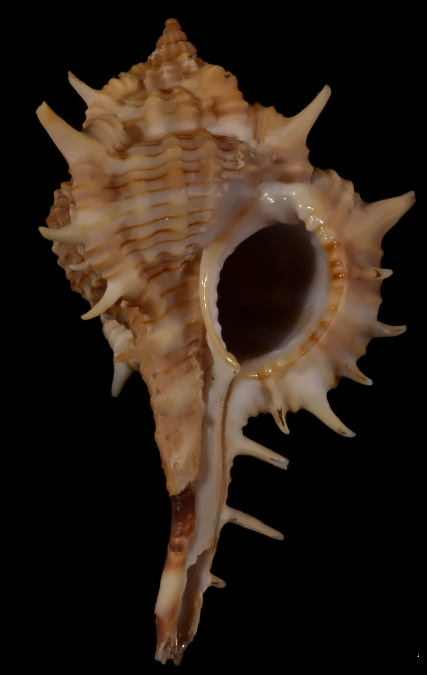
- Shell of Vokesimurex donmoorei (specimen at MNHN, Paris)

Scientific classification
- Kingdom: Animalia
- Phylum: Mollusca
- Class: Gastropoda
- Subclass: Caenogastropoda
- Order: Neogastropoda
- Family: Muricidae
- Genus: Vokesimurex
- Species: V. donmoorei

Binomial name
- Vokesimurex donmoorei (Bullis, 1964)

Synonyms
- Murex (Murex) donmoorei Bullis, 1964

= Vokesimurex donmoorei =

Species of gastropod

Vokesimurex donmoorei is a species of sea snail, a marine gastropod mollusk in the family Muricidae, the murex snails or rock snails.

== Description ==
This spiny species varies between 45 mm and 76 mm.

== Distribution ==
Caribbean Sea, Colombia and North coast of South America (French Guyana).
