= Vokesimurex bobyini =

Scientific classification
- Kingdom: Animalia
- Phylum: Mollusca
- Class: Gastropoda
- Subclass: Caenogastropoda
- Order: Neogastropoda
- Family: Muricidae
- Genus: Vokesimurex
- Species: V. bobyini

Binomial name
- Vokesimurex bobyini (Kosuge, 1983)

Synonyms
- Haustellum bobyini (Kosuge, 1983) ·; Murex bobyini Kosuge, 1983

Species of gastropod

Vokesimurex bobyini is a species of sea snail, a marine gastropod mollusk in the family Muricidae, the murex snails or rock snails.

== Description ==
The length of the shell attains 61 mm.

== Distribution ==
This marine species occurs in the Philippines.
