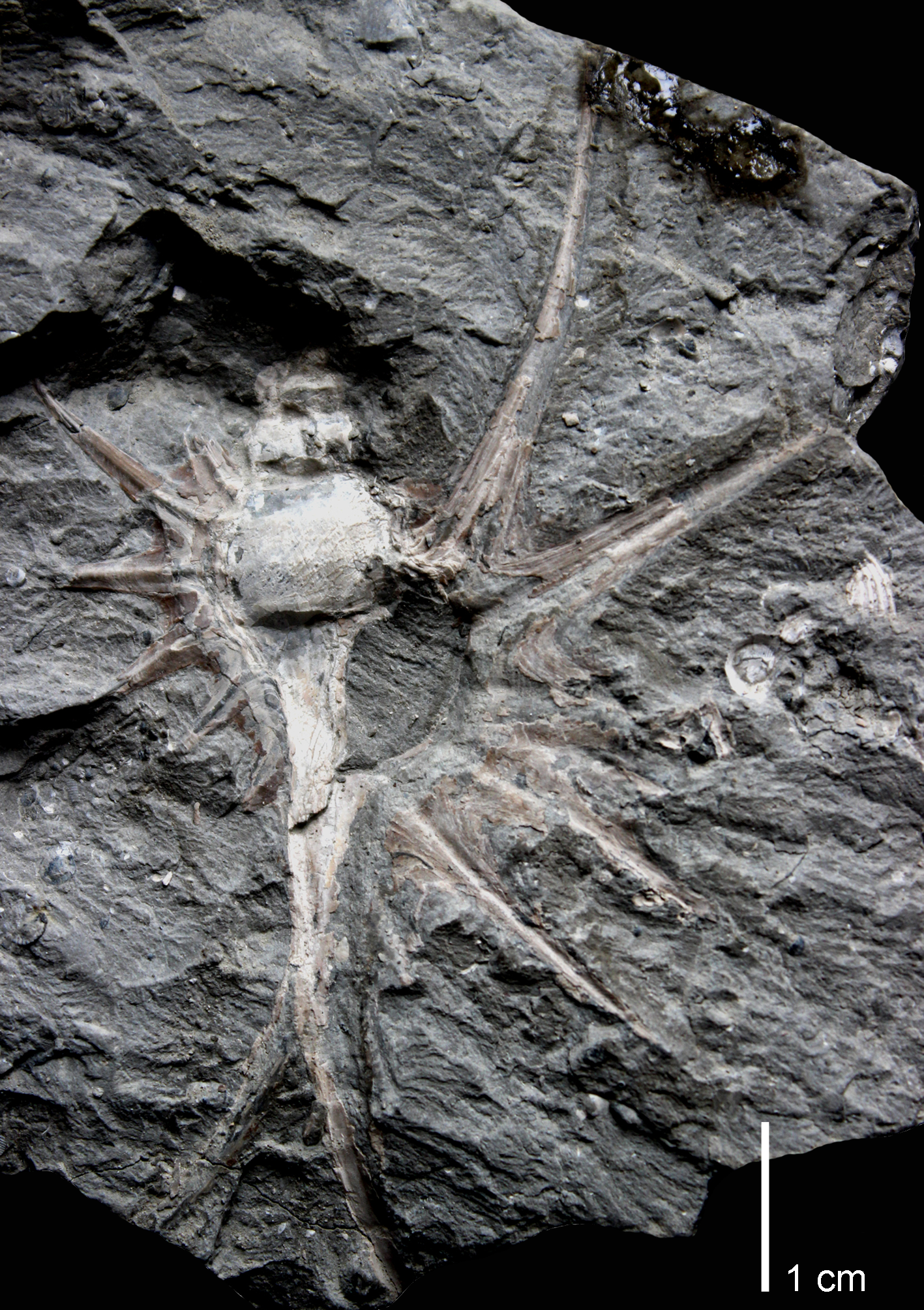
- Harmatia tokodensis Kovács and Vicián, 2020. Size: 72 mm. Upper Lutetian–Lower Bartonian grey marl (Eocene), Tokod (Hungary). Hungarian Natural History Museum

Scientific classification
- Domain: Eukaryota
- Kingdom: Animalia
- Phylum: Mollusca
- Class: Gastropoda
- Subclass: Caenogastropoda
- Order: Neogastropoda
- Superfamily: Muricoidea
- Family: Muricidae
- Genus: †Harmatia; Noszky, 1940

Synonyms
- † Murex (Harmatia) Noszky, 1940

= Harmatia =

Extinct genus of sea snails

Harmatia is an extinct genus of sea snails, marine gastropod mollusks, in the subfamily Muricinae, the murex snails or rock snails.

== Etymology ==
The taxon was named after István Harmat, Hungarian mine manager, fossil shell collector, friend of the author, Jenő Noszky Sr. (1880–1951), Hungarian geologist, paleontologist.

== Description ==
Harmatia species are characterized by medium-sized, subfusiform shell, rounded spire whorls, long, narrow, slightly curved siphonal canal without cord spines, penultimate siphonal canal present, narrow primary spiral cords, three spiny varices per whorl, six long spines on the last whorl.

== Distribution ==
This genus is known in the fossil record from the Middle Eocene – Early Oligocene period. Fossil shells within this genus have been found in Austria and Hungary.

== Species ==
Species included in the genus:

- H. stephani Noszky, 1940. Type species. Early Oligocene, Hungary
- H. guembeli guembeli (Dreger, 1892). Early Oligocene, Austria
- H. guembeli longispina (Noszky, 1940). Early Oligocene, Hungary
- H. tokodensis Kovács & Vicián, 2020. Middle–Late Eocene, Hungary
