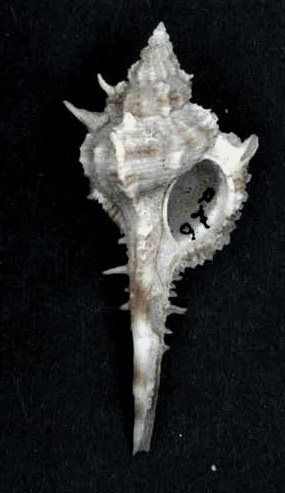
- Shell of Vokesimurex malabaricus (museum specimen: Naturalis Biodiversity Center)

Scientific classification
- Kingdom: Animalia
- Phylum: Mollusca
- Class: Gastropoda
- Subclass: Caenogastropoda
- Order: Neogastropoda
- Superfamily: Muricoidea
- Family: Muricidae
- Subfamily: Muricinae
- Genus: Vokesimurex; Petuch, 1994

Type species
- Murex messorius Sowerby II, 1841

= Vokesimurex =

Genus of gastropods

Vokesimurex is a genus of sea snails, marine gastropod mollusks in the family Muricidae, the murex snails or rock snails.

== Species ==
Species within the genus Vokesimurex include:

- Vokesimurex aliquantulus Houart & Héros, 2015
- Vokesimurex anniae (M. Smith, 1940)
- Vokesimurex bayeri Petuch, 2001
- Vokesimurex bazarutensis S. G. Veldsman & J. H. Veldsman, 2021
- Vokesimurex blakeanus (Vokes, 1967)
- Vokesimurex bobyini (Kosuge, 1983)
- Vokesimurex cabritii (Bernardi, 1859)
- Vokesimurex chrysostoma (G.B. Sowerby II, 1834)
- † Vokesimurex coulsoni (Ladd, 1977)
- Vokesimurex danilai (Houart, 1992)
- Vokesimurex dentifer (Watson, 1883)
- Vokesimurex dolichourus (Ponder & Vokes, 1988)
- Vokesimurex donmoorei (Bullis, 1964)
- Vokesimurex elenensis (Dall, 1909)
- Vokesimurex gallinago (G.B. Sowerby III, 1903)
- Vokesimurex garciai (Petuch, 1987)
- Vokesimurex hamanni (Myers & Hertz, 1994)
- Vokesimurex hirasei (Dautzenberg, 1915)
- Vokesimurex kiiensis (Kira, 1959)
- Vokesimurex lividus (Carpenter, 1857)
- Vokesimurex malabaricus (E. A. Smith, 1894)
- Vokesimurex messorius (G.B. Sowerby II, 1841)
- Vokesimurex micropurdyae Houart & Rosado, 2018
- Vokesimurex mindanaoensis (G.B. Sowerby II, 1841)
- Vokesimurex multiplicatus (G.B. Sowerby III, 1895)
- † Vokesimurex nasongoensis (Ladd, 1977)
- Vokesimurex olssoni (Vokes, 1967)
- Vokesimurex parkrynieensis S. G. Veldsman & J. H. Veldsman, 2021
- Vokesimurex purdyae (Radwin & D'Attilio, 1976)
- Vokesimurex rectaspira Houart & Héros, 2015
- Vokesimurex rectirostris (G.B. Sowerby II, 1841)
- Vokesimurex recurvirostris (Broderip, 1833)
- Vokesimurex rubidus (F. C. Baker, 1897)
- Vokesimurex ruthae (Vokes, 1988)
- Vokesimurex sallasi (Rehder & Abbott, 1951)
- Vokesimurex samui (Petuch, 1987)
- Vokesimurex sobrinus (A. Adams, 1863)
- Vokesimurex tricoronis (Berry, 1960)
- Vokesimurex tryoni (Hidalgo in Tryon, 1880)
- † Vokesimurex wanneri (K. Martin, 1916)
- Vokesimurex woodringi (Clench & Pérez Farfante, 1945)
- Vokesimurex yuhsiuae Houart, 2014

Species brought into synonymy

- Vokesimurex bellegladeensis (E. H. Vokes, 1963): synonym of Vokesimurex sallasi (Rehder & Abbott, 1951) (junior subjective synonym)
- Vokesimurex bellus (Reeve, 1845): synonym of Vokesimurex chrysostoma (G. B. Sowerby II, 1834)
- Vokesimurex coriolis (Houart, 1990): synonym of Vokesimurex dentifer coriolis (Houart, 1990) represented as Vokesimurex dentifer (Watson, 1883)
- Vokesimurex lindajoycae (Petuch, 1987): synonym of Vokesimurex anniae (M. Smith, 1940)
- Vokesimurex morrisoni Petuch & Sargent, 2011: synonym of Vokesimurex bellegladeensis (E. H. Vokes, 1963)
- Vokesimurex tweedianus (Macpherson, 1962): synonym of Haustellum tweedianum (Macpherson, 1962)
