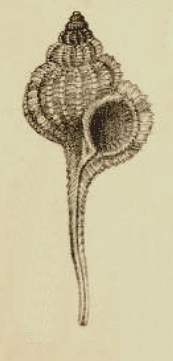
- Shell of Vokesimurex multiplicatus (original drawing)

Scientific classification
- Kingdom: Animalia
- Phylum: Mollusca
- Class: Gastropoda
- Subclass: Caenogastropoda
- Order: Neogastropoda
- Family: Muricidae
- Genus: Vokesimurex
- Species: V. multiplicatus

Binomial name
- Vokesimurex multiplicatus (G.B. Sowerby, 1895)

Synonyms
- Haustellum multiplicatus (G.B. Sowerby III, 1895); Murex multiplicatus G.B. Sowerby III, 1895 (basionym)

= Vokesimurex multiplicatus =

Species of gastropod

Vokesimurex multiplicatus is a species of sea snail, a marine gastropod mollusk in the family Muricidae, the murex snails or rock snails.

There are two subspecies:

- † Vokesimurex multiplicatus bantamensis (Martin, 1895) (synonyms: Murex (Haustellum) bantamensis (Martin, 1895); Murex (Haustellum) bantamensis var. oostinghi Wissema, 1947; Murex bantamensis Martin, 1895)
- † Vokesimurex multiplicatus darraghi (Ludbrook, 1978)
- Vokesimurex multiplicatus multiplicatus (G.B. Sowerby III, 1895): common name: multiplicate snipe's bill, (synonym: † Murex embryoliratus P.J. Fischer, 1927; Murex eximius Brazier, 1877 (invalid: junior homonym of Murex eximius Bellardi, 1872) )

== Description ==
The size of the shell varies between 30 mm and 80 mm.

== Distribution ==
This marine species occurs mainly off Australia (Northern Territory, Queensland, Western Australia), but has also been found off Papua New Guinea, the Moluccas and Java.
