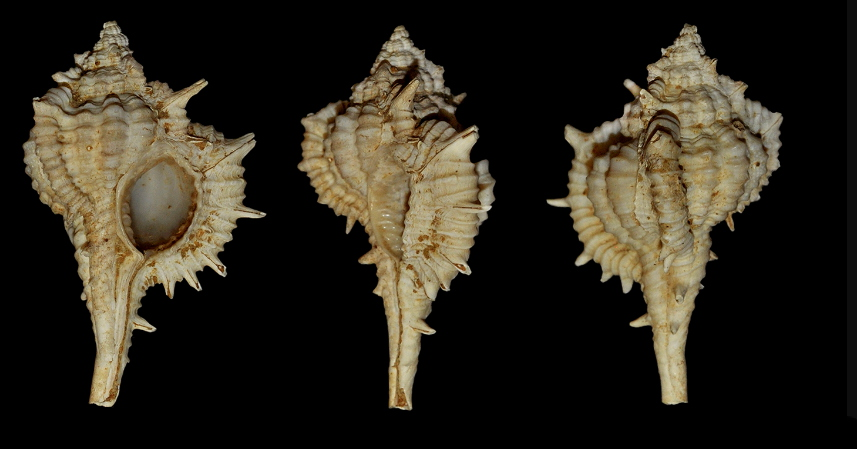
- Shell of Vokesimurex olssoni (fossil specimen at MNHN, Paris)

Scientific classification
- Kingdom: Animalia
- Phylum: Mollusca
- Class: Gastropoda
- Subclass: Caenogastropoda
- Order: Neogastropoda
- Family: Muricidae
- Genus: Vokesimurex
- Species: V. olssoni

Binomial name
- Vokesimurex olssoni (Vokes, 1967)

Synonyms
- Murex olssoni Vokes, 1967

= Vokesimurex olssoni =

Species of gastropod

Vokesimurex olssoni is a species of sea snail, a marine gastropod mollusk in the family Muricidae, the murex snails or rock snails.

== Description ==
The length of the shell varies between 25.7 mm and 62 mm.

== Distribution ==
This marine species occurs in the Caribbean Sea.

Fossils of this species were found in Pleistocene strata in Costa Rica.
