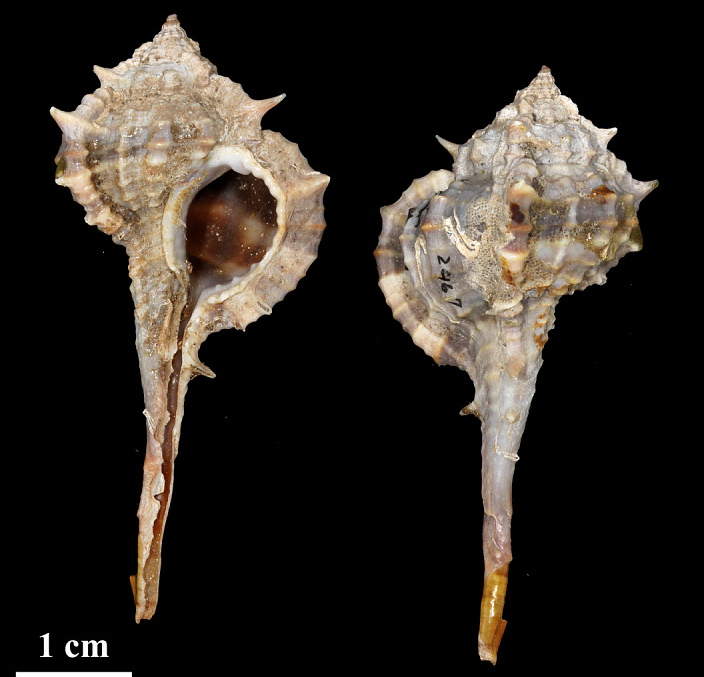
- Shell of Vokesimurex lividus (syntype at the Smithsonian Institution)

Scientific classification
- Kingdom: Animalia
- Phylum: Mollusca
- Class: Gastropoda
- Subclass: Caenogastropoda
- Order: Neogastropoda
- Family: Muricidae
- Genus: Vokesimurex
- Species: V. lividus

Binomial name
- Vokesimurex lividus (Carpenter, 1857)

Synonyms
- Haustellum recurvirostris lividus (P. P. Carpenter, 1857); Murex lividus Carpenter, 1857 (basionym); Murex recurvirostris var. lividus P. P. Carpenter, 1857

= Vokesimurex lividus =

Species of gastropod

Vokesimurex lividus is a species of sea snail, a marine gastropod mollusk in the family Muricidae, the murex snails or rock snails.

== Description ==
The length of the shell varies between 47 mm and 66 mm.

== Distribution ==
This species occurs in the Pacific Ocean off Baja California and Panama.
