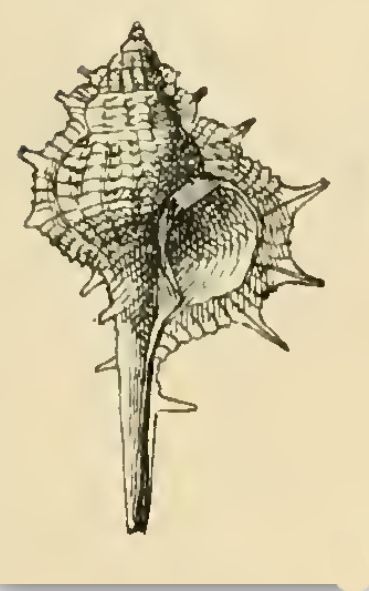
- Drawing of a shell of Vokesimurex tryoni (holotype)

Scientific classification
- Kingdom: Animalia
- Phylum: Mollusca
- Class: Gastropoda
- Subclass: Caenogastropoda
- Order: Neogastropoda
- Family: Muricidae
- Genus: Vokesimurex
- Species: V. tryoni

Binomial name
- Vokesimurex tryoni (Hidalgo in Tryon, 1880)

Synonyms
- Murex sunderlandi Petuch, 1987; Murex (Tribulus) tryoni Hidalgo in Tryon, 1880

= Vokesimurex tryoni =

Species of gastropod

Vokesimurex tryoni is a species of sea snail, a marine gastropod mollusk in the family Muricidae, the murex snails or rock snails.

== Description ==
The length of the shell attains 28 mm.

(Original description) The shell shows three compressed varices. Those of the body whorl contain three short, sharp spines; on the spire there is a single spine upon each. There is a spine on the siphonal canal below each varix. The siphonal canal is moderate in length and is straight. The shell contains seven whorls, the two first smooth, the others with eight or nine very small, narrow longitudinal ribs crossed by numerous revolving lines forming tubercles at the intersections. The color of the shell is whitish.

== Distribution ==
This marine species occurs off Florida and the Lesser Antilles.
