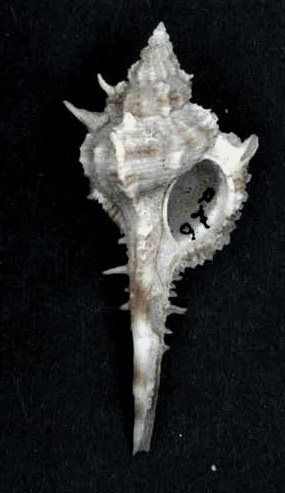
- Shell of Vokesimurex malabaricus (museum specimen Naturalis Biodiversity Center)

Scientific classification
- Kingdom: Animalia
- Phylum: Mollusca
- Class: Gastropoda
- Subclass: Caenogastropoda
- Order: Neogastropoda
- Family: Muricidae
- Subfamily: Muricinae
- Genus: Vokesimurex
- Species: V. malabaricus

Binomial name
- Vokesimurex malabaricus (E. A. Smith, 1894)

Synonyms
- Haustellum malabaricum (E. A. Smith, 1894); Murex (Murex) tunghaiensis Shikama & Oishi, 1977; Murex malabaricus E. A. Smith, 1894 Murex tunghaiensis Shikama & Oishi in Shikama, 1977 (basionym); Murex tunghaiensis Shikama & Oishi in Shikama, 197

= Vokesimurex malabaricus =

Species of gastropod

Vokesimurex malabaricus is a species of sea snail, a marine gastropod mollusk in the family Muricidae, the murex snails or rock snails.

== Description ==
The shell of an adult specimen grows to a length of 106.1 mm.

(Original description) This handsome species is well characterized by its form, the style of coloration, and sculpture. The recurved hollow spine upon the varices about the middle of the upper whorls is a prominent feature in the ornamentation.

The ventricose, fusiform shell contains 9-10 slightly convex whorls. The longitudinal slender ribs, which are nodulous where certain of the transverse lirae cross them, increase in number with the growth of the shell. In the body whorl there are about six in the space between any two varices, five to four on the penultimate, four to three on the preceding volution, two and then only one upon the uppermost whorls.

The transverse colour-bands, when examined closely, are found to consist of groups of coloured lirae.

== Distribution ==
This marine species can be found in the Persian Gulf and in the Pacific Ocean along Indonesia.
