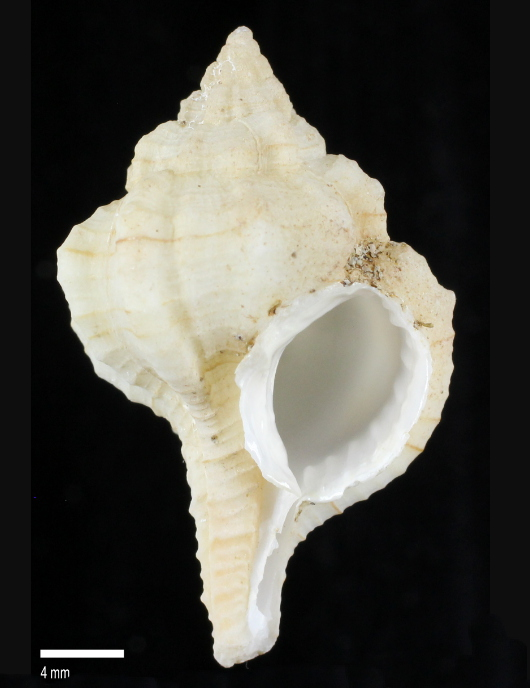
- Shell of Vokesimurex hirasei (specimen at MNHN, Paris)

Scientific classification
- Kingdom: Animalia
- Phylum: Mollusca
- Class: Gastropoda
- Subclass: Caenogastropoda
- Order: Neogastropoda
- Family: Muricidae
- Genus: Vokesimurex
- Species: V. hirasei

Binomial name
- Vokesimurex hirasei (Dautzenberg, 1915)

Synonyms
- Haustellum hirasei (Dautzenberg, 1915); Murex hirasei Dautzenberg (ms) in Hirase, 1915

= Vokesimurex hirasei =

Species of gastropod

Vokesimurex hirasei, colloquially Hirase's Murex, is a species of sea snail, a marine gastropod mollusk in the family Muricidae.

== Description ==
The Vokesimurex hirasei measures approximately 72.1mm in body length, weighing about 40.4 grams. The length of its shell varies between 60 mm and 124 mm. Said shells are easily identifiable by their "multispiral, conical protoconch."

== Discovery ==
The Murex hirasei Dautzenburg was originally discovered in 1915 by Philippe Dautzenburg. The species was named after conchologist Yoichirō Hirase in honor of his work, The Illustrations of a Thousand Shells. However, its genus was soon changed to Vokesimurex.

== Distribution ==
The species inhabits regions in Asian and Oceania, including the Philippines, East China Sea, Taiwan, Japan, Fiji, Tonga Islands, Vanuatu, and New Caledonia.

Typically, Vokesimurex hirasei live within deeper bodies of water (typically between 237 to 335 meters), where temperatures measure around 20 to 30°C (68°F to 86°F). They prefer sea surface salinities of 35-40 PSU.
