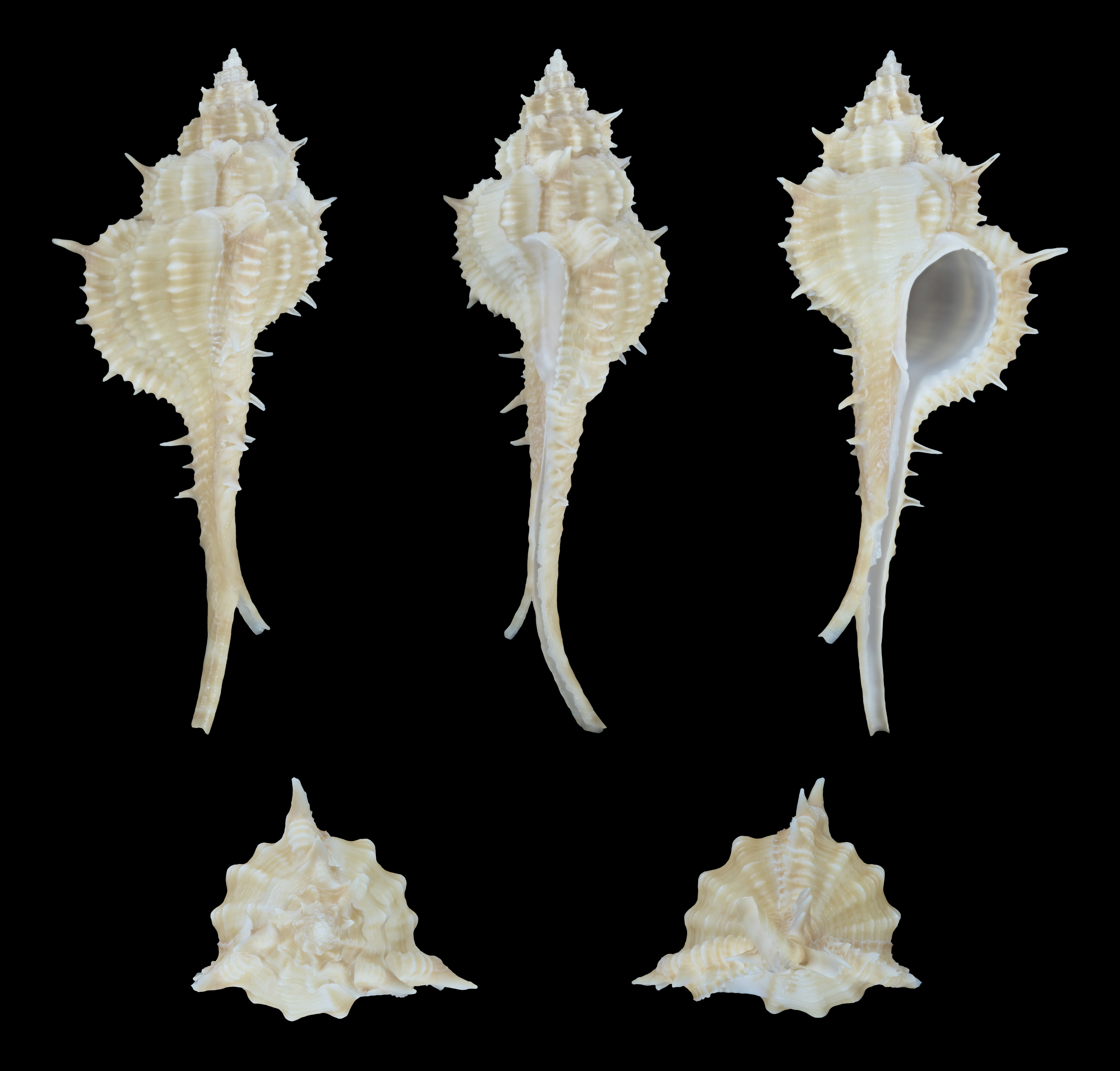
- A shell of Vokesimurex mindanaoensis

Scientific classification
- Kingdom: Animalia
- Phylum: Mollusca
- Class: Gastropoda
- Subclass: Caenogastropoda
- Order: Neogastropoda
- Family: Muricidae
- Genus: Vokesimurex
- Species: V. mindanaoensis

Binomial name
- Vokesimurex mindanaoensis (G.B. Sowerby II, 1841)

Synonyms
- Haustellum mindanaoensis (G. B. Sowerby II, 1841); † Murex (Haustellum) bantamensis teschi Koperberg, 1931 ·; Murex mindinaoensis Sowerby II, 1841 (original combination); Murex serratospinosus Dunker, 1883

= Vokesimurex mindanaoensis =

Species of gastropod

Vokesimurex mindanaoensis (also known as Mindanao murex and Malabar murex) is a species of sea snail, a marine gastropod mollusk in the family Muricidae, the murex snails or rock snails.

== Description ==
The size of the shell varies between 56 mm and 114 mm (2.205 inches and 5.669 inches).

It is distinguishable by its high spire with short shoulder spines, its numerous short spines on the broad, rounded varices of the last whorl, and its almost spineless, long siphonal canal.

== Life Cycle and Mating Behaviour ==
This species is a non-broadcast spawner. Its life cycle does not include the trochophore stage.

== Distribution ==
This marine species mostly occurs off the Philippines. However, they are also found off Papua New Guinea, Solomon Islands, Fiji, and India.
