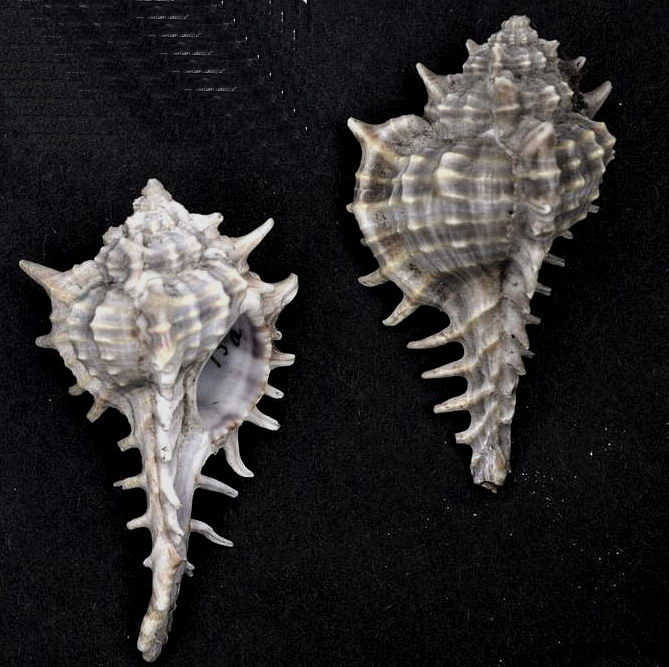
- Two shells of Vokesimurex elenensis (museum specimens at Naturalis Biodiversity Center)

Scientific classification
- Kingdom: Animalia
- Phylum: Mollusca
- Class: Gastropoda
- Subclass: Caenogastropoda
- Order: Neogastropoda
- Family: Muricidae
- Genus: Vokesimurex
- Species: V. elenensis

Binomial name
- Vokesimurex elenensis (Dall, 1909)

Synonyms
- Haustellum elenense (Dall, 1909); Haustellum elenensis [sic] (incorrect gender ending); Murex elenensis Dall, 1909; Murex plicatus G.B. Sowerby II, 1834 (invalid: junior homonym of Murex plicatus Gmelin, 1791; M. elenensis is a replacement name)

= Vokesimurex elenensis =

Species of gastropod

Vokesimurex elenensis, common name the (Santa) Elena murex, is a species of sea snail, a marine gastropod mollusk in the family Muricidae, the murex snails or rock snails.

== Description ==
The size of the shell varies between 40 mm and 105 mm.

(Described as Murex plicatus) The shell is thick and heavy, the spines are obtuse, short on the whorls and long on the siphonal canal. The color is purplish white, darker within the aperture.

== Distribution ==
This marine species occurs in the Pacific Ocean from Baja California, Mexico, to Peru
