= Vokesimurex bazarutensis =

Scientific classification
- Kingdom: Animalia
- Phylum: Mollusca
- Class: Gastropoda
- Subclass: Caenogastropoda
- Order: Neogastropoda
- Family: Muricidae
- Genus: Vokesimurex
- Species: V. bazarutensis

Binomial name
- Vokesimurex bazarutensis S. G. Veldsman & J. H. Veldsman, 2021

Species of gastropod

Vokesimurex bazarutensis is a species of sea snail, a marine gastropod mollusk in the family Muricidae, the murex snails or rock snails.

== Distribution ==
This marine species occurs off Mozambique.
