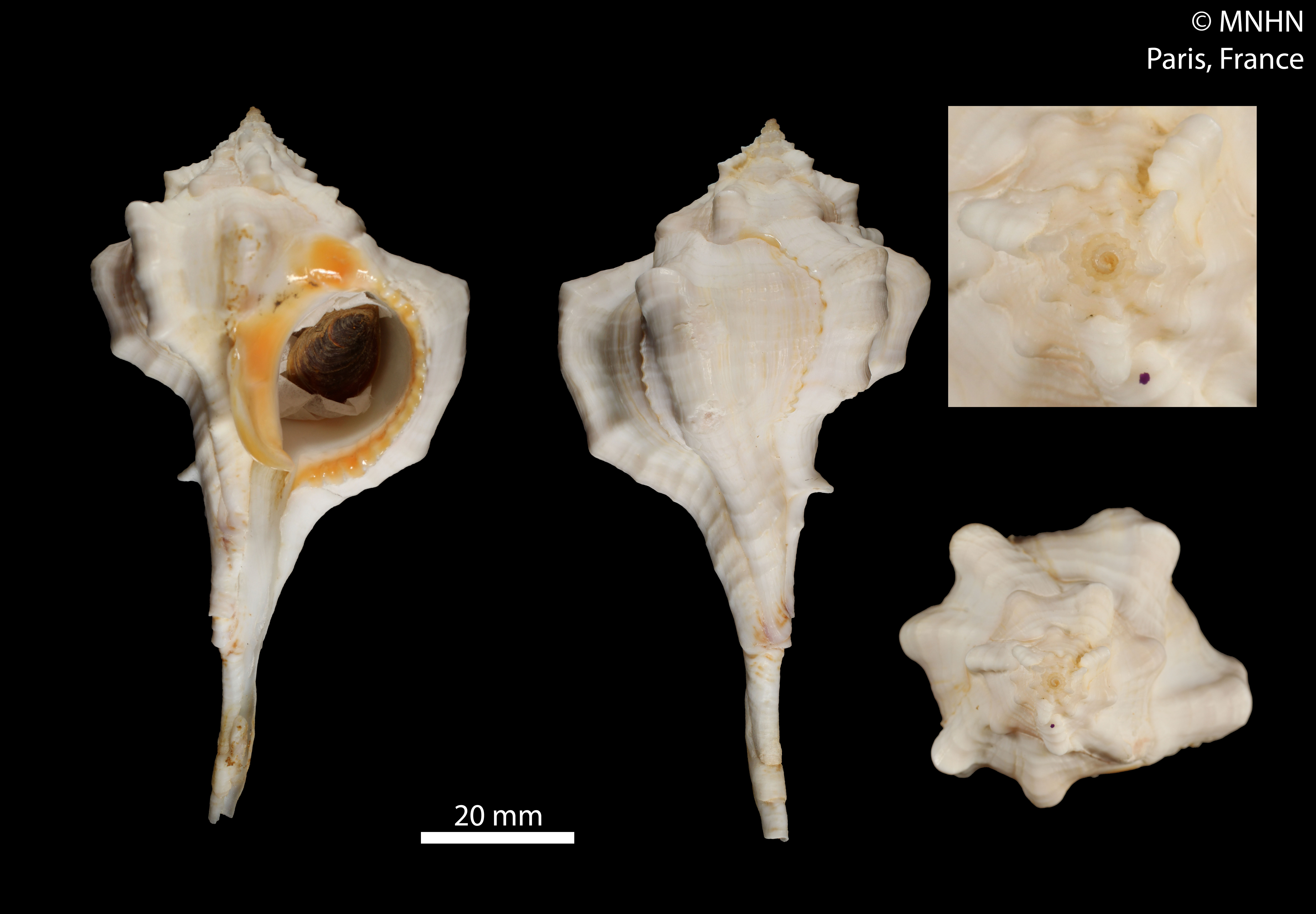

Scientific classification
- Kingdom: Animalia
- Phylum: Mollusca
- Class: Gastropoda
- Subclass: Caenogastropoda
- Order: Neogastropoda
- Family: Muricidae
- Genus: Vokesimurex
- Species: V. hamanni

Binomial name
- Vokesimurex hamanni (Myers & Hertz, 1994)

Synonyms
- Bolinus hamanni Myers & Hertz, 1994

= Vokesimurex hamanni =

Species of gastropod

Vokesimurex hamanni is a species of sea snail, a marine gastropod mollusk in the family Muricidae, the murex snails or rock snails.

== Description ==
The length of the shell attains 64.7 mm.

== Distribution ==
This marine species occurs off Venezuela. Specifically the Venezuelan Exclusive Economic Zone.
