= Vokesimurex samui =

Scientific classification
- Kingdom: Animalia
- Phylum: Mollusca
- Class: Gastropoda
- Subclass: Caenogastropoda
- Order: Neogastropoda
- Family: Muricidae
- Genus: Vokesimurex
- Species: V. samui

Binomial name
- Vokesimurex samui (Petuch, 1987)

Synonyms
- Murex samui Petuch, 1987

Species of gastropod

Vokesimurex samui is a species of sea snail, a marine gastropod mollusk in the family Muricidae, the murex snails or rock snails.

== Description ==
Original description: "Shell large, inflated, with bulbous body whorl; 3 varices per whorl; body whorl and varices ornamented with 20 raised, spiral cords; cords on varices become rib-like, often ending in small, scale-like spine; varix with 3 large spines, 1 at shoulder, 1 at mid-body, and 1 at base; short, stubby secondary spines between 3 large spines on some varices; shoulders of spire varices with 1 large projecting spine; siphonal canal with 1 large spine near top, several smaller scale-like spines below; end of siphonal canal smooth; columellar region with large, erect parietal shield that does not adhere to body of shell; aperture very large and flaring, round in shape; shell color uniformly pure white (holotype with some patches of rust stains); intervarical regions with 3 weak, knobbed axial ribs."

== Distribution ==
Locus typicus: "Off Monkey River, Belize."
