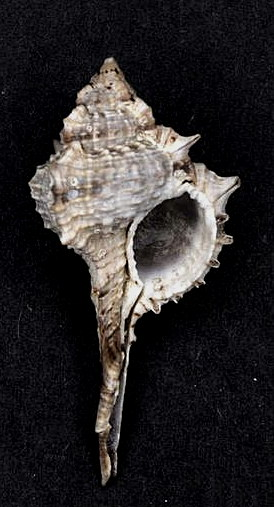
- Shell of Vokesimurex woodringi (museum specimen at Naturalis Biodiversity Center)

Scientific classification
- Kingdom: Animalia
- Phylum: Mollusca
- Class: Gastropoda
- Subclass: Caenogastropoda
- Order: Neogastropoda
- Family: Muricidae
- Genus: Vokesimurex
- Species: V. woodringi

Binomial name
- Vokesimurex woodringi (Clench & Pérez Farfante, 1945)

Synonyms
- Murex woodringi Clench & Pérez Farfante, 1945; Murex woodringi var. gustaviensis Nowell-Usticke, 1969

= Vokesimurex woodringi =

Species of gastropod

Vokesimurex woodringi, common name Woodring's murex, is a species of sea snail, a marine gastropod mollusk in the family Muricidae, the murex snails or rock snails. The species is named in honor of Wendell P. Woodring.

== Description ==
The size of the shell varies between 30 mm and 70 mm. The species was originally described as Murex woodringi by William J. Clench and Irene Pérez Farfante in 1945. Nowell-Usticke described a variety, Murex woodringi var. gustaviensis, in 1969; it is now treated as a synonym of V. woodringi.

== Distribution ==
This species occurs in the Caribbean Sea (Panama, Belize, Grenadines).
