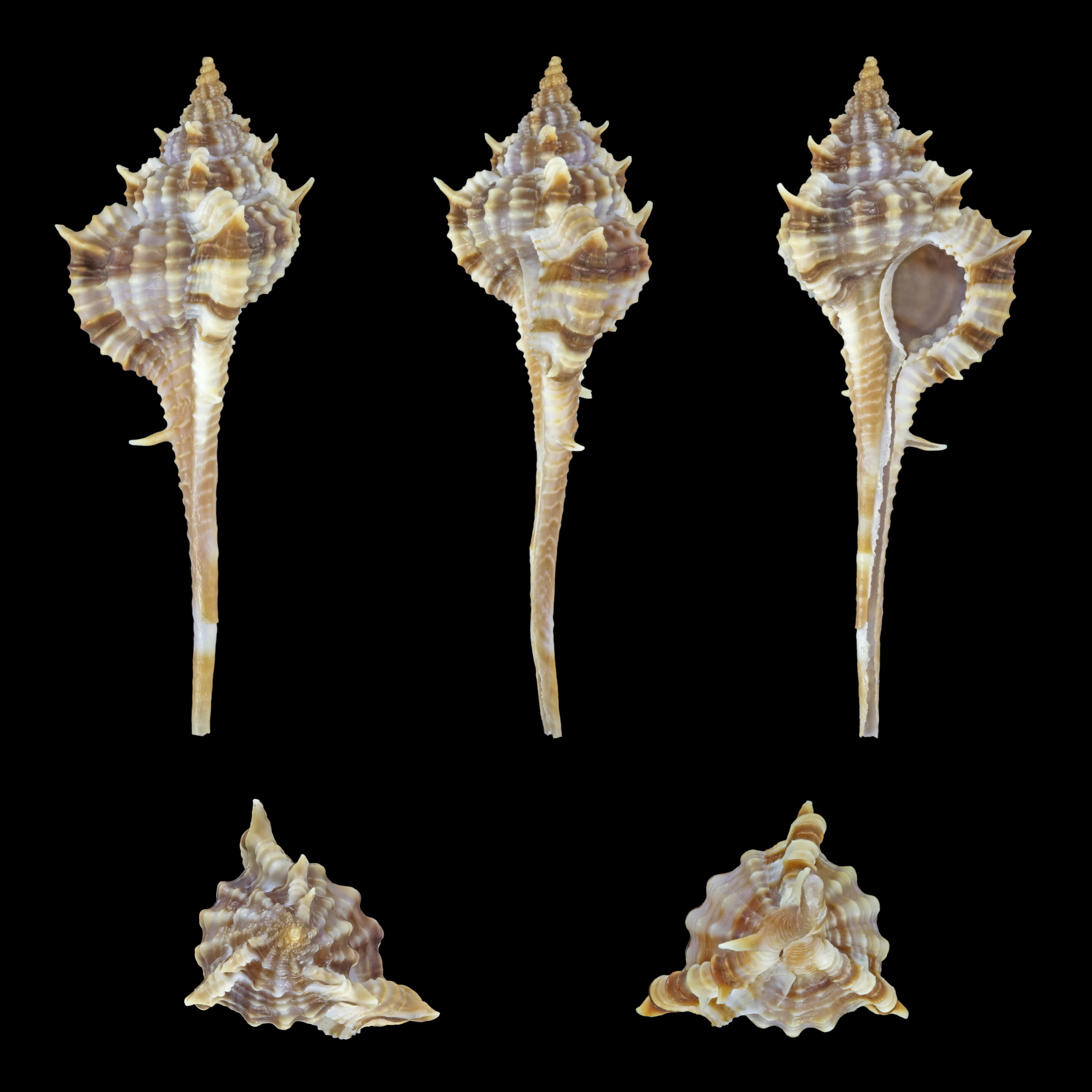

Scientific classification
- Kingdom: Animalia
- Phylum: Mollusca
- Class: Gastropoda
- Subclass: Caenogastropoda
- Order: Neogastropoda
- Family: Muricidae
- Genus: Vokesimurex
- Species: V. rectirostris

Binomial name
- Vokesimurex rectirostris (Sowerby II, 1841)

Synonyms
- Haustellum rectirostris (Sowerby, 1841); Murex rectirostris Sowerby, 1841 (basionym)

= Vokesimurex rectirostris =

Species of gastropod

Vokesimurex rectirostris, common name : the erect-spined murex, is a species of sea snail, a marine gastropod mollusk in the family Muricidae, the murex snails or rock snails.

== Description ==
The shell of an adult varies between 33 mm and 80 mm.

== Distribution ==
This marine species can be found off Southwest Japan and Vietnam and in the East China Sea and the South China Sea.
