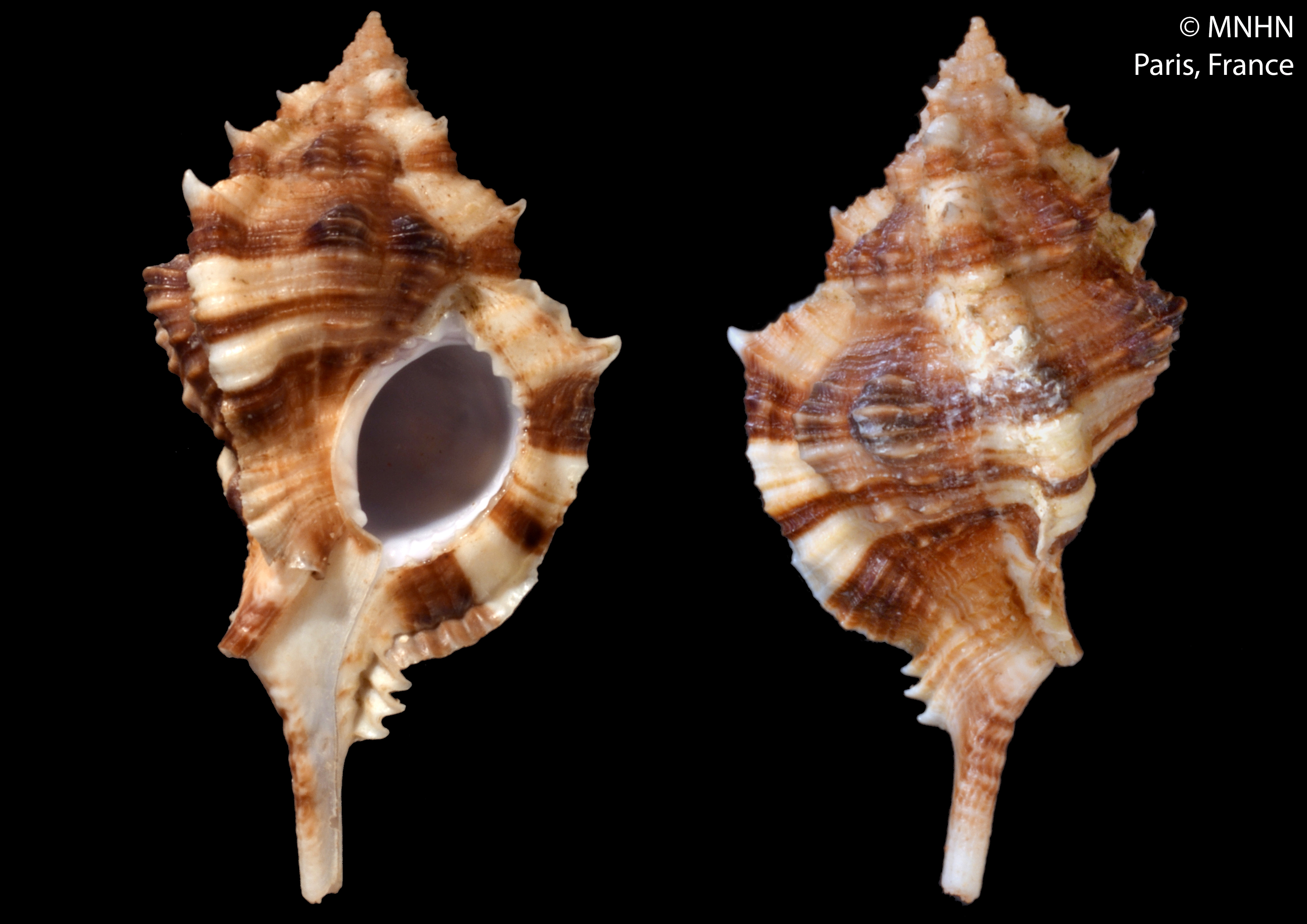
- Shell of Siratus motacilla (specimen at MNHN, Paris)

Scientific classification
- Kingdom: Animalia
- Phylum: Mollusca
- Class: Gastropoda
- Subclass: Caenogastropoda
- Order: Neogastropoda
- Family: Muricidae
- Genus: Siratus
- Species: S. motacilla

Binomial name
- Siratus motacilla (Gmelin, 1791)

Synonyms
- Murex briskasii Verrill, 1953; Murex motacilla Gmelin, 1791

= Siratus motacilla =

Species of gastropod

Siratus motacilla is a species of sea snail, a marine gastropod mollusc in the family Muricidae, the murex snails or rock snails.

== Description ==
The length of the shell regularly attains 50–60 mm.

Its shell colour varies between shades of yellow through pink to a darker red, in strong spiral bands.

This deepwater species can have a considerably extended siphonal canal sometimes accounting for more than half the shell's overall length. The mollusc's operculum efficiently seals the aperture completely.

== Distribution ==
This uncommon species has been trapped alive off the West coast of Barbados Lesser Antilles, at depths around 100 m; also off Martinique.
