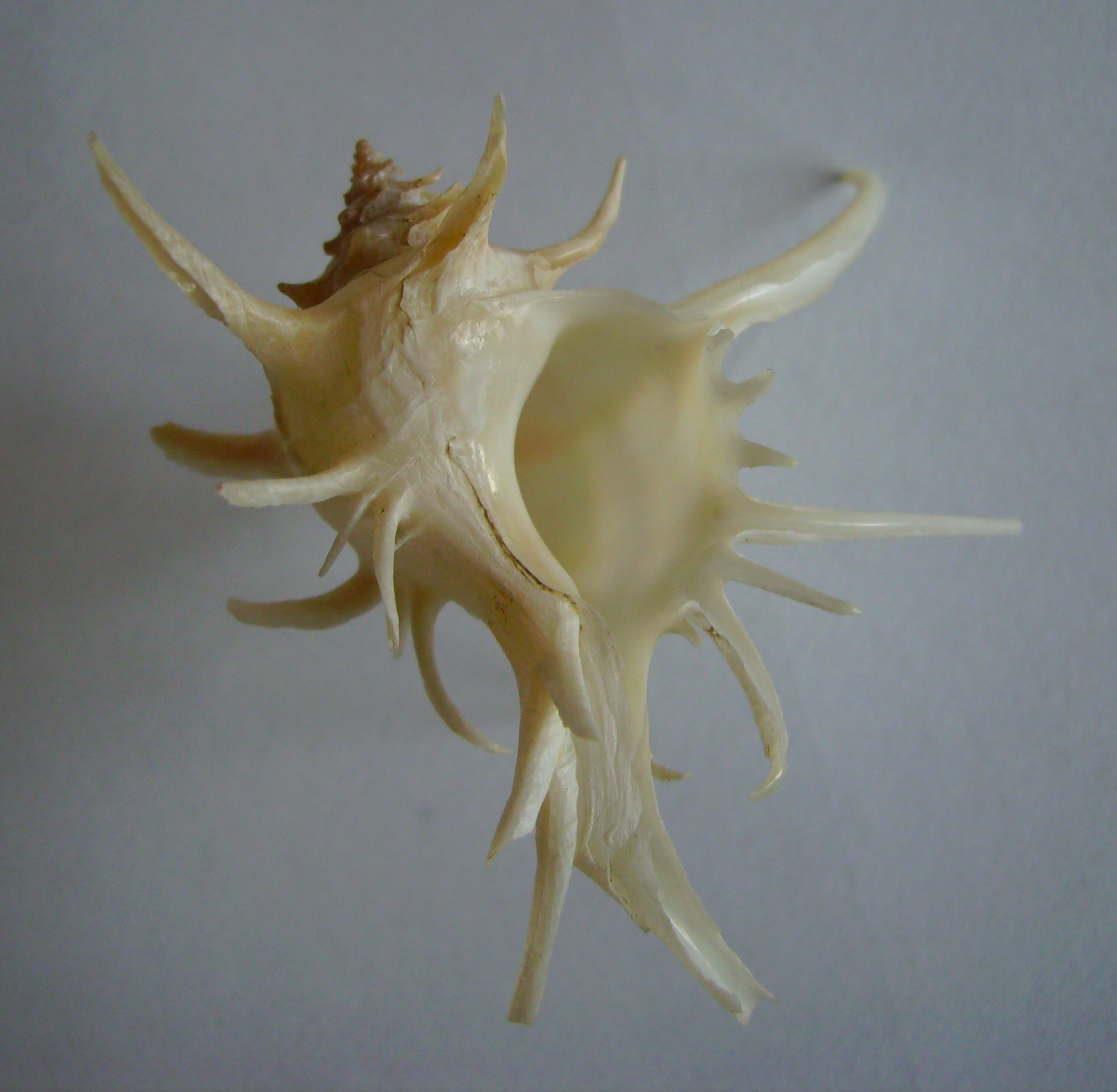
- An apertural view of a shell of Poirieria zelandica, anterior end towards the bottom of the page

Scientific classification
- Kingdom: Animalia
- Phylum: Mollusca
- Class: Gastropoda
- Subclass: Caenogastropoda
- Order: Neogastropoda
- Family: Muricidae
- Subfamily: Muricinae; Rafinesque, 1815

Genera
- See text

= Muricinae =

Muricinae Temporal range: Cretaceous - Recent

Subfamily of gastropods

Muricinae is a taxonomic subfamily of predatory sea snails, marine gastropod molluscs within the large family Muricidae, the murex snails and rock snails.

The Muricinae represent approximately 780 valid names of fossil (378) and recent (400) species. This subfamily contains the true Murex, and many other closely related genera.

== Systematics ==
The subdivision of the Muricidae into subfamilies is mainly based on the work of Bouchet & Rocroi (2005), who combined morphological and molecular data in order to define the Muricinae. However, based on latest knowledge this subfamily might represent a polyphyletic group. Traditional the Muricinae are subdivided into five informal groups, which contain 47 genera and subgenera:

1. Muricinae (s.s.) group

- Flexopteron Shuto, 1969
- Murex (s.s) Linnaeus, 1758
- M. (Promurex) Ponder & Vokes, 1988
- Haustellum Schumacher, 1817
- Vokesimurex Petuch, 1994
- Siratus Jousseaume, 1880
- Bolinus Pusch, 1837
- Hexaplex (s.s.) Perry, 1811
- H. (Trunculariopsis) Cossmann, 1921
- Muricanthus Swainson, 1840
- Chicoreus (s.s.) Montfort, 1810
- C. (Chicopinnatus) Houart, 1992
- C. (Rhizophorimurex) Oyama, 1950
- C. (Triplex) Perry, 1810
- Chicomurex Arakawa, 1964
- Phyllonotus Swainson, 1833
- Naquetia Jousseaume, 1880

2. Pterynotus-Textilomurex group

- Pterynotus (s.s) Swainson, 1833
- P. (Pterymarchia) Houart, 1995
- Textiliomurex Merle, 2011

3. Basal muricids group

- Timbellus de Gregorio, 1885
- Pterochelus Jousseaume, 1880
- Purpurellus Jousseaume, 1880
- Ponderia Houart, 1986
- Prototyphis Ponder, 1972
- Poirieria (s.s) Jousseaume, 1880
- P. (Actinotrophon) Dall, 1902
- P. (Caelobassus) Stilwell & Zinsmeister, 1992
- P. (Pagodula) Monterosato, 1884
- Paziella (s.s) Jousseaume, 1880
- P. (Bouchetia) Houart & Héros, 2008
- Crassimurex (s.s) Merle, 1990
- C. (Eopaziella) Gürs, 2001
- Harmatia Noszky, 1940
- Gamurex Merle, 2011
- Falsimuricopsis Merle, 2011

4. Calotrophon-Attiliosa group

- Calotrophon (s.s) Hertlein & Strong, 1951
- C. (Acantholabia) Olsson & Harbison, 1953
- C. (Panamurex) Woodring, 1959

The subfamilial place of the last groups should be regarded as provisional.
