= Siratus vokesorum =

Scientific classification
- Kingdom: Animalia
- Phylum: Mollusca
- Class: Gastropoda
- Subclass: Caenogastropoda
- Order: Neogastropoda
- Family: Muricidae
- Genus: Siratus
- Species: S. vokesorum

Binomial name
- Siratus vokesorum (Garcia, 1999)

Synonyms
- Chicoreus (Siratus) vokesorum Garcia, 1999

Species of gastropod

Siratus vokesorum is a species of sea snail, a marine gastropod mollusk in the family Muricidae, the murex snails or rock snails. Originally in the subspecies Chicoreus, it has since been elevated to the distinct genus, Siratus.

== Description ==
The height of the shell attains 32 mm. The Siratus vokesorum, like other Muricidae family species, is equipped with a highly specialized radula, or a ribbon of microscopic teeth used to drill direct holes into the proctective shells of bivalves or gastropods.

== Distribution ==
This species occurs in the Atlantic Ocean off the Bahamas, specifically the Bahamas Exclusive Economic Zone, at depths between 46 m and 273 m.

== Closer species/relatives ==
While Siratus vokesorum is its own special species in the Muricidae family, there are a few other relative species close to the Siratus vokesorum. Species include the Siratus beauii, having an elongated, slender profile and a vastly delicate shell, measuring from 90 mm to 120 mm, but existing primarily in the Western Atlantic area, and the Siratus articulatus, the closest subspecies to the Siratus vokesorum, most notable for its highly variable colors and brown spiral lines, they are measuring from 50 mm to 90-95 mm, they mainly exist in the Caribbean and the Florida Keys.
