= Caillet =

Caillet is a French surname. Notable people with the surname include:

- Albert Caillet (1901–1925), French footballer
- César Caillet (born 1974), Chilean actor
- Françoise Landowski-Caillet (1917–2007), French pianist and painter
- Guillaume Caillet, a wealthy peasant who led the peasant Jacquerie in May 1358
- Jean-Philippe Caillet (born 1977), former French footballer

== See also ==
- Colbie Caillat (born 1985), American singer-songwriter
- Lucien Cailliet (1891–1985), French-American composer, conductor, arranger, and clarinetist.
- Caillet's murex, a species of sea snail
