= Siratus aguayoi =

Scientific classification
- Kingdom: Animalia
- Phylum: Mollusca
- Class: Gastropoda
- Subclass: Caenogastropoda
- Order: Neogastropoda
- Family: Muricidae
- Genus: Siratus
- Species: S. aguayoi

Binomial name
- Siratus aguayoi (Clench & Perez Farfante, 1945)

Synonyms
- Murex aguayoi Clench & Perez Farfante, 1945

Species of gastropod

Siratus aguayoi is a species of sea snail, a marine gastropod mollusk in the family Muricidae, the murex snails or rock snails.
