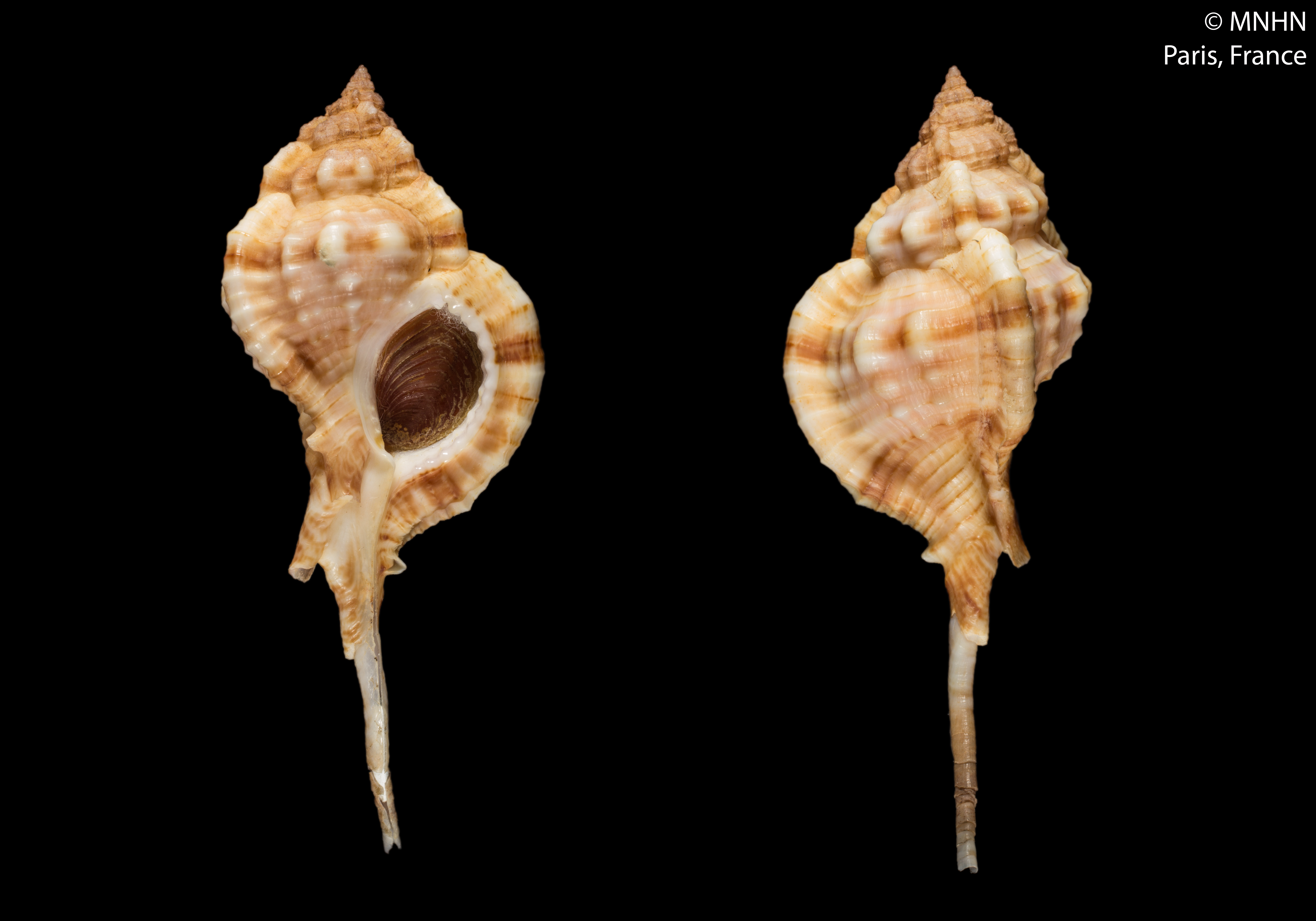
- Shell of Siratus bessei (holotype at MNHN, Paris)

Scientific classification
- Kingdom: Animalia
- Phylum: Mollusca
- Class: Gastropoda
- Subclass: Caenogastropoda
- Order: Neogastropoda
- Family: Muricidae
- Genus: Siratus
- Species: S. bessei

Binomial name
- Siratus bessei (Houart, 2000)

Synonyms
- Chicoreus (Siratus) bessei Houart, 2000

= Siratus bessei =

Species of gastropod

Siratus bessei is a species of sea snail, a marine gastropod mollusk in the family Muricidae, the murex snails or rock snails.

== Description ==
Members of the species are mostly gonochoric and broadcast spawners. Embryos develop into planktonic trochophore larvae and later into juvenile veligers before becoming fully grown adults.

== Distribution ==
This marine species occurs off Honduras.
