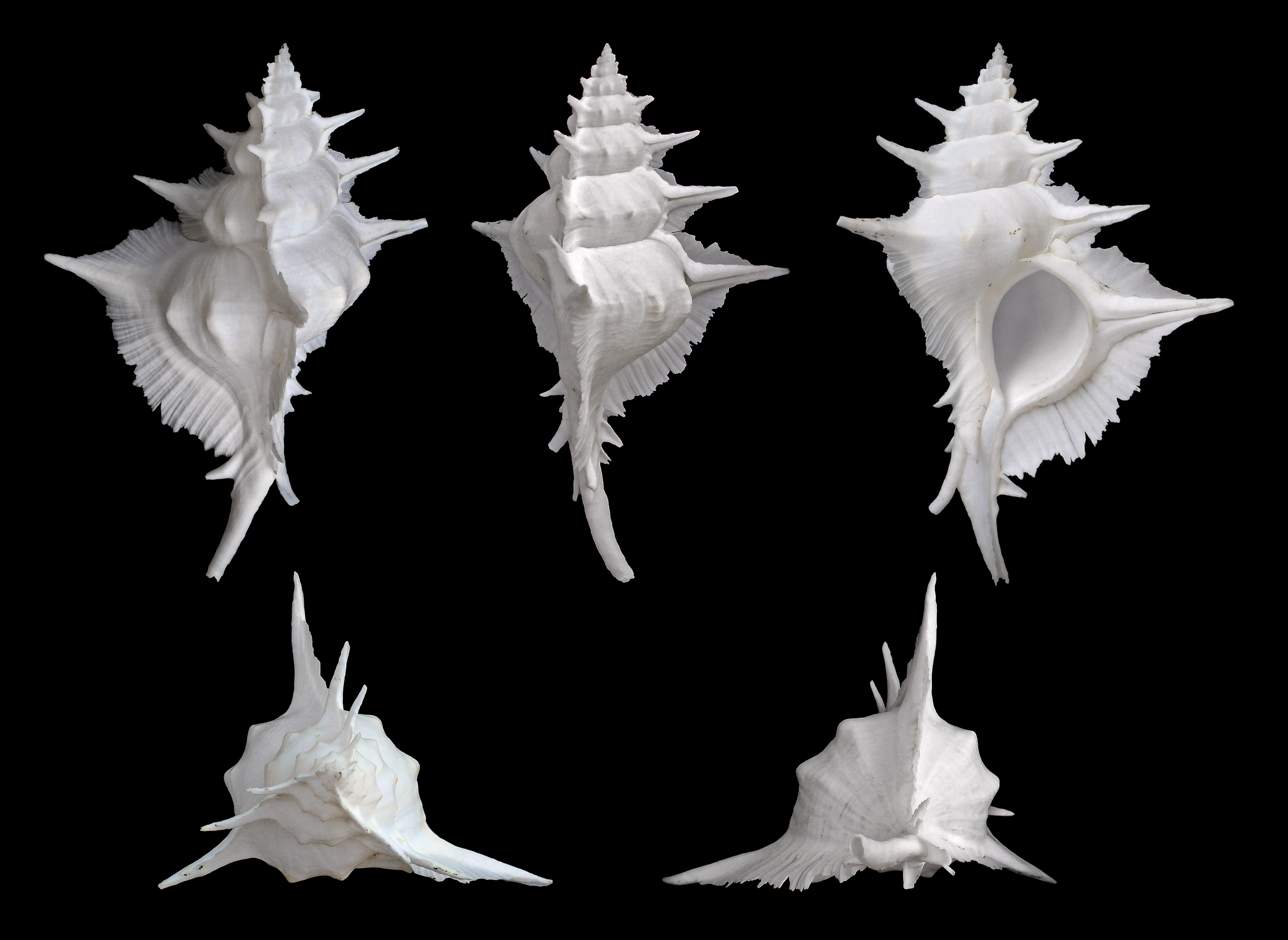

Scientific classification
- Kingdom: Animalia
- Phylum: Mollusca
- Class: Gastropoda
- Subclass: Caenogastropoda
- Order: Neogastropoda
- Family: Muricidae
- Genus: Siratus
- Species: S. alabaster

Binomial name
- Siratus alabaster (Reeve, 1845)

Synonyms
- Murex alabaster Reeve, 1845 (basionym)

= Siratus alabaster =

Species of gastropod

Siratus alabaster, or Alabaster Murex, is a predatory species of sea snail, a marine gastropod mollusc in the family Muricidae, often referred to as the murex or rock snails. It is found in the waters around Japan, Taiwan, and down to the Philippines. The shell of the snail is distinctively large, fusiform, and often crisply white though it may also be ivory.

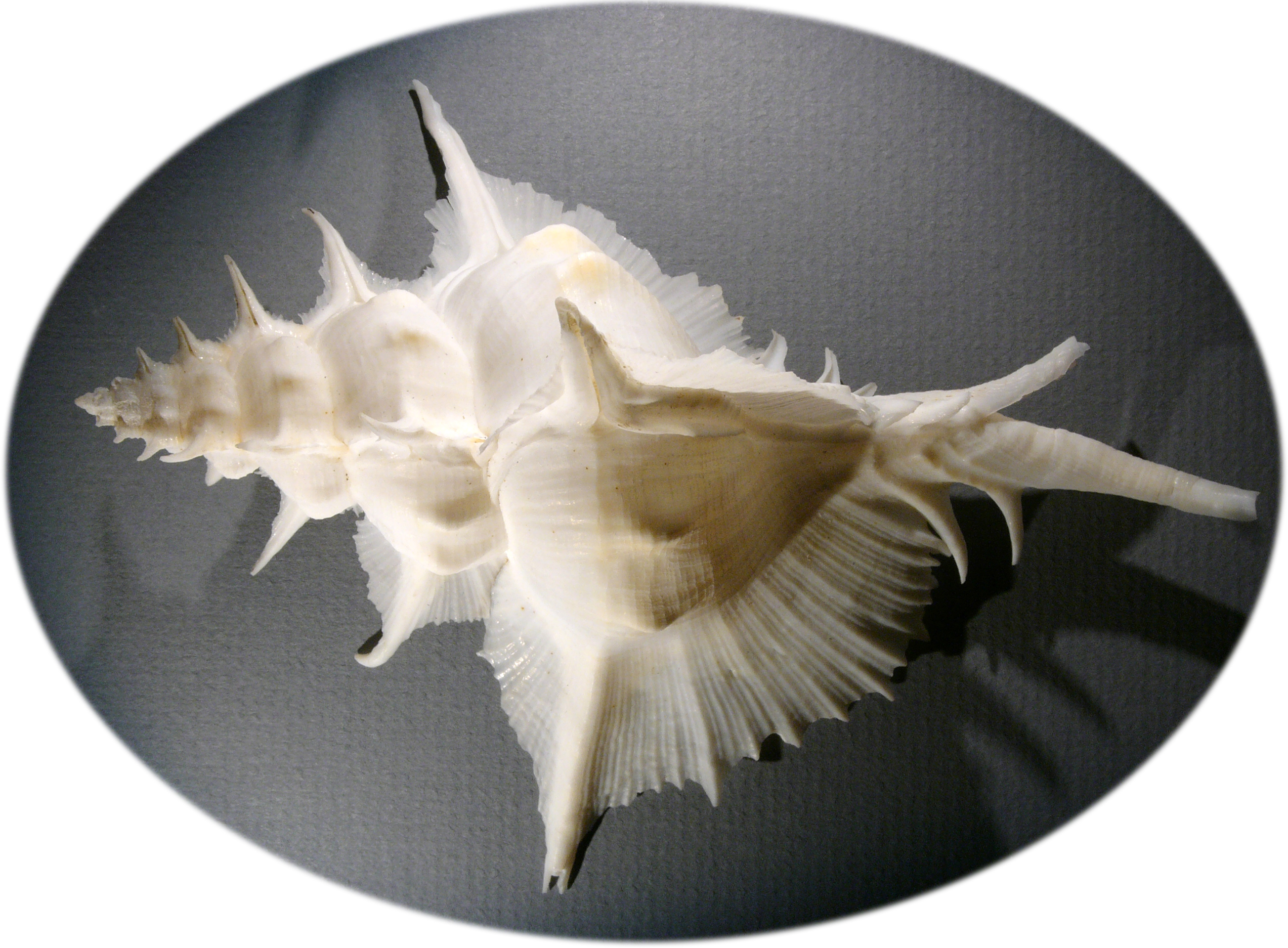
