= Siratus springeri =

Scientific classification
- Kingdom: Animalia
- Phylum: Mollusca
- Class: Gastropoda
- Subclass: Caenogastropoda
- Order: Neogastropoda
- Family: Muricidae
- Genus: Siratus
- Species: S. springeri

Binomial name
- Siratus springeri (Bullis, 1964)

Synonyms
- Murex springeri Bullis, 1964

Species of gastropod

Siratus springeri is a species of sea snail, a marine gastropod mollusk in the family Muricidae, the murex snails or rock snails.
