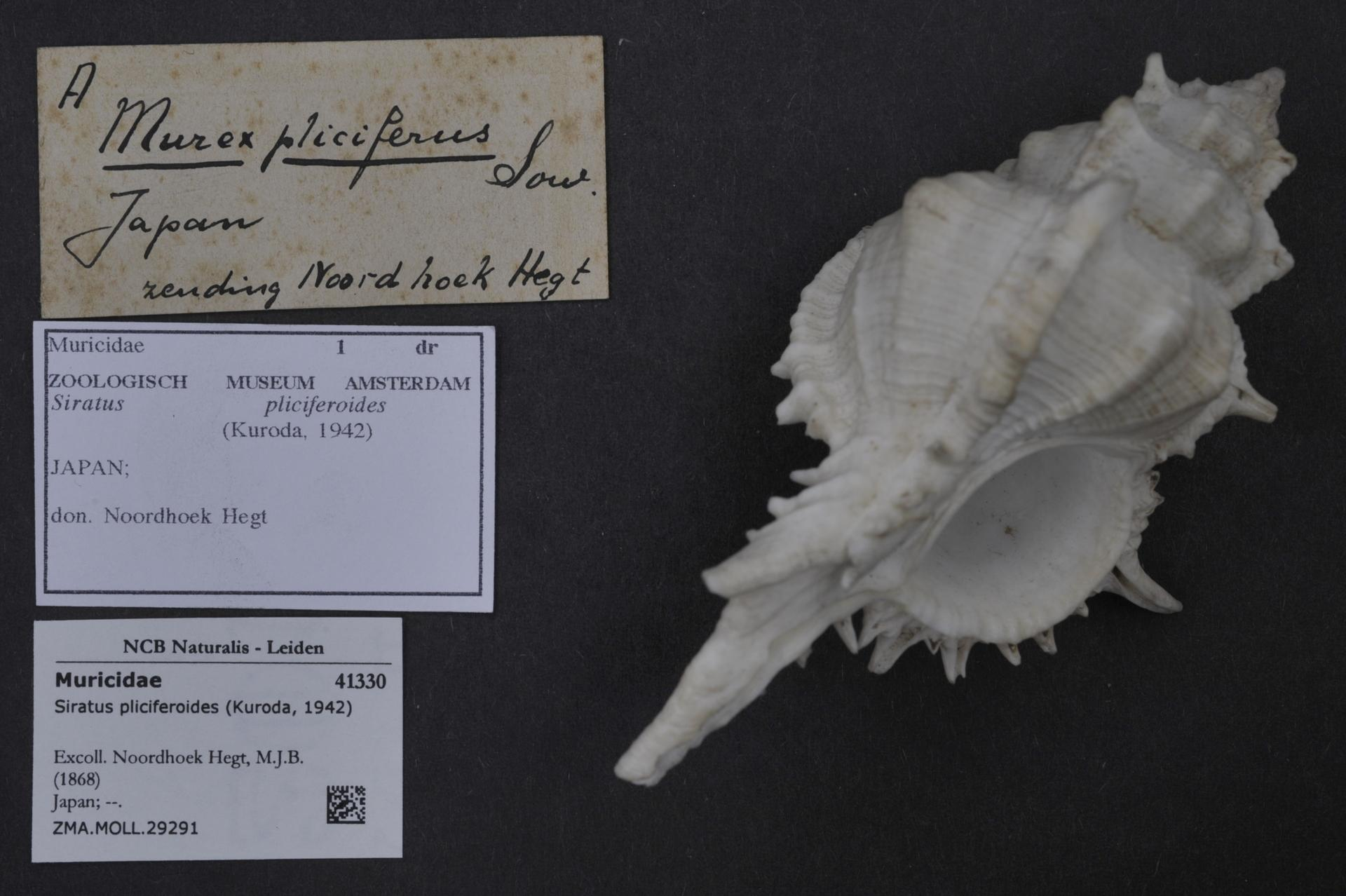

Scientific classification
- Kingdom: Animalia
- Phylum: Mollusca
- Class: Gastropoda
- Subclass: Caenogastropoda
- Order: Neogastropoda
- Family: Muricidae
- Genus: Siratus
- Species: S. pliciferoides

Binomial name
- Siratus pliciferoides (Kuroda, 1942)

Synonyms
- Chicoreus pliciferoides Kuroda, 1942; Murex (Siratus) propinquus Kuroda & Azuma in Azuma, 1961; Murex pliciferus Sowerby, 1841; Siratus hirasei Shikama, 1977; Siratus vicdani Kosuge, 1980

= Siratus pliciferoides =

Species of gastropod

Siratus pliciferoides is a species of sea snail, a marine gastropod mollusk in the family Muricidae, the murex snails or rock snails.

== Description ==
The shell of S. pliciferoides is large, broad, heavy, and spiny, attaining a maximum length of nearly 150 mm. The overall size of the shell varies between specimens, with a marked range in the breadth of the last whorl, the length of the siphonal canal, and the thickness of the varices this variation in the past led to the description of several synonymous names for the same taxon. In Australian waters, the species has been recorded at depths of 50 to 500 metres, on the continental shelf and continental slope.

=== Synonymy ===
The species was originally described in 1942 by Kuroda under the name Chicoreus pliciferoides as a replacement for the preoccupied name Murex pliciferus Sowerby, 1841. Additional names have since been proposed and are now treated as synonyms, including Murex propinquus Kuroda & Azuma (described in 1961), Siratus hirasei Shikama (1977), and Siratus vicdani Kosuge (1980).

== Distribution ==
Siratus pliciferoides is found in a wide area of the Indo-West Pacific. It extends from southeastern and central Japan and Taiwan through the Philippines to southern Western Australia, the Solomon Islands, New Caledonia, Tonga, and Fiji. This species has been found in Australia in Queensland and Western Australia, and more widely distributed throughout the western Pacific from Taiwan to Vanuatu. Further it has been collected as a living specimen at depths of 300 to 364 metres in Fijian and Tongan waters. The species has a planktotrophic larval development, which is thought to be responsible for the broad distribution of the species.
