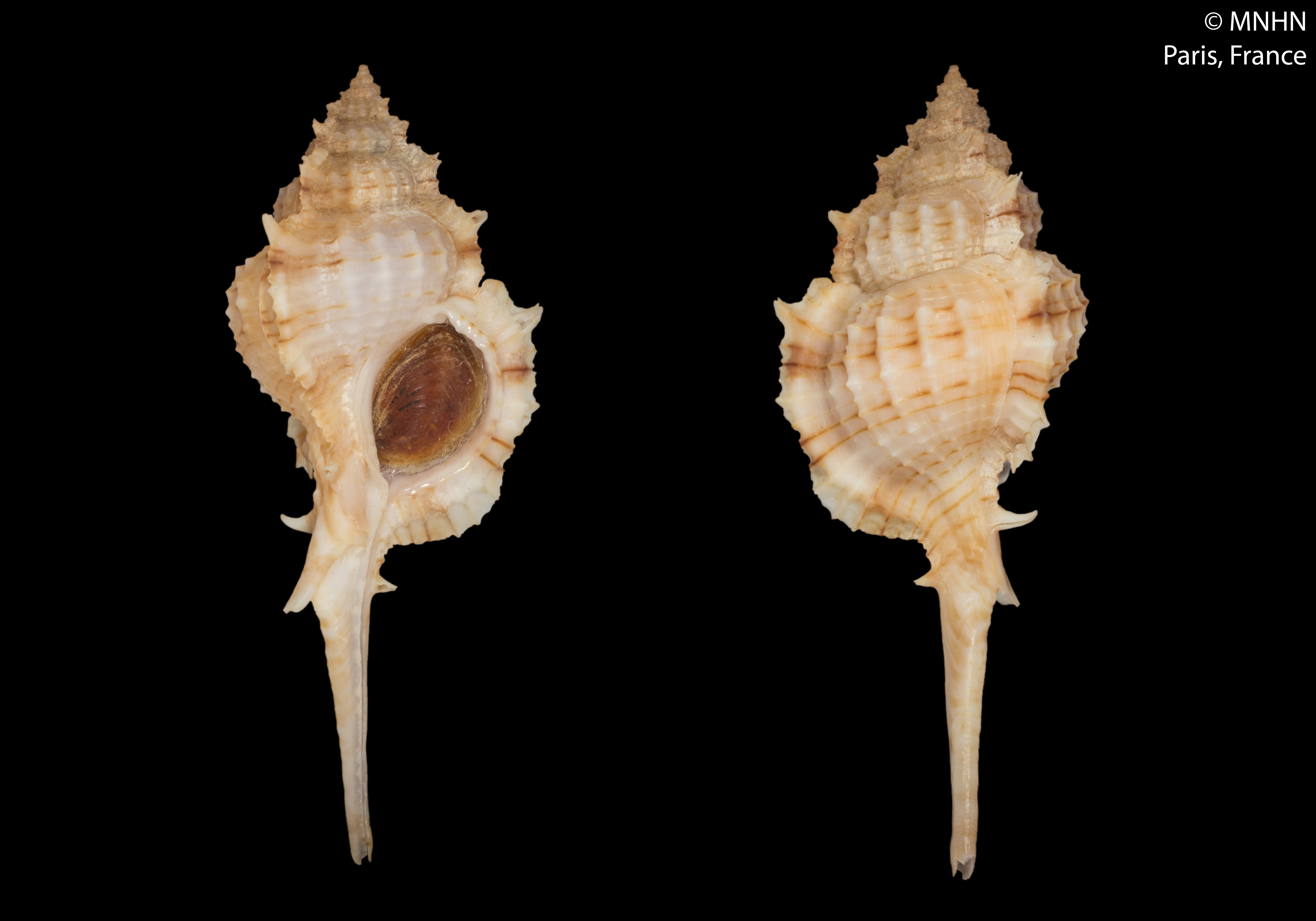
- Shell of Siratus hennequini (holotype at MNHN, Paris)

Scientific classification
- Kingdom: Animalia
- Phylum: Mollusca
- Class: Gastropoda
- Subclass: Caenogastropoda
- Order: Neogastropoda
- Family: Muricidae
- Genus: Siratus
- Species: S. hennequini

Binomial name
- Siratus hennequini (Houart, 2000)

Synonyms
- Chicoreus (Siratus) hennequini Houart, 2000

= Siratus hennequini =

Species of gastropod

Siratus hennequini is a species of sea snail, a marine gastropod mollusk in the family Muricidae, the murex snails or rock snails.

== Distribution ==
This marine species occurs off Honduras.
