= Siratus coltrorum =

Scientific classification
- Kingdom: Animalia
- Phylum: Mollusca
- Class: Gastropoda
- Subclass: Caenogastropoda
- Order: Neogastropoda
- Family: Muricidae
- Genus: Siratus
- Species: S. coltrorum

Binomial name
- Siratus coltrorum (Vokes, 1990)

Synonyms
- Chicoreus (Siratus) coltrorum Vokes, 1990

Species of gastropod

Siratus coltrorum is a species of sea snail, a marine gastropod mollusk in the family Muricidae, the murex snails or rock snails.

== Distribution ==
Western Atlantic Ocean, Coast of Brazil
