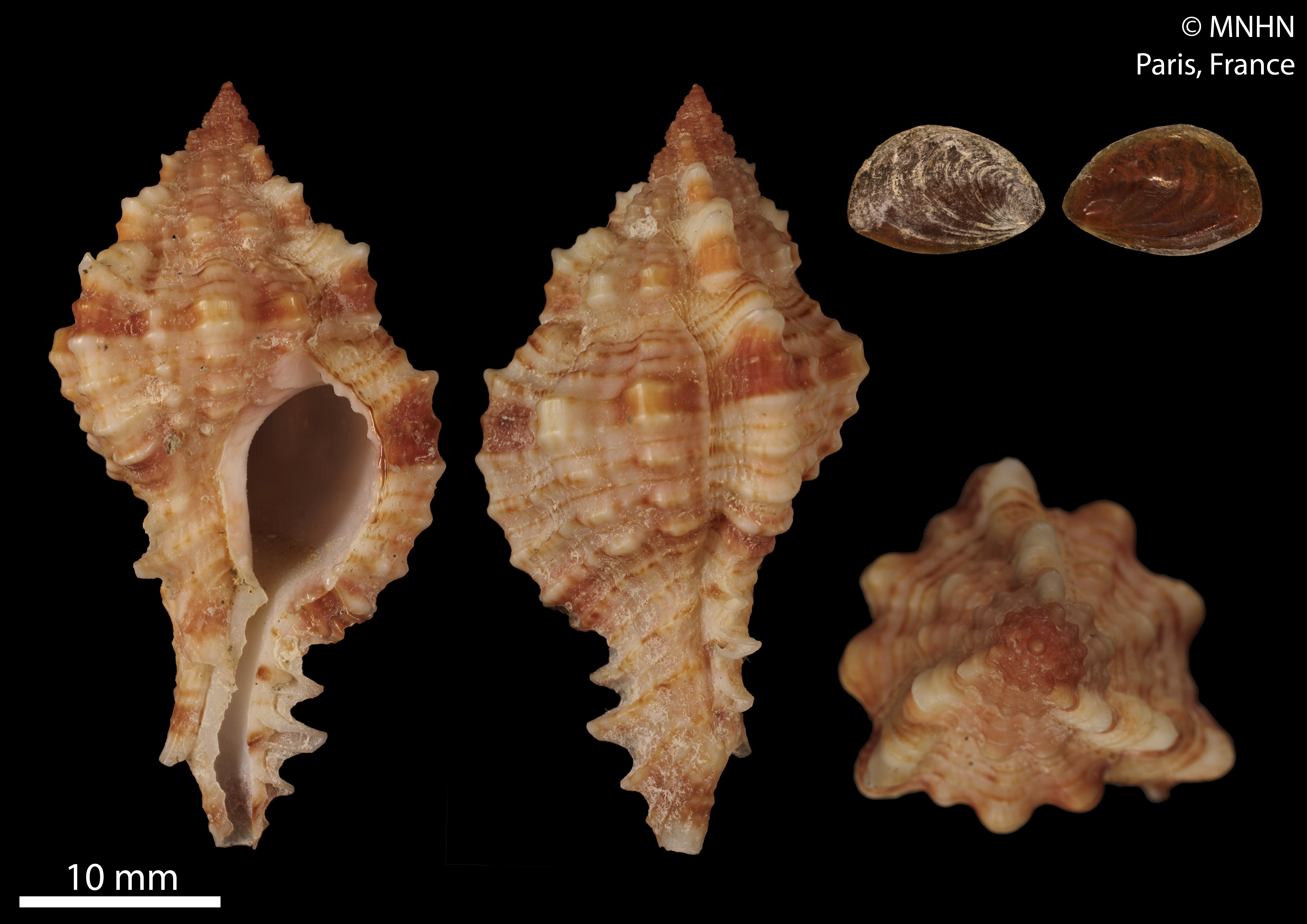
- Siratus consuela (MNHN-IM-2013-60699)

Scientific classification
- Kingdom: Animalia
- Phylum: Mollusca
- Class: Gastropoda
- Subclass: Caenogastropoda
- Order: Neogastropoda
- Family: Muricidae
- Genus: Siratus
- Species: S. consuela

Binomial name
- Siratus consuela (Verrill, 1950)

Synonyms
- Chicoreus (Siratus) consuela (A. H. Verrill, 1950); Chicoreus consuela (A. H. Verrill, 1950); Chicoreus consuelae (Vokes, 1963); Murex consuelae Vokes, 1963 (unjustified emendation); Murex consuelae A. H. Verrill, 1950; Murex pulcher A. Adams, 1853; Murex pulcher var. consuela Verrill, 1950

= Siratus consuela =

Species of gastropod

Siratus consuela is a species of sea snail, a marine gastropod mollusk in the family Muricidae, the murex snails or rock snails.

== Description ==
An uncommon species, trapped alive along with other species of Siratus at depths around 100 metres offshore West coast of Barbados

== Distribution ==
This marine species occurs off Barbados, Dominica and Guadeloupe.
