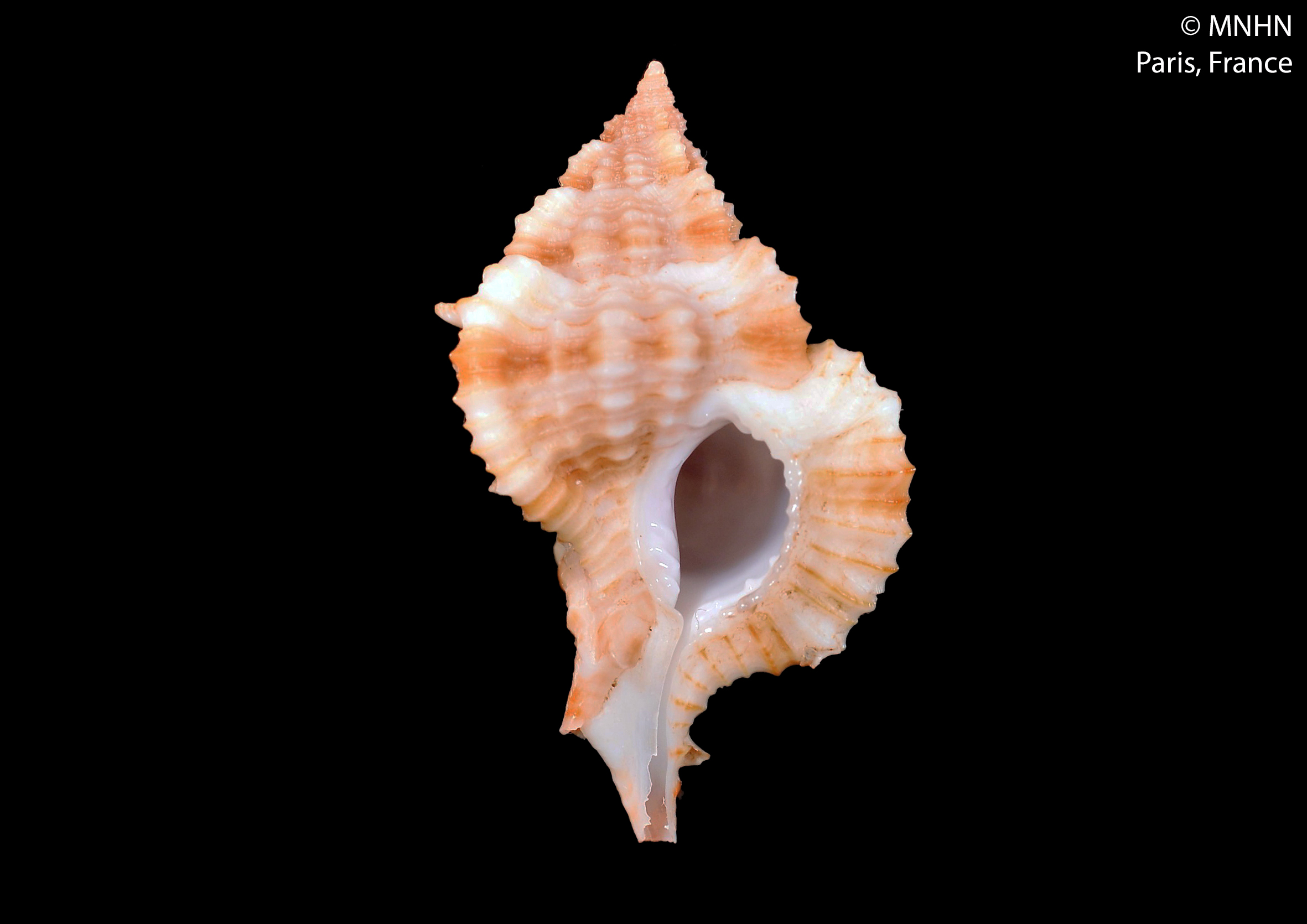
- Shell of Siratus thompsoni (specimen at MNHN, Paris)

Scientific classification
- Kingdom: Animalia
- Phylum: Mollusca
- Class: Gastropoda
- Subclass: Caenogastropoda
- Order: Neogastropoda
- Family: Muricidae
- Genus: Siratus
- Species: S. thompsoni

Binomial name
- Siratus thompsoni (Bullis, 1964)

Synonyms
- Murex thompsoni Bullis, 1964

= Siratus thompsoni =

Species of gastropod

Siratus thompsoni is a species of sea snail, a marine gastropod mollusk in the family Muricidae, the murex snails or rock snails.

== Distribution ==
This marine species occurs off French Guyana.
