= Siratus carolynae =

Scientific classification
- Kingdom: Animalia
- Phylum: Mollusca
- Class: Gastropoda
- Subclass: Caenogastropoda
- Order: Neogastropoda
- Family: Muricidae
- Genus: Siratus
- Species: S. carolynae

Binomial name
- Siratus carolynae (Vokes, 1990)

Synonyms
- Chicoreus (Siratus) carolynae Vokes, 1990

Species of gastropod

Siratus carolynae is a species of sea snail, a marine gastropod mollusk in the family Muricidae, the murex snails or rock snails.

== Description ==
This offshore species attains a size of 50 mm.

== Distribution ==
Often trawled at 40-55 metres, off Bahia, Brazil.
