= Siratus perelegans =

Scientific classification
- Kingdom: Animalia
- Phylum: Mollusca
- Class: Gastropoda
- Subclass: Caenogastropoda
- Order: Neogastropoda
- Family: Muricidae
- Genus: Siratus
- Species: S. perelegans

Binomial name
- Siratus perelegans (Vokes, 1965)

Synonyms
- Chicoreus perelegans Vokes, 1965; Murex elegans Beck in Sowerby, 1841

Species of gastropod

Siratus perelegans is a species of sea snail, a marine gastropod mollusk in the family Muricidae, the murex snails or rock snails.
