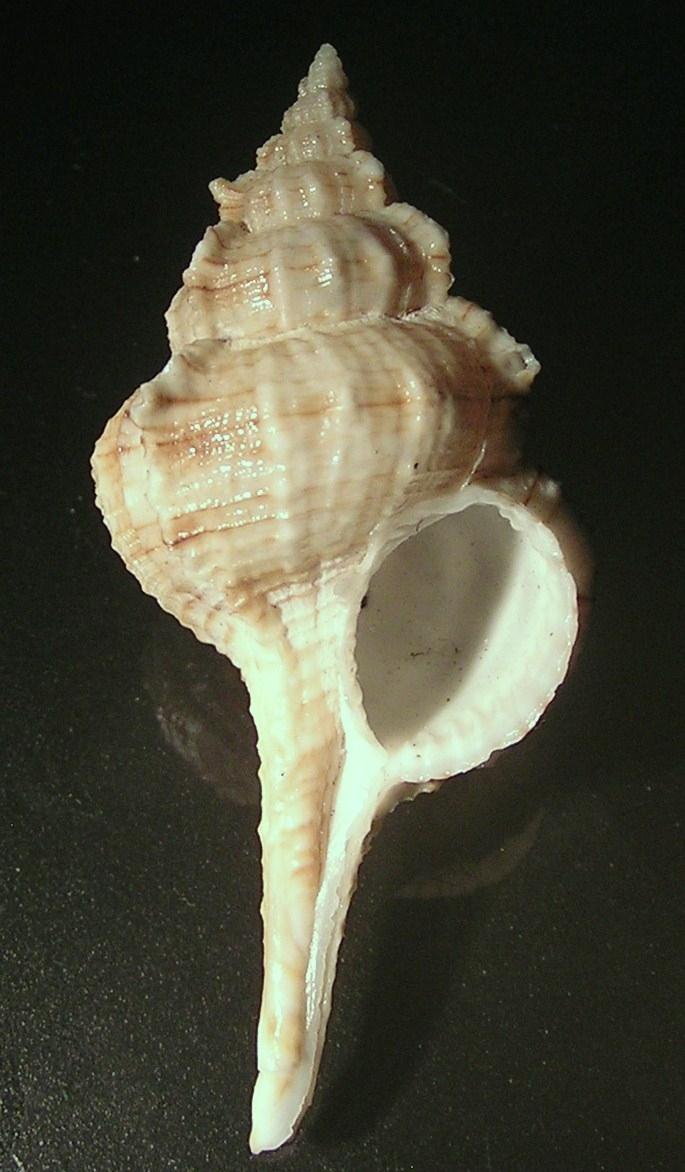
- Shell of Siratus ciboney

Scientific classification
- Kingdom: Animalia
- Phylum: Mollusca
- Class: Gastropoda
- Subclass: Caenogastropoda
- Order: Neogastropoda
- Family: Muricidae
- Subfamily: Muricinae
- Genus: Siratus; Jousseaume, 1880

Type species
- Murex sirat d'Orbigny, 1841

Synonyms
- Chicoreus (Siratus) Jousseaume, 1880; Murex (Siratus) Jousseaume, 1880

= Siratus =

Genus of gastropods

Siratus is a genus of sea snails, marine gastropod molluscs in the subfamily Muricinae of the family Muricidae, the murex snails or rock snails.

== Species ==
Species within the genus Siratus include:

- Siratus aguayoi (Clench & Perez Farfante, 1945)
- Siratus alabaster (Reeve, 1845)
- Siratus articulatus (Reeve, 1845)
- Siratus beauii (Fischer & Bernardi, 1857)
- Siratus bessei (Houart, 2000)
- Siratus cailletti (Petit, 1856)
- Siratus carolynae (Vokes, 1990)
- Siratus caudacurtus (Houart, 1999)
- Siratus ciboney (Clench & Perez Farfante, 1945)
- Siratus colellai (Houart, 1999)
- Siratus coltrorum (Vokes, 1990)
- Siratus consuela (A. H. Verrill, 1950)
- Siratus cracens Houart, 2014
- Siratus evelynae Houart, 2012
- Siratus formosus (Sowerby, 1841)
- Siratus guionneti (Merle, Garrigues & Pointier, 2001)
- Siratus gundlachi (Dunker, 1883)
- † Siratus harzhauseri Landau & Houart, 2014
- Siratus hennequini (Houart, 2000)
- † Siratus hirmetzli Z. Kovács, 2018
- † Siratus komiticus (Suter, 1917)
- Siratus kugleri (Clench & Perez Farfante, 1945)
- Siratus lamyi Merle & Garrigues, 2008
- Siratus michelae Houart & Colomb, 2012
- Siratus motacilla (Gmelin, 1791)
- Siratus perelegans (Vokes, 1965)
- Siratus pliciferoides (Kuroda, 1942)
- Siratus pointieri Merle & Garrigues, 2011
- Siratus senegalensis (Gmelin, 1791)
- Siratus springeri (Bullis, 1964)
- † Siratus syngenes (Finlay, 1930)
- Siratus tenuivaricosus (Dautzenberg, 1927)
- Siratus thompsoni (Bullis, 1964)
- Siratus vokesorum (Garcia, 1999)

Species brought into synonymy

- Siratus gallinago (G. B. Sowerby III, 1903): synonym of Vokesimurex gallinago (G. B. Sowerby III, 1903)
- Siratus hirasei Shikama, 1973: synonym of Siratus pliciferoides (Kuroda, 1942)
- Siratus vicdani Kosuge, 1980 : synonym of Siratus pliciferoides (Kuroda, 1942)
