= Siratus caudacurtus =

Scientific classification
- Kingdom: Animalia
- Phylum: Mollusca
- Class: Gastropoda
- Subclass: Caenogastropoda
- Order: Neogastropoda
- Family: Muricidae
- Genus: Siratus
- Species: S. caudacurtus

Binomial name
- Siratus caudacurtus (Houart, 1999)

Synonyms
- Chicoreus (Siratus) caudacurta Houart, 1999

Species of gastropod

Siratus caudacurtus is a species of sea snail, a marine gastropod mollusk in the family Muricidae, the murex snails or rock snails.
