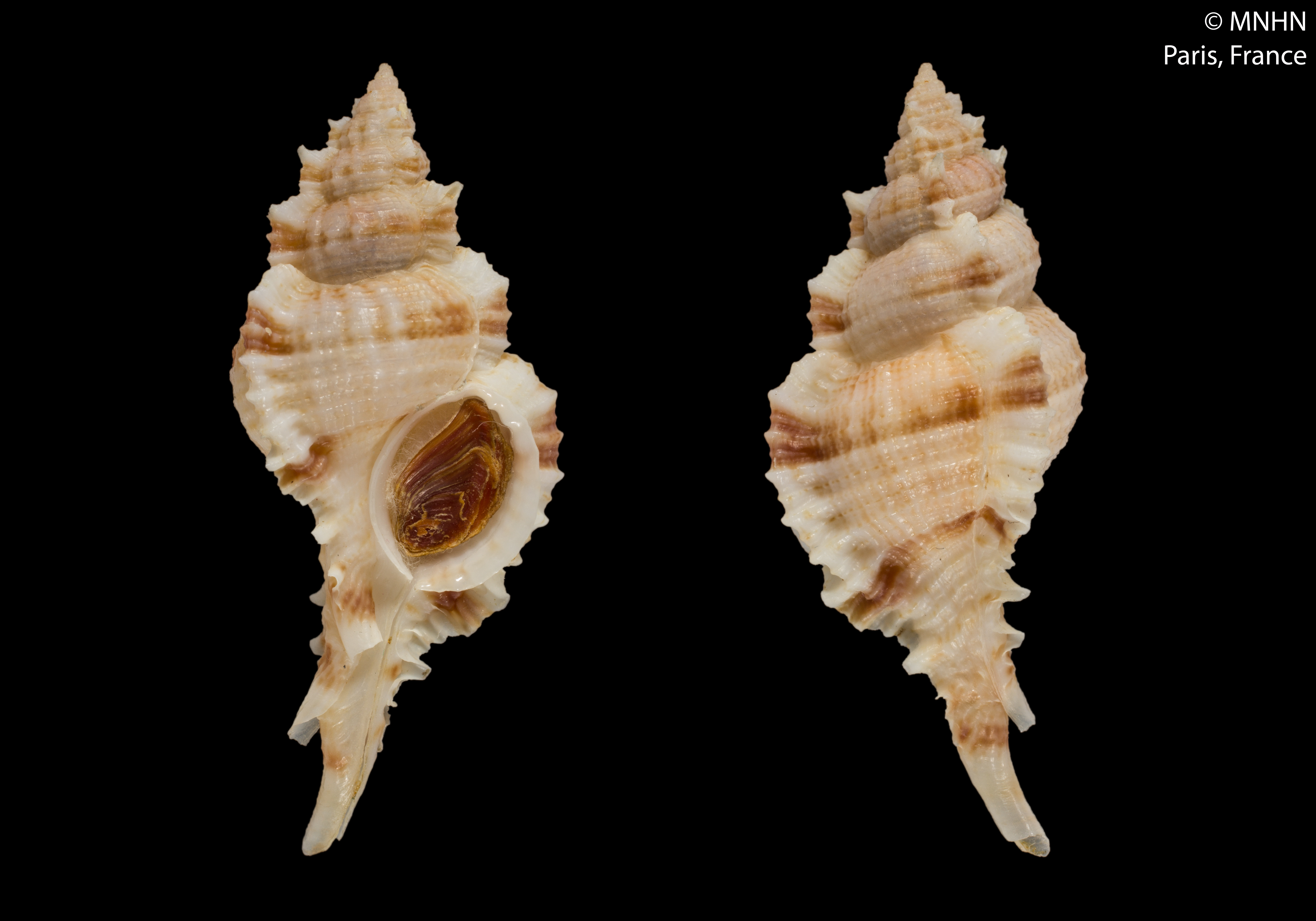
- Shell of Siratus lamyi (holotype at MNHN, Paris)

Scientific classification
- Kingdom: Animalia
- Phylum: Mollusca
- Class: Gastropoda
- Subclass: Caenogastropoda
- Order: Neogastropoda
- Family: Muricidae
- Genus: Siratus
- Species: S. lamyi

Binomial name
- Siratus lamyi Merle & Garrigues, 2008

= Siratus lamyi =

Species of gastropod

Siratus lamyi is a species of sea snail, a marine gastropod mollusk in the family Muricidae, the murex snails or rock snails.

== Description ==
The length of the shell attains 40.2 mm.

== Distribution ==
This marine species occurs off French Guyana.
