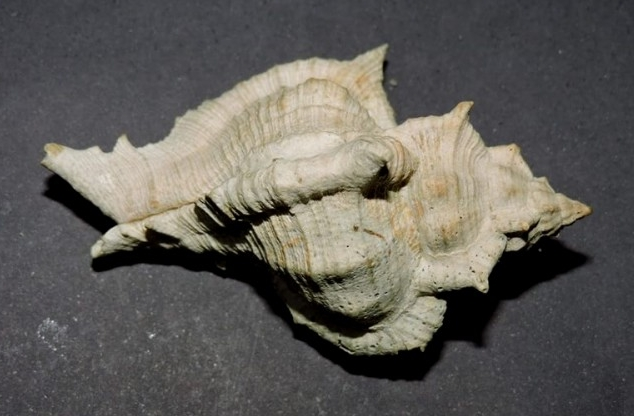
- Shell of Siratus senegalensis

Scientific classification
- Kingdom: Animalia
- Phylum: Mollusca
- Class: Gastropoda
- Subclass: Caenogastropoda
- Order: Neogastropoda
- Family: Muricidae
- Genus: Siratus
- Species: S. senegalensis

Binomial name
- Siratus senegalensis (Gmelin, 1791)

Synonyms
- Chicoreus senegalensis (Gmelin, 1791); Murex brasiliensis Sowerby, 1834; Murex costatus Gmelin, 1791; Murex senegalensis Gmelin, 1791; Murex sirat d'Orbigny, 1841 ·; Purpura sirat Orbigny, 1841

= Siratus senegalensis =

Species of gastropod

Siratus senegalensis is a species of sea snail, a marine gastropod mollusk in the family Muricidae, the murex snails or rock snails.

== Distribution ==
Southern Caribbean to southern Brazil (has been located in Western Africa, originally Senegal, but it is apparently erroneous, according to Radwin & D´Attilio, 1976 and Rios, 2009)
