= Siratus formosus =

- Siratus formosus shell

Scientific classification
- Kingdom: Animalia
- Phylum: Mollusca
- Class: Gastropoda
- Subclass: Caenogastropoda
- Order: Neogastropoda
- Family: Muricidae
- Genus: Siratus
- Species: S. formosus

Binomial name
- Siratus formosus (Sowerby, 1841)

Synonyms
- Murex formosus Sowerby, 1841

Species of gastropod

Siratus formosus is a species of sea snail, a marine gastropod mollusk in the family Muricidae, the murex snails or rock snails.
