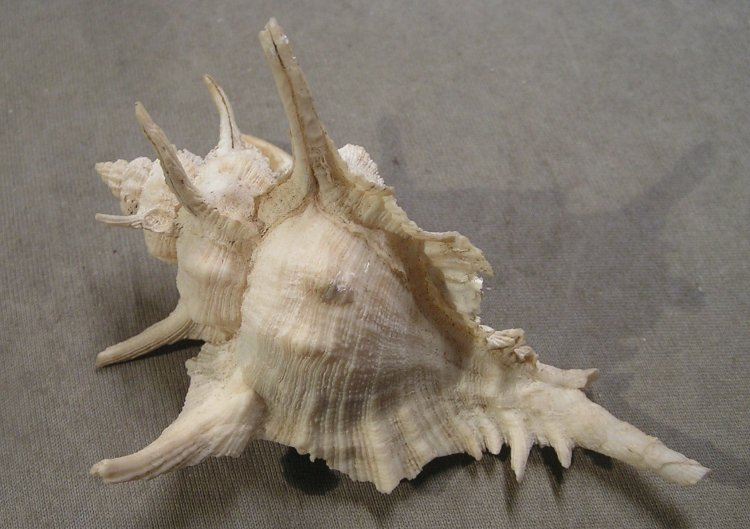
- Shell of Siratus tenuivaricosus

Scientific classification
- Kingdom: Animalia
- Phylum: Mollusca
- Class: Gastropoda
- Subclass: Caenogastropoda
- Order: Neogastropoda
- Family: Muricidae
- Genus: Siratus
- Species: S. tenuivaricosus

Binomial name
- Siratus tenuivaricosus (Dautzenberg, 1927)

Synonyms
- Chicoreus carioca Vokes, 1968; Chicoreus tenuivaricosus (Dautzenberg, 1927); Murex calcar Kiener, 1843; Murex tenuivaricosus Dautzenberg, 1927

= Siratus tenuivaricosus =

Species of gastropod

Siratus tenuivaricosus is a species of sea snail, a marine gastropod mollusk in the family Muricidae, the murex snails or rock snails.

== Description ==
Shell size 80-90 mm.

== Distribution ==
Trawled at 80-100 metres depth, off Rio de Janeiro, Brazil.
