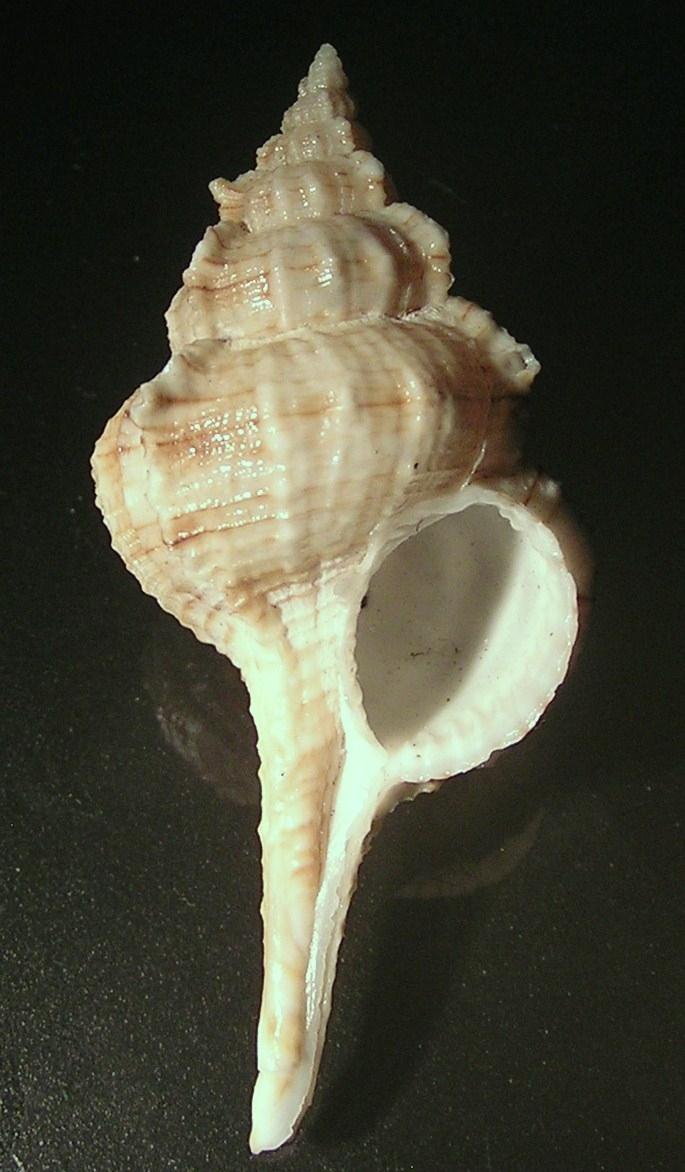
- Siratus ciboney

Scientific classification
- Kingdom: Animalia
- Phylum: Mollusca
- Class: Gastropoda
- Subclass: Caenogastropoda
- Order: Neogastropoda
- Family: Muricidae
- Genus: Siratus
- Species: S. ciboney

Binomial name
- Siratus ciboney (Clench & Perez Farfante, 1945)

Synonyms
- Chicoreus (Siratus) reevei E. H. Vokes, 1965; Chicoreus reevei Vokes, 1965; Murex ciboney Clench & Perez Farfante, 1945; Murex trilineatus Reeve, 1845; Murex yumurinus Sarasua & Espinosa, 1978

= Siratus ciboney =

Species of gastropod

Siratus ciboney is a species of sea snail, a marine gastropod mollusk in the family Muricidae, the murex snails or rock snails.

== Distribution ==
This marine species occurs off Guadeloupe.
