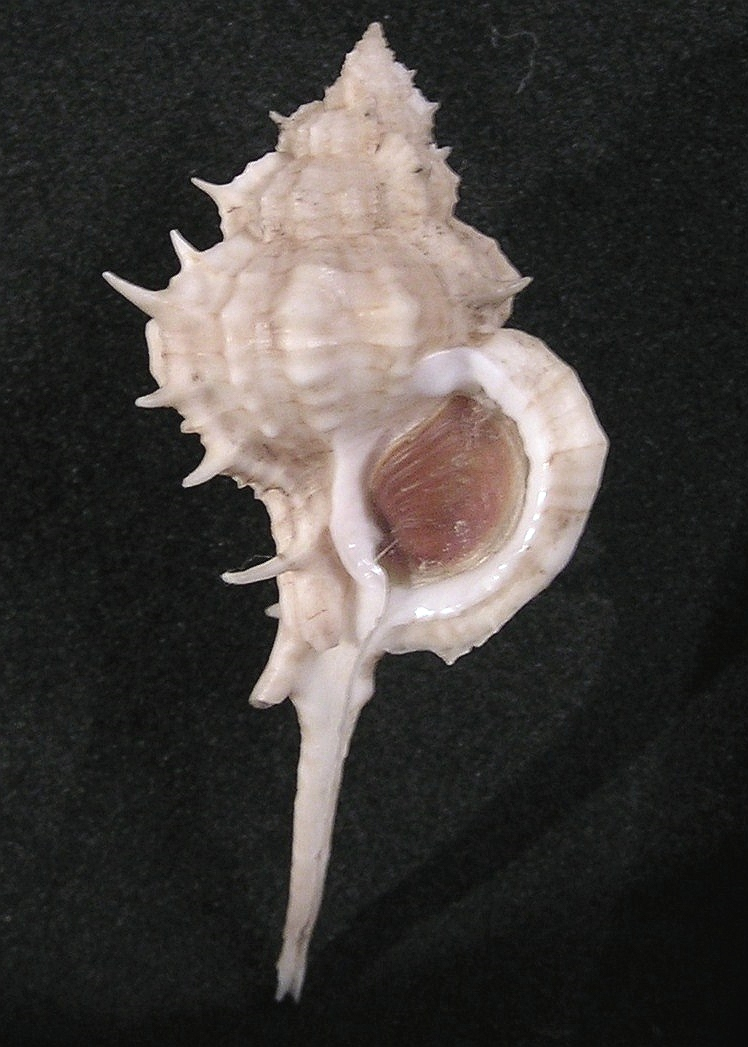
- Apertural view of Siratus cailletti

Scientific classification
- Kingdom: Animalia
- Phylum: Mollusca
- Class: Gastropoda
- Subclass: Caenogastropoda
- Order: Neogastropoda
- Family: Muricidae
- Genus: Siratus
- Species: S. cailletti

Binomial name
- Siratus cailletti (Petit, 1856)

Synonyms
- Murex cailletti Petit, 1856

= Siratus cailletti =

Species of gastropod

Siratus cailletti, common name Caillet's murex, is a species of sea snail, a marine gastropod mollusk in the family Muricidae, the murex snails or rock snails.

Several sources write the name of the species as Siratus cailleti.

== Description ==
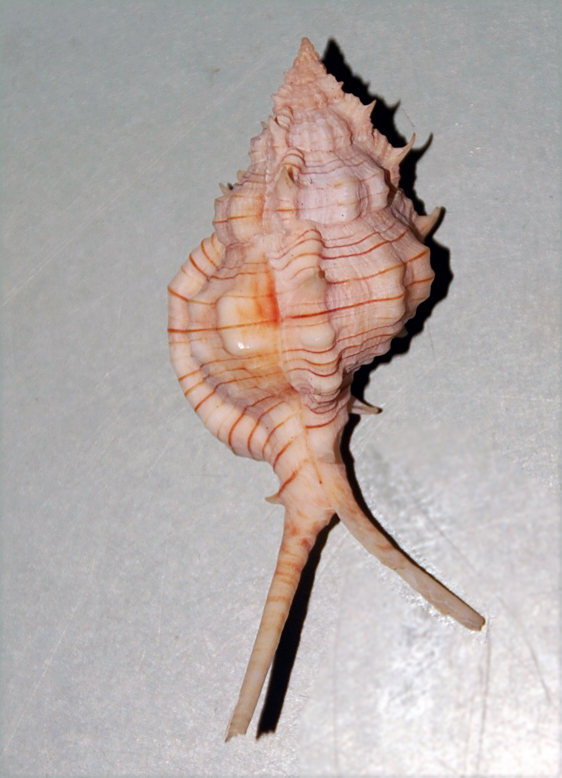
The size of an adult shell varies between 50 mm and 90 mm. with about half that length being the species' rather long siphonal canal. A rare 'two-tailed' specimen of Siratus cailletti This oddity occurs when the siphonal canal associated with the previous varix fails to break away.

== Distribution ==
This species occurs in the Caribbean Sea, the Gulf of Mexico and the Lesser Antilles; along the Bahamas. At Barbados this species has been trapped alive, in abundance, at depths from 450 – 550 ft. offshore the island's West coast. It is also known from similar depths off the island's South coast.
