= Siratus beauii =

Scientific classification
- Kingdom: Animalia
- Phylum: Mollusca
- Class: Gastropoda
- Subclass: Caenogastropoda
- Order: Neogastropoda
- Family: Muricidae
- Genus: Siratus
- Species: S. beauii

Binomial name
- Siratus beauii (Fischer & Bernardi, 1857)

Synonyms
- Murex beauii Fischer & Bernardi, 1857; Murex branchi Clench, 1953; Murex percoides Lobbecke, 1879

Species of gastropod

Siratus beauii is a species of sea snail, a marine gastropod mollusk in the family Muricidae, the murex snails or rock snails.

== Description ==
This species attains a size of 120 mm with a degree of variation in color and sculpture strength, particularly the size of spines and varices.

(Original description in French) This subclaviform shell is solid and features a long siphonal canal. It is yellowish-white or tawny in color. It is ornamented with finely decussate (crisscrossed) transverse ribs and strong tuberculate (knobbed) longitudinal ribs. Three varices are present per whorl in the spire, each surmounted posteriorly by long, straight, channeled spines and elevated, thin, pleated crests. The spire consists of 9 to 10 very convex whorls, which increase gradually in size, separated by a deep suture. The aperture is oval, and the columella is white, reflected, and thick. The peristome is subacute (slightly pointed). The siphonal canal is elongated, narrow, and slender, angulate at its posterior third, and barely raised dorsally.

== Distribution ==
Western Atlantic Ocean: as far north as Cape Hatteras and North Carolina.

This species occurs in the Caribbean Sea, the Gulf of Mexico and the Lesser Antilles.

A deepwater species trapped alive at depths no less than around 180–200 meters, off West coast Barbados.
