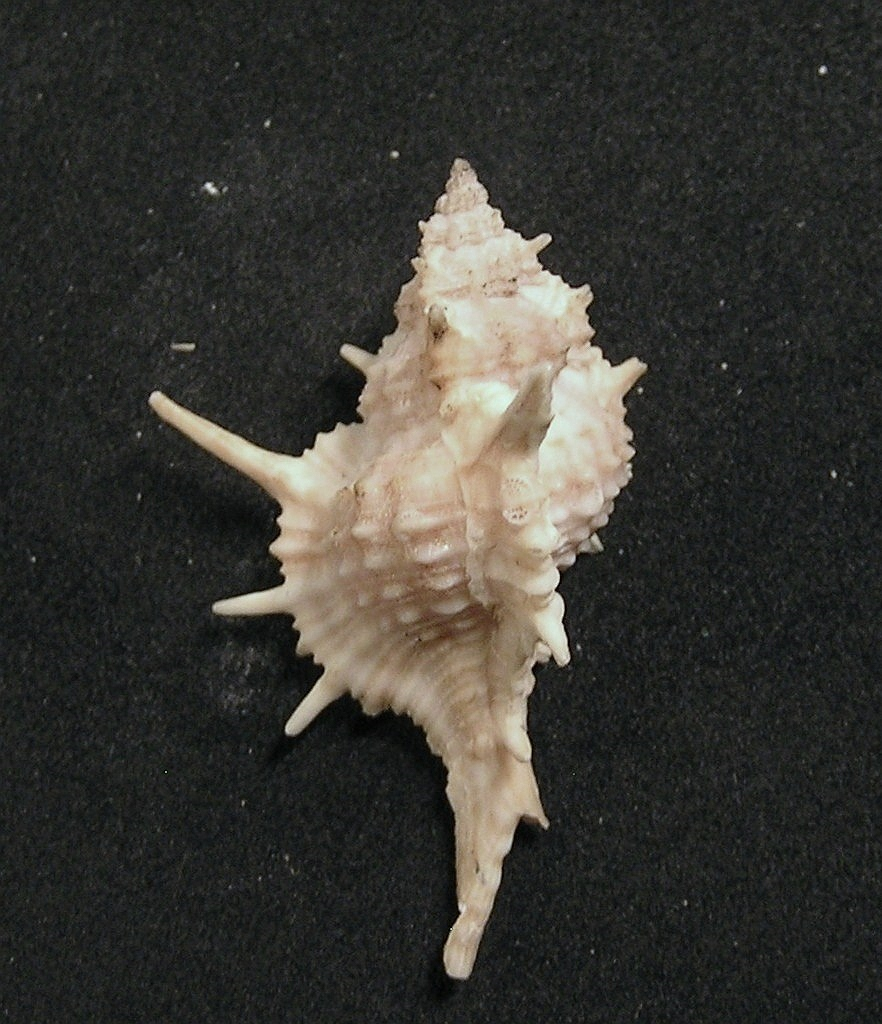
- Siratus articulatus (Reeve, 1845); Puerto Rico

Scientific classification
- Kingdom: Animalia
- Phylum: Mollusca
- Class: Gastropoda
- Subclass: Caenogastropoda
- Order: Neogastropoda
- Family: Muricidae
- Genus: Siratus
- Species: S. articulatus

Binomial name
- Siratus articulatus (Reeve, 1845)

Synonyms
- Murex antillarum Hinds, 1844; Chicoreus articulatus (Reeve, 1845); Murex articulatus Reeve, 1845; Murex finlayi Clench, 1955; Murex gundlachi Dunker, 1883; Murex nodatus Reeve, 1845

= Siratus articulatus =

Species of gastropod

Siratus articulatus is a species of sea snail, a marine gastropod mollusk in the family Muricidae, the murex snails or rock snails.
