= Prototyphis eos paupereques =

Scientific classification
- Kingdom: Animalia
- Phylum: Mollusca
- Class: Gastropoda
- Subclass: Caenogastropoda
- Order: Neogastropoda
- Family: Muricidae
- Genus: Prototyphis
- Species: P. eos
- Subspecies: P. e. paupereques

Trinomial name
- Prototyphis eos paupereques (Powell A. W. B., 1974)

Synonyms
- Pterotyphis zealandicus Powell A. W. B., 1971

Subspecies of mollusc

Prototyphis eos paupereques is a subspecies of small predatory sea snail, a marine gastropod mollusc in the family Muricidae, the murex snails or rock snails.
