= Ponderia canalifera =

Scientific classification
- Kingdom: Animalia
- Phylum: Mollusca
- Class: Gastropoda
- Subclass: Caenogastropoda
- Order: Neogastropoda
- Family: Muricidae
- Genus: Ponderia
- Species: P. canalifera

Binomial name
- Ponderia canalifera (Sowerby, 1841)

Synonyms
- Murex canalifera Sowerby, 1841; Pterynotus (Pterochelus) zealandica iredalei Fleming, 1962

Species of gastropod

Ponderia canalifera is a species of sea snail, a marine gastropod mollusc in the family Muricidae, the murex snails or rock snails.
