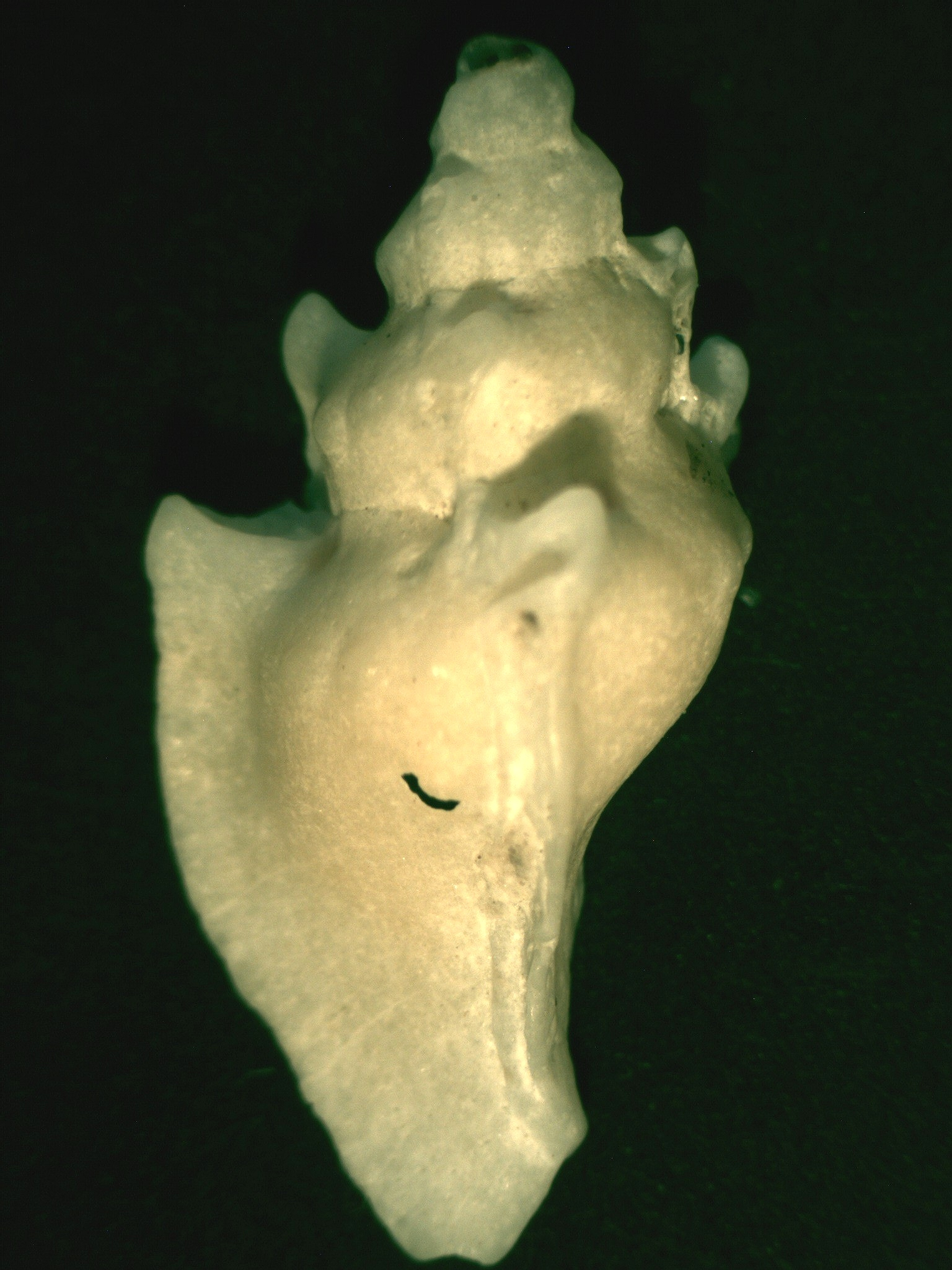
- Prototyphis angasi

Scientific classification
- Kingdom: Animalia
- Phylum: Mollusca
- Class: Gastropoda
- Subclass: Caenogastropoda
- Order: Neogastropoda
- Superfamily: Muricoidea
- Family: Muricidae
- Subfamily: Muricinae
- Genus: Prototyphis; Ponder, 1972

Type species
- Typhis angasi Crosse, 1863

Synonyms
- Pterotyphis (Prototyphis) Ponder, 1972

= Prototyphis =

Genus of gastropods

Prototyphis is a genus of sea snails, marine gastropod mollusks in the subfamily Muricinae of the family Muricidae, the murex snails or rock snails.

== Species ==
Species within the genus Prototyphis include:

- † Prototyphis allani (P. A. Maxwell, 1971)
- Prototyphis angasi (Crosse, 1863)
- † Prototyphis awamoanus (Finlay, 1930)
- Prototyphis eos (Hutton, 1873)
- Prototyphis gracilis Houart & Héros, 2008
- † Prototyphis tahuensis (P. A. Maxwell, 1971)

Species brought into synonymy

- Prototyphis (Ponderia) zealandicus (Hutton, 1873): synonym of Ponderia zealandica (Hutton, 1873)
- Prototyphis paupereques (Powell, 1974): synonym of Prototyphis eos paupereques (Powell, 1974)
- Prototyphis zealandicus (Hutton, 1873): synonym of Ponderia zealandica (Hutton, 1873)
