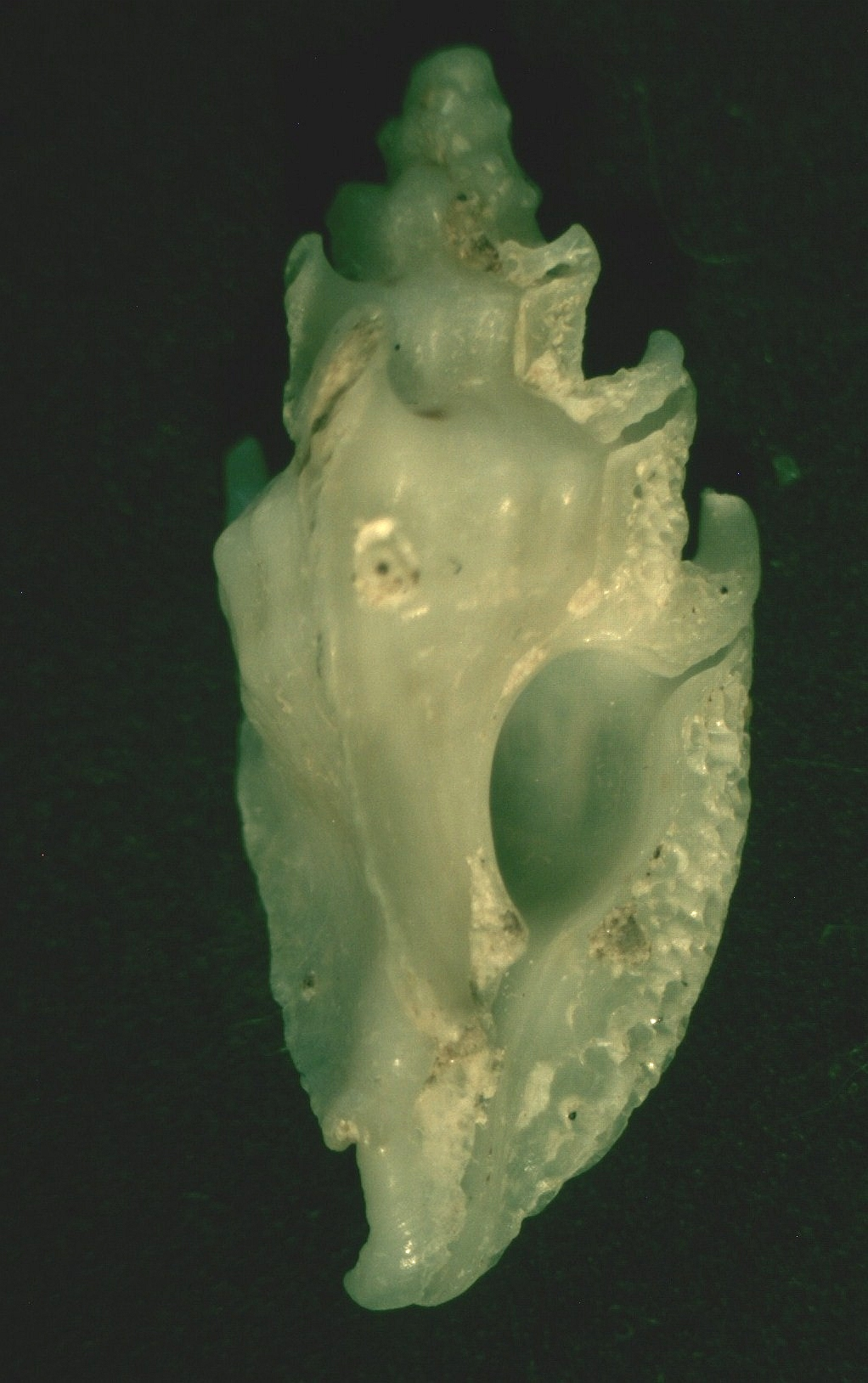

Scientific classification
- Kingdom: Animalia
- Phylum: Mollusca
- Class: Gastropoda
- Subclass: Caenogastropoda
- Order: Neogastropoda
- Family: Muricidae
- Genus: Prototyphis
- Species: P. angasi

Binomial name
- Prototyphis angasi (Crosse, 1863)

Synonyms
- Murex (Pteronotus) cordismei Watson, 1883; Murex zonatus Tenison-Woods, 1877; Typhis angasi Crosse, 1863; Prototyphis eos Hutton, 1873; Prototyphis zonatus Tenison-Woods, 1877

= Prototyphis angasi =

Species of gastropod

Prototyphis angasi is a species of sea snail, a marine gastropod mollusk in the family Muricidae, the murex snails or rock snails.

== Distribution ==
South Australia.

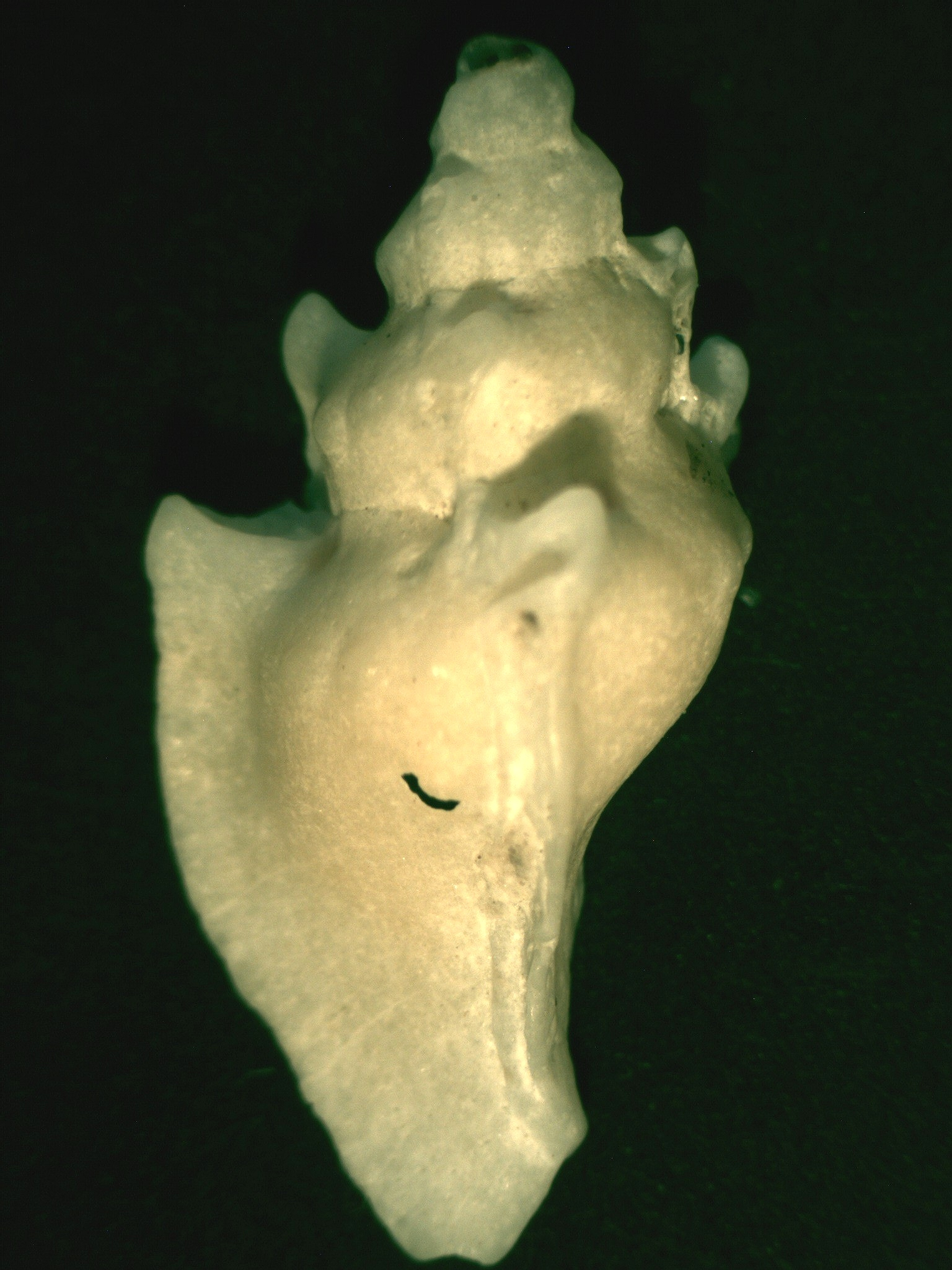
Prototyphis angasi, abapertural view
