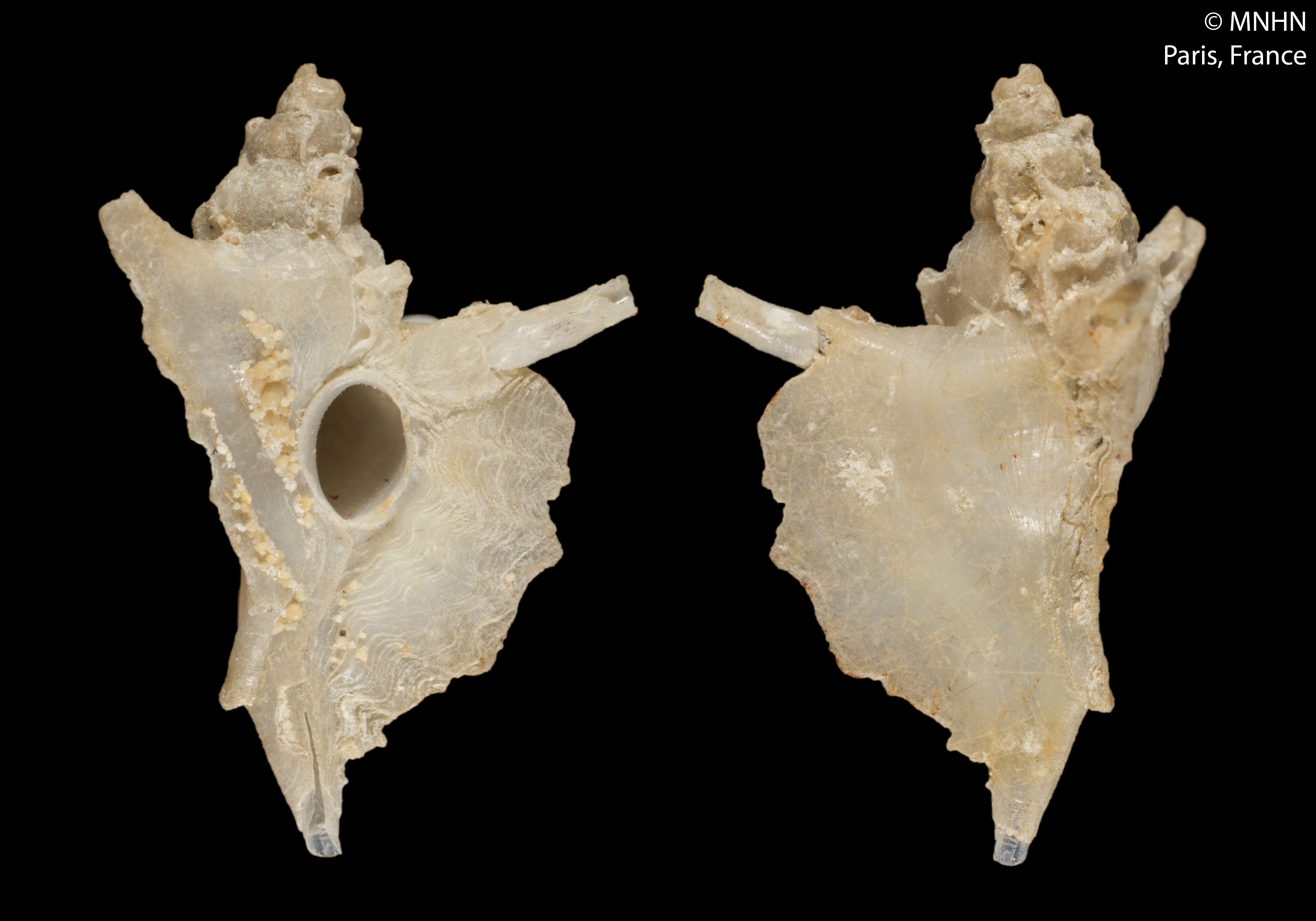
- Shell of Ponderia magna (paratype at MNHN, Paris)

Scientific classification
- Kingdom: Animalia
- Phylum: Mollusca
- Class: Gastropoda
- Subclass: Caenogastropoda
- Order: Neogastropoda
- Family: Muricidae
- Genus: Ponderia
- Species: P. magna

Binomial name
- Ponderia magna Houart, 1988

= Ponderia magna =

Species of gastropod

Ponderia magna is a species of sea snail, a marine gastropod mollusc in the family Muricidae, the murex snails or rock snails.

== Distribution ==
This marine species occurs in the Coral Sea.
