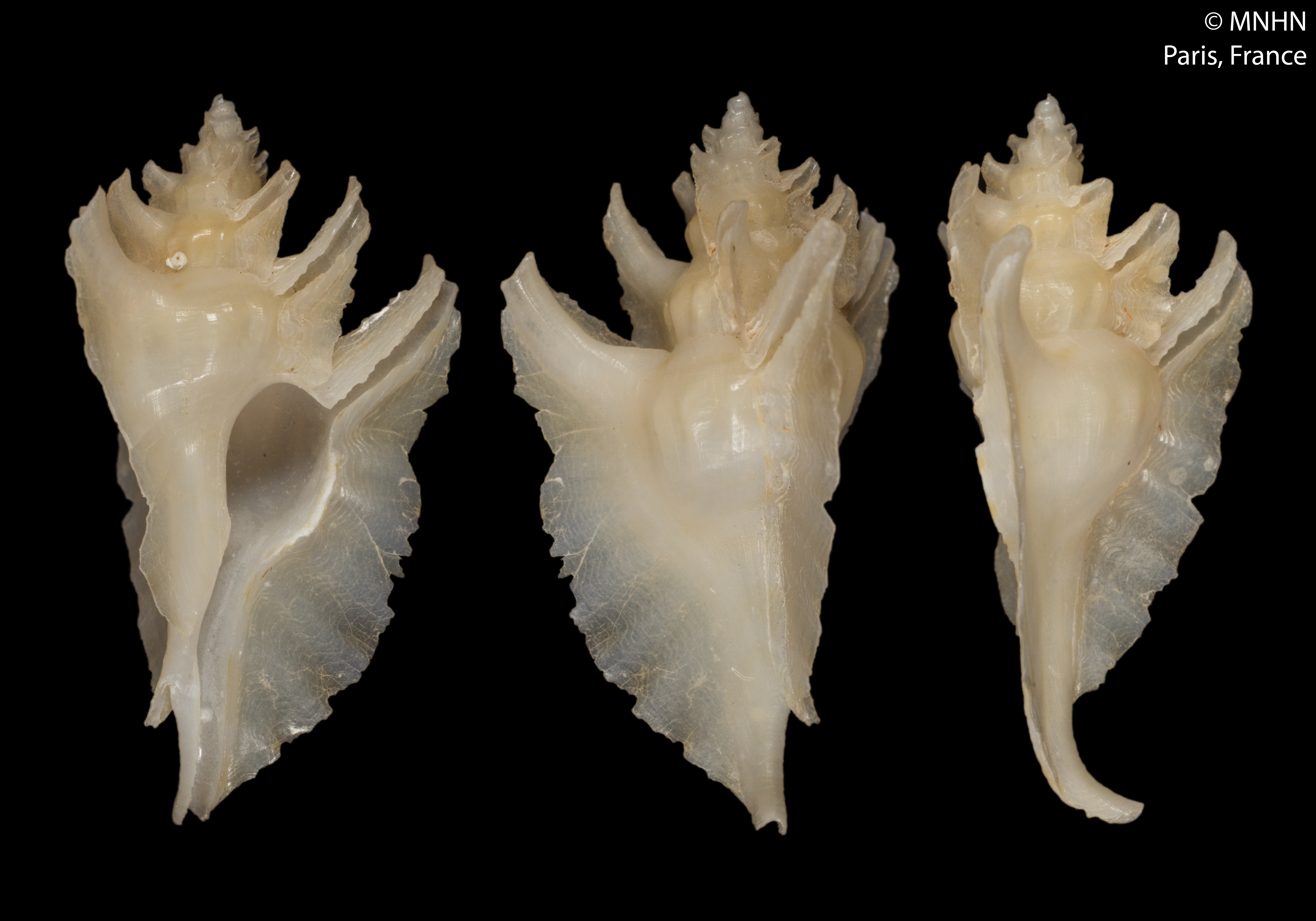
- Shell of Prototyphis gracilis (holotype at MNHN, Paris)

Scientific classification
- Kingdom: Animalia
- Phylum: Mollusca
- Class: Gastropoda
- Subclass: Caenogastropoda
- Order: Neogastropoda
- Family: Muricidae
- Genus: Prototyphis
- Species: P. gracilis

Binomial name
- Prototyphis gracilis Houart & Héros, 2008

= Prototyphis gracilis =

Species of gastropod

Prototyphis gracilis is a species of sea snail, a marine gastropod mollusk in the family Muricidae, the murex snails or rock snails.

== Description ==
Houart, R. & Héros, V. (2008). Muricidae (Mollusca: Gastropoda) from Fiji and Tonga. In: Héros, V. et al. (eds), Tropical Deep-Sea Benthos 25. Mémoires du Muséum national d'Histoire naturelle. 196: 437-480.

The length of the shell attains 23.5 mm.

== Distribution ==
This marine species occurs off the Fiji Islands.
