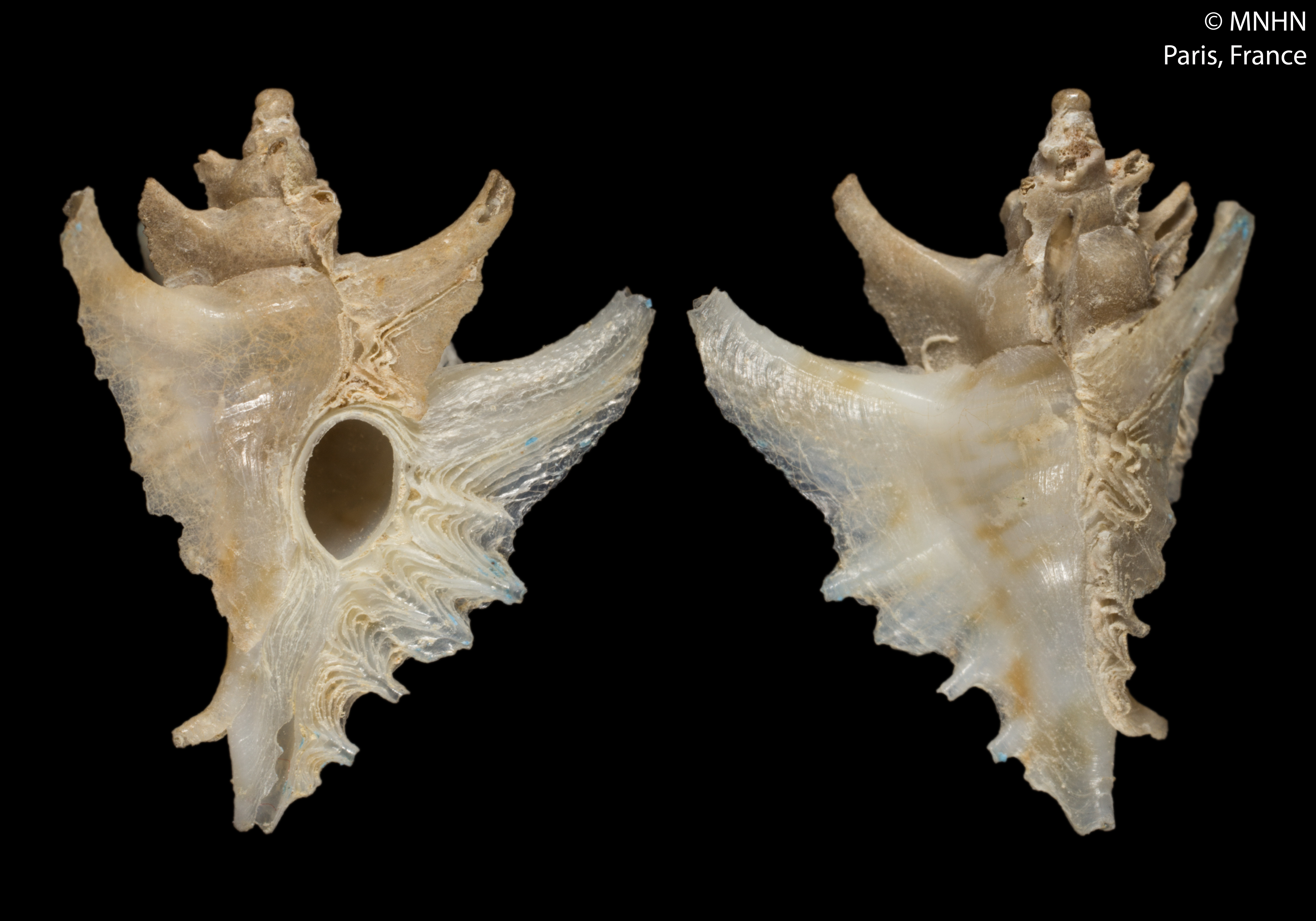
- Ponderia caledonica

Scientific classification
- Kingdom: Animalia
- Phylum: Mollusca
- Class: Gastropoda
- Subclass: Caenogastropoda
- Order: Neogastropoda
- Superfamily: Muricoidea
- Family: Muricidae
- Subfamily: Muricinae
- Genus: Ponderia; Houart, 1986

Type species
- † Typhis zealandica Hutton, 1873

Synonyms
- Prototyphis (Ponderia) Houart, 1986

= Ponderia =

Genus of gastropods

Ponderia is a genus of sea snails, marine gastropod molluscs in the family Muricidae, the murex snails or rock snails.

== Species ==
Species within the genus Ponderia include:

- † Ponderia abessensis Lozouet, 1998
- Ponderia abies Houart, 1986
- † Ponderia bispinosa (J. de C. Sowerby, 1823)
- Ponderia caledonica Houart, 1988
- Ponderia canalifera (Sowerby, 1841)
- Ponderia elephantina Houart, 1990
- Ponderia magna Houart, 1988
- † Ponderia magnei (Vergneau-Saubade, 1968)
- Ponderia zealandica (Hutton, 1873)
