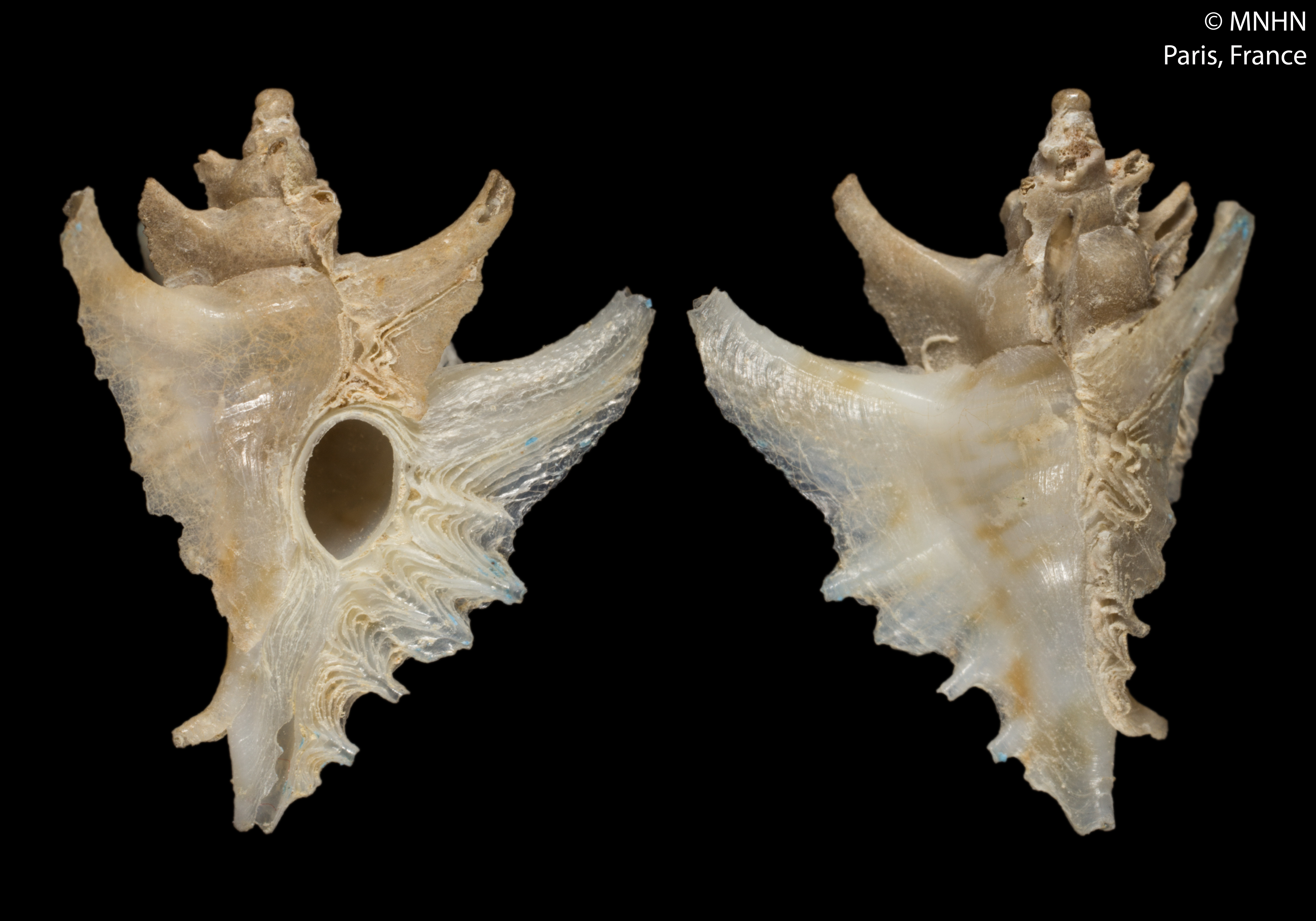
- Shell of Ponderia caledonica (holotype at MNHN, Paris)

Scientific classification
- Kingdom: Animalia
- Phylum: Mollusca
- Class: Gastropoda
- Subclass: Caenogastropoda
- Order: Neogastropoda
- Family: Muricidae
- Genus: Ponderia
- Species: P. caledonica

Binomial name
- Ponderia caledonica Houart, 1988

= Ponderia caledonica =

Species of gastropod

Ponderia caledonica is a species of sea snail, a marine gastropod mollusc in the family Muricidae, the murex snails or rock snails.

== Description ==
The length of the shell attains 15.1 mm.

== Distribution ==
This marine species occurs off New Caledonia.
