= Prototyphis eos =

Scientific classification
- Kingdom: Animalia
- Phylum: Mollusca
- Class: Gastropoda
- Subclass: Caenogastropoda
- Order: Neogastropoda
- Family: Muricidae
- Genus: Prototyphis
- Species: P. eos

Binomial name
- Prototyphis eos (Hutton, 1873)

Synonyms
- Murex bipunctatus Sowerby, 1879; Murex eos Hutton, 1873 (basionym)

Species of gastropod

Prototyphis eos is a species of sea snail, a marine gastropod mollusk in the family Muricidae, the murex snails or rock snails.

There are two subspecies :

- Prototyphis eos eos (Hutton, 1873)
- Prototyphis eos paupereques (Powell, 1974) (synonym : Prototyphis paupereques (Powell, 1974))

== Description ==
The size of an adult shell varies between 15 mm and 30 mm.

== Distribution ==
This marine species is found in Australia and Northern New Zealand.
