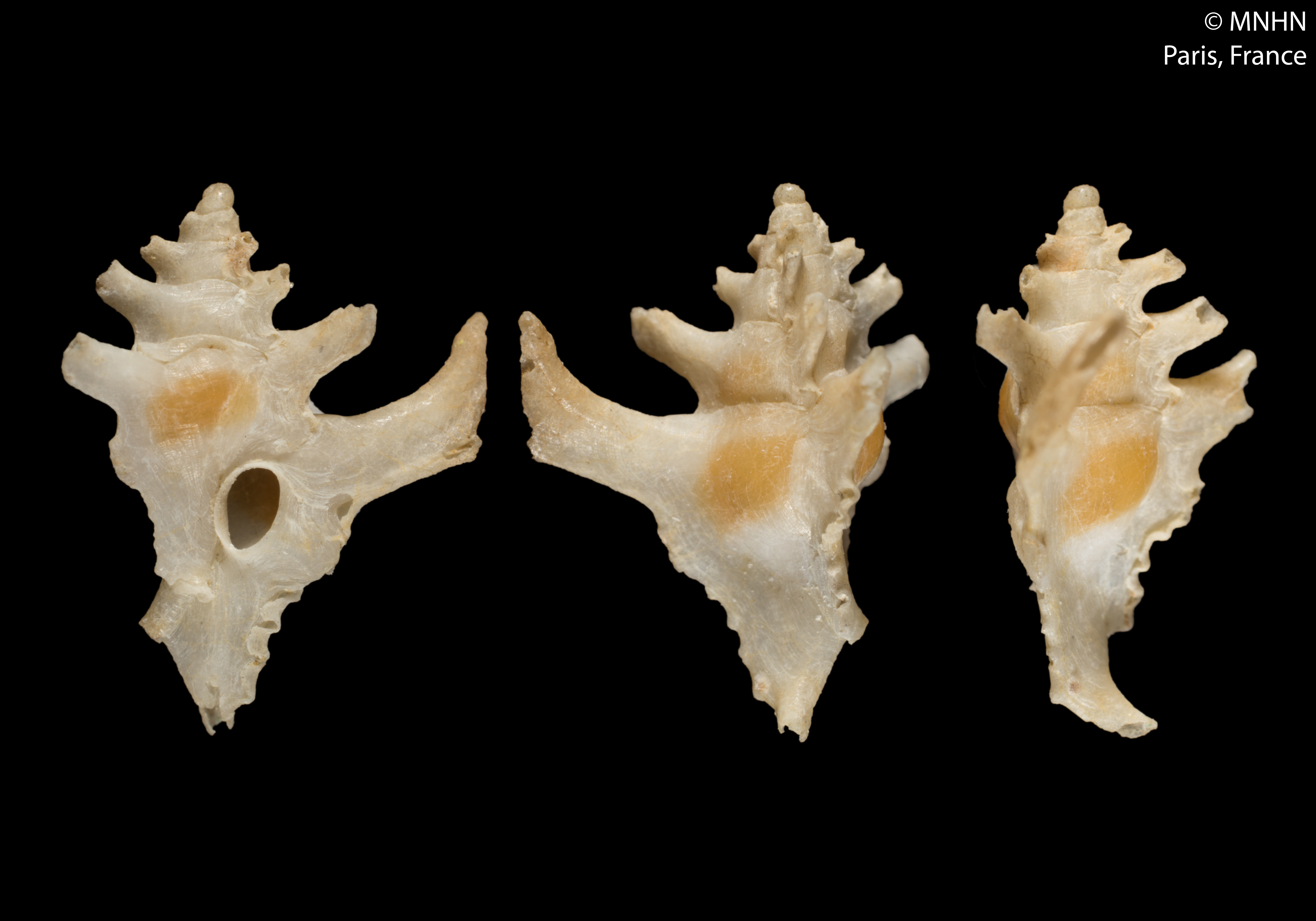
- Shell of Ponderia elephantina (paratype at MNHN, Paris)

Scientific classification
- Kingdom: Animalia
- Phylum: Mollusca
- Class: Gastropoda
- Subclass: Caenogastropoda
- Order: Neogastropoda
- Family: Muricidae
- Genus: Ponderia
- Species: P. elephantina

Binomial name
- Ponderia elephantina Houart, 1990

= Ponderia elephantina =

Species of gastropod

Ponderia elephantina is a species of sea snail, a marine gastropod mollusc in the family Muricidae, the murex snails or rock snails.

== Distribution ==
This marine species occurs off New Caledonia.
