= Ponderia abies =

Scientific classification
- Kingdom: Animalia
- Phylum: Mollusca
- Class: Gastropoda
- Subclass: Caenogastropoda
- Order: Neogastropoda
- Family: Muricidae
- Genus: Ponderia
- Species: P. abies

Binomial name
- Ponderia abies Houart, 1986

Species of gastropod

Ponderia abies is a species of sea snail, a marine gastropod mollusc in the family Muricidae, the murex snails or rock snails.
