= Ponderia zealandica =

Scientific classification
- Kingdom: Animalia
- Phylum: Mollusca
- Class: Gastropoda
- Subclass: Caenogastropoda
- Order: Neogastropoda
- Family: Muricidae
- Genus: Ponderia
- Species: P. zealandica

Binomial name
- Ponderia zealandica (Hutton, 1873)

Synonyms
- Prototyphis zealandicus (Hutton, 1873); Pterynotus (Pterochelus) zealandica (Hutton, 1873); Typhis zealandica Hutton, 1873

Species of gastropod

Ponderia zealandica is a species of sea snail, a marine gastropod mollusc in the family Muricidae, the murex snails or rock snails.
